= Caferağa, Kadıköy =

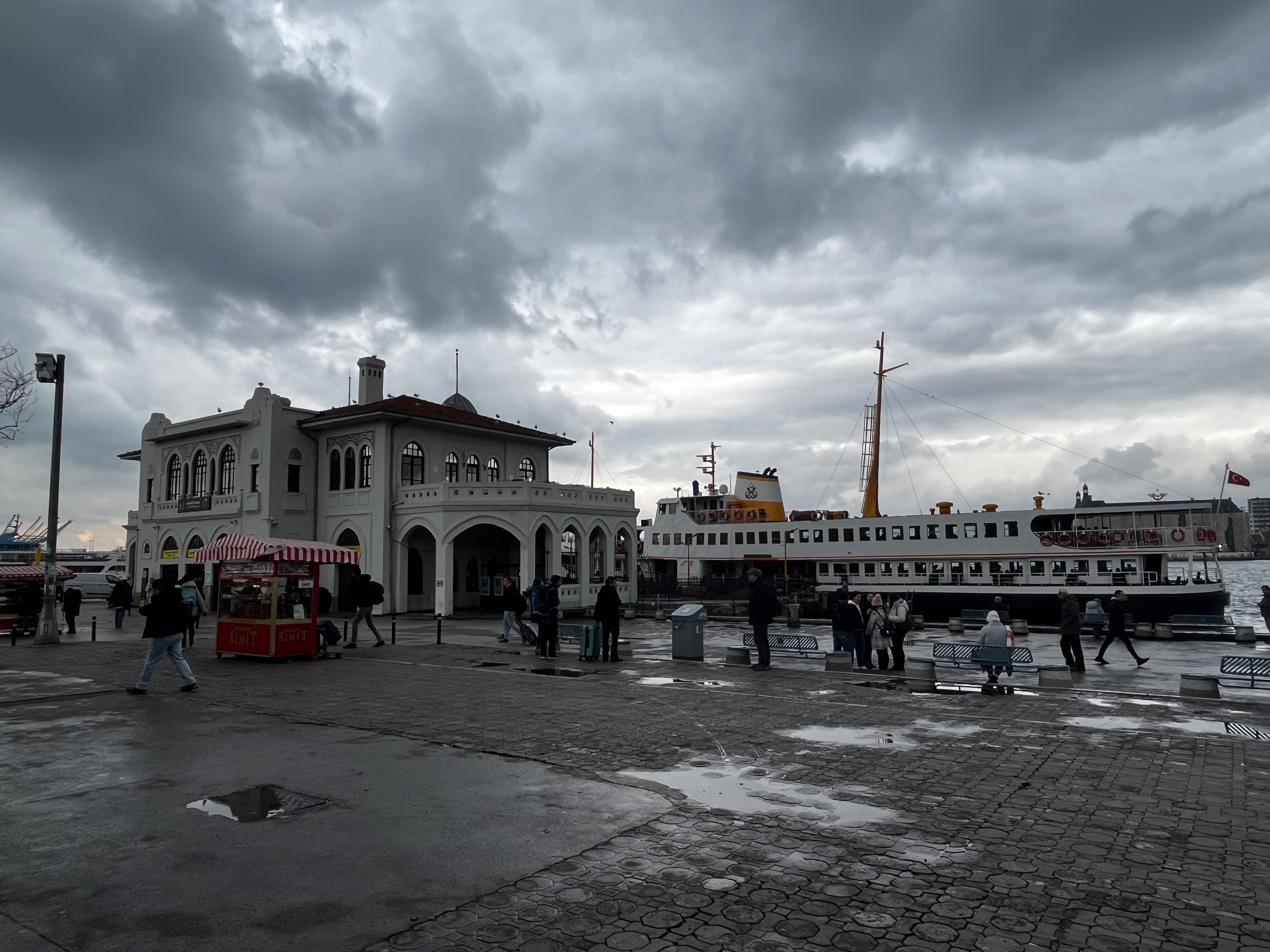
Ferry pier, Caferağa, Kadıköy, Istanbul

Caferağa is a neighborhood (mahalle) in the district of Kadıköy, Istanbul, Turkey. It is one of the oldest neighborhoods of Kadıköy. It includes the Moda neighborhood (semt). Caferağa is bordered on the north by Kadıköy Bay of the Bosporus, on the west by the Kadıköy neighborhoods of Osmanağa and Zühtüpaşa, on the south by Kalamış Bay of the Sea of Marmara, and on the west by the Sea of Marmara. Caferağa's population is 21,421 (2020).

== Notable features ==
- the Eminönü - Karaköy Pier, Adalar - Beşiktaş Pier, and İDO Kadıköy Pier
- the History, Literature, and Art Library, built 1912-1914 as local administration building (şehremaneti), converted to a library in 2014
- the Kadıköy Haldun Taner Stage, built as a market hall in the 1920s, converted to a theater in 1989
- the Barış Manço Culture Center, opened in 1998

== Historic sites ==
- the Kethüda Mosque, possibly built in 1550 by Kethüda Mustafa Ağa, repaired in 1952, restored in 1983
- the Cafer Ağa Mosque, built 1554-1557 by Darüssaade Ağası Cafer Ağa, restored in 1900
- the Sürmeli Ali Paşa Fountain (çeşme), built in 1693-94 by Sürmeli Ali Paşa, restored in 2007
- the Holy King Armenian Church, built before 1722 as the Holy Mother of God Church, rebuilt in 1814, repaired after an 1840 earthquake, burnt in 1855, rebuilt in 1858 as the Holy King Church, restored in 2006 and 2011
- the Mustafa III Mosque, built in 1750 by Mustafa III, rebuilt in 1858 by Abdülmecid I
- the Barış Manço House, built 1895-1900 for a Mr. Dawson; after changing hands several times, bought by Manço in 1984; converted into a museum house in 2010
- the Moda Pier, built in the 1910s, restored in 2022
