= List of active Armenian churches in Turkey =

There are hundreds of Armenian churches in Turkey, the majority of which are either in ruins or are being used for other purposes. Armenian churches still in active use belonging to various denominations, mainly Armenian Apostolic, but also Armenian Catholic and Armenian Evangelical Protestant.

== Armenian Apostolic Churches ==
=== Old İstanbul ===
Name	Armenian name	Location	Year	Status
Armenian Patriarchate of Constantinople	Պատրիարքութիւն Հայոց Կոստանդնուպոլսոյ			Active
Surp Asdvadzadzin Patriarchate Church	Սուրբ Աստուածածին Աթոռանիստ Մայր Տաճար	Kumkapı		Active
Surp Kevork Church	Սուրբ Գէորգ Եկեղեցի	Samatya	1887	Active
Surp Hagop Church	Սուրբ Յակոբ Գլխադիր Եկեղեցի	Altımermer	1892	Active
Surp Sarkis Cenotaph Chapel	Սուրբ Սարգիս Մատուռ	Balıklı	1895	Active
Kumkapı Surp Harutyun Church	Սուրբ Յարութիւն Եկեղեցի	Kumkapı	1855	Active
Gedikpaşa Surp Hovhannes Church	Սուրբ Յովհաննէս Եկեղեցի	Gedikpaşa	1876	Active
Surp Tateos – Surp Partoğomeos Church	Սուրբ Թադէոս – Սուրբ Բարթողոմէոս Եկեղեցի	Yenikapı		Active
Narlıkapı Surp Hovhannes Church	Սուրբ Յովհաննէս Եկեղեցի	Narlıkapı	1807	Active
Topkapı Surp Nigoğayos Church	Սուրբ Նիկողայոս Եկեղեցի	Topkapı		Active
Surp Pırgiç Armenian Hospital Chapel	Սուրբ Փրկիչ Մատուռ	Yedikule	1834	Active
Dzınunt Surp Asdvadzadzni Church	Ծնունդ Սուրբ Աստուածածնի Եկեղեցի	Sakızağacı	1844	Active
Yeşilköy Surp Stepanos Church	Սուրբ Ստեփանոս Եկեղեցի	Yeşilköy	1844	Active
Surp Hıreşdagabed Church	Սուրբ Հրեշտակապետաց Եկեղեցի	Balat	1835	Active
Surp Yeyğa Church	Սուրբ Եղիա Եկեղեցի	Eyüp	1832	Active
Eyüp Surp Asdvadzadzin Church	Սուրբ Աստուածածին Եկեղեցի	Eyüp	1855	Active

=== European side of İstanbul ===
Name	Armenian name	Location	Year	Status
Halıcıoğlu Surp Stepanos Church	Սուրբ Ստեփանոս Եկեղեցի	Halıcıoğlu	1831	Active
Galata Surp Krikor Lusavoriç Church	Սուրբ Գրիգոր Լուսավորիչ եկեղեցի	Karaköy	1962	Active
Surp Yerrortutyun Church	Սուրբ Երրորդութիւն Եկեղեցի	Beyoğlu	1838	Active
Taksim Surp Harutyun Church	Սուրբ Յարութիւն Եկեղեցի	Taksim	1895	Active
Surp Vartanants Church	Սուրբ Վարդանանց Եկեղեցի	Feriköy	1861	Active
Beşiktaş Surp Asdvadzadzin Church	Սուրբ Աստուածածին Եկեղեցի	Beşiktaş	1838	Active
Ortaköy Surp Asdvadzadzin Church	Սուրբ Աստուածածին Եկեղեցի	Ortaköy	1825	Active
Yerevman Surp Haç Church	Երեւման Սուրբ Խաչ Եկեղեցի	Kuruçeşme		Active
Surp Santuht Church	Սուրբ Սանդուխտ Եկեղեցի	Rumelihisarı	1978	Active
Surp Yerits Mangants Church	Սուրբ Երից Մանկանց Եկեղեցի	Boyacıköy	1885	Active
Yeniköy Surp Asdvadzadzin Church	Սուրբ Աստուածածին Եկեղեցի	Yeniköy		Active
Surp Hripsimyants Church	Սուրբ Հռիփսիմեանց Եկեղեցի	Büyükdere	1848	Active

=== Anatolian side of İstanbul ===
Name	Armenian name	Location	Year	Status
Surp Takavor Church	Սուրբ Թագաւոր Եկեղեցի	Kadıköy	1858	Active
Surp Haç Church	Սուրբ Խաչ Եկեղեցի	Üsküdar	19th century	Active
Surp Garabet Church	Սուրբ Կարապետ Եկեղեցի	Üsküdar	1888	Active
Üsküdar Surp Krikor Lusavoriç Church	Սուրբ Գրիգոր Լուսավորիչ եկեղեցի	Kuzguncuk	1861	Active
Surp Yergodasan Arakelots Church	Սուրբ Երկոտասան Առաքելոց Եկեղեցի	Kandilli	1846	Active
Beykoz Surp Nigoğayos Church	Սուրբ Նիկողայոս Եկեղեցի	Beykoz	1834	Active
Surp Nışan Church	Սուրբ Նշան Եկեղեցի	Kartal	1857	Active

=== Prince Islands ===
Name	Armenian name	Location	Year	Status
Kınalıada Surp Krikor Lusavoriç Church	Սուրբ Գրիգոր Լուսավորիչ եկեղեցի	Kınalıada	1857	Active

=== Anatolia ===
Name	Armenian name	Location	Year	Status
Sivrihisar Surp Yerrortutyun Church	Սուրբ Երրորդութիւն Եկեղեցի	Eskişehir	1650	Active
Kayseri Surp Krikor Lusavoriç Church	Սուրբ Գրիգոր Լուսավորիչ եկեղեցի	Kayseri	1856	Active
Surp Giragos Church	Սուրբ Կիրակոս եկեղեցի	Diyarbakır	1371	Active
Mardin Surp Kevork Church	Սուրբ Գէորգ Եկեղեցի	Derik, Mardin		Active
Surp Karasun Manuk Church	Սրբոց Քառասուն Մանուկ եկեղեցի	İskenderun		Active
Hatay Surp Krikor Lusavoriç Church	Սուրբ Գրիգոր Լուսավորիչ եկեղեցի	Kırıkhan	1830	Active
Hatay Surp Asdvadzadzin Church	Սուրբ Աստուածածին Եկեղեցի	Vakıflı, Samandağ	1895	Active

== Armenian Catholic Churches ==
Name	Armenian name	Location	Year	Status
Surp Asdvadzadzin Armenian Catholic Church	Սուրբ Աստուածածին Եկեղեցի	Beşiktaş		Active
Surp Ohan Voskiperan Church		Taksim		Active
Kocamustafapaşa Anarad Hığutyun Church		Kocamustafapaşa, Fatih		Active
Surp Levon Church	Սուրբ Լեւոն եկեղեցի	Kadıköy	1911	Active
Pangaltı Anarad Hığutyun Church		Pangaltı		Active
Surp Pırgiç Church	Սուրբ Փրկիչ Եկեղեցի	Galata	1834	Active
Ortaköy Surp Krikor Lusavoriç Church	Սուրբ Գրիգոր Լուսավորիչ եկեղեցի	Ortaköy		Active
Surp Yerrortutyun Katolik Church	Սուրբ Երրորդութիւն Եկեղեցի	Beyoğlu		Active
Surp Boğos Church	Սուրբ Պօղոս Եկեղեցի	Büyükdere	1885	Active
Surp Asdvadzadzin Verapokhum Church	Սուրբ Աստուածածին վէրապոկհըմ Եկեղեցի	Büyükada	1858	Active
Surp Hovhannes Mıgırdiç Church	Սուրբ Հովհաննես Մկրտիչ եկեղեցի	Yeniköy	1866	Active
Surp Andon Church	Սուրբ Անտոն եկեղեցի	Tarabya	1871	Active

== Armenian Evangelical Churches ==
Name	Armenian name	Location	Year	Status
Armenian Evangelical Church	Armenian Evangelical Church	Fatih	1846	Active
Armenian Evangelical Church	Հայ Աւետարանական Եկեղեցի	Beyoğlu		Active

== See also ==
- Destroyed Armenian churches in Turkey
- Christianity in Turkey
