= Suadiye =

Suadiye may refer to:

- Suadiye neighborhood of Kadıköy district, Istanbul, Turkey, an important shopping district
  - Suadiye railway station in that neighborhood
- Suadiye neighborhood of Kartepe district, Kocaeli, Turkey
