= Söğütlüçeşme railway station =

Railway station in Istanbul, Turkey

Söğütlüçeşme
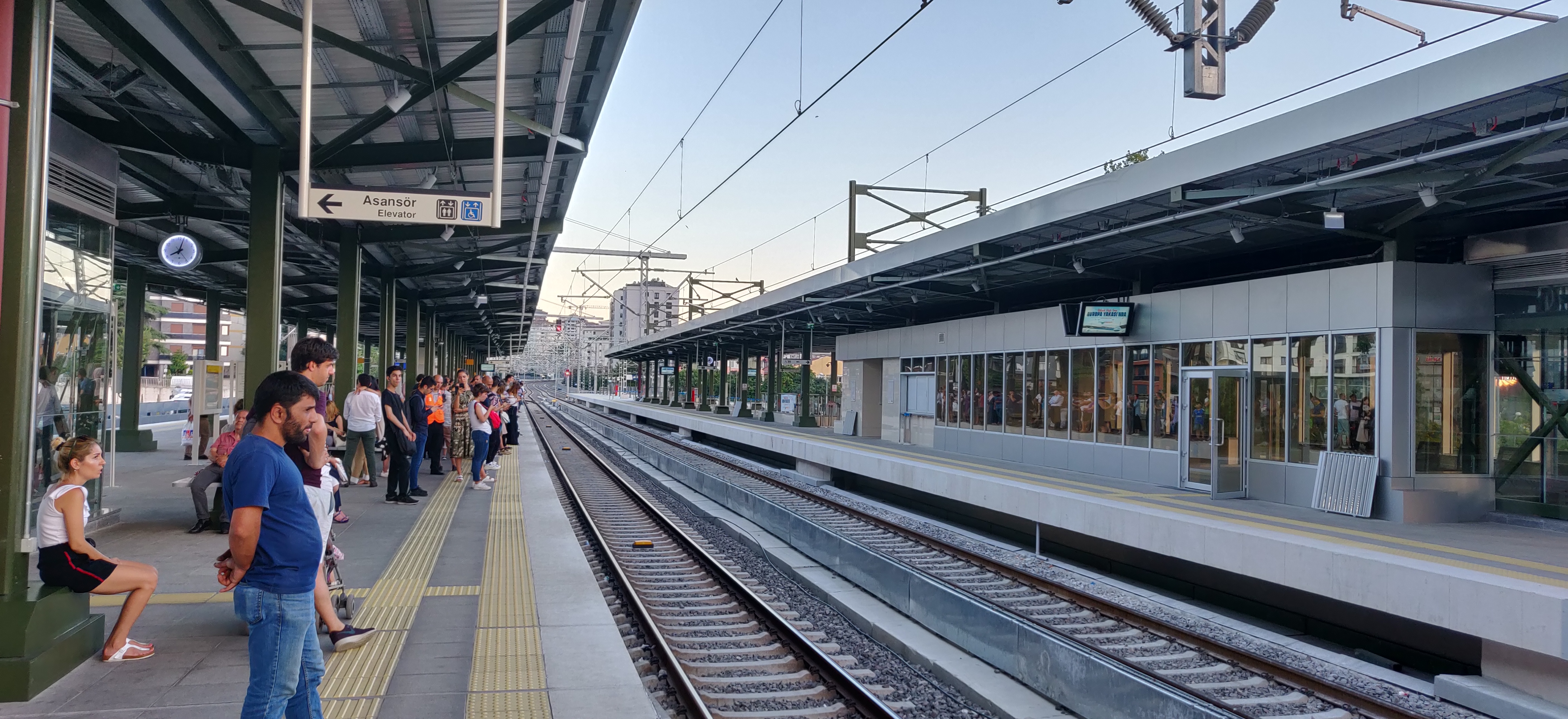
- Söğütlüçeşme station after reconstruction.

General information
- Location: Ziverbey Yolu, Zühütpaşa Mah., 34724; Kadıköy/Istanbul; Turkey
- Coordinates: 40.9906°N 29.0377°E
- Owner: Turkish State Railways
- Operator: TCDD Taşımacılık
- Line: Istanbul-Ankara railway
- Platforms: 2 island platform
- Tracks: 4
- Connections: Metrobus at Söğütlüçeşme; İETT Bus: 2, 8E, 9K, 10B, 10E, 10G, 14AK, 14B, 14CE, 14ES, 14Y, 14ÇK, 14ŞB, 15SK, 15YK, 15ÇK, 17, 17L, 19ES, 19F, 19K, 19M, 19S, 19Y, 20D, 20K, ER1, ER2, FB1, FB2, GZ1, GZ2

Construction
- Structure type: Elevated
- Parking: Parking lots on north and west sides
- Accessible: Yes

Other information
- Station code: 1624

History
- Opened: 22 September 1872
- Closed: 2013-19
- Rebuilt: 1975-79, 2013-2018
- Electrified: 29 May 1969; 25 kV, 50 Hz AC Overhead wire

Services
Preceding station	TCDD Taşımacılık	Following station
Bakırköy towards Istanbul Halkalı	Yüksek Hızlı Tren	Bostancı towards Ankara
Bakırköy towards Istanbul Halkalı	Yüksek Hızlı Tren	Bostancı towards Karaman
Bakırköy towards Istanbul Halkalı	Ankara Express	Bostancı towards Ankara
Ayrılık Çeşmesi towards Halkalı	Marmaray	Feneryolu towards Gebze
Former services
Preceding station	Turkish State Railways	Following station
Istanbul Terminus	Capital Express	Bostancı towards Ankara
Istanbul Terminus	Republic Express	Bostancı towards Ankara
Istanbul Terminus	Fatih Express	Bostancı towards Ankara
Istanbul Terminus	Boğaziçi Express	Bostancı towards Ankara
Istanbul Terminus	Anatolian Express	Bostancı towards Ankara
Istanbul Terminus	Ankara Express	Bostancı towards Ankara
Istanbul Terminus	Eskişehir Express	Bostancı towards Eskişehir
Istanbul Terminus	Sakarya Express	Bostancı towards Eskişehir
Istanbul Terminus	Adapazarı Express	Erenköy towards Adapazarı
Haydarpaşa Terminus	Haydarpaşa suburban	Kızıltoprak towards Gebze
Location

Söğütlüçeşme railway station (Turkish: Söğütlüçeşme İstasyonu) is a railway station in the Kadıköy district of Istanbul, Turkey. Up until 2013, the station was serviced by commuter trains as well as regional and intercity trains. Söğütlüçeşme was closed down on 19 June 2013 for the rehabilitation and expansion of the railway for the new Marmaray commuter rail system. Located 1.46 km (0.91 mi) east from Haydarpaşa station, it is situated upon a viaduct with two island platforms with four tracks.

Söğütlüçeşme station reopened on March 12, 2019 along with the rest of the Marmaray project until Gebze.

== History ==
The original station was opened in 1872 by the Ottoman government, as part of a railway from Kadıköy to İzmit. This station was located just north of the actual one at ground level. The station, along with the railway, was sold to the Ottoman Anatolian Railway (CFOA) in 1880. The CFOA operated the railway until 1924, when it was bought by the Turkish government and eventually taken over by the Turkish State Railways. Söğütlüçeşme station became a stop on the Haydarpaşa suburban in 1951 and was electrified in 1969.

The current station was built between 1975 and 1979 and opened in 1985. In 2009 the Istanbul Metrobus was extended from Zincirlikuyu to Söğütlüçeşme, making Söğütlüçeşme became the first station on the Haydarpaşa suburban to be connected to the rest of Istanbul's public transport network.

== Vicinity ==
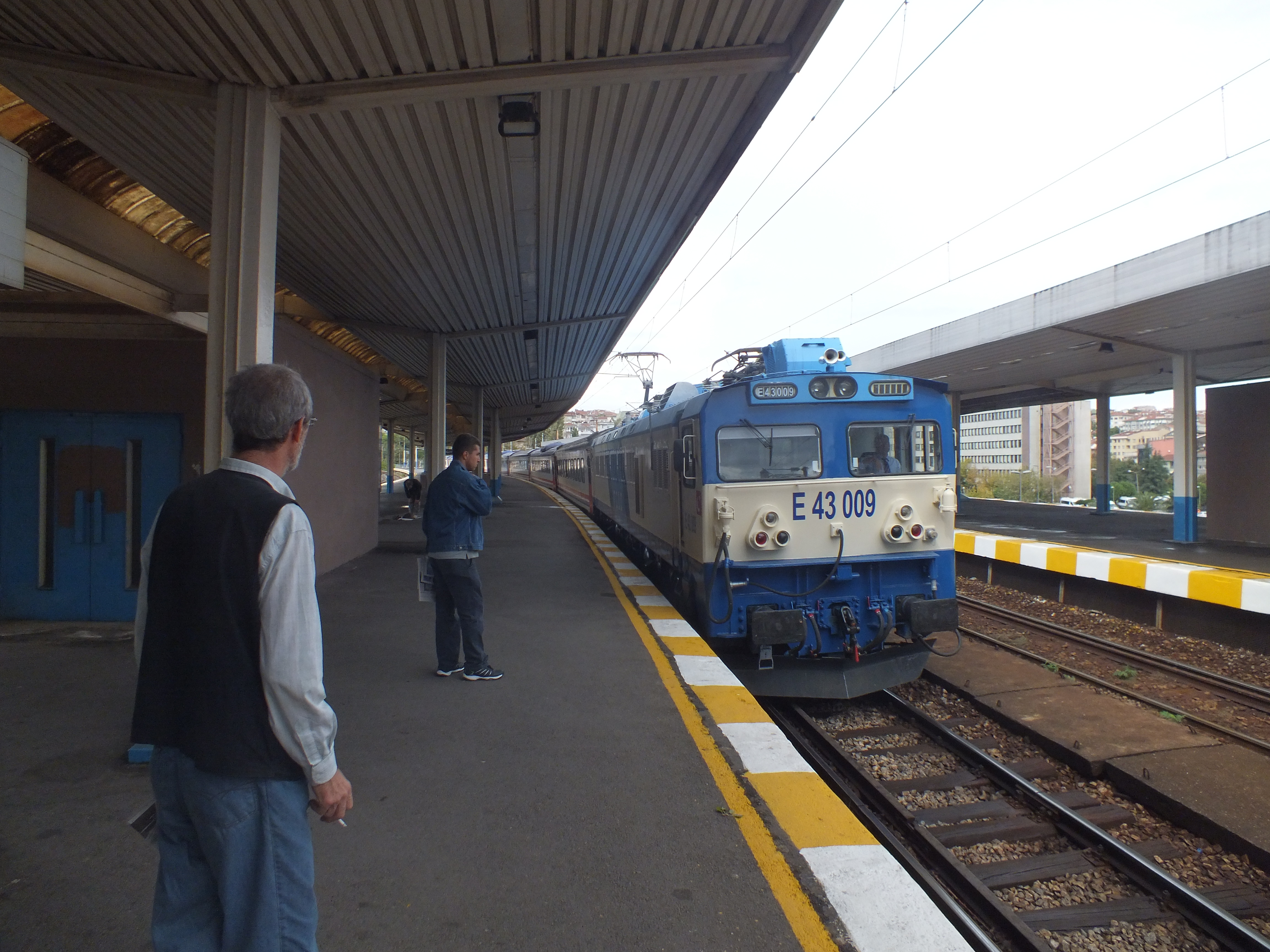
E43009 leads an eastbound intercity train into Sögütlücesme station.

Söğütlüçeşme station is located above Söğütlüçeşme park. To the north side of the station, connections to Metrobus service to Üsküdar, Levent and western Istanbul is available. The historic Kadıköy city center is located 650 m (2,130 ft) west of the station. Şükrü Saracoğlu Stadium, where Fenerbahçe S.K. plays, is situated directly southeast. Another important building in the vicinity is the Kadıkoy Municipality Headquarters, located directly north of the station. Alongside to the east of the station, the wedding hall building of the district Kadıköy is situated.

The neighborhoods surrounding Söğütlüçeşme station are Acıbadem to the northwest, Hasanpaşa directly north, Fikirtepe and Eğitim to the northeast, Zühtüpaşa to the southeast, Osmanağa and Caferağa (Kadıköy city center) directly south and Rasimpaşa to the southwest.

== Layout ==
Track 1
Island platform
Track 2
Track 3
Island platform
Track 4

== Public transport connections ==
Following public transportation lines serve the railway station:

Bus system

- 14B Kadıköy–Birlik Mahallesi
- 14ÇK Kadıköy–Ş. Şahinbey Mahallesi
- 14ES Kadıköy–Esenşehir
- 14ŞB Kadıköy–Ş. Şahinbey Mahallesi
- 19ES Kadıköy–Esenşehir Mahallesi
- 20D Kadıköy–Yenişehir-Dudullu
- 21Y Kadıköy–Yenisahra-Batı Ataşehir
- ER1 Kadıköy–Erenköy Ring
- FB1 Kadıköy–Fenerbahçe Ring
- GZ1 Kadıköy–Göztepe

Metrobus

- 34A Söğütlüçeşme–Edirnekapı
- 34G Söğütlüçeşme–(Tüyap)Beylikdüzü (Only Night)(G = Gece = Night)
- 34Z Söğütlüçeşme–Zincirlikuyu

== Gallery ==
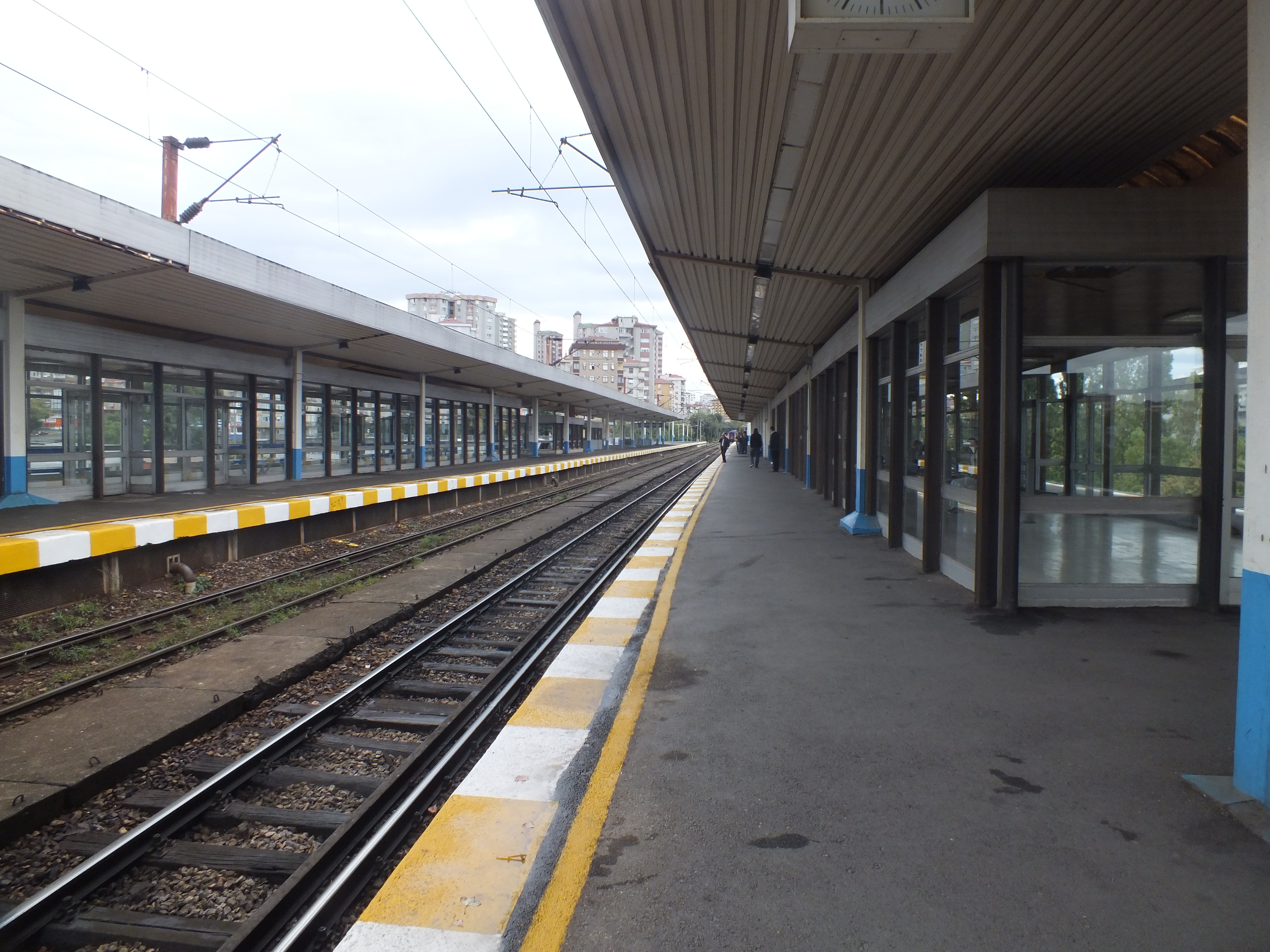
The station prior to reconstruction

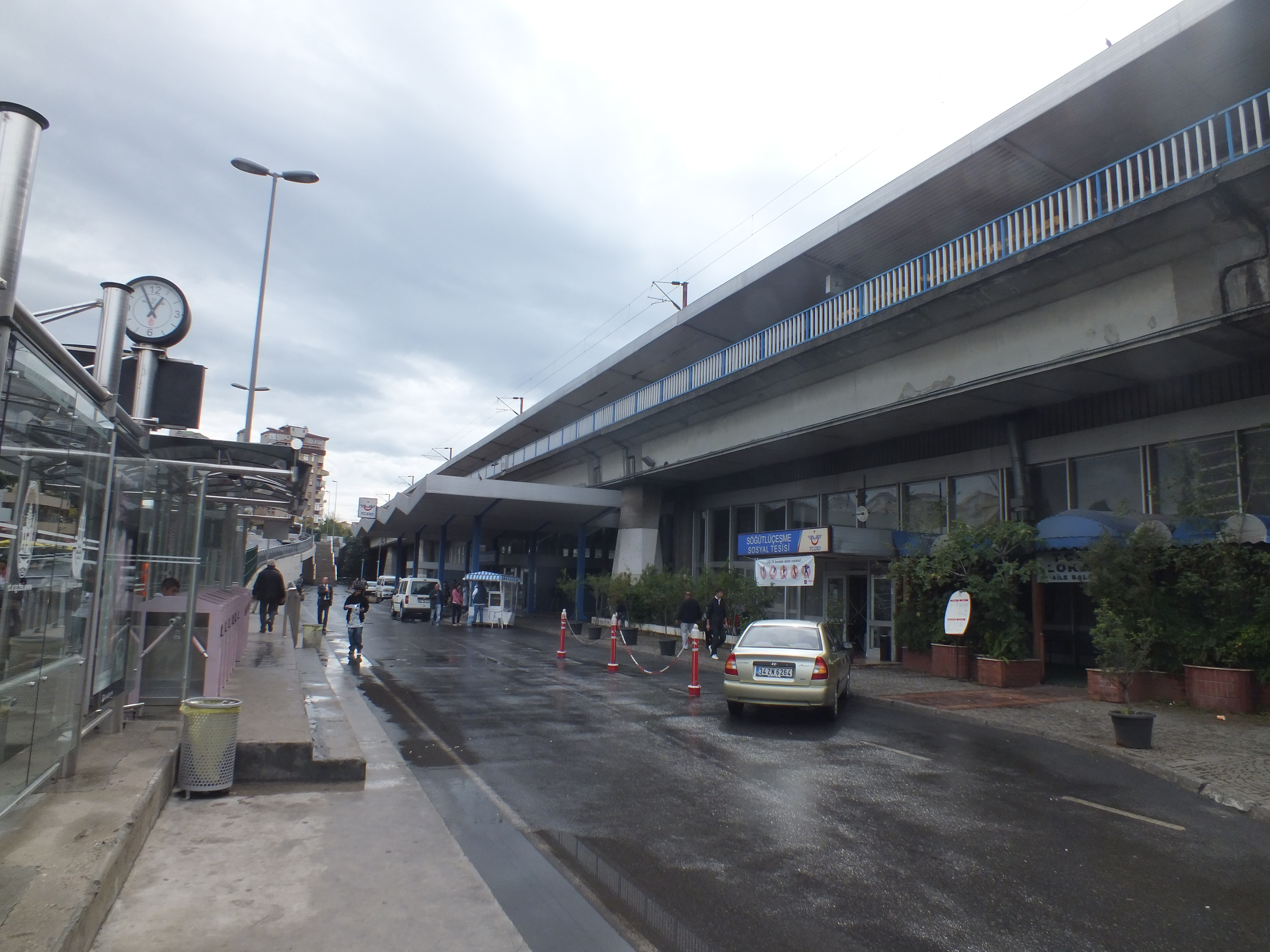
View of the station street-side (2011)

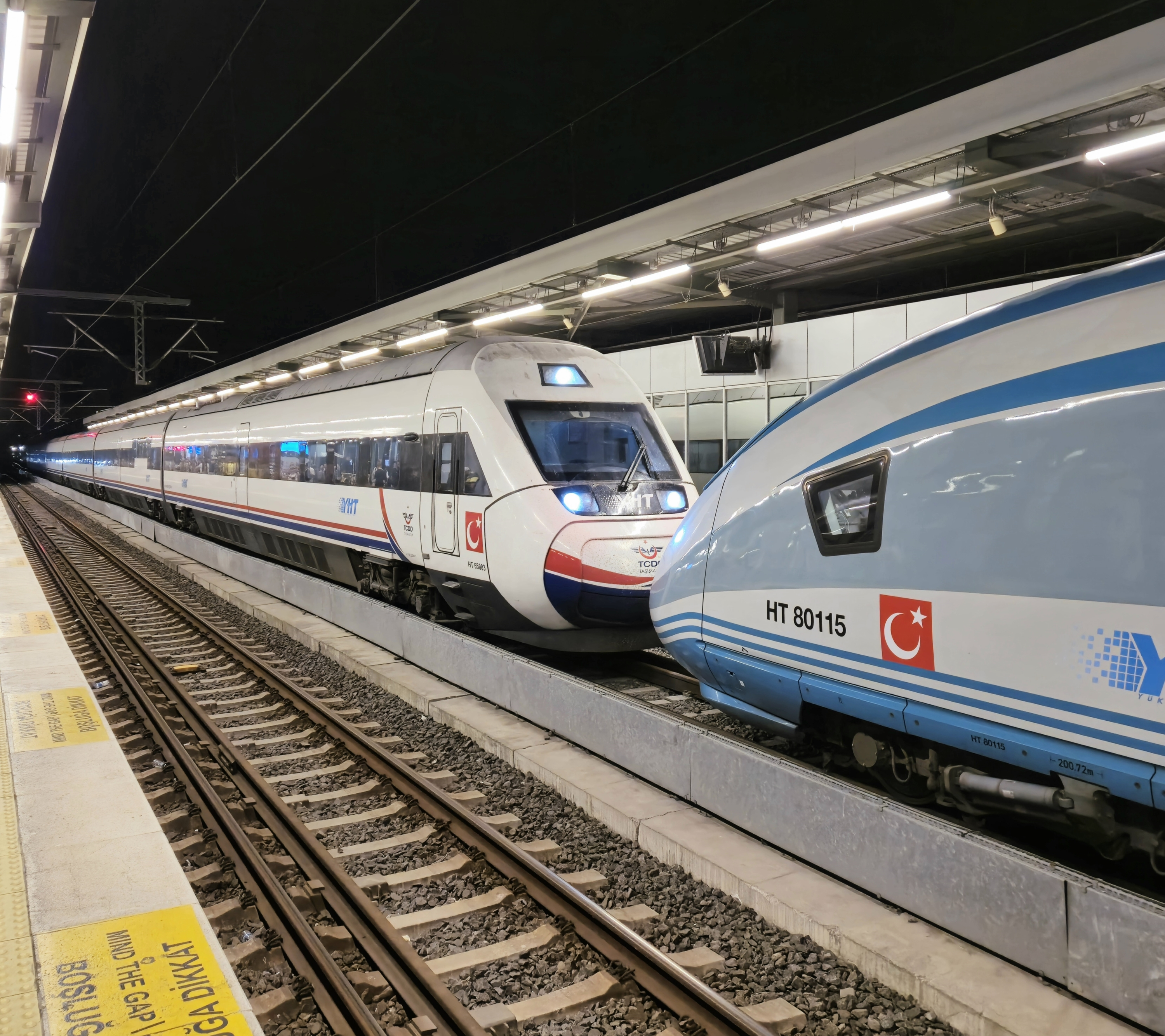
Turkish CAF and Siemens HSR sets together (2024)
