= Kızıltoprak railway station =

Kızıltoprak
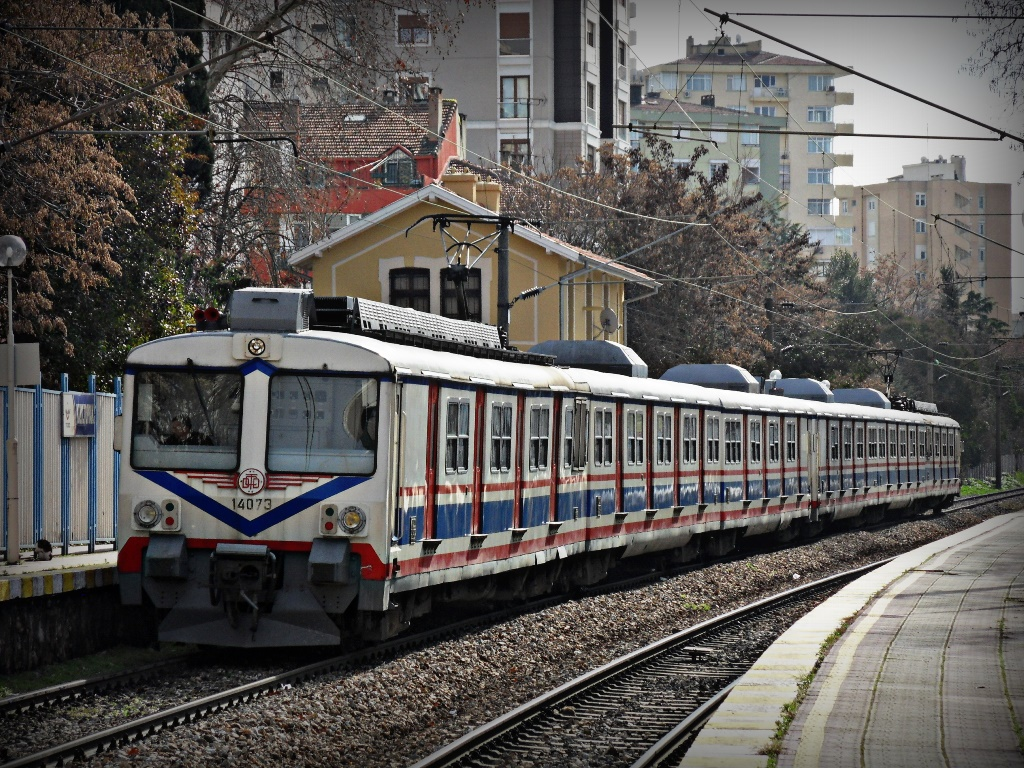
- A Haydarpaşa-bound commuter train arriving at the station, consisting of retired E14000 EMUs, in 2013.

General information
- Location: İstasyon Çk., Zühtüpaşa Mah. 34724; Kadıköy/Istanbul; Turkey
- Coordinates: 40.9847°N 29.0419°E
- Owner: Turkish State Railways
- Line: Haydarpaşa suburban
- Platforms: 2 side platforms
- Tracks: 2

Construction
- Structure type: At-grade
- Accessible: Yes

History
- Opened: 22 September 1872
- Closed: 19 February 2013
Former services
Preceding station	Turkish State Railways	Following station
Söğütlüçeşme towards Haydarpaşa	Haydarpaşa suburban	Feneryolu towards Gebze
Track layout
Location

Kızıltoprak railway station was a station in the Kızıltoprak quarter in Zühtüpaşa, Kadıköy, Istanbul. It consisted of two side platforms serving two tracks. The original station was built in 1872 by the Ottoman government as part of the railway from Istanbul to İzmit and taken over by the Ottoman Anatolian Railway in 1888. In 1949 the station was expanded by the Turkish State Railways to accommodate two tracks and 29 May 1969, electric commuter trains began serving the Kızıltoprak. The station was closed on 19 February 2013 when all commuter trains were suspended to make way for the new Marmaray commuter rail system. Along with Kanarya, Kızıltoprak station was closed down permanently in 2013 and the platforms were demolished shortly after.
