= Bostancı railway station =

Railway station in Turkey

Bostancı
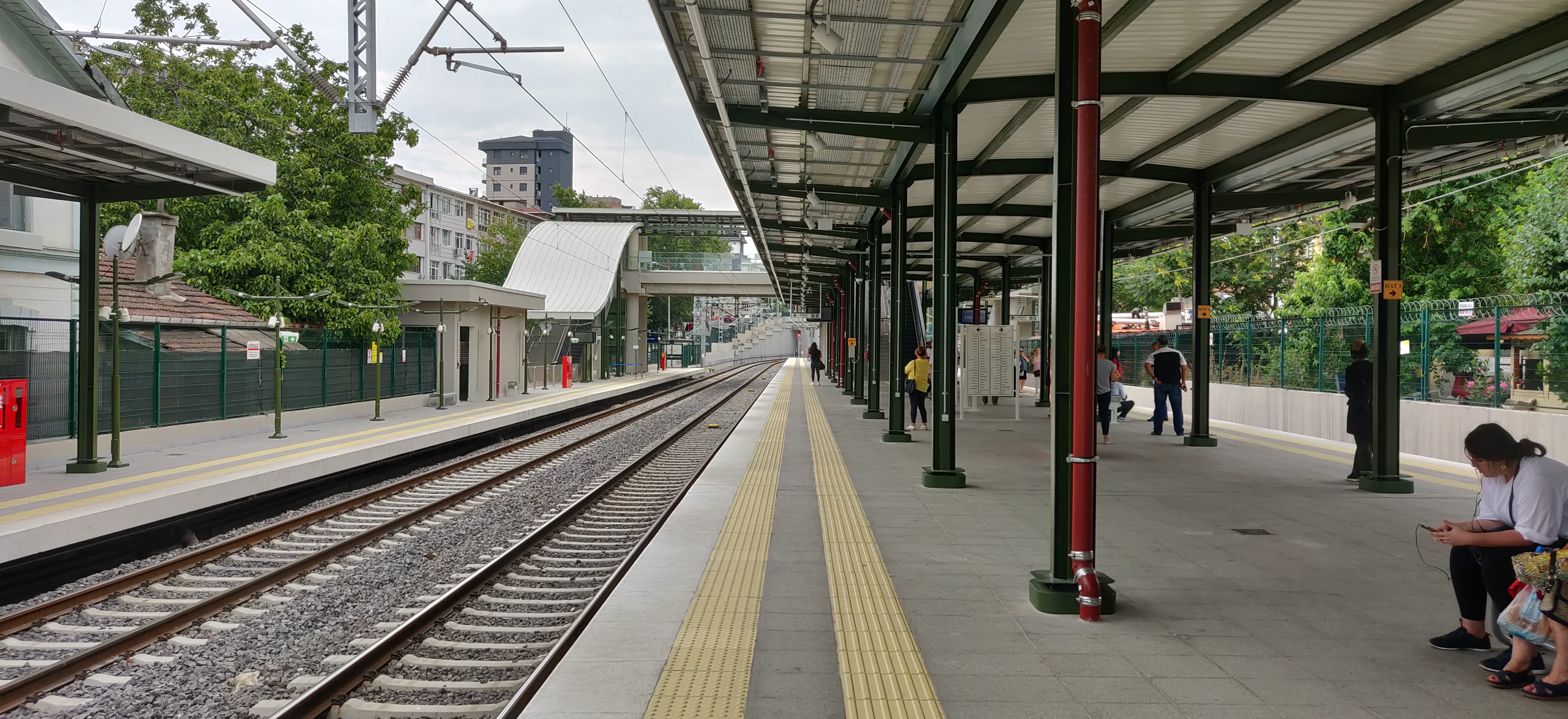
- The Marmaray platform on the right and the intercity platform on the left.

General information
- Location: Bağdat Cd., Bostancı Mah., 34744; Kadıköy, Istanbul; Turkey
- Coordinates: 40.95389°N 29.09522°E
- Owner: Turkish State Railways
- Operator: TCDD Taşımacılık
- Line: Istanbul-Ankara railway
- Platforms: 2 (1 island platform, 1 side platform)
- Tracks: 3
- Connections: Istanbul Metro: at Bostancı; Şehir Hatları at Bostancı Pier; İDO at Bostancı Terminal; IETT Bus: 2, 4, 10B, 16, 16D, 17, 17L, 17S, 19SB, 202, 222; Istanbul Minibus: Bostancı-S.Çeşme Metrobüs, Kadıköy-Bostancı, Bostancı-Kartal, Bostancı-Pendik

Other information
- Station code: 1522

History
- Opened: 22 September 1872
- Closed: 2013-18
- Rebuilt: 1910 (Station building); 2016-18 (Platforms)
- Electrified: 1969; 25 kV AC, 50 Hz Overhead wire

Services
Preceding station	TCDD Taşımacılık	Following station
Söğütlüçeşme towards Istanbul Halkalı	Yüksek Hızlı Tren	Pendik towards Ankara
Söğütlüçeşme towards Istanbul Halkalı	Yüksek Hızlı Tren	Pendik towards Karaman
Söğütlüçeşme towards Istanbul Halkalı	Ankara Express	Pendik towards Ankara
Suadiye towards Halkalı	Marmaray	Küçükyalı towards Gebze
Former services
Preceding station	Turkish State Railways	Following station
Söğütlüçeşme towards Istanbul	Capital Express	Pendik towards Ankara
Söğütlüçeşme towards Istanbul	Republic Express	Pendik towards Ankara
Söğütlüçeşme towards Istanbul	Fatih Express	Pendik towards Ankara
Söğütlüçeşme towards Istanbul	Boğaziçi Express	Pendik towards Ankara
Söğütlüçeşme towards Istanbul	Anatolian Express	Pendik towards Ankara
Söğütlüçeşme towards Istanbul	Ankara Express	Pendik towards Ankara
Söğütlüçeşme towards Istanbul	Eskişehir Express	Pendik towards Eskişehir
Söğütlüçeşme towards Istanbul	Sakarya Express	Pendik towards Eskişehir
Erenköy towards Istanbul	Adapazarı Express	Maltepe towards Adapazarı
Suadiye towards Haydarpaşa	Haydarpaşa suburban	Küçükyalı towards Gebze
Track layout
Location

Bostancı railway station (Turkish: Bostancı istasyonu) is a Turkish railway station in Kadıköy, Istanbul and is the easternmost station in the district. Located along Bağdat Avenue in the Bostancı neighborhood of Kadıköy, it was a station on the Haydarpaşa suburban between 1951 and 2013, when the railway between Haydarpaşa and Pendik was closed. On 12 March 2019 the station reopened to Marmaray commuter rail service. Prior to 2012, the station was also serviced by many intercity trains to Ankara and Anatolia as well as frequent regional train service to Adapazarı. Bostancı station is 8.64 km (5.37 mi) away from Haydarpaşa Terminal.

== History ==
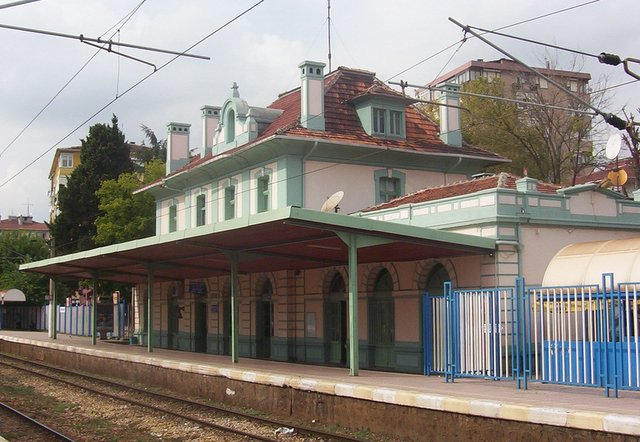
Bostancı station in 2005.

Bostancı station was originally built by the Ottoman government, as part of a railway from Kadıköy to İzmit, and was opened on 22 September 1872. The station, along with the railway, was sold to the Ottoman Anatolian Railway (CFOA) which operated the railway until 1924. In 1909, the CFOA began frequent train service from Haydarpaşa and Pendik, stopping at Bostancı station, which was expanded and rebuilt in 1910. Frequent service to Bostancı promoted development in the area. Many houses with large gardens were built around the station for Constantinople's wealthy residents, who used the train service to commute into the city. In 1912-1913, a ferry pier was built, just 90 m (300 ft) south of the station.

In 1924, the CFOA went through a process of nationalization by the newly formed Republic of Turkey. In that year, the CFOA was bought by the Turkish government and merged with the Baghdad Railway into the Anatolian—Baghdad Railways (CFAB). In 1927, the CFAB was bought by the State Railways and Seaports Administration, the direct successor of the Turkish State Railways.

The State Railways double-tracked the railway from Haydarpaşa to Gebze in 1949 and in 1951 began commuter rail service on the line. The station was electrified in 1969 with overhead wire, when TCDD began operating electric commuter rail service. In the 1980s, the waterfront of Bostancı was extended approximately 90 m (300 ft) outward, via land reclamation, extending the distance between the station and the ferry pier. On 31 March 2004, the station was given heritage status protecting the station building in anticipation of the Marmaray project. Intercity train service was discontinued west of Arifiye in 2012, followed by all train service in 2013 for the construction of the Marmaray commuter rail system. The rails were torn up shortly after but construction halted due to problems with the contractor. Construction restarted in 2016 with the demolition of the station platforms. Bostancı station opened on 12 March 2019, along with the entire Marmaray rail line.

== Layout ==
The pre-Marmaray Bostancı station consisted of 1 island platform and 1 side platform serving three tracks. Since the railway was only double-tracked, the third track (south side) was used as a passing loop to allow intercity or regional trains to pass local commuter trains. The third track would diverge from the main tracks before the station and connect back after the station. On the west side, the third track crossed the eastbound and connected to the westbound track and on the east side, the third track connected to only the eastbound track. The middle platform could be accessed via an underpass from Bağdat Avenue to Bahçelerarası Street, on the other side. The station building is located on the north side of the station and will not be altered or demolished, due to its heritage status.

== Connections ==
Connections to IETT city bus service and Istanbul Minibus service as well İDO and Şehir Hatları ferry service is available. Bus service can be accessed via two stops, one on Bağdat Avenue and one on Çetin Emeç Boulevard, on the waterfront. Ferry service can be accessed from two landings; Municipal Şehir Hatları ferries stop at the historic Bostancı Pier, while İDO sea-bus ferries stop at the adjacent Bostancı Ferry Terminal.

A 14.2 km (8.8 mi) long metro line to Dudullu connects to Bostancı station. The line was opened in 2023.
