= Bakırköy railway station =

Railway station in Bakırköy, Istanbul, Turkey

Bakırköy
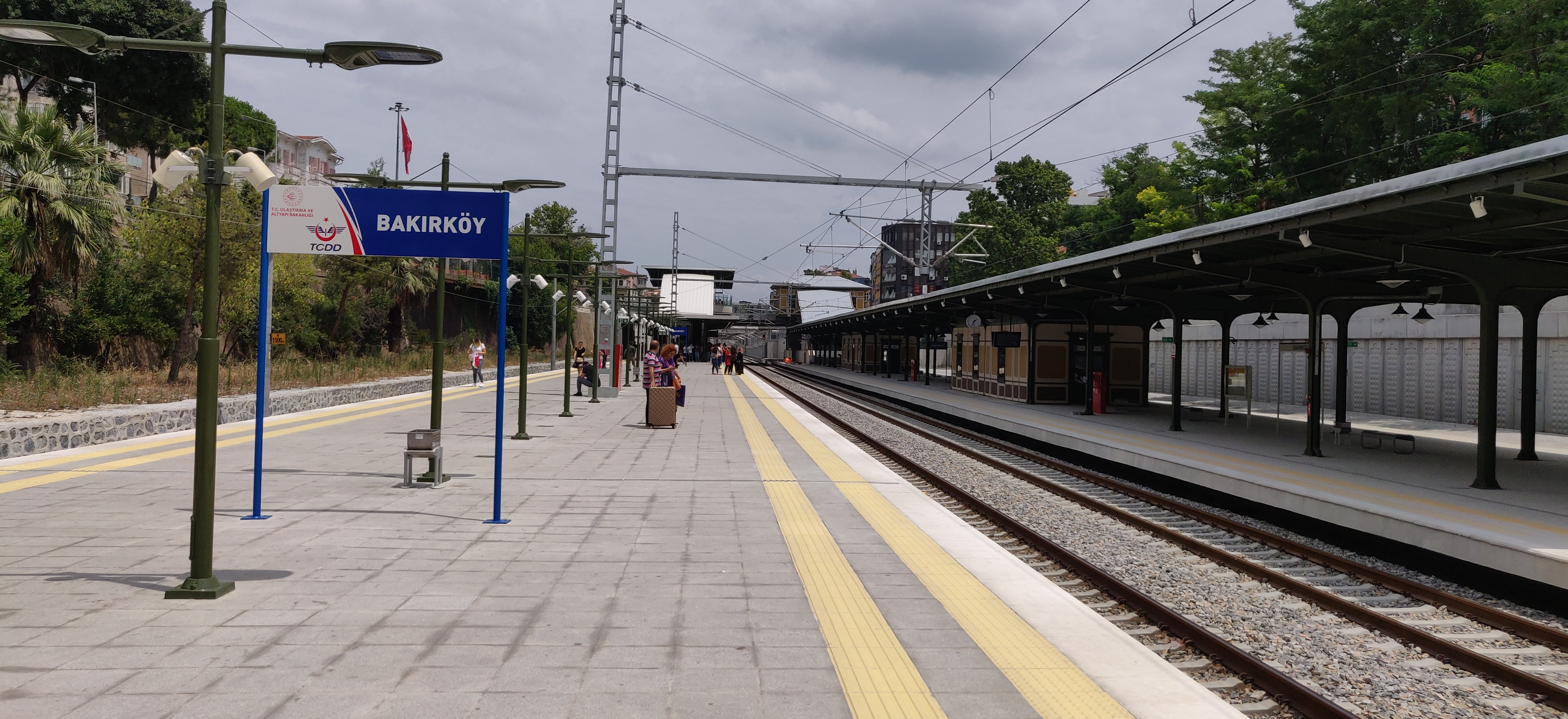
- Looking east from the Marmaray platform. The TCCDT platform is visible on the right.

General information
- Location: İstasyon Cd, Cevizlik Mh, İstanbul, Turkey
- Coordinates: 40.980374°N 28.872133°E
- Owner: Turkish State Railways
- Operator: TCDD Taşımacılık
- Line: Istanbul-Pythion railway
- Platforms: 2 island platforms
- Tracks: 4
- Connections: Istanbul Metro: at Özgürlük Meydanı İETT Bus: 50B, 73B, 76, 76B, 76C, 76V, 76Y, 79B, 89YB, 98, 98A, 98AB, 98B, 98D, 98E, 98G, 98H, 98K, 98M, 98MB, 98S, 98T, 98TB, 98Y, 146; Istanbul Minibus: Bakırköy-Bakırköy Metro, Bakırköy-İkitelli, Bakırköy-İkitelli Köyiçi, Bakırköy-İSTOÇ, Bakırköy-Polis Lojmanları, Bakırköy-Soğanlı, Bakırköy-Yenibosna Metro, Bakırköy Metro-Barbaros Mahallesi, Bakırköy Metro-İSTOÇ, Bakırköy Metro-Ormantepe-Kocasinan Mahallesi, Bakırköy Metro-Yenibosna Metro, Bakırköy Metro-Yenimahalle Metro

Construction
- Structure type: Embanked
- Parking: No
- Accessible: Yes

History
- Opened: 4 January 1871
- Rebuilt: 1955, 20
- Electrified: 1955 (25 kV AC)

Services
Preceding station	TCDD Taşımacılık	Following station
Istanbul Halkalı Terminus	Yüksek Hızlı Tren	Söğütlüçeşme towards Ankara
Istanbul Halkalı Terminus	Yüksek Hızlı Tren	Söğütlüçeşme towards Karaman
Istanbul Halkalı Terminus	Ankara Express	Söğütlüçeşme towards Ankara
Ataköy towards Halkalı	Marmaray	Yenimahalle towards Gebze
Former services
Preceding station	Turkish State Railways	Following station
Yeşilyurt towards Halkalı	Istanbul suburban	Yenimahalle towards Sirkeci
Location
- Location within Istanbul Location within Turkey

Bakırköy railway station (Turkish: Bakırköy istasyonu) is the main railway station in Bakırköy, Istanbul. Located 12.6 km (7.8 mi) west of Sirkeci station, the station was serviced by Istanbul suburban commuter trains as well as TCDD regional trains to Kapıkule, Çerkezköy and Uzunköprü. The station was closed in March 2013 and subsequently demolished to make way for a larger, more modern station as part of the Marmaray project. The rebuilt station was opened on 12 March 2019. The station has an interchange with Özgürlük Meydanı station of the M3 metro line.

The new Bakırköy station has two platforms serving four tracks.

== Gallery ==
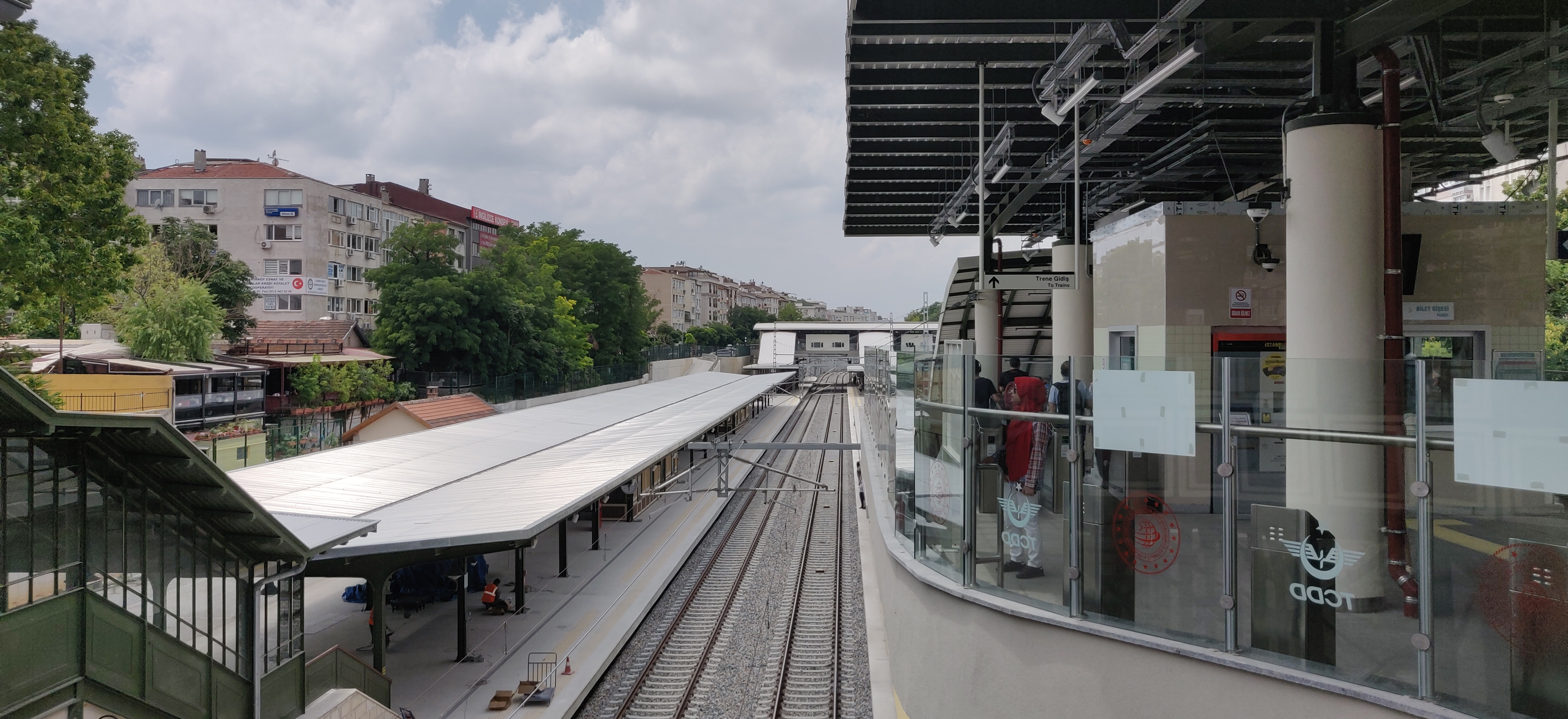
Looking west from the overpass.

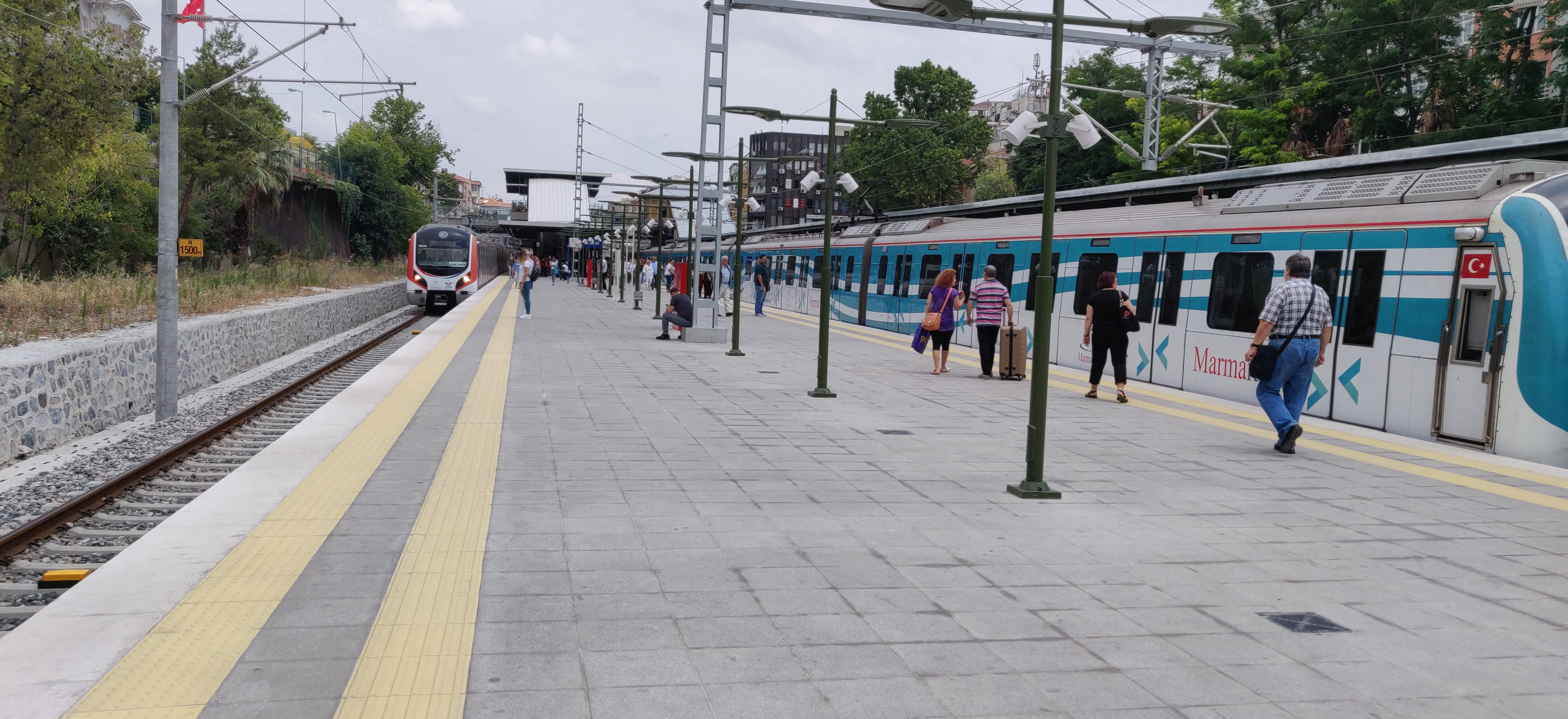
Two Marmaray trains at the station.

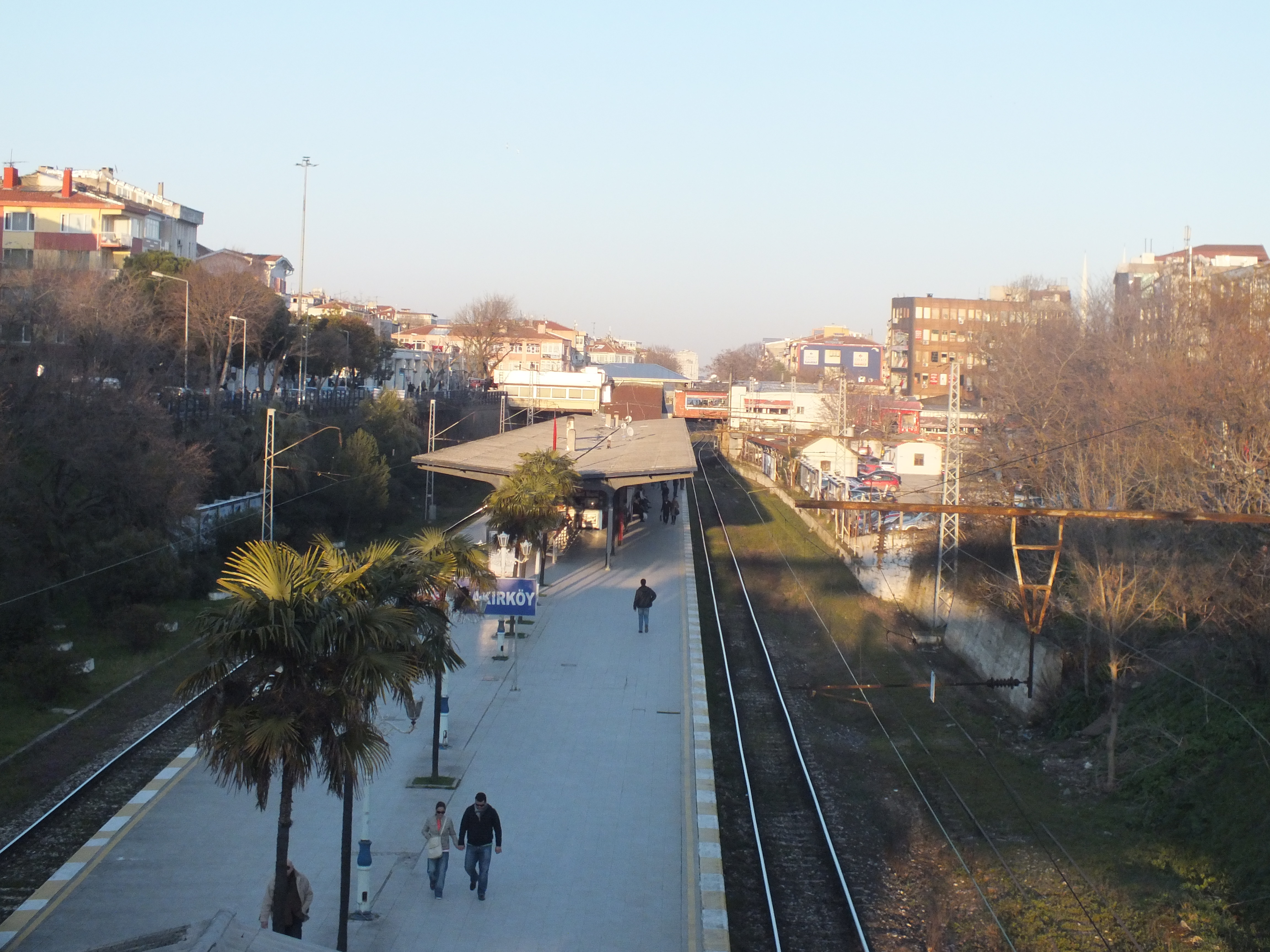
Bakırköy station before its renovation and expansion.
