= Zeytinburnu railway station =

Railway station in Zeytinburnu, Istanbul, Turkey

ZEYTİNBURNU
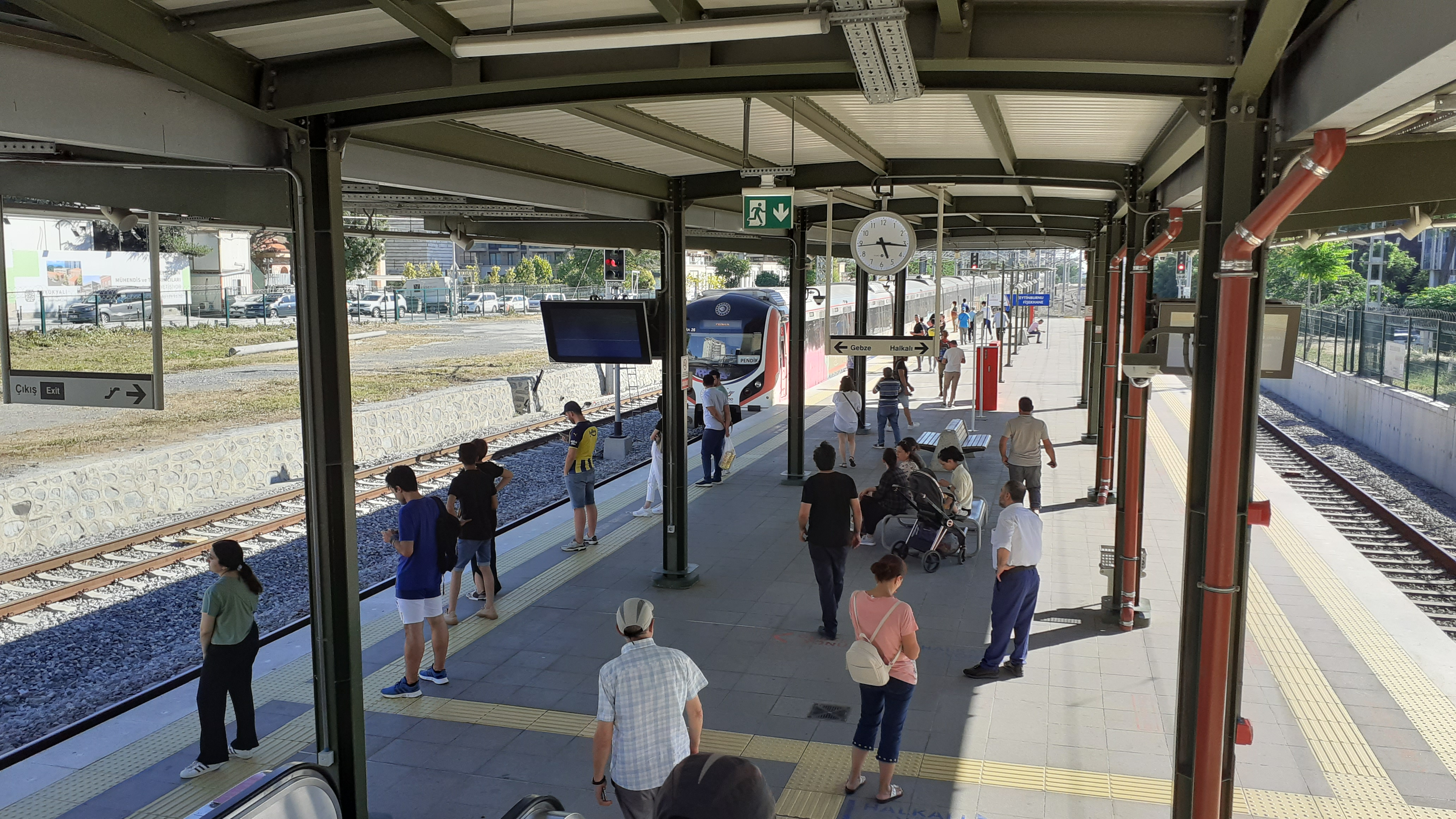

General information
- Location: Zübeyda Hanım Cd., Kazlıçeşme Mah. 34020; Zeytinburnu/Istanbul; Turkey
- Coordinates: 40.9857°N 28.9053°E
- Owner: Turkish State Railways
- Line: Istanbul-Pythion railway
- Platforms: 1 island platform
- Tracks: 2
- Connections: İETT Bus: 93, 93C, 93M, 93T, MR10; Istanbul Minibus: Cevizlibağ-Yenimahalle, Topkapı-Zeytinburnu

Construction
- Parking: No

History
- Opened: 4 December 1955
- Closed: 2013-18
- Electrified: 4 December 1955; 25 kV AC, 60 Hz overhead wire

Services
Preceding station	TCDD Taşımacılık	Following station
Yeni Mahalle towards Halkalı	Marmaray	Kazlıçeşme towards Gebze
Former services
Preceding station	Turkish State Railways	Following station
Yeni Mahalle towards Halkalı	Istanbul suburban	Kazlıçeşme towards Sirkeci
Location

Zeytinburnu station (Turkish: Zeytinburnu istasyonu) is an under construction station in Zeytinburnu, Istanbul. The new platform will replace the 62 year old station opened in 1955. The original station was opened on 4 December 1955 as part of the Istanbul suburban commuter rail service between Sirkeci and Halkalı. Today it is part of the Marmaray suburban line.
