= Göztepe railway station =

GÖZTEPE
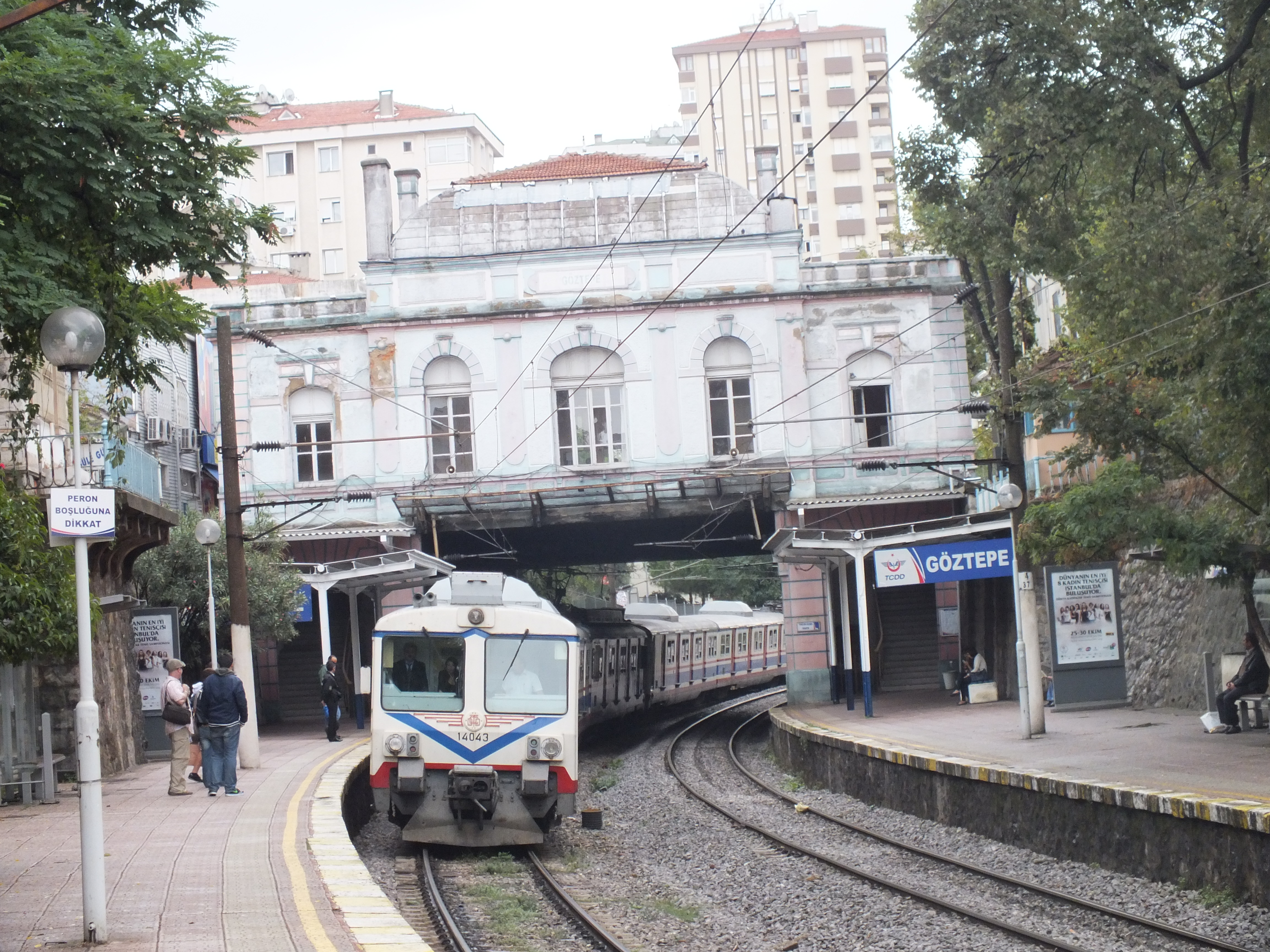
- A westbound train enters under the historical station building.

General information
- Location: Tütüncü Mehmet Efendi Cd. 85, Göztepe Mah. 34730; Kadıköy/Istanbul; Turkey
- Coordinates: 40.9790°N 29.0666°E
- Owner: Turkish State Railways
- Operator: TCDD Taşımacılık
- Line: Istanbul-Ankara railway
- Platforms: 2 side platforms
- Tracks: 2
- Connections: İETT Bus: 4, 16, 16D, ER1, ER2, FB1, FB2, GZ1, GZ2; Istanbul Minibus: Kadıköy–Bostancı, Bostancı-Söğütlüçeşme metrobüs

Construction
- Architectural style: Turkish Neoclassical

History
- Opened: 1876
- Closed: 2013-18
- Rebuilt: 1915 (Station house); 2017-18 (Platforms)
- Former names: Erenköy (1876-98)

Services
| Preceding station | TCDD Taşımacılık | Following station |
|---|---|---|
| Feneryolu towards Halkalı | Marmaray | Erenköy towards Gebze |
Former services
| Preceding station | Turkish State Railways | Following station |
|---|---|---|
| Feneryolu towards Haydarpaşa | Haydarpaşa suburban | Erenköy towards Gebze |
Track layout
Location

Göztepe station (Turkish: Göztepe İstasyonu) is a historical railway station in Kadıköy, Istanbul. Between 1969 and 2013, it was a station on the Haydarpaşa suburban railway line to Gebze. A modern station of the same name is now a stop on the Marmaray commuter rail service to Gebze.

The station was originally built in 1876 by the Ottoman government as part of the railway from Istanbul to İzmit. A small two-story wooden station house was built and is currently on the northern part of the station. Due to a steep climb just west of the station, trains weren't able to always make it up during snowy weather; so in 1915 the tracks were lowered by 11 m (36 ft) and a new, larger station house was built over the tracks in the Turkish Neoclassical style.

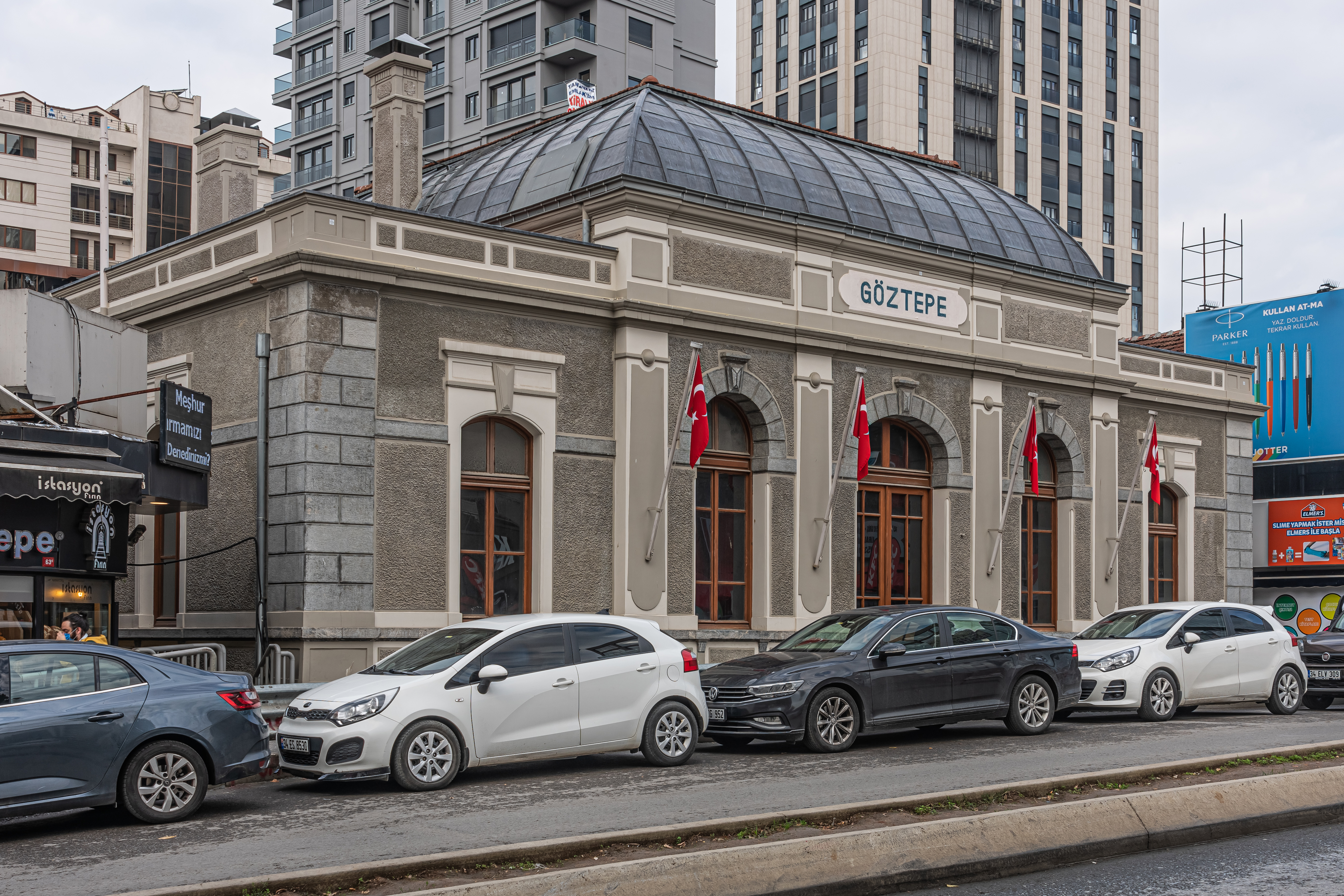
Old station building, street side

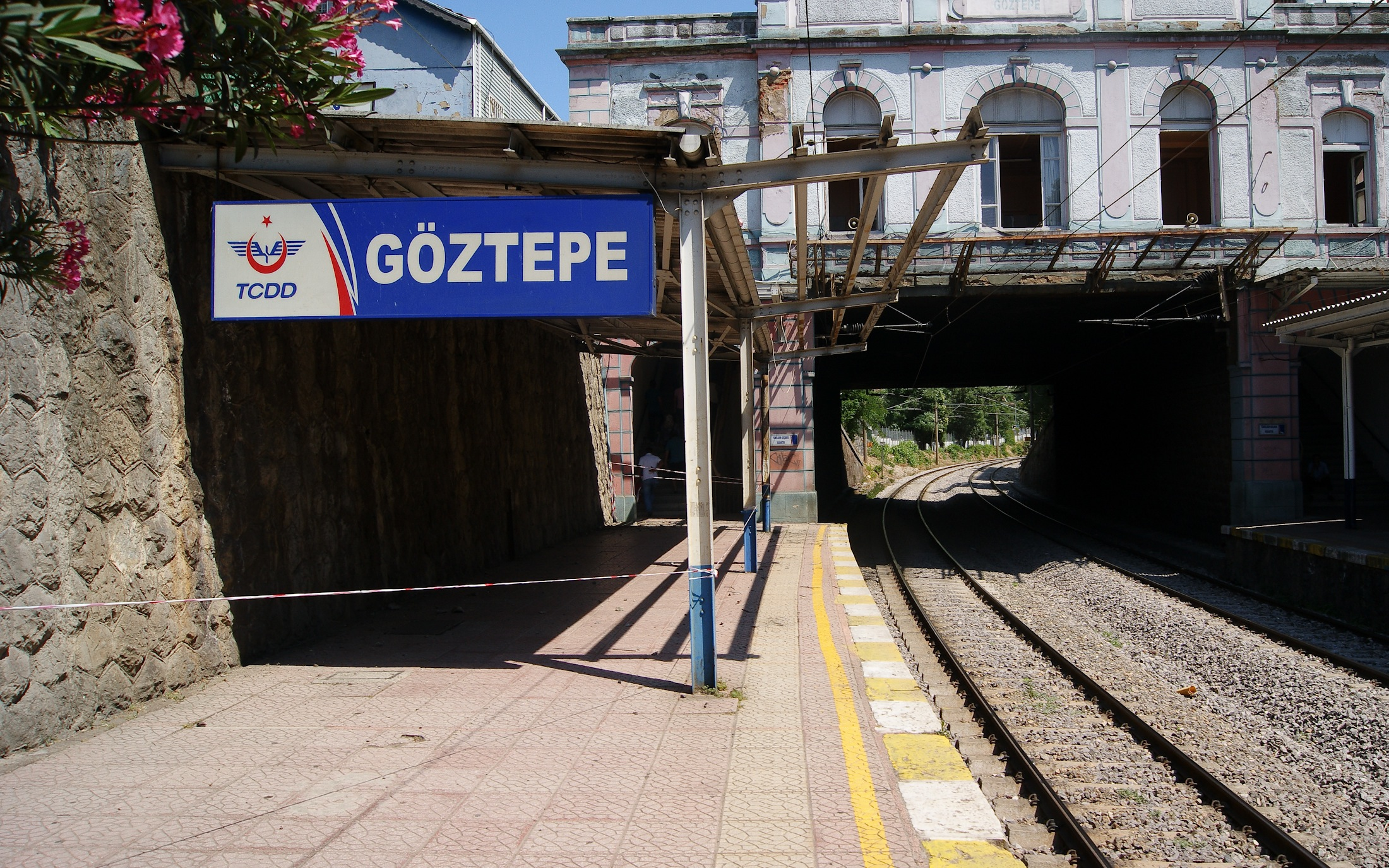
Platform before 2013

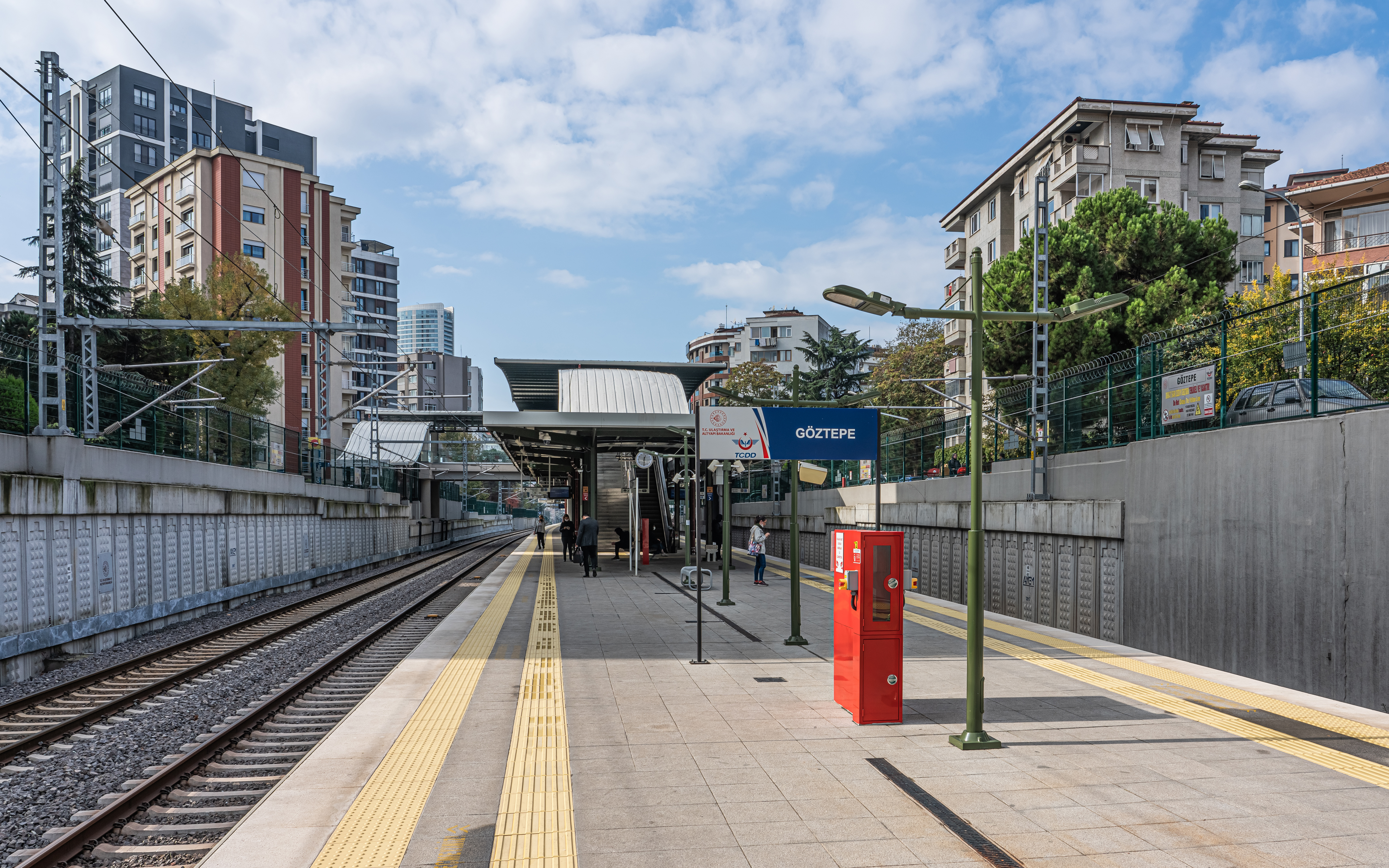
The Marmaray platform since 2017
