= Yenimahalle railway station =

Railway station in Bakırköy, Istanbul, Turkey

Yenimahalle
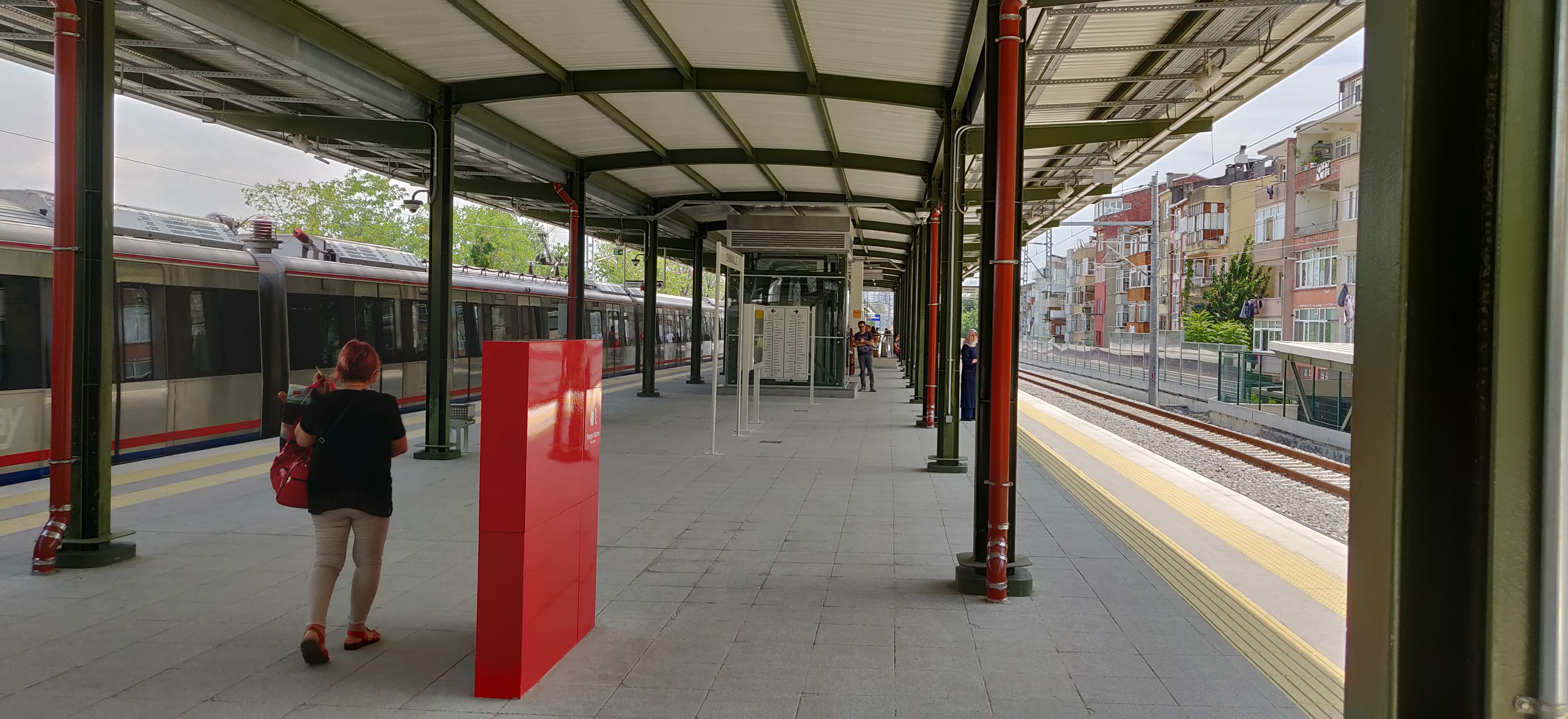
- A westbound Marmaray train at the station.

General information
- Location: 10 Temmuz Cd., Yenimahalle 34020; Bakırköy, Istanbul; Turkey
- Coordinates: 40.9858°N 28.9054°E
- Owner: Turkish State Railways
- Operator: TCDD Taşımacılık
- Line: Istanbul-Pythion railway
- Platforms: 1 island platform
- Tracks: 3
- Connections: Istanbul Minibus: Cevizlibağ-Yenimahalle, Topkapı-Merter, Topkapı-Yenimahalle, Topkapı-Zeytinburnu

Construction
- Parking: No
- Accessible: Yes

History
- Opened: 4 December 1955
- Closed: 2013-18
- Rebuilt: 2016-18
- Electrified: 1955; 25 kV AC, 50 Hz Overhead wire

Services
Preceding station	TCDD Taşımacılık	Following station
Bakırköy towards Halkalı	Marmaray	Zeytinburnu towards Gebze
Former services
Preceding station	Turkish State Railways	Following station
Bakırköy towards Halkalı	Istanbul suburban	Kazlıçeşme towards Sirkeci
Location

Yenimahalle railway station (Turkish: Yenimahalle istasyonu) is a railway station in Bakırköy, Istanbul. The station was originally built in 1955 as a stop on the Istanbul suburban commuter rail line until 2013, when the entire line was closed down for expansion and renovation. Yenimahalle station was demolished and a third track was added. The new station entered service on 12 March 2019 and become a stop on the Marmaray commuter rail line.
