= Saint Gregory the Illuminator Church of Galata =

Armenian Church in Istanbul, Turkey

Saint Gregory the Illuminator Church
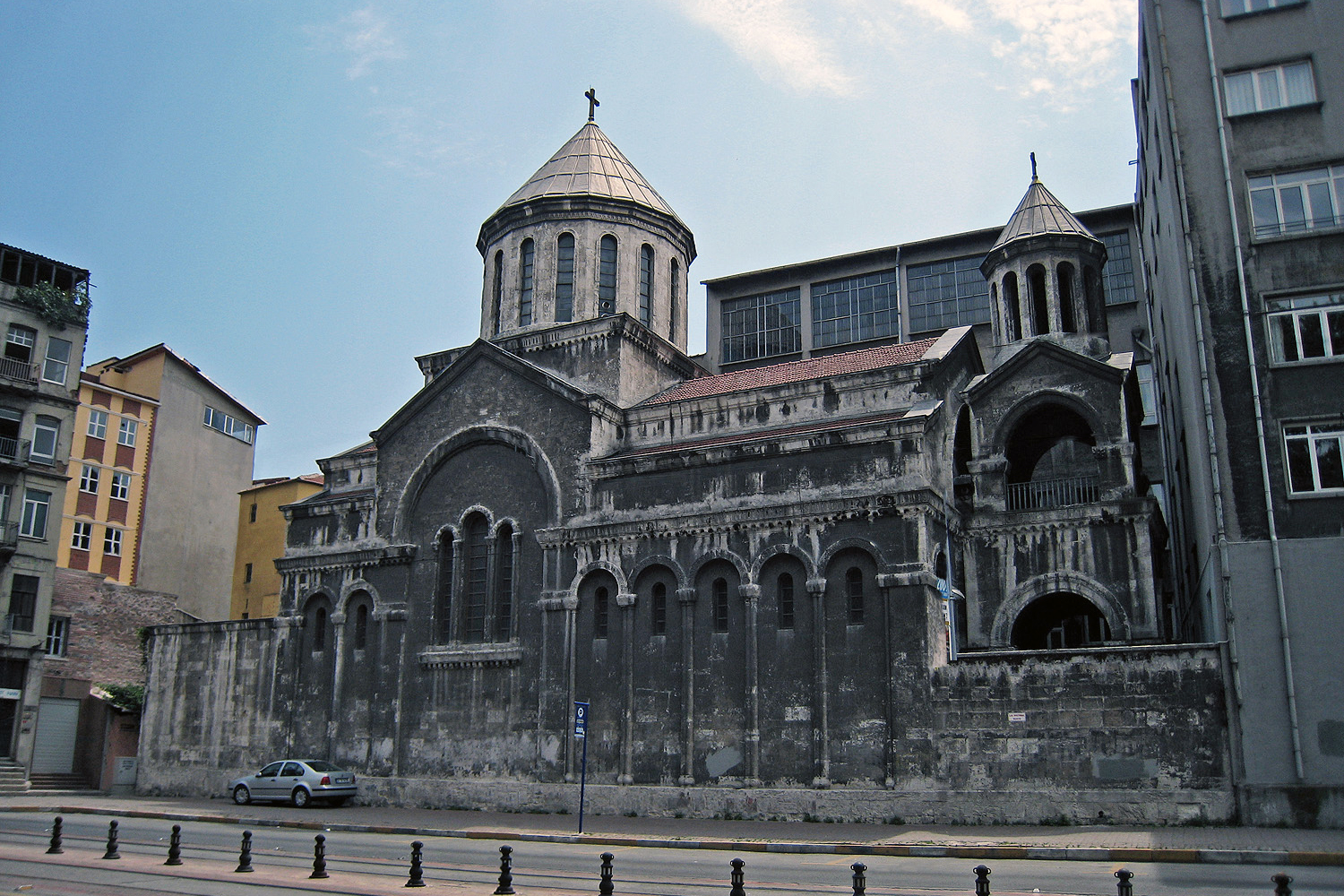
- The church in 2007

- Location of the church in European Istanbul

Religion
- Affiliation: Armenian Apostolic Church
- Status: Active

Location
- Location: Kemeraltı, Sakızcılar Sok. No: 9, Karaköy, Istanbul, Turkey
- Coordinates: 41.0257°N 28.9785°E

Architecture
- Style: Armenian
- Completed: 1391 (textual evidence); 1436 (oldest inscription)

Specifications
- Length: 29.25 metres (96.0 ft)
- Width: 11.7 metres (38 ft)

The Saint Gregory the Illuminator Church of Galata (Armenian: Ղալաթայի Սուրբ Գրիգոր Լուսաւորիչ եկեղեցի, romanized: Ghalat’ayi Surp Krikor Lusavorich yegeghetsi; Turkish: Surp Krikor Lusavoriç Ermeni Kilisesi) is the oldest extant Armenian Apostolic church in Istanbul. It was originally built in the late 14th century, in the Genoan period, shortly before the fall of Constantinople to the Ottomans. The church was demolished in 1958 and the current building is a reconstruction from the 1960s.

Located in the Galata neighbourhood, it is the city's only church built in the traditional style of Armenian church architecture—namely with a dome with a conical roof. The Getronagan Armenian High School was established in 1886 next to the church.

== History ==
=== Foundation ===
It is the oldest of Istanbul's Armenian 35 churches. (Note: The Armenian Patriarchate of Constantinople lists 35 Armenian churches in Istanbul: 27 in the European part, 7 in the Asian part, and 1 in Kınalıada island.) According to a manuscript formerly kept at the Armash monastery the church was founded in 1391 by an Armenian merchant named Kozma (Italian: Cosimo) from Kaffa (now Feodosia) in Crimea who bought the land on which it was built. Galata at the time was a Genoese colony and the Armenians found more protection under their control rather than that of the Byzantine Empire. The blacksmith Aved built the altar of the church as well as the Holy Cross chapel near the church. First concrete evidence of the existence of the church comes from two 1431 inscriptions on the church. The date is sometimes cited as the foundation date of the church.

Historian Kevork Pamukciyan believes that the current church was built on the location of St. Sargis, an Armenian church in Galata, mentioned in two Armenian manuscripts from 1360 and 1361.

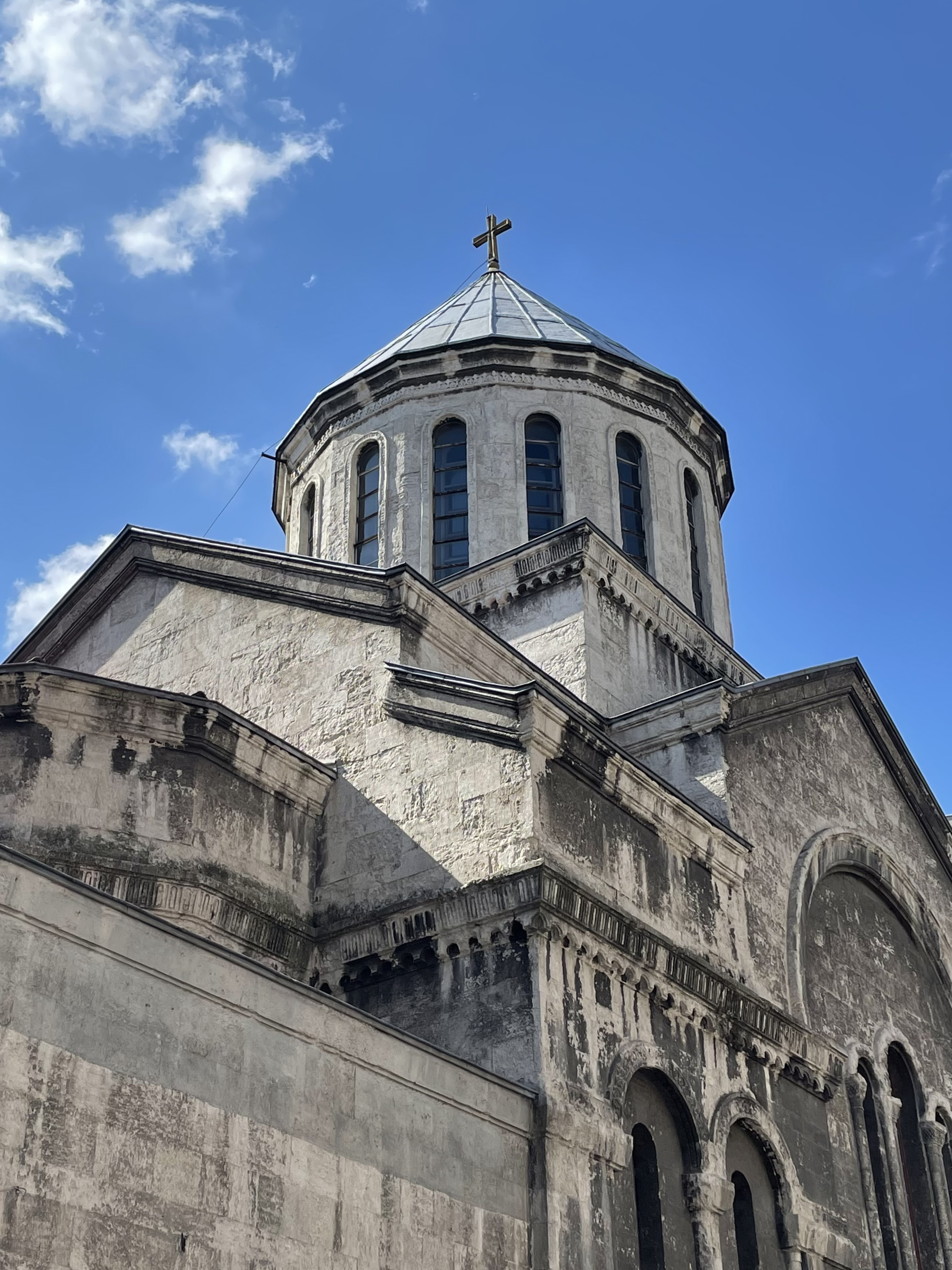
Side view

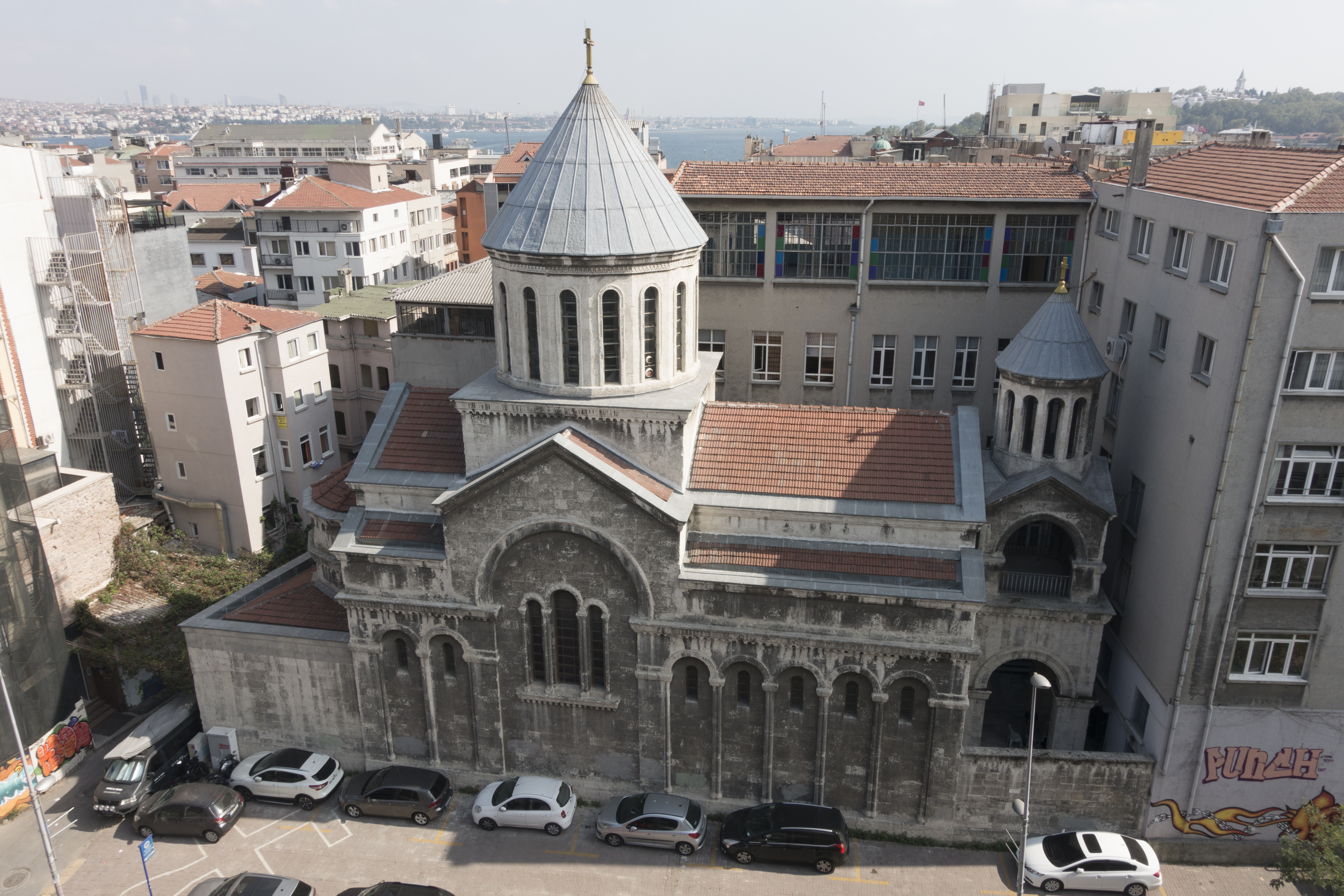
View from above

=== Later history ===
The church and an Armenian quarter around it are recorded in an Ottoman survey from 1455 which indicated the "continuation of the Byzantine Armenian presence into the Ottoman period."

In 1635 Patriarch Grigor Kesaratsi (Gregory of Caesarea) was buried at the wall of the church by Shahin Çelebi, a wealthy Armenian.

The church was often damaged by fires. It survived the Galata fire of 1660. It burned almost entirely in 1731 and was restored in 1733 by Sargis Khalfa, during the tenure of the Patriarch Hovhannes Golod. The church was again burned almost completely in 1771. It was restored 28 years later, in 1799 by the architect Minas Khalfa who added the chapel of Surb Karapet ("Holy Precursor", i.e. John the Baptist). In 1888 the church and the two chapels joined and turned into one when the interior walls were taken down.

The crypt of Hovhannes Golod (d. 1741), located under the church, is decorated with black-and-white Kütahya and Dutch tiles. The original church, richly decorated with tiles, included French, Italian, Chinese porcelain, and Tunisian tiles. They were probably added during an 18th-century restoration.

The church was visited and described by European visitors such as Antoine Galland (1672), Joseph Pitton de Tournefort (early 1700s), and William Holden Hutton (c. 1900). The latter wrote that it "contains some fine [manuscripts] and a sacred picture of Christ, of great antiquity."

In 1879 Malachia Ormanian, the future Armenian Patriarch of Constantinople and a historian, served as a priest at the church early in his life.

=== Demolition and reconstruction ===
The church was expropriated by the state and demolished in May 1958 to widen the street as part of large-scale reconstruction in Istanbul in the Adnan Menderes period. In 1962 architect Bedros Zobyan designed a reconstruction plan for the church. It was completed in four years due to financial difficulties. The church was reconsecrated in 1965, but the official opening ceremony took place on May 15, 1966 and was presided over by Patriarch Shenork I Kaloustian. The new church is almost half as wide as the original, measuring 11.7 by 29.25 metres (38.4 by 96.0 ft). Due to the limited space allocated for the church, a basement was built to house the chapel and the grave of Hovhannes Golod (below the bell tower) and a balcony for the choir.

The church underwent renovations in 2005 and 2011.
