= Feneryolu railway station =

FENERYOLU
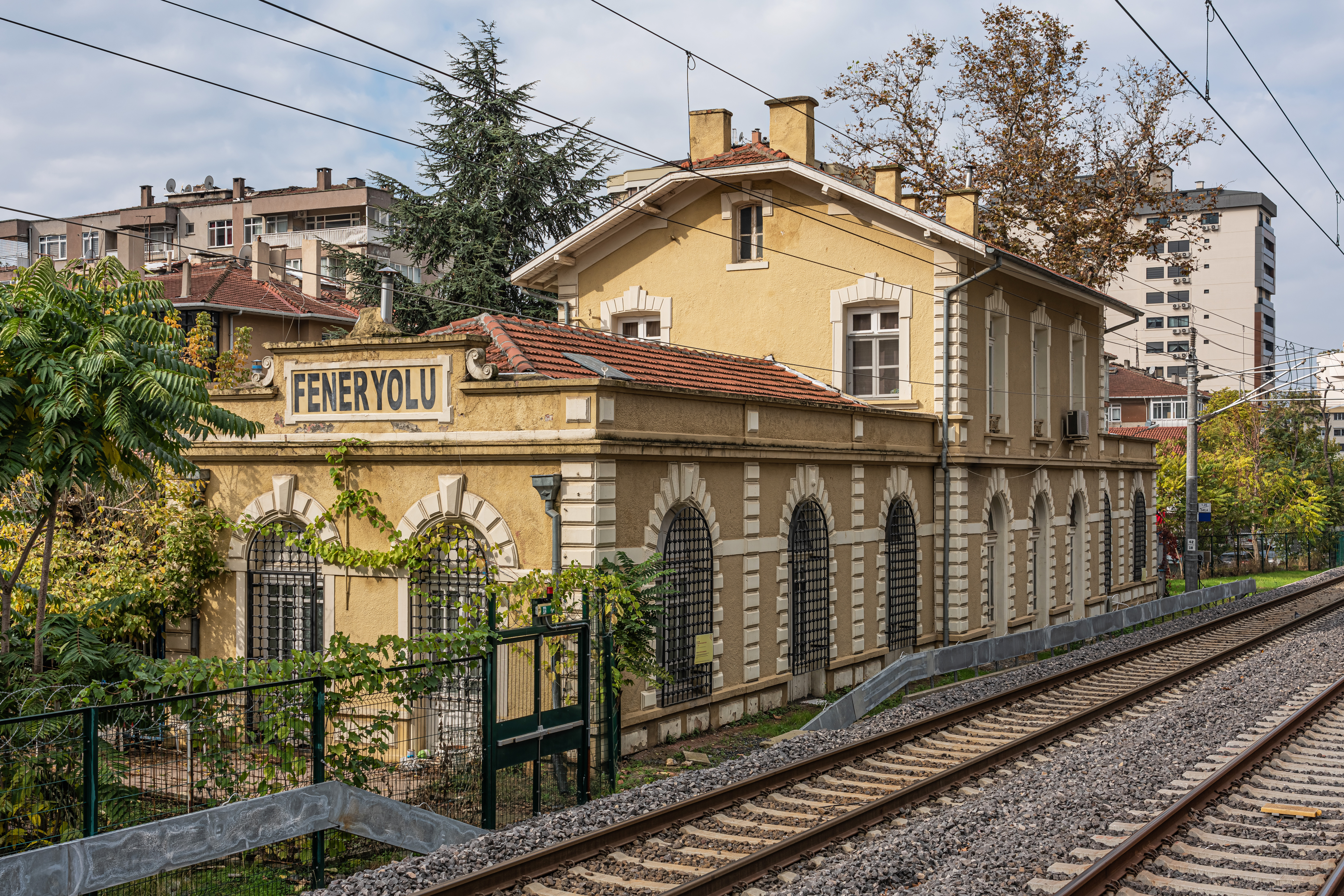
- The old Feneryolu station in 2021.

General information
- Location: Gazi Muhtar Paşa Sk., Fenerylu Mah. 34724; Kadıköy, Istanbul; Turkey
- Coordinates: 40.9787°N 29.0488°E
- Owner: Turkish State Railways
- Operator: Marmaray
- Lines: Istanbul-Ankara railway Feneryolu-Fenerbahçe railway (Abandoned in 1928)
- Platforms: 1 island platform
- Tracks: 3
- Connections: İETT Bus: Istanbul Minibus:

Construction
- Accessible: Yes

History
- Opened: 22 September 1872
- Closed: 2013-18

Services
| Preceding station | TCDD Taşımacılık | Following station |
|---|---|---|
| Söğütlüçeşme towards Halkalı | Marmaray | Göztepe towards Gebze |
Former services
| Preceding station | Turkish State Railways | Following station |
|---|---|---|
| Kızıltoprak towards Haydarpaşa | Haydarpaşa suburban | Göztepe towards Gebze |
Location

Feneryolu railway station (Turkish: Feneryolu istasyonu) is a station on the Marmaray commuter rail line in Kadıköy, Istanbul. It replaced the 145 year old railway station, built by the Ottoman Anatolian Railway.

The original station was opened on 22 September 1872 by the Ottoman Empire and later taken over by the Ottoman Anatolian Railway in 1880. The station was then rebuilt in 1969 to accommodate new commuter trains which served the station until 19 February 2013, when all train service was suspended. The old station (except for the historic station building) was demolished and a new platform was built. Feneryolu opened on 12 March 2019, along with the rest of the Marmaray line.

The station have two tracks with an island platform and one express track on the south side for high-speed and intercity trains.
