= Erenköy railway station =

Railway station in Kadıköy, Istanbul, Turkey

ERENKÖY
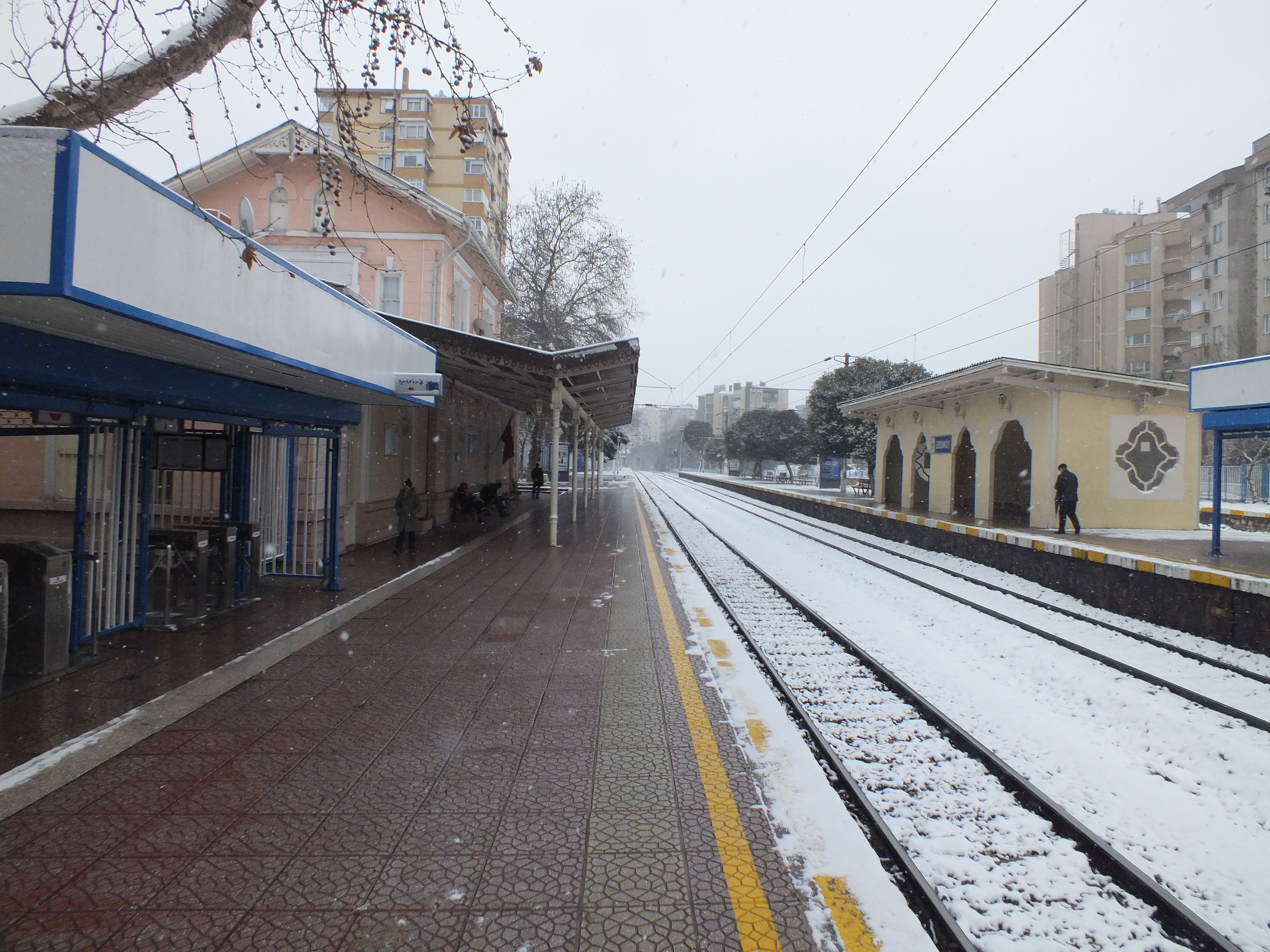
- Looking east on a snowy day.

General information
- Location: Hatboyu Sk. 38, Erenköy Mah. 34738; Kadıköy/Istanbul; Turkey
- Coordinates: 40.9715°N 29.0766°E
- Owner: Turkish State Railways
- Operator: TCDD Taşımacılık
- Line: Istanbul-Ankara railway
- Platforms: 1 island platform
- Tracks: 3

History
- Opened: 22 September 1872
- Closed: 2013-18
- Rebuilt: 1949

Services
Preceding station	TCDD Taşımacılık	Following station
Göztepe towards Halkalı	Marmaray	Suadiye towards Gebze
Former services
Preceding station	Turkish State Railways	Following station
Söğütlüçeşme towards Istanbul	Adapazarı Express	Bostancı towards Adapazarı
Göztepe towards Haydarpaşa	Haydarpaşa suburban	Suadiye towards Gebze
Track layout
Location

Erenköy station (Turkish: Erenköy garı) is a railway station in Kadıköy, Istanbul. Between 1969 and 2013, it was a station on the Haydarpaşa suburban to Gebze and starting on 10 March 2019, a station on the Marmaray commuter rail system.

The station was originally opened on 22 September 1872 by the Ottoman government as part of the railway from Istanbul to İzmit. Erenköy station was expanded in 1949 by the Turkish State Railways to accommodate more traffic.

== Pre-Marmaray station layout ==
Street	Station house	Entrances/Exits
Tracks	Side platform (Platform 1), doors will open on the right
Tracks	Track 1	← Haydarpaşa suburban, Haydarpaşa-Adapazarı Regional toward Haydarpaşa
Tracks	Track 2	Haydarpaşa suburban toward Gebze; Haydarpaşa-Adapazarı Regional toward Adapazarı →
Tracks	Island platform (Platform 2), doors will open on the left or right
Tracks	Track 3	Haydarpaşa suburban toward Gebze; Haydarpaşa-Adapazarı Regional toward Adapazarı →
Tracks	Track 4	No passenger train service
Tracks	Track 5	No passenger train service
Tracks	Side platform (Platform 3), platform not in service
