= Taksim Surp Harutyun Church =

Armenian church in Istanbul, Turkey

Surp Harutyun Church
- Surp Harutyun Kilisesi; Սուրբ Յարութիւն Եկեղեցի
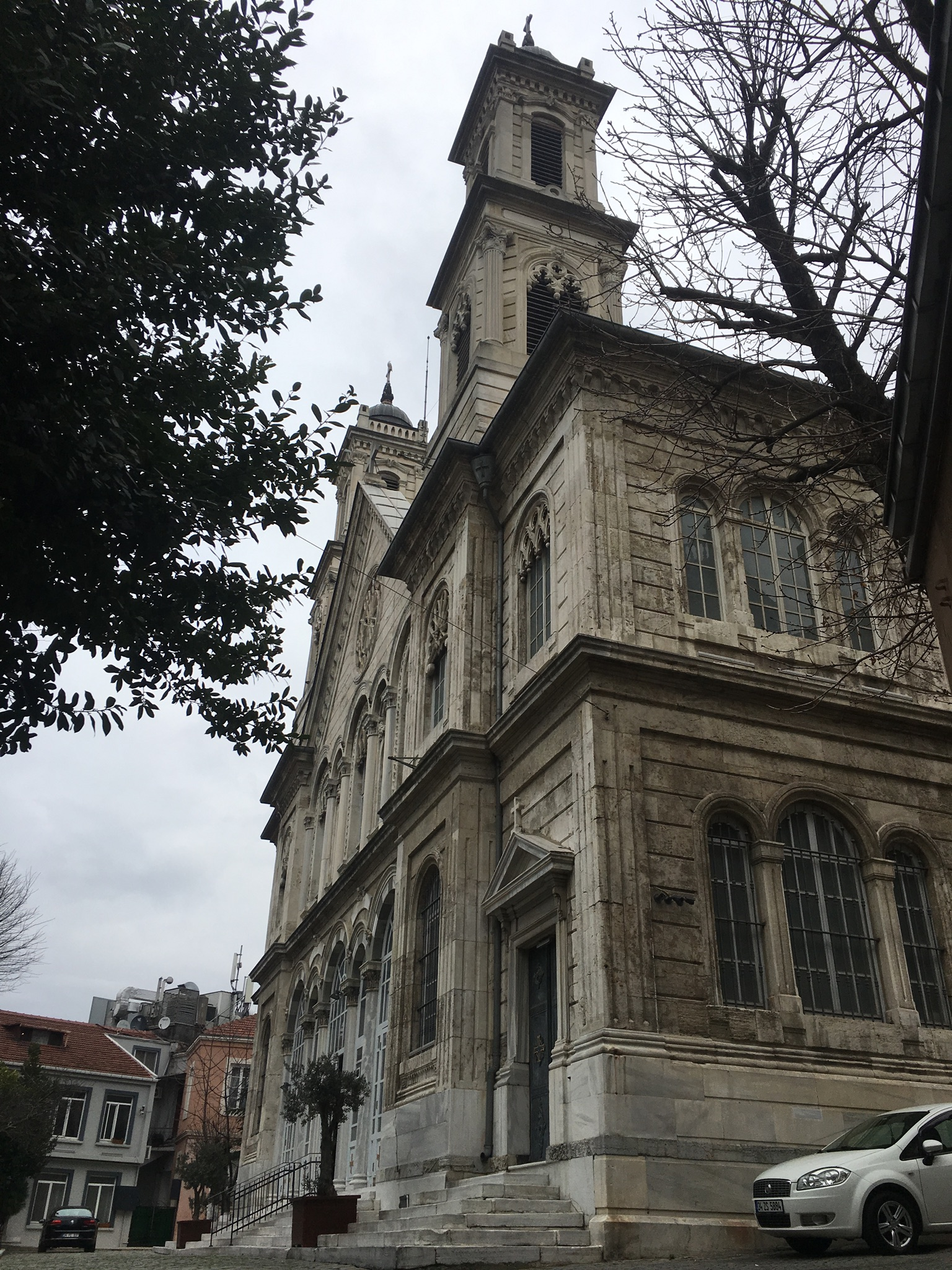

- Shown within Istanbul Beyoğlu

Religion
- Affiliation: Armenian Apostolic Church
- District: Beyoğlu
- Province: Istanbul
- Rite: Armenian Rite

Location
- Country: Turkey
- Coordinates: 41.035057°N 28.984126°E

Architecture
- Architects: Hovhannes and Mıgırdiç Esayan brothers
- Completed: 1895

Taksim Surp Harutyun Church (Armenian: Սուրբ Յարութիւն Եկեղեցի), is an Armenian Church in the Beyoğlu district of Istanbul.

The original date of first construction is not exactly known but the church was removed in 1846, closed down in 1890 and rebuilt in 1895 by the architects Hovhannes and Mıgırdiç Esayan. The number of the Christian church visitors fell after the Armenian Genocide of 1915.
