= Zühtüpaşa =

Coordinates: 40°59′13″N 29°02′19″E

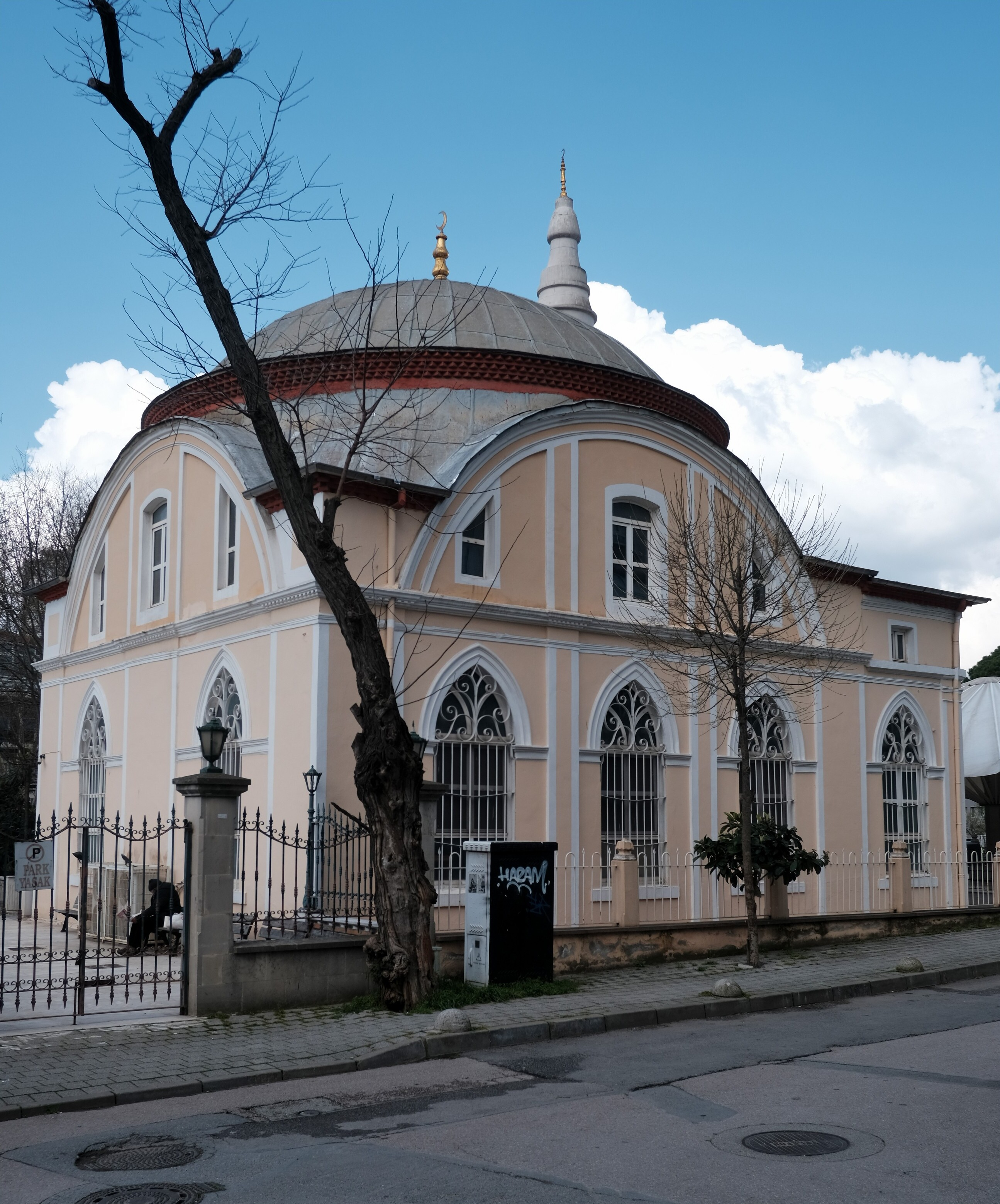
Zühtüpaşa Mosque, Kadıköy, Istanbul

Zühtüpaşa is a neighborhood (mahalle) in the district of Kadıköy, Istanbul, Turkey. Its population is 8155 (2020). Zühtüpaşa is bordered on the north by the Kadıköy neighborhoods of Osmanağa, Hasanpaşa, and Eğitim, on the east by the Kadıköy neighborhoods of Feneryolu and Fenerbahçe, and the south by Fenerbahçe and Kalamış Bay (an inlet of the Sea of Marmara), and on the west by the Kadıköy neighborhoods of Caferağa and Osmanağa. It is often quite crowded because of the sports facilities located there.

== Name ==
After the Ottoman Minister of Finance Ahmet Zühtü Paşa (later Minister of Education) settled in the Kızıltoprak neighborhood of Kadıköy in the 1880s and had a mosque and school built there, the area began to be called by his name.

== Neighborhood institutions ==
- the Ülker Stadium Fenerbahçe Şükrü Saracoğlu Sports Complex, home of the Fenerbahçe Sports Club, with an accompanying museum
- the Kadikoy Municipal Marriage Office
- the Söğütlüçeşme Railway Station

== Historic sites ==
- the Ömer Efendi Open-Air Prayer Area (namazgâh), established in 1772, with a fountain, well, and graveyard
- the Mecidiye Sufi Lodge (dergâh), built by Ayşe Sıdıka Hanım in the late 19th century, demolished at some point, but rebuilt in the 2000s by Ayşe Sıdıka Hanım's grandson
- the Zühtü Paşa Mosque, built by Zühtü Paşa in 1883 or 1884, with a graveyard where the pasha was later buried
- the Zühtü Paşa Primary School, built by Zühtü Paşa in 1889 or 1890, rebuilt in 1980 or 1991 and now used as the Kadıköy Mufti Building (a small graveyard remains beside it)
- the Kuşdili Girls Middle School, built by Zühtü Paşa in 1897 or 1898, now the İbrahim Öktem Kindergarten
- the Hamidiye Boys Middle School, built in 1900, later called the Kenan Evren Anatolian High School, then the İstanbul Anatolian High School, now empty
- the Kızıltoprak Train Station, built in 1929, now the center of the TCDD Retirees Social Assistance Association
