= Suadiye railway station =

Suadiye
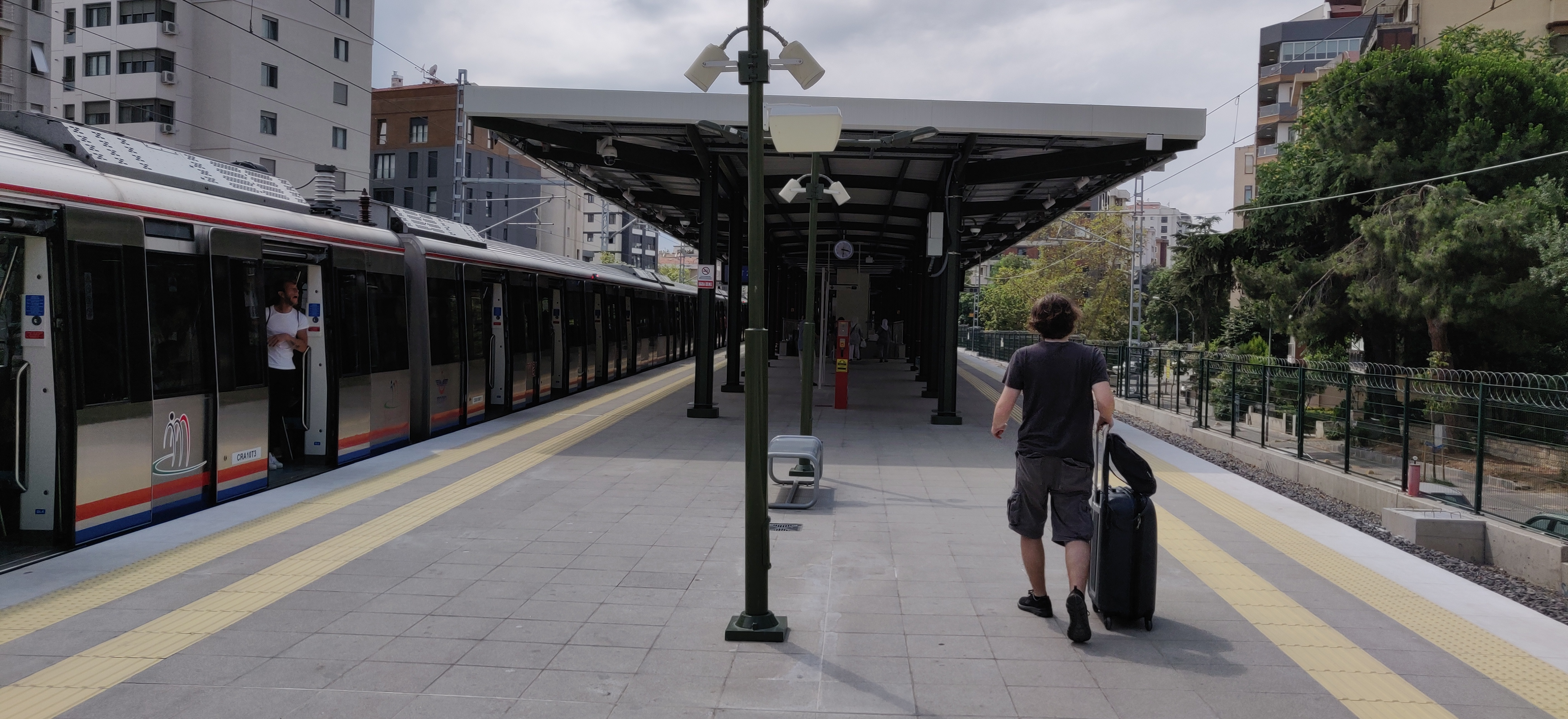

General information
- Location: Ayşeçavuş Cd., Suadiye Mah., 34740; Kadıköy, Istanbul; Turkey
- Coordinates: 40.9607°N 29.0833°E
- Owner: Turkish State Railways
- Operator: TCDD Taşımacılık
- Line: Istanbul-Ankara railway
- Platforms: 1 island platform
- Tracks: 3

Construction
- Structure type: At-grade
- Parking: Located in front of station building.

History
- Opened: 1910
- Closed: 2013-18
- Rebuilt: 2016-18
- Electrified: 1969; 25 kV AC, 50 Hz Overhead wire

Services
Preceding station	TCDD Taşımacılık	Following station
Erenköy towards Halkalı	Marmaray	Bostancı towards Gebze
Former services
Preceding station	Turkish State Railways	Following station
Erenköy towards Haydarpaşa	Haydarpaşa suburban	Bostancı towards Gebze
Track layout
Location

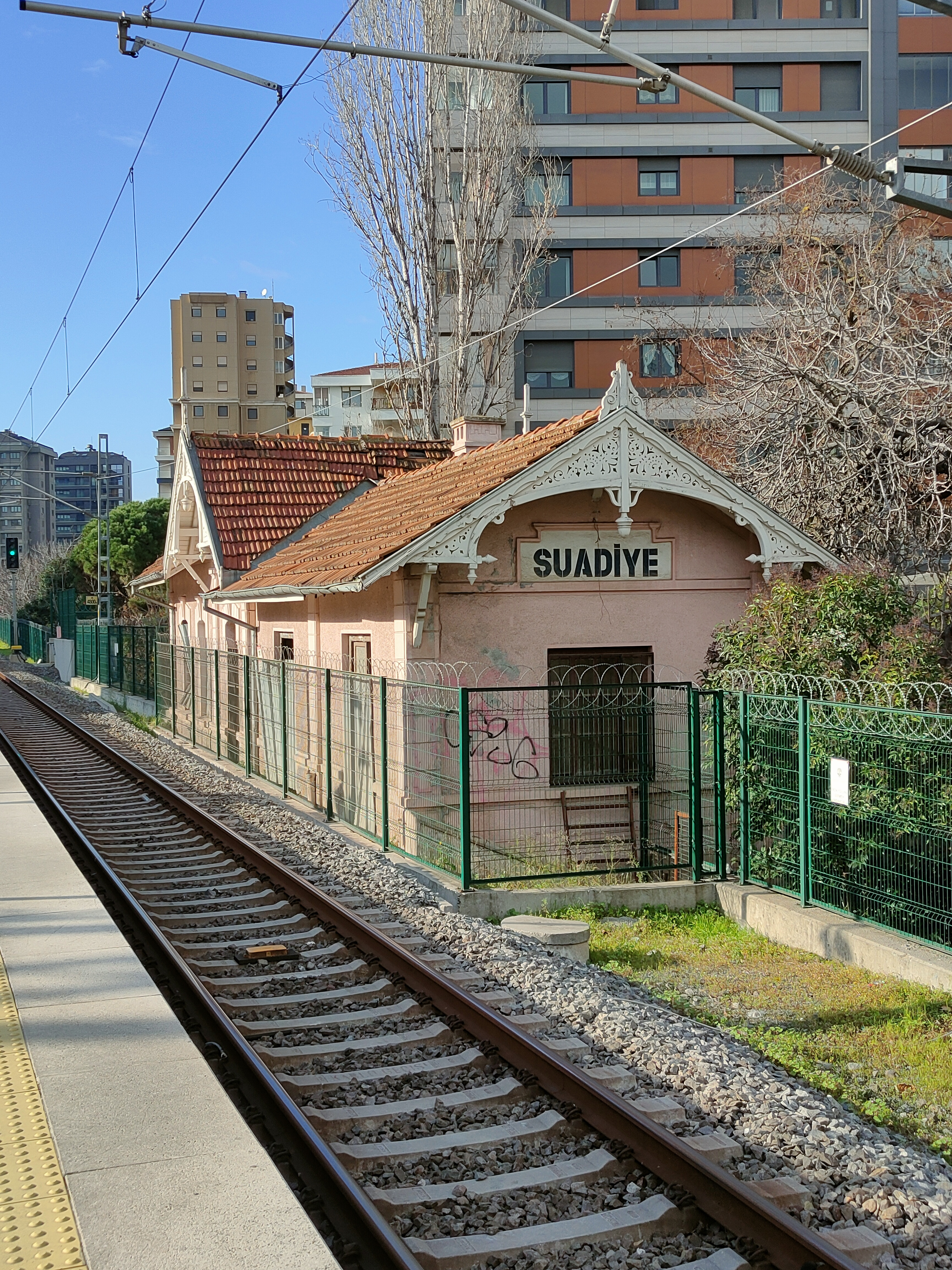
Former station building

Suadiye railway station (Turkish: Suadiye istasyonu) is a station on the Marmaray cross-city rail service in the mostly residential neighbourhood of Suadiye in Kadıköy, Istanbul.

The old station was a stop on the Haydarpaşa suburban commuter line from 1951 to 2013. It was built in 1910 by the Ottoman Anatolian Railway (CFOA), as the neighbourhood began to expand in the late 1900s and still survives alongside the new replacement station.

The new station opened, belatedly, for service in 2019.
