= Surp Takavor Church =

Armenian church in Istanbul, Turkey

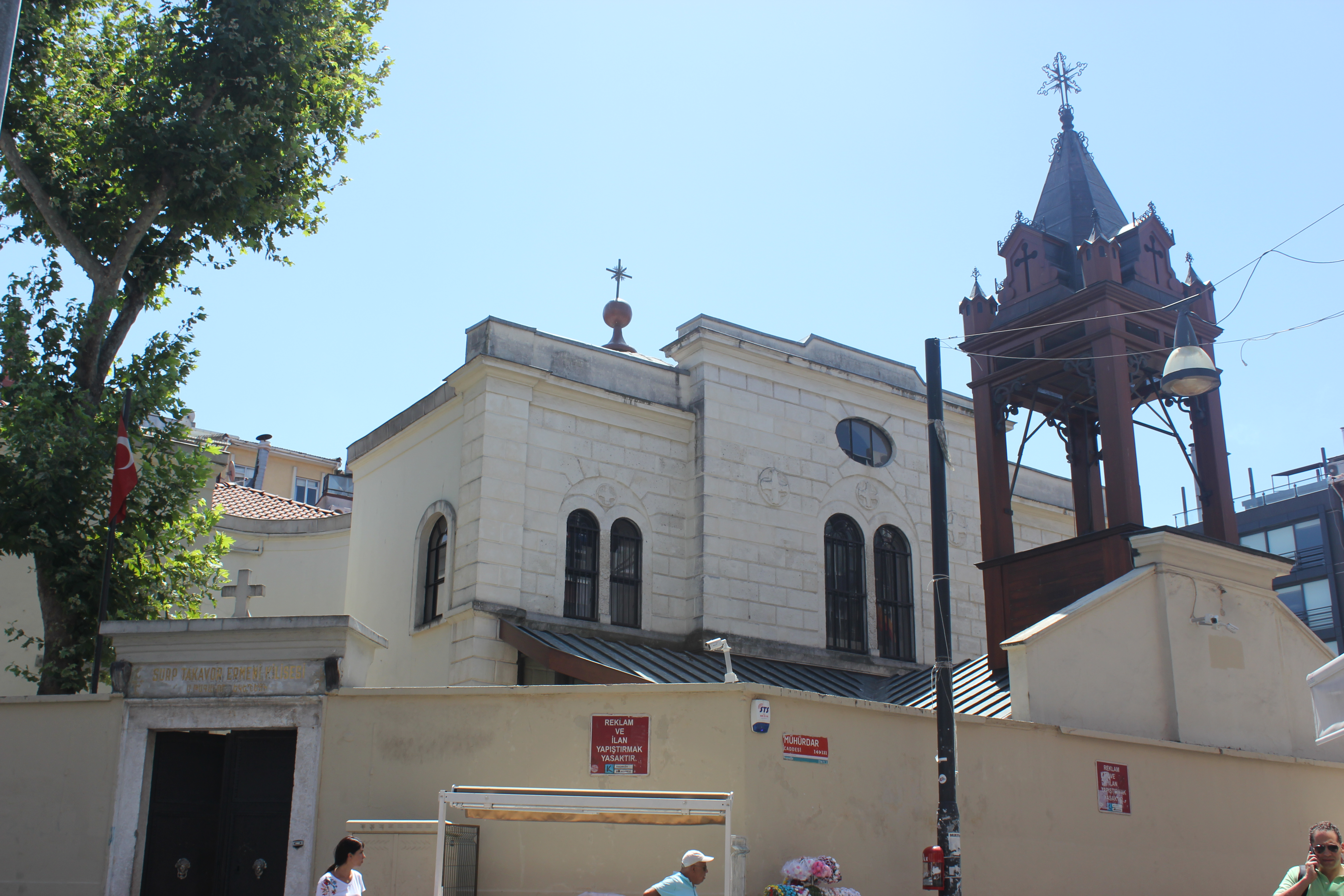

Religion
- Affiliation: Armenian Apostolic Church

Location
- Location: Kadıköy, Istanbul, Turkey
- Interactive map of Surp Takavor Church
- Coordinates: 40°59′24″N 29°01′28″E

Architecture
- Type: Church
- Style: Armenian architecture, Ottoman architecture

Surp Takavor Church (Armenian: Սուրբ Թագաւոր Եկեղեցի; Turkish: Surp Takavor Kilisesi) is an Armenian Apostolic church in the Kadıköy district of Istanbul, Turkey.

It is thought to have been first built in the 17th century, but the earliest mention of the church is from 1722. Its reconstruction was financed by Harutyun Amira Nordukyan (1770–1843). It was reopened on 4 July 1814. It was again damaged by an earthquake 26 years later and repaired by Erzurumlu Haji Garabet Agha Muradyan, reopening on 30 September 1858.
