= Osmanağa =

Neighborhood in Istanbul, Turkiye

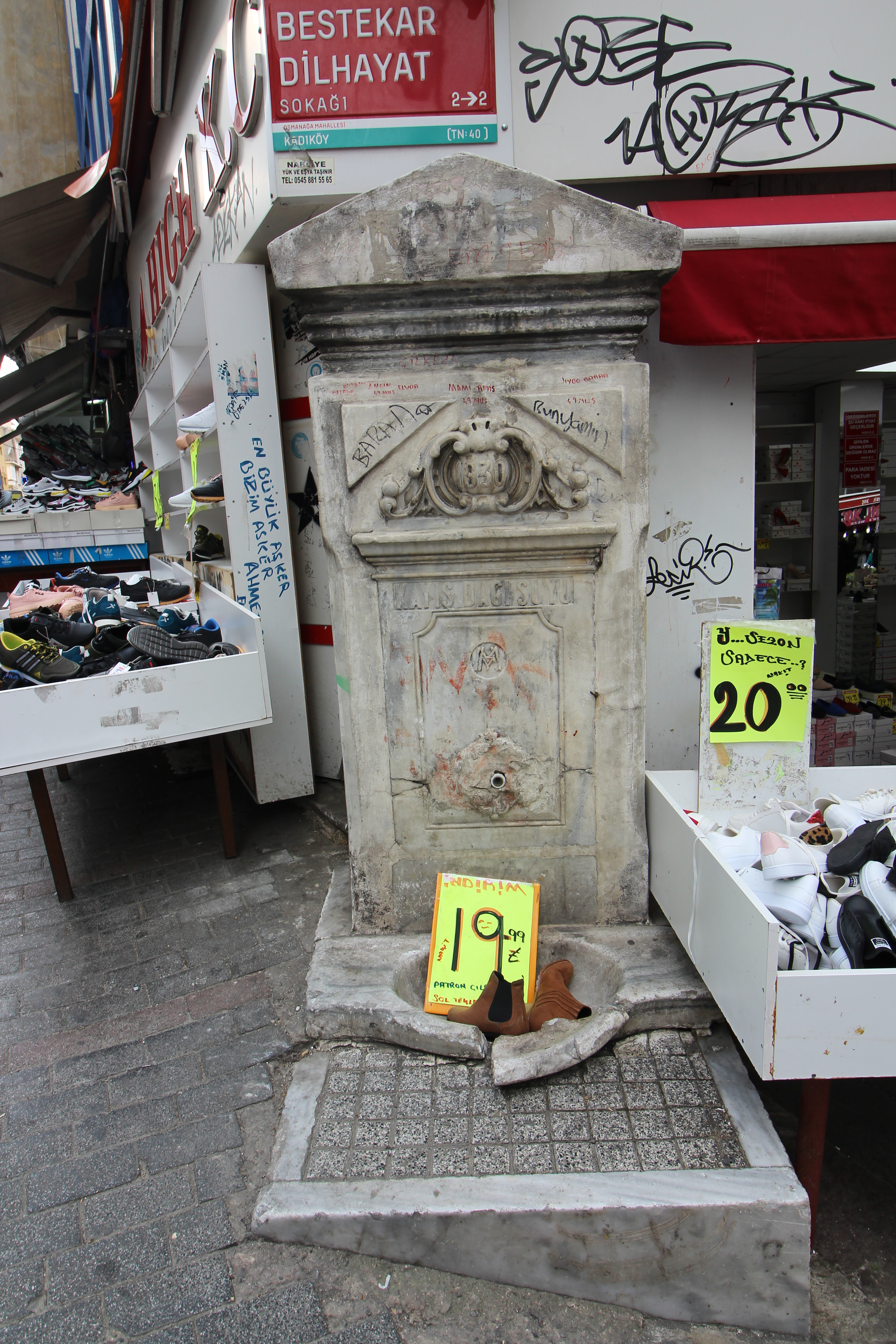
fountain, Osmanağa, Kadıköy, Istanbul

Osmanağa is a neighborhood (mahalle) in the district of Kadıköy, Istanbul, Turkey. The neighborhood's population is 7728 (2020). Osmanağa is one of the central neighborhoods of Kadıköy, located at the intersection of important land and sea transportation networks. It is an area of intense commercial activity, with a much higher number of places of business (9347) than residences (5374). It also hosts a large number of voluntary associations.

The neighborhood is bordered on the north by the Kadıköy neighborhoods of Rasimpaşa and Hasanpaşa, on the east by the Kadıköy neighborhood of Zühtüpaşa, on the south by the Kadıköy neighborhood of Caferağa, and on the west by Caferağa and Kadıköy Bay, a part of the Bosporus.

== Historic sites ==
- the Osmanağa Mosque, first built in 1612 by Bâbüssaâde ağası Mısırlı Osman Ağa, heavily restored in 1812 by Mahmud II, and rebuilt after burning down in 1878
- the St. Euphemia Greek Orthodox Church, built in 1694 on the ruins of a monastery dedicated to a Saint Vassi, heavily restored and enlarged in 1830, restored again in 1993
- the bull statue, created in 1864, installed at Altıyol, Kadıköy, in 1987
- the Immaculate Conception School, an Armenian Catholic school built in 1902, now the Nâzım Hikmet Culture Center
- the Süreyya Opera House, built in 1924-1927 by Süreyya Paşa
