= Caddebostan =

Neighborhood in Istanbul, Turkey

- Settlement
- View of CKM from Bağdat Avenue

- Location within Turkey Location within Istanbul
- Coordinates: 40.9670186°N 29.0629255°E
- Country: Turkey
- Province: İstanbul
- District: Kadıköy
- Area: 1.663 km^{2} (0.642 sq mi)
- Population (2025): 20,234
  - Density: 12,170/km^{2} (31,510/sq mi)
- Time zone: UTC+3 (TRT)
- Postal code: 34728

Caddebostan is a neighborhood in the Kadıköy district, on the Asian side of Istanbul, Turkey. It has a population of 20,234 (2025). Caddebostan is bordered by the neighborhoods of Fenerbahçe in the west, Göztepe and Erenköy in the north, and Suadiye in the east. It is a generally flat neighbourhood with a shoreline to the Marmara Sea. Present-day Caddebostan roughly corresponds to the ancient Byzantine town of Rouphinianai.

Originally a summer resort area with gardens, mansions, and a ferry pier, Caddebostan is now an affluent residential and commercial neighborhood with mostly midrise buildings. It is known for Bağdat Avenue, one of Istanbul’s major shopping and dining streets. The Caddebostan Coast is a popular waterfront promenade and includes a dedicated bicycle lane, which is relatively uncommon in the city. Compared with many other parts of Istanbul, Caddebostan has a higher level of walkability and more green space. Several bus lines pass through the neighbourhood, and a metro station is under construction.

== History ==
=== Byzantine period ===
The early history of Drys is uncertain. It was probably a minor fishing village on the Marmara shore, on wooded land near the capital that developed over time. Its name means "oak" in Greek, and it is linked to a notable oak tree. Another argument is that it is an Anatolian name (Adra/Odra) that was Hellenized. The settlement may date to the reign of Theodosius I (379–395). It certainly existed by the early 5th century, when it hosted the anti-Chrysostom Synod of the Oak of 403, attended by thirty-nine bishops under Theophilus of Alexandria.

The place took its name from Flavius Rufinus, praetorian prefect under the young Arcadius. Rufinus came from a poor Gascon family and rose rapidly to become magister officiorum (388–392), consul (392) and chief commander (394). He is described as a persecutor of Arians who amassed wealth by confiscation, and with it built a villa, a church and a monastery. Rufinus was killed by mercenaries in Constantinople on 27 November 395. Arcadius confiscated his estate, and the villa became an imperial residence known as "Basileia".

Ruphinianus flourished through continuous imperial summer use and secure trade. Arcadius's daughters Pulcheria, Arcadia and Maria stayed there in 444–448. Theodosius II visited periodically. In the 6th century, the site lost its imperial status. The estate passed to Belisarius, and his wife Antonina reportedly lured John of Cappadocia there to incriminate him.

In the 7th and 8th centuries, Persian forces under Khosrow II reached Chalcedon in 605 and probably used the villa as a camp, damaging it. Further sieges followed in 626–629, 674 and 716–717. During the last, Maslama's fleet of 1,800 ships dispersed into harbours on the northern Marmara coast, probably including Ruphinianus. The residents likely fled, and the buildings were left ruined. The settlement then probably reverted to a fishing village.

After the 10th century, Constantine VII Porphyrogennetos demolished the decayed villa and built a larger summer palace. He also restored the monastery, as did Patriarch Theophylaktos in 950. In spring 1078, Nikephoros III Botaneiates stayed at the palace with his troops while preparing his march on the capital. This is the last major use of the site.

The Fourth Crusade (1203–1204) left extramural settlements unprotected and abandoned, ending in the place disappearing from the record in the mid-13th century. Turkish raids in Bithynia, the defeat at Pelekanon (1329), and the peace talks at nearby Merdivenköy led Byzantium to cede the Asian suburbs to the Ottomans, and they fell into ruin. According to Gyllius, who was in Istanbul in 1544–1550, the surviving palace remains were demolished and the stone was shipped across the Bosphorus for the Süleymaniye Complex.

=== Ottoman and Republic periods ===
The general Kadıköy-Bostancı area was composed of agricultural land. They were famous for bostans (cultivated open fields). It is stated that the fruits and vegetables from this region are "delicious" due to the composition of the soil. It was only after the development of the Anatolian Railways in 1872 that these agricultural lands started to transform into settlements. These settlements can be referred to as sayfiye, meaning an area mostly used in the summer. Upper-class Muslims, non-Muslims and foreigners started moving their houses to the area. It is said that every mansion had bağs (orchards) inside its garden around Caddebostan. The Caddebostan pier also contributed to the suburbanization and increasing connectivity to the rest of the city.

Among the many mansions built around this time period, perhaps the most prominent one, the Ragıp Pasha Mansion in Caddebostan was designed by Prussian architect August Jasmund along with the nearby Tevhide Hanım Mansion belonging to Ragıp Pasha's daughter Tevhide Hanım, both in 1906.

Caddebostan was referred to as Cadıbostanı ("Witch Garden"), as outlaws commonly hid in the neighborhood. It is said that this area could not be visited even during the day. In the Republic era of Turkey, when the neighborhood became more developed the name was changed to Caddebostan, which literally means "Avenue garden". In 1930, a separate neighborhood unit was created for Caddebostan, detaching it from Erenköy and Göztepe.

The old Maksim Gazinosu, now a supermarket on Sahilyolu

On the Caddebostan coast, there were two sea hamams, one for men and one for women. The first beach was opened in 1926 and the sand was brought from Marmara Ereğlisi. The second beach, with a restaurant, was opened in 1928. The neighborhood became a place for entertainment with many nightclubs and venues opening in the 1940s. The largest in the quarter was Caddebostan Maksim Gazinosu (the Caddebostan branch of the original Maksim Gazinosu in Beyoğlu), where famous Turkish singers used to perform live until 1996. After it was closed, its building, which has retained its exterior appearance, was internally restructured to become the present-day Caddebostan MMM Migros supermarket.

Since the 1950s, the Jewish population residing in the Yeldeğirmeni quarter of Kadıköy spent their summers at Caddebostan and Suadiye. To accommodate this, the Caddebostan Synagogue was built in 1954.

Onward from the 1960s, the areas around Bağdat Avenue started to urbanize rapidly. As demand for housing between Kadıköy and Bostancı grew, more residential areas were needed. In 1972, a 1/5000-scale Erenköy-Bostancı Zoning Plan was drawn up, which allowed denser building between Kızıltoprak and Bostancı. Under the plan, buildings of up to four storeys were permitted on the coast and up to five storeys on Bağdat Avenue. After the Bosphorus Bridge opened in 1973, the area became an attractive place to live. It was seen as peaceful, close to the sea and easy to reach, and it appealed to upper and middle income groups. In 1985, the Caddebostan coast was filled and transformed into a coastal promenade accessible by the public, which further increased the quarter's popularity; though this led to the closure of the Caddebostan ferry pier. Many private homes which were previously on the shoreline, such as the Ragıp Pasha Mansion and the neighboring seaside mansions, as well as private membership clubs such as Büyük Kulüp and Marmara Yelken Kulübü, lost their direct access to the Sea of Marmara.

The Sahilyolu (Coastal Road), a scenic road that runs along the Marmara coast, parallel to Bağdat Avenue and facing the Princes' Islands, was also built in the latter half of the 1980s with further coastal land reclamation. The part between Caddebostan and Bostancı was named as Çetin Emeç Bulvarı, while the part between Bostancı and Pendik was named as Turgut Özal Bulvarı. Traffic on Bağdat Avenue, which used to run in both directions until the latter half of the 1980s, started to run in a single direction (towards the west) after the completion of the Sahilyolu, which runs towards the east and serves much of the eastward traffic that previously flowed along Bağdat Avenue.

Urban regeneration projects spread to every street in the 2010s. In this context, many older buildings were demolished to make way for modern, earthquake-resilient buildings (often with more storeys). Nowadays, the area hosts mostly high income residents, along with many venues. The neighbourhood receives a large quantity of visitors from other districts of Istanbul. Especially in recent years, Caddebostan and the surrounding area has received a great amount of popularity for its coastal location and its high commercial and socioeconomic development which led to the real estate prices increasing significantly.

== Geography ==
Caddebostan and surroundings on OSM

Caddebostan is about 5km east of central Kadıköy. It is one of the 21 official neighbourhoods of Kadıköy district, with Nihal Cengiz as the muhtar. It is located right on the shore of the Marmara Sea looking southwest at the Anatolian part of Istanbul. The entire promenade on the coast was filled in. The nearest two rivers are Kurbağalıdere in Yoğurtçu Park and Çamaşırcıdere in Bostancı. Following the official boundaries of Caddebostan, it covers an area of approximately 1.663 km².

=== Geology and climate ===
In Caddebostan, the summer months are hot and have little rainfall, while the winter months are mild and rainy. The climate is under the influence of the Sea of Marmara. As in all other coastal districts of Istanbul, differences in temperature and humidity are felt in Caddebostan due to its proximity to the coast and the openness of the terrain. The natural environmental characteristics of the general area is composed almost entirely of Paleozoic and Cenozoic rocks of Istanbul. It is located near the North Anatolian Fault, and subject to level 1 and 2 earthquake region regulations of Turkey.

=== Composition ===
The official neighbourhood boundaries often differ from colloquial quarters (called semt in Turkish). For example, Çiftehavuzlar is not an official neighbourhood, but it encompasses an area between Fenerbahçe and Caddebostan. Similarly, Şaşkınbakkal is between Caddebostan and Suadiye, known as one of the most active parts of Bağdat Avenue with major brands located here such as Apple and Sephora. On top of informal quarters, the areas of the official neighbourhoods often also lead to confusion. The Göztepe Park, despite being named as such, is actually located within the Caddebostan boundaries instead of Göztepe. The section which is familiarly called Caddebostan is around Plajyolu Street and İskele Street.

=== Statistics ===
The total population of 20,234 consists of 10,016 men and 10,218 women. The population saw its peak at 2011 (21,622) and its lowest point at 2017 (18,316). An increase was seen from 2017 to 2021, followed by a small decrease.

A research published by Marmara Municipalities Union in 2026 put Caddebostan at 4th place for quality of life among 745 Istanbul neighbourhoods. Another research, by REIDIN in 2025, placed Caddebostan as the 4th most socioeconomically developed neighbourhood in all of Turkey.

== Infrastructure ==
Galib Pasha Mosque

CKM, or Caddebostan Kültür Merkezi (Caddebostan Cultural Center) is located in the Caddebostan quarter. It includes a theater hall, 8 movie theaters, and other facilities such as a gym, a bookshop, a library and a bar.

In terms of religious structures, there are two mosques in the neighbourhood; Galib Pasha Mosque which is historical and the Mihrimah Sultan Mosque, both located directly on Bağdat Avenue and closer to Erenköy. The Caddebostan Synagogue is also located around the neighborhood.

The main building of the Istanbul Provincial Directorate of Agriculture and Forestry is located within Caddebostan, on Bağdat Avenue.

=== Education ===
While Caddebostan is a small neighborhood in terms of size, it has many schools, both public and private, such as:

- 50. Yıl Tahran Anadolu High School
- 50. Yıl Cumhuriyet Feridun Tümer Anadolu High School
- Mehmet Sait Aydoslu Middle School
- Erenköy Primary School
- Private İSTEK Schools
- Private Irmak Schools

=== Transportation ===
Many bus and dolmuş lines reaching Pendik and Kadıköy serve Caddebostan through Bağdat Avenue and Cemil Topuzlu Boulevard. As for rail transport, the nearest stations are Feneryolu, Göztepe, and Erenköy, but a metro station is under construction, namely the 60. Yıl Parkı station of the M12 line which will be located in Göztepe Park.

== Attractions ==
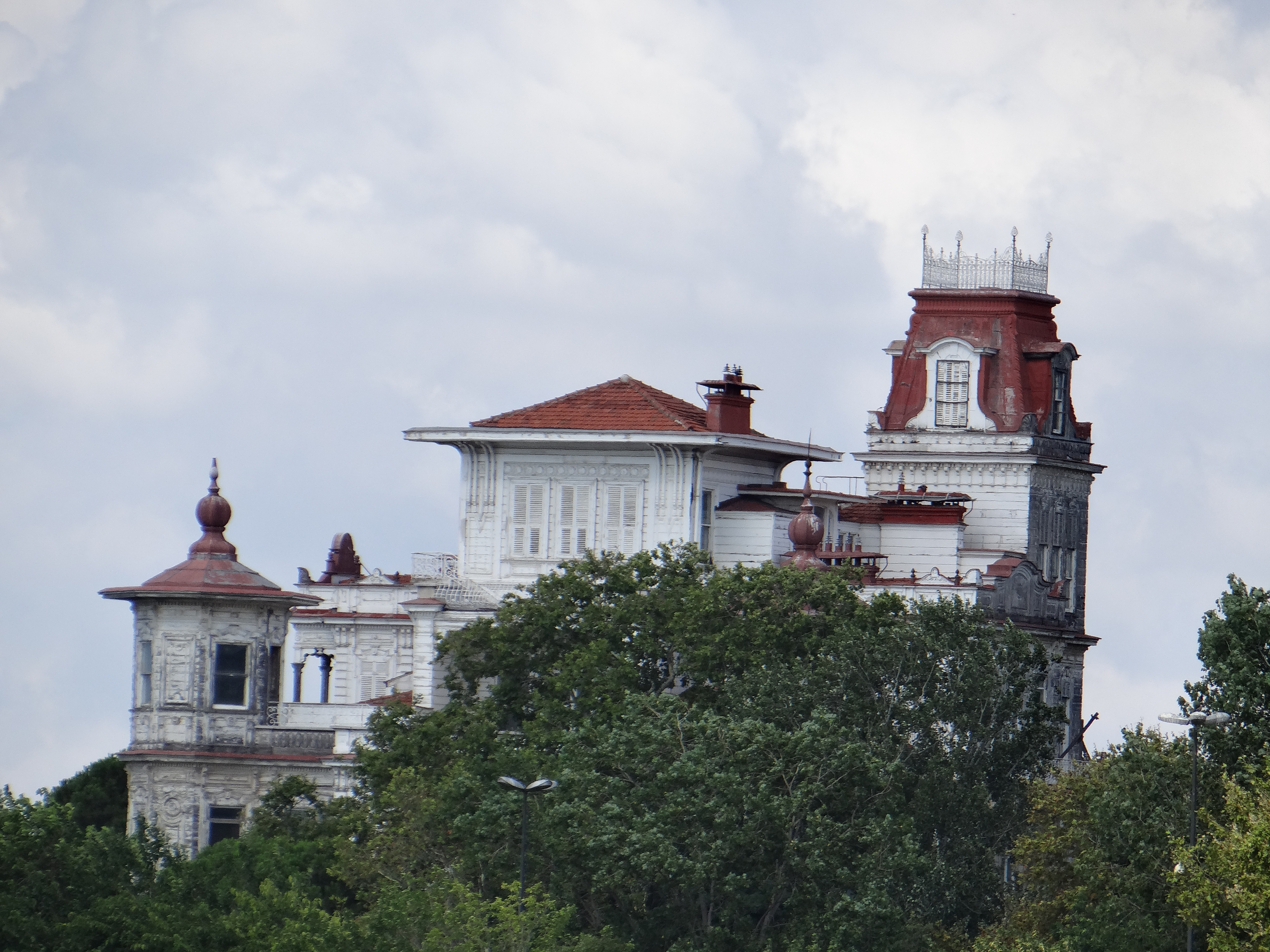
Ragıp Pasha Mansion

Caddebostan is popular for its coastal promenade, where walking, running, and cycling are very common. Events are frequently organized on the coast, such as the Red Bull Flugtag (Red Bull Uçuş Günü) sponsored by Red Bull. The Caddebostan Coast also includes the three Caddebostan Beaches. The coast houses the Dalyan Park which contains facilities such as playgrounds and sport related installments. There are basketball fields connected to famous players, namely Kobe Bryant and Shane Larkin, which often have tournaments within. Swimming is possible in Caddebostan beaches which is seen rarely in Istanbul. In the summer, the beaches get very crowded.

There are many old mansions on the coast, the most significant one being the Ragıp Pasha Mansion, also referred to as the Perili Köşk (literally "Mansion with Fairies", which means "Haunted Mansion" in Turkish). The mansion is registered as a historical landmark of Caddebostan and Istanbul. Other famous mansions in Caddebostan include the Tevhide Hanım Mansion (Tevhide Hanım Köşkü), Theron Damon Mansion (Theron Damon Köşkü), and Cemil Topuzlu Mansion (Cemil Topuzlu Köşkü).

=== Bağdat Avenue ===
One of the busiest sections of Bağdat Avenue is located in Caddebostan. The shops of numerous luxury brands, as well as restaurants, cafés and pubs, are located in this quarter. The entire avenue is 14 kilometers long, spanning from Maltepe in the east to Kadıköy in the west. There is often a lot of traffic and the avenue is usually crowded. It is the main shopping area of the neighborhood.

=== Bars Street ===
Along with Bağdat Avenue, another important street in Caddebostan is İskele Street, colloquially referred to as Barlar Sokağı ("Bars Street") due to the numerous bars, pubs and cafés located there. At night, İskele Street is very active, and on some crowded evenings, especially during Istanbul derbies between Galatasaray, Fenerbahçe or Beşiktaş, quarrels, fights and other incidents have occurred.

Göztepe 60. Year Park

=== Göztepe 60. Year Park ===
The Göztepe 60. Year Park stretches from Bağdat Avenue to the coast between Göztepe and Caddebostan. The park is popular since it covers a large area and includes many functionalities such as tulip gardens, walking areas, playgrounds and exercise areas. In 2024, a museum about Kemal Sunal was opened within the park. Currently, the 60. Yıl Parkı metro station is planned to open at the end of 2026, and is being built directly under the park.

== Gallery ==
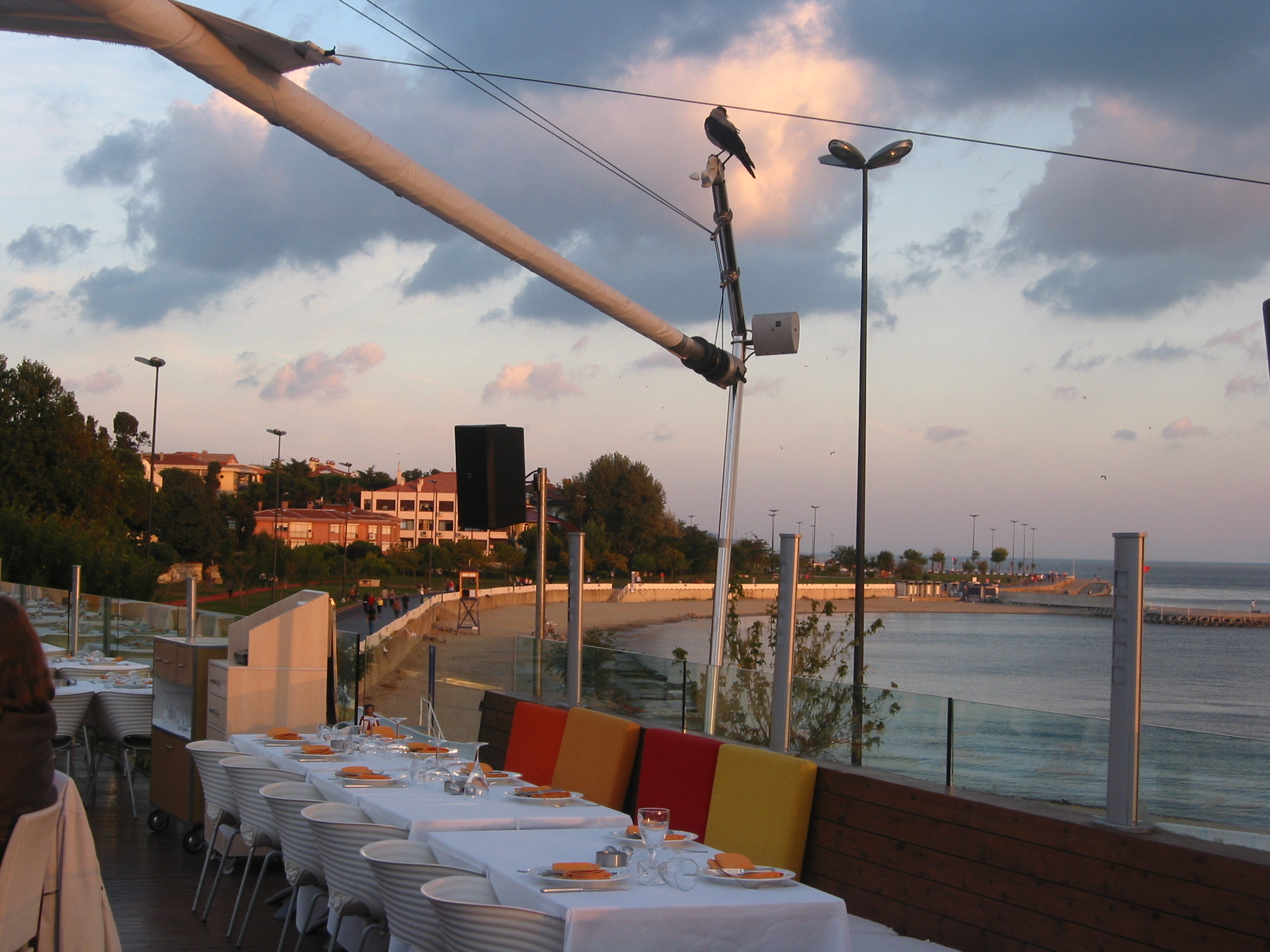
Caddebostan Beach viewed from Büyük Kulüp

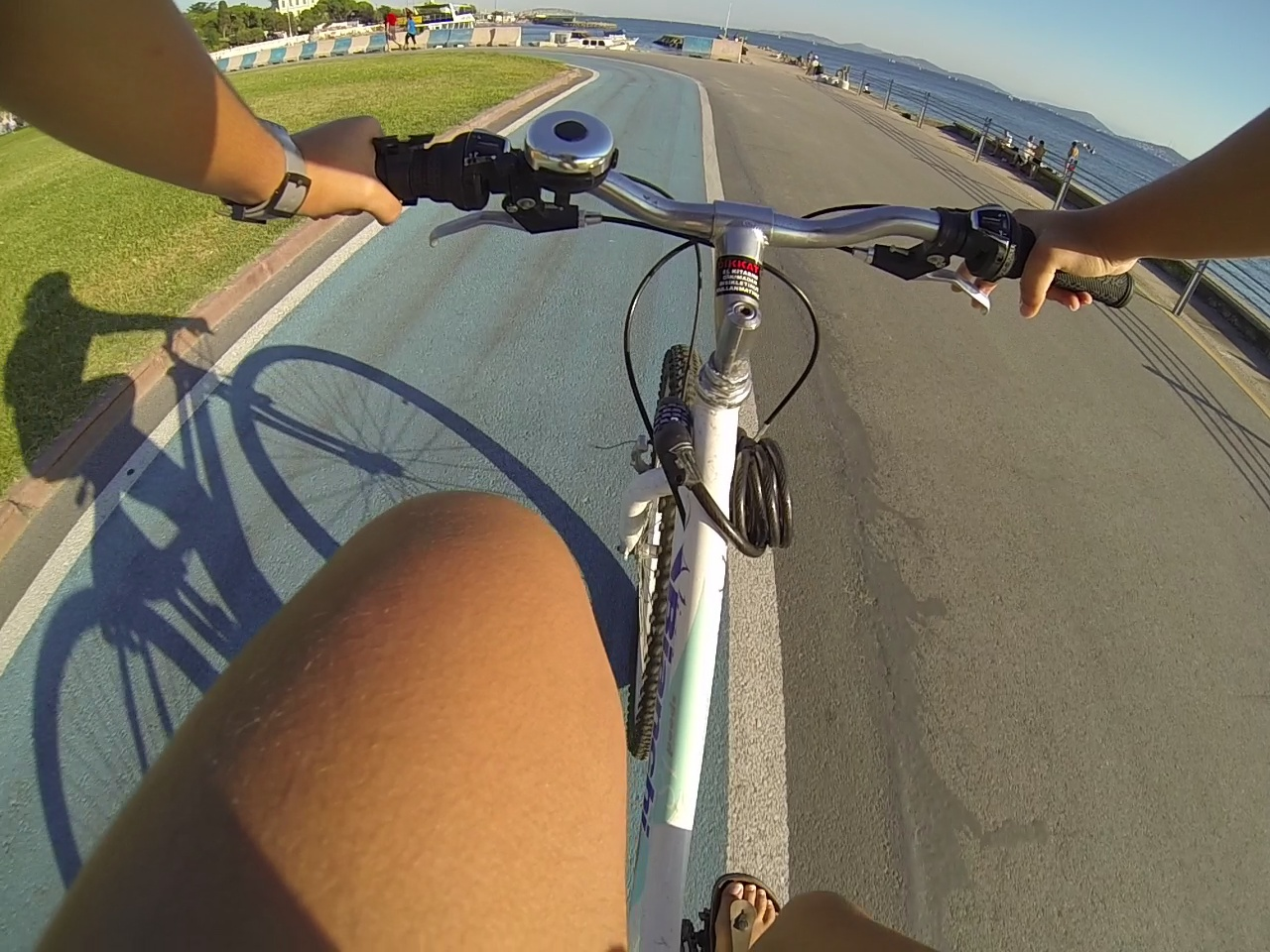
The bicycle road along the coastal promenade of Caddebostan, with the Princes' Islands visible at right

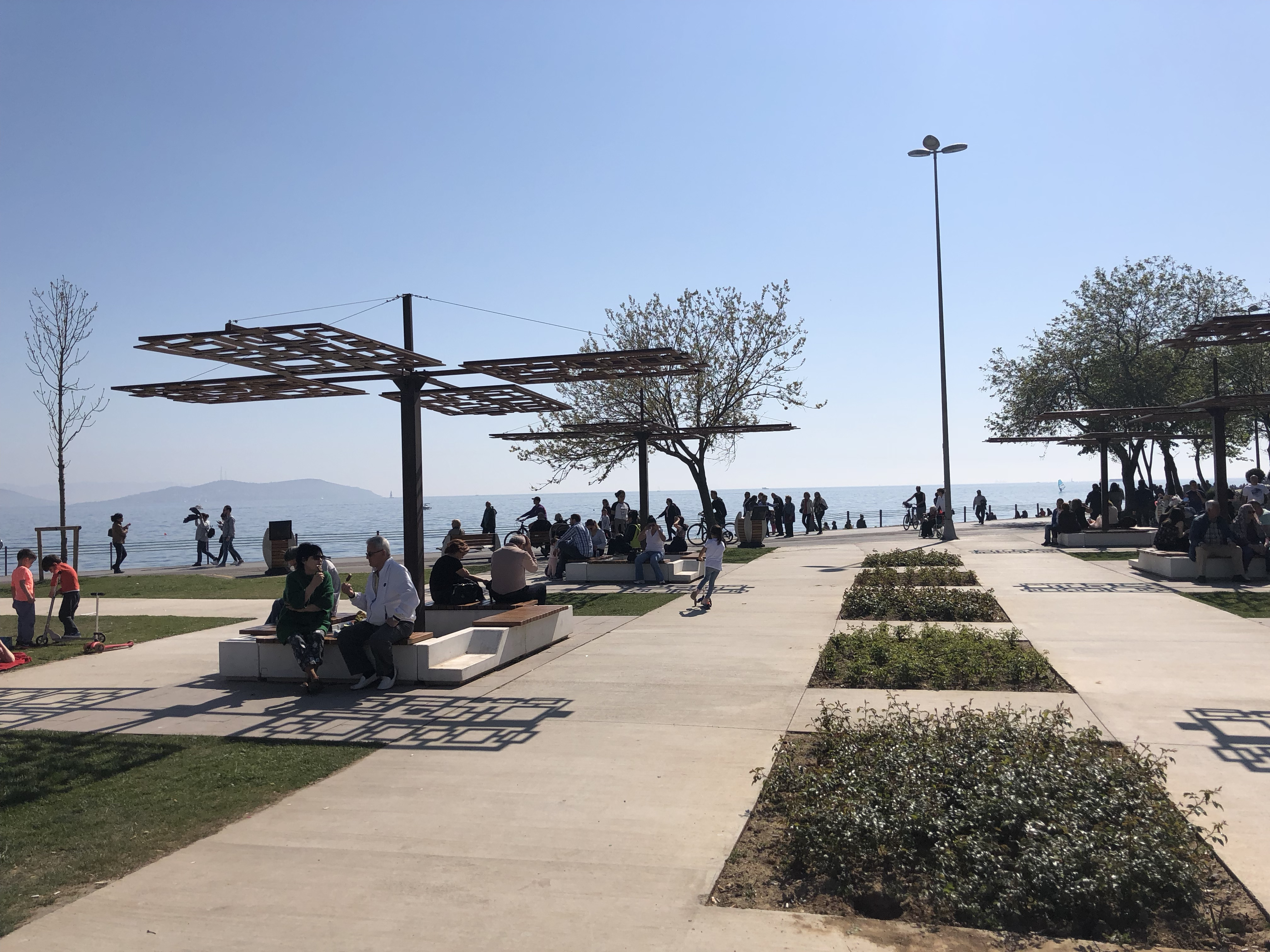
Caddebostan Coastal Park, with Kınalıada Island at left

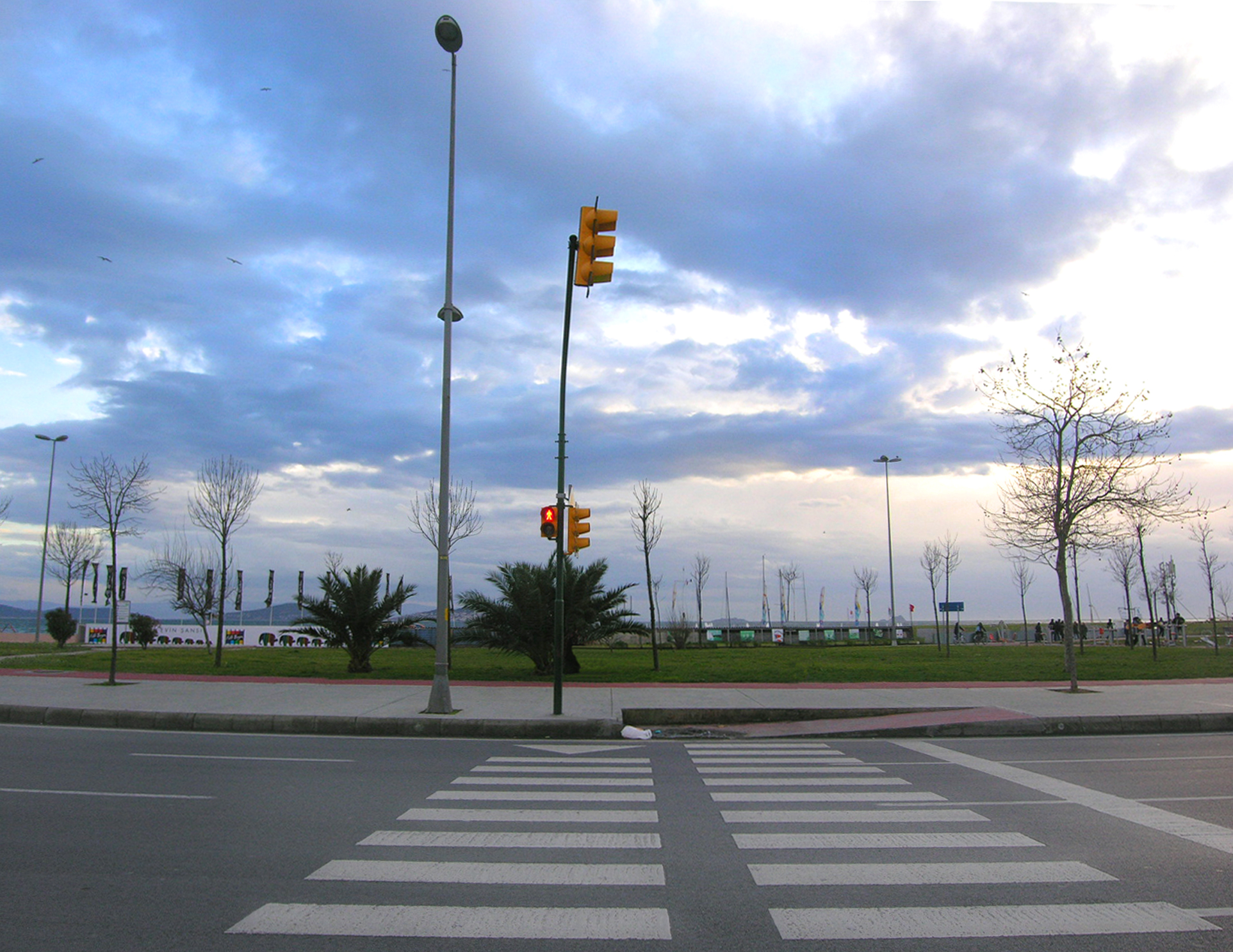
Çetin Emeç Boulevard along the Marmara coast, with the Princes' Islands on the horizon
