= 60. Yıl Parkı station =

Metro station under construction in Istanbul

60. Yıl Parkı
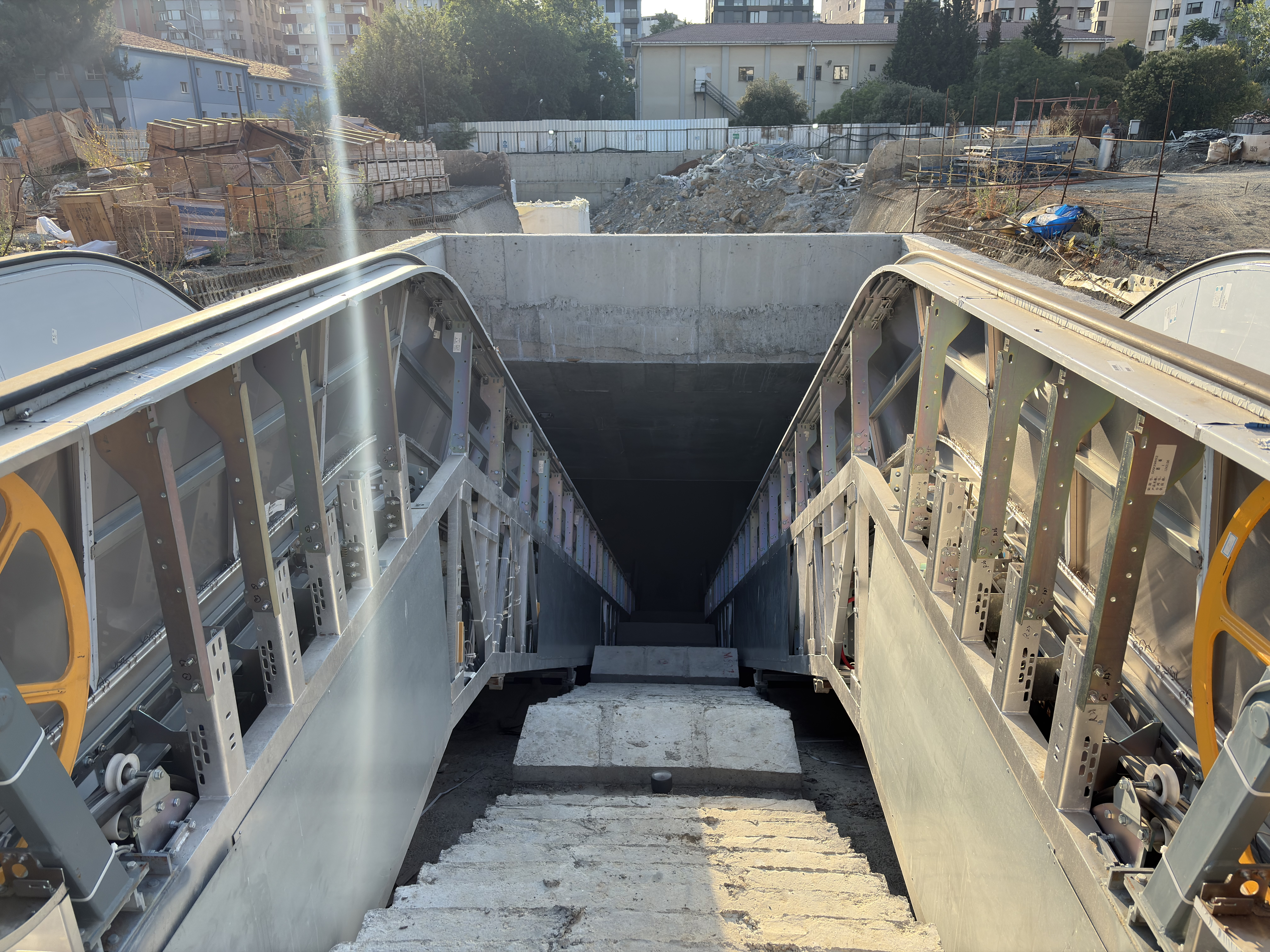
- Entrance to the station

General information
- Location: Kavaklı Street, Göztepe Park, Caddebostan; Kadıköy, Istanbul; Turkey
- Coordinates: 40°58′11″N 29°03′25″E
- System: Istanbul Metro rapid transit station
- Owner: Istanbul Metropolitan Municipality
- Operator: Metro Istanbul
- Line: M12
- Platforms: 1 island platform
- Tracks: 2
- Connections: İETT Bus: 16D, 16, 4, GZ1, GZ2, ER1, ER2

Construction
- Structure type: Underground
- Parking: No
- Cycle facilities: Yes
- Accessible: Yes

History
- Opening: 19 December 2026 (2 months' time)

Services
Preceding station	Istanbul Metro	Following station
Terminus	M12 Line (under construction)	Tütüncü Mehmet Efendi towards Kazım Karabekir
Location

60. Yıl Parkı (60th Year Park) is an underground metro station under construction, and the southern terminus of the M12 line of the Istanbul Metro. It is planned to enter service on 19 December 2026. The station, located under the Göztepe 60. Year Park in the Caddebostan neighbourhood of Kadıköy, will have 2 entrances.

== Surrounding area ==
- Göztepe 60th Year Park
- Bağdat Avenue
- Caddebostan
- Göztepe
- Çiftehavuzlar
- Caddebostan Coast
- Caddebostan Beach 2
- Kemal Sunal Museum
- İSTEK Schools
- Büyük Kulüp
