= Suadiye, Kadıköy =

Neighborhood in Istanbul, Turkey

Suadiye
- Neighbourhood
- Suadiye inside Kadıköy

- Location within Turkey Location within Istanbul
- Coordinates: 40.96111°N 29.08139°E
- Country: Turkey
- Province: İstanbul
- District: Kadıköy
- Area: 1.5 km^{2} (0.58 sq mi)
- Population (2023): 26,428
  - Density: 18,000/km^{2} (46,000/sq mi)
- Time zone: UTC+3 (TRT)
- Postal code: 34740

Suadiye is a neighborhood in the Kadıköy district of Istanbul, Turkey with a population of 26,428 (2023). It is known for its European-esque restaurants and cafes and location near the coast and luxurious lifestyle, in relation with the rest of the Bağdat Avenue area. The neighbourhood is bordered by Caddebostan and Erenköy in the west, Bostancı in the east, Kozyatağı and 19 Mayıs in the north, and the Sea of Marmara in the south. As of 2024, its muhtar is the Turkish folk musician Hilal Özdemir.

Suadiye has a station on the Marmaray (B1) railway line, the Suadiye railway station.

== History ==
In the 1700s, the area between Bostancı and Göztepe was known for smugglers and thieves. The land was used for vineyards, gardens, and pig raising and thus was called Domuzdamı (from Turkish domuz, "pig," and dam, "shed").

In 1900, Finance Minister Ahmed Reşad Paşa built a mansion in the area on land given by the sultan. In 1907, the Suadiye Mosque was built on this land by Commissioner Said Bey of the Ottoman Public Debt Administration, in memory of his wife Suad Hanım, the daughter of Reşad Paşa. The mosque then gave its name to the area around it.

Train service had begun in the 1870s between Haydarpaşa and Pendik, but this had little effect on the neighborhood until 1910, when the Suadiye Train Station was opened. Then upper-class families began building mansions and summer houses in Suadiye. In the 1920s, beaches became popular in Istanbul, including the Suadiye shore of the Marmara, especially with the opening of the Suadiye Hotel there in 1928.

Known for being quiet, inaccessible and far from city life, many mansions and summerhouses were built in this area. A dock was opened on the shore, but later demolished when the coast was filled in. The Suadiye Mosque still stands next to the station.

== See also ==
- Şaşkınbakkal
