= Galib Pasha Mosque =

Mosque in Kadıköy, Istanbul, Turkey

- Galib Paşa Camii
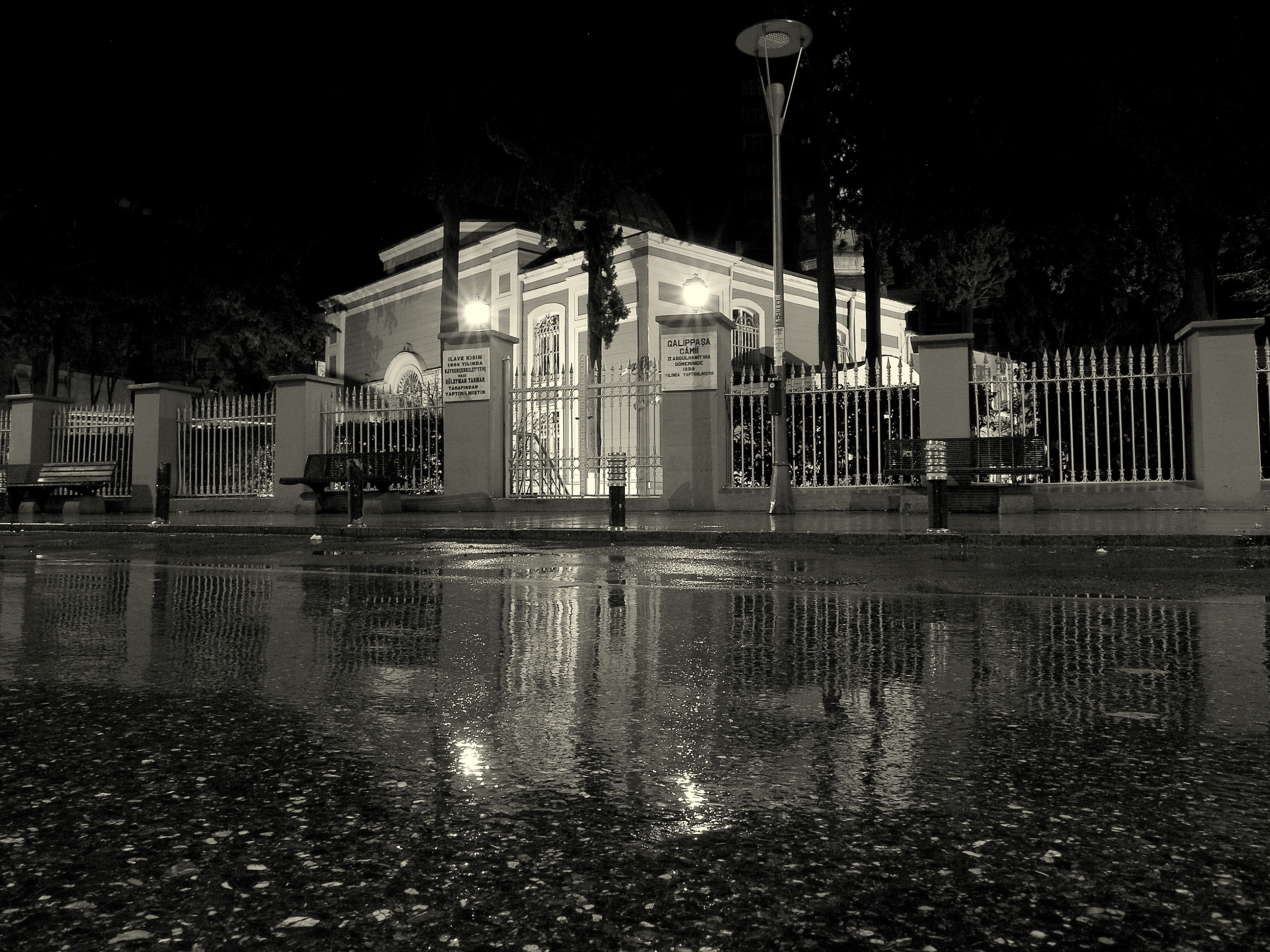
- A black and white photo of the mosque

- Location within Istanbul

Religion
- Affiliation: Islam

Location
- Municipality: Kadıköy, Istanbul
- Country: Turkey
- Interactive map of Galib Pasha Mosque
- Coordinates: 40.9659°N 29.0695°E

Architecture
- Type: mosque
- Founder: Abdullah Galib Pasha
- Established: 1899

The Galib Pasha Mosque (Turkish: Galib Paşa Camii) is a mosque situated on the Bağdat Street in the Caddebostan, neighbourhood and the Erenköy quarter in Kadıköy, Istanbul. It was constructed in 1899 by Abdullah Galib Pasha in the Abdulhamid II period, as written on its entrance. In front of the Galib Pasha Mosque is the Galib Pasha Mosque Fountain.
