= Yenisahra station =

Station of the Istanbul Metro

Yenisahra (M4) Yenisahra (M12)
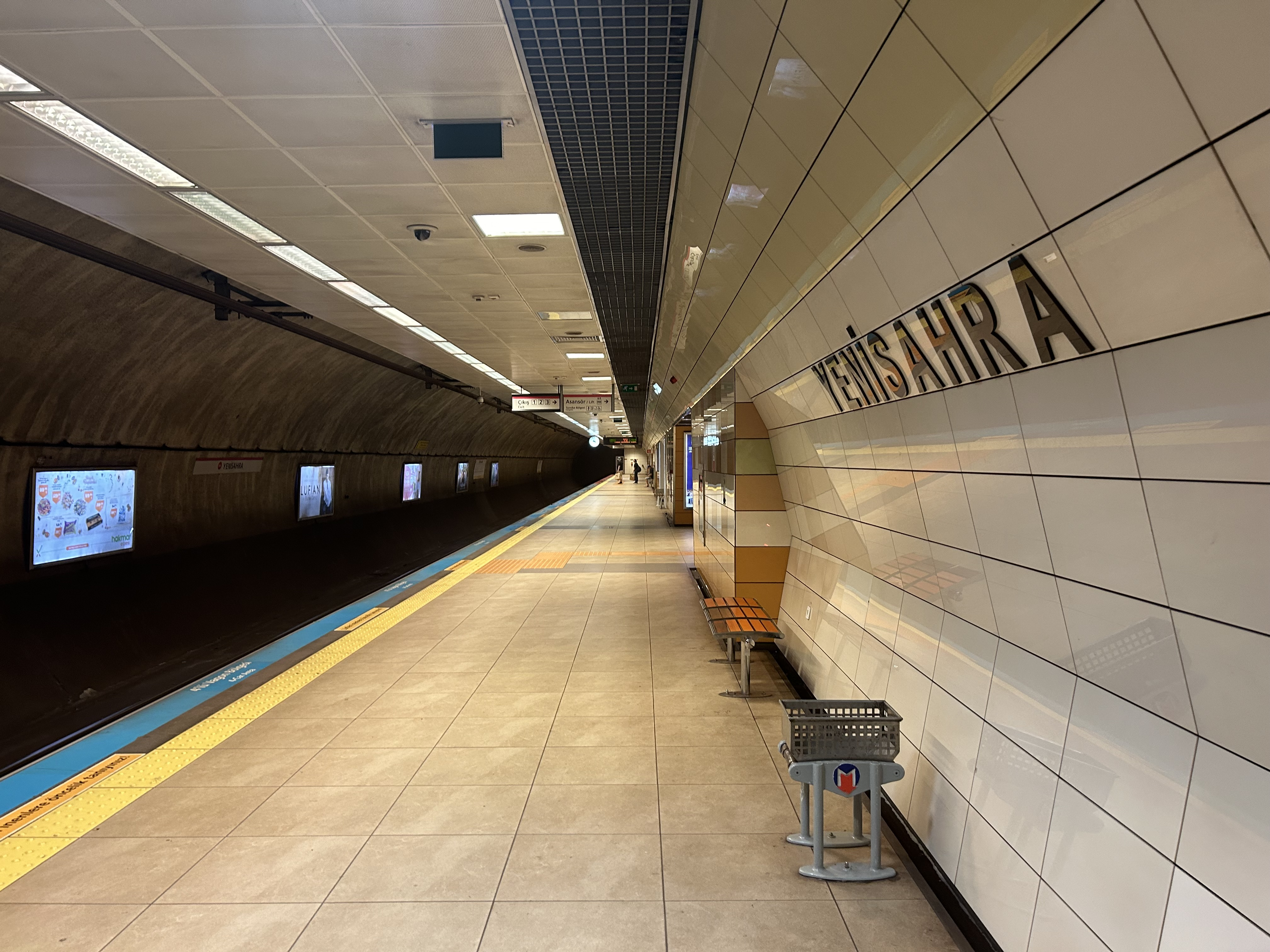
- Platform

General information
- Location: Sahrayıcedid Neighborhood, D.100 E-5 Yanyolu, 34734; Kadıköy, Istanbul; Turkey
- Coordinates: 40°59′04″N 29°5′26″E
- System: Istanbul Metro rapid transit station
- Owner: Istanbul Metropolitan Municipality
- Operator: Istanbul Metro
- Lines: M4; M12 (2026)
- Platforms: 1 island platform
- Tracks: 2
- Connections: İETT Bus: 8A, 8Y, SG-1; Istanbul Minibus: C55 (Kadıköy-Armağanevler), C55 (Kadıköy-Batı Ataşehir-Armağanevler); Havabüs: Kadıköy-SAW, Yenisahra-SAW

Construction
- Structure type: Underground
- Parking: No
- Cycle facilities: Yes
- Accessible: Yes

History
- Opened: M4: 17 August 2012 (14 years ago); M12: Late 2026
- Electrified: 1,500 V DC Overhead line

Services
Preceding station	Istanbul Metro	Following station
Göztepe towards Kadıköy	M4 Line	Kozyatağı towards Sabiha Gökçen Airport
Future service
Sahrayıcedit towards 60. Yıl Parkı	M12 Line (under construction)	Ataşehir towards Kazım Karabekir
Location

Yenisahra is an underground station on the M4 line of the Istanbul Metro. Located under beneath the D.100 state highway, just west of the Kozyatağı Interchange in the Sahrayıcedid neighborhood of Kadıköy, Istanbul, it was opened on 17 August 2012. Connections to Havabüs express bus service to Sabiha Gökçen Airport are available.

== Layout ==
P Platform level	Westbound	← toward Kadıköy (Göztepe)
P Platform level	Island platform, doors will open on the left
P Platform level	Eastbound	toward Sabiha Gökçen Airport (Kozyatağı) →

== Operation information ==
The M4 line operates between 06:00 and 00:00 with a train frequency of 4 minutes at peak hours and 7 minutes at all other times. The line also operates night metro services between 00:00 and 06:00 on Saturdays and Sundays, with trains running every 30 minutes. This provides 66 hours of uninterrupted service between Friday and Sunday. During these hours, fares are charged at double the price. During this time, Entrances 2 and 3 are open, whilst Entrance 1 is closed.

== Gallery ==
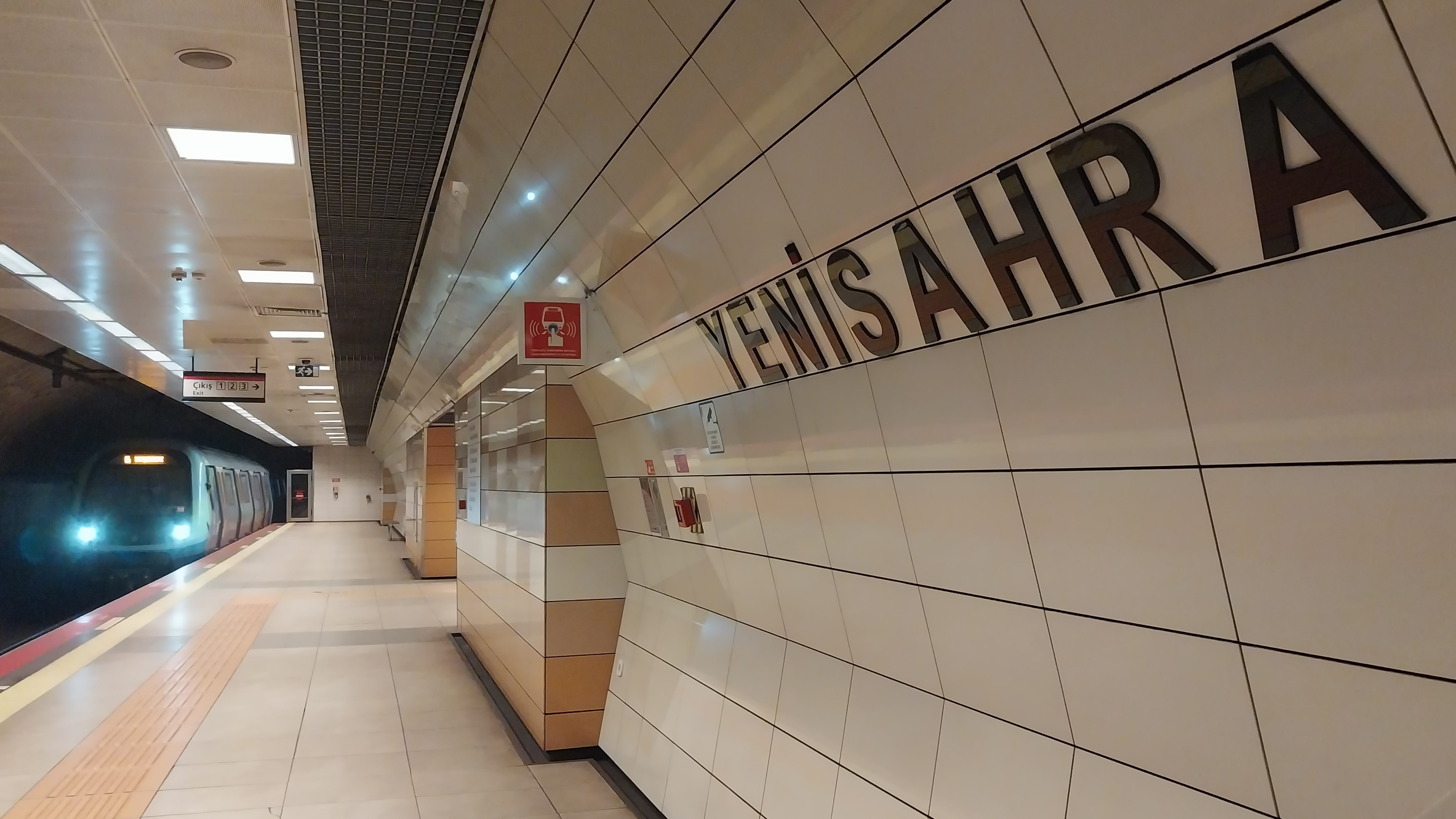
Platform inscription

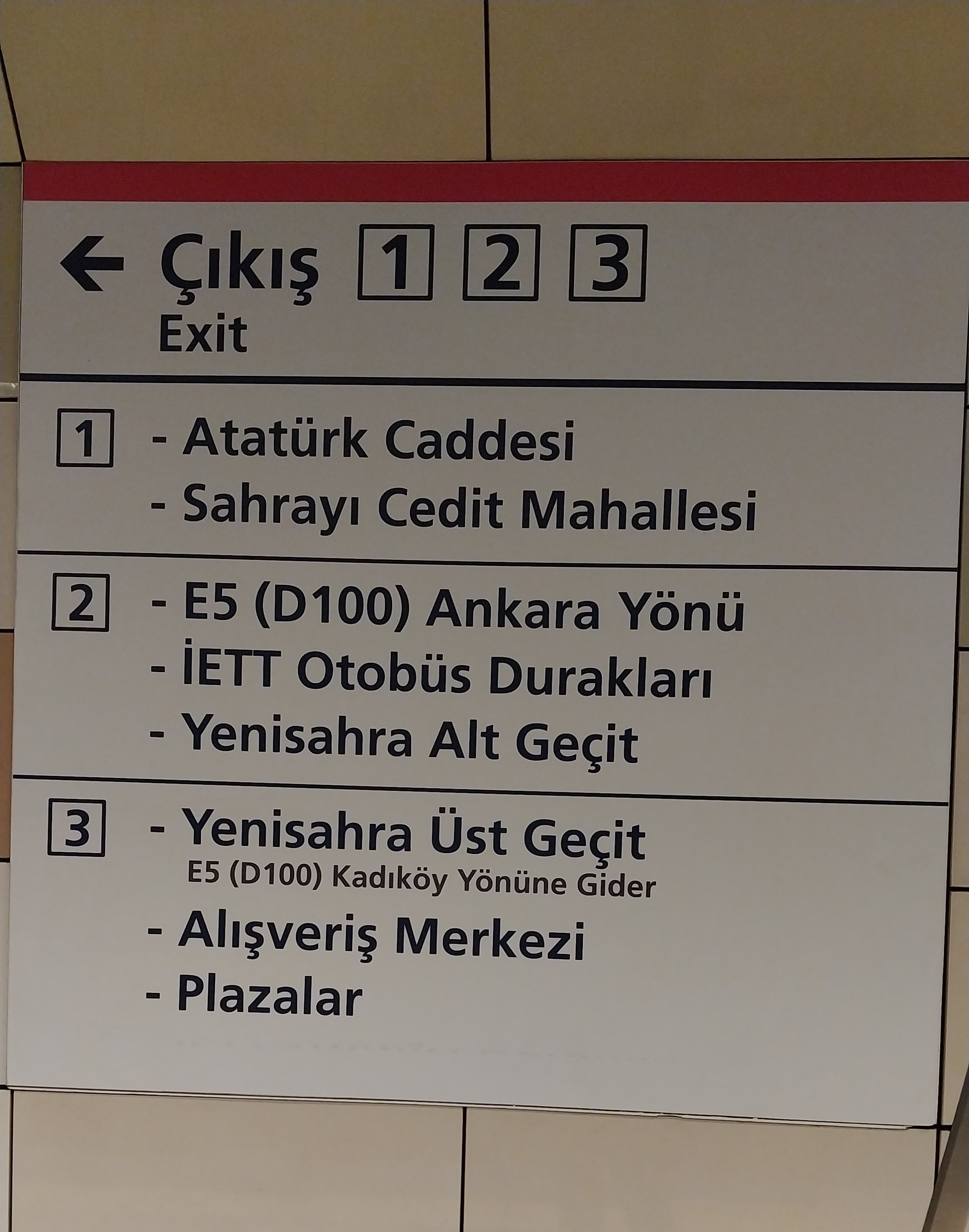
Exit sign

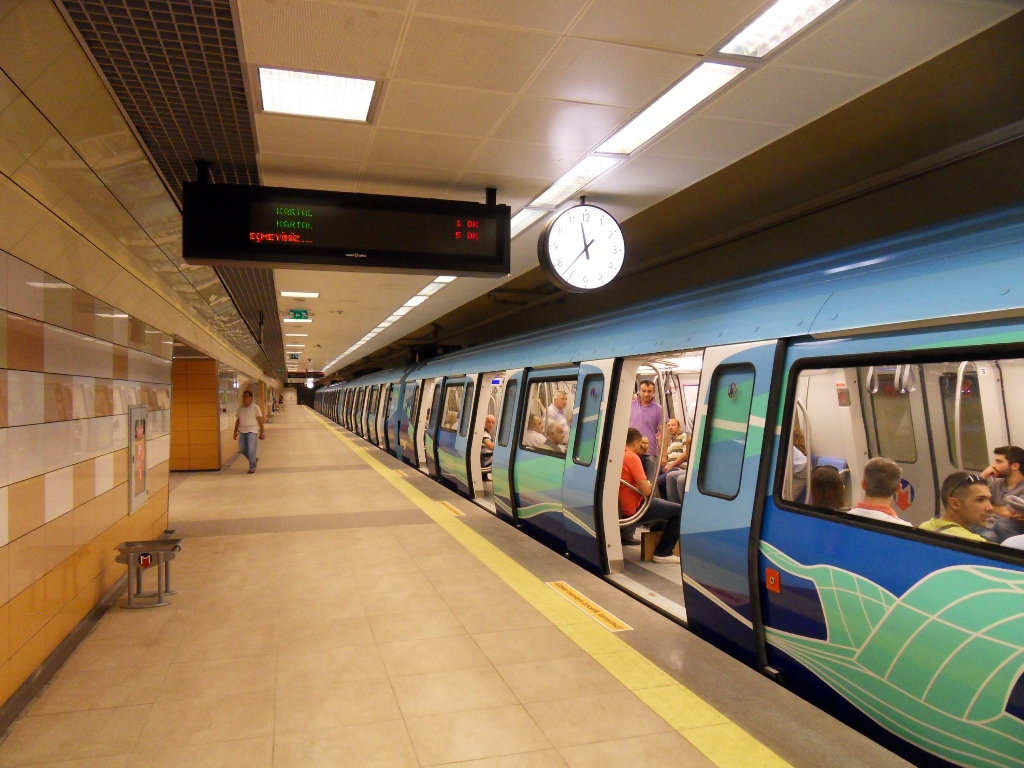
Platform in 2012, shortly after the line opened
