= Çiftehavuzlar, Kadıköy =

Neighborhood in Istanbul, Turkey

Çiftehavuzlar
- Neighbourhood
- Location within Turkey Location within Istanbul
- Coordinates: 40°58′26″N 29°03′18″E
- Country: Turkey
- Province: İstanbul
- District: Kadıköy
- Time zone: UTC+3 (TRT)

Çiftehavuzlar is an informal neighbourhood (semt) in the Kadıköy district of Istanbul, Turkey. It is roughly located west of Göztepe 60. Year Park and east of Selamiçeşme, between the neighbourhoods of Caddebostan and Feneryolu on the Bağdat Avenue.

== Important places ==
- Bağdat Avenue is the main commercial street of the neighbourhood, with a bus stop for Çiftehavuzlar.
- Operatör Cemil Topuzlu Avenue is the coastal street directed towards Bostancı also with a bus stop.
- Göztepe Park is a large park with many facilities, soon getting a metro station on the M12 line.
- Cercle D'orient (Büyük Kulüp) is a private membership club located on the coast.
