= Şaşkınbakkal =

Neighbourhood in Istanbul

Şaşkınbakkal is an informal neighborhood (semt) in the Kadıköy district on the Anatolian side of Istanbul. It is located between Bağdat Avenue and the Sea of Marmara, between the neighborhoods of Suadiye and Caddebostan.

The neighborhood received its name, şaşkın bakkal ("the confused grocer"), from Ahmet Koşar, who opened a grocery store in the area in 1932, when the neighborhood was more or less empty of residents.
