= Bağdat Avenue =

Street in Istanbul, Turkey

Baghdad Avenue
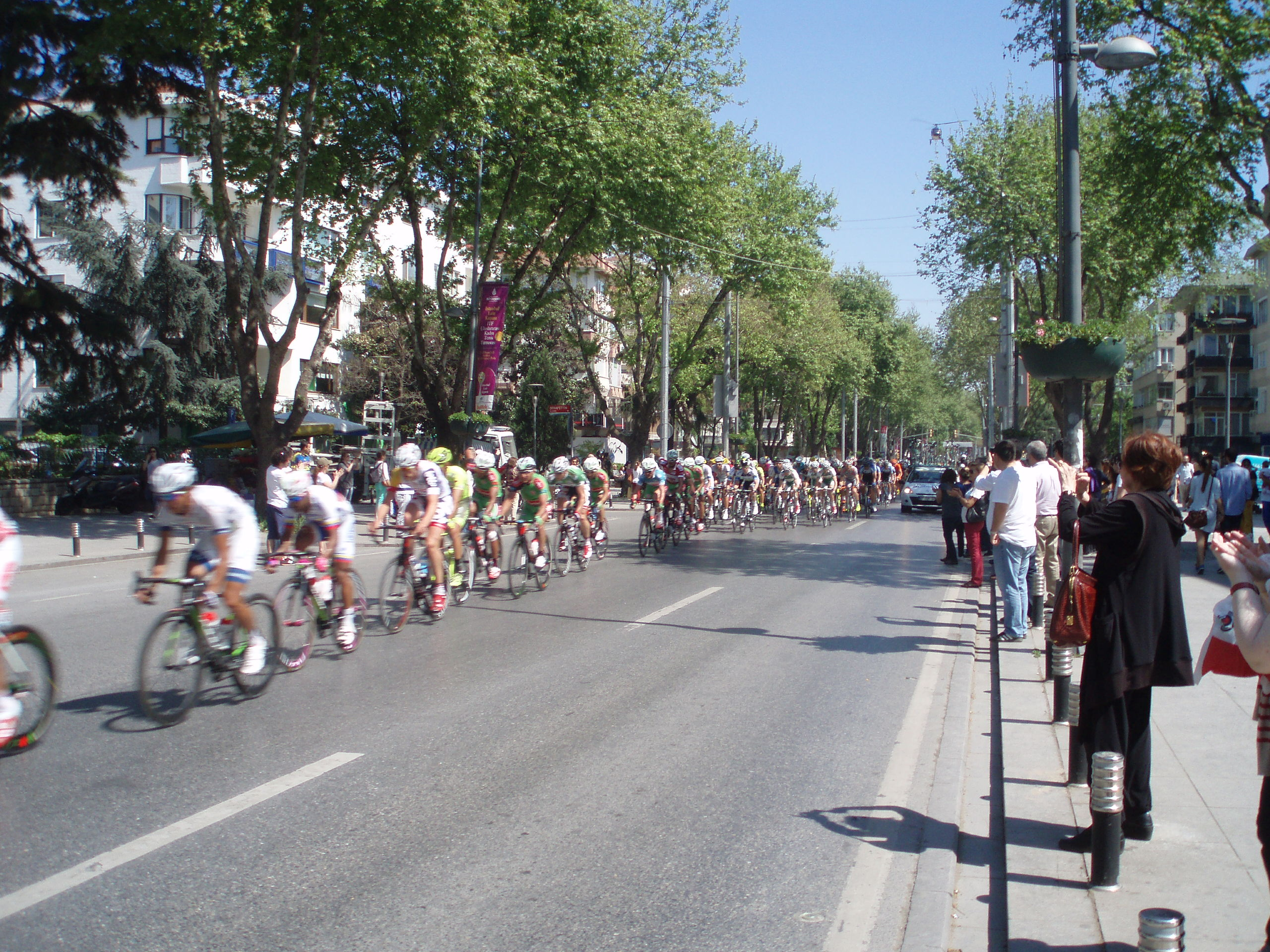
- Riders in Stage 8 of the 49th Presidential Cycling Tour of Turkey at Bağdat Avenue, 2013.
- Interactive map of Baghdad Avenue
- Native name: Bağdat Caddesi (Turkish)
- Length: 14 km (8.7 mi)
- Location: Maltepe-Kadıköy, Istanbul, Turkey
- Postal code: 34846, 34842, 34840, 34744, 34740, 34738, 34730, 34728, 34724, 34722
- Coordinates: 40.96215°N 29.07701°E
- From: Üsküdar Caddesi in Cevizli, Maltepe
- To: Taşköprü Caddesi in Kızıltoprak, Kadıköy

Bağdat Avenue (Turkish: Bağdat Caddesi, lit. 'Baghdad Avenue') is one of the most important high streets on the Anatolian side of Istanbul, Turkey. It runs approximately 14 km (8.7 mi) from Maltepe in the east to Kadıköy in the west, almost paralleling the coastline of the Sea of Marmara. The most important part of the street runs 6 km (3.7 mi) from Bostancı to Kızıltoprak within the district of Kadıköy. Bağdat Avenue is usually seen as the counterpart of Istiklal Avenue on the European side of the city in terms of its importance and glamour although it lacks the fine heritage of historic buildings to be found on Istiklal Avenue with almost all its architecture modern.

Bağdat Caddesi mainly runs through middle and upper-class residential areas. A one-way street for traffic, it is lined with old plane trees and flanked by a series of shopping malls, boutiques and shops, as well as by restaurants serving international and local cuisine, pubs and cafes, luxury car dealers and banks. Most of the shops are open seven days a week, including Sunday afternoons.

Heading westwards, Bağdat Avenue runs through: Cevizli, Maltepe, İdealtepe, Küçükyalı, Altıntepe, Bostancı, Çatalçeşme, Suadiye, Şaşkınbakkal, Erenköy, Caddebostan, Göztepe, Çiftehavuzlar, Selamiçeşme, Feneryolu and Kızıltoprak. The busiest stretches of Bağdat Avenue run between Suadiye and Caddebostan, where most of the shopping malls and fashion stores are located.

== History ==
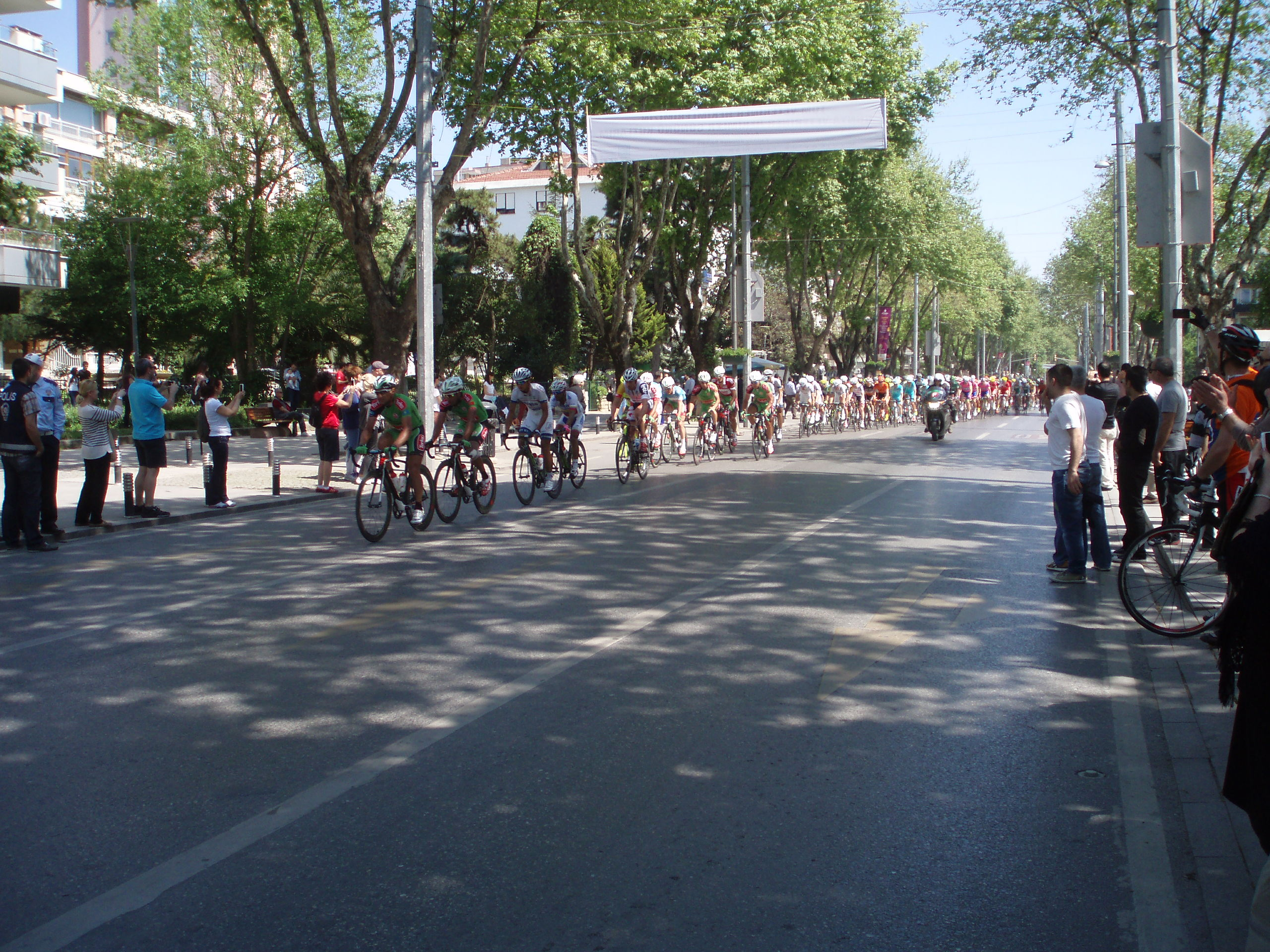
Riders in Stage 8 of the 49th Presidential Cycling Tour of Turkey at Bağdat Avenue, 2013.

Bağdat Avenue started life as a road connecting Constantinople with Anatolia during the Byzantine and later the Ottoman periods, when it was used for trade and military purposes. It acquired its name after the recapture of Baghdad by Sultan Murad IV in 1638. However, the original road started from Üsküdar and passed through Haydarpaşa Meadows, joining what became the later route in Kızıltoprak.

The Ottomans built fountains with namazgahs (open-air areas set aside for prayer) along the road to serve travellers arriving to or departing from the city. Some of the neighbourhoods along Bağdat Avenue are still named after these fountains (Turkish: çeşme), such as Söğütlüçeşme (Willow Fountain), Selamiçeşme, and Çatalçeşme (Forked Fountain).

During the reign of Sultan Abdul Hamid II (1876–1909), some pashas, high officials and wealthy traders purchased land around Bağdat Avenue and erected luxurious chalet-like wooden mansions, a few of which still exist today.

Before World War I, the avenue was paved with cobblestones, and carriages were used for transportation. In the early years of the Republican era, the original cobblestoned avenue was covered with asphalt, and a tram line was constructed between Kadıköy and Bostancı.

Until the 1960s, the coastal area close to Bağdat Avenue served as a summer resort primarily for the city's upper and middle classes, who mainly lived on the European side of İstanbul closer to their businesses. Following the opening of the Bosphorus Bridge in 1973, these low-rise summer houses were pulled down in favour of new high-rise condominiums and some suburbs along Bağdat Avenue developed into particularly desirable residential areas.

== Attractions ==
There are several large public parks just off Bağdat Avenue. These include Özgürlük (Freedom) Park in Selamiçeşme and Göztepe Park which offers displays of tulips in April and of roses in June.

The small mosques along Bağdat Caddesi only date from the late 19th century. Most prominent are the Zühtü Paşa Mosque in Kızıltoprak (1885) and the Galib Pasha Mosque in Caddebostan (1899).

In the back streets of Göztepe there is a fine Toy Museum, signposted by lampposts in the shape of giraffes.

Overlooking the Sea of Marmara at Caddebostan stands the magnificent, if abandoned, Ragıp Pasha Mansion, a work of August Jasmund in 1906. Right next door is the mansion built for his daughter Tevhide Hanım.

== Shopping ==
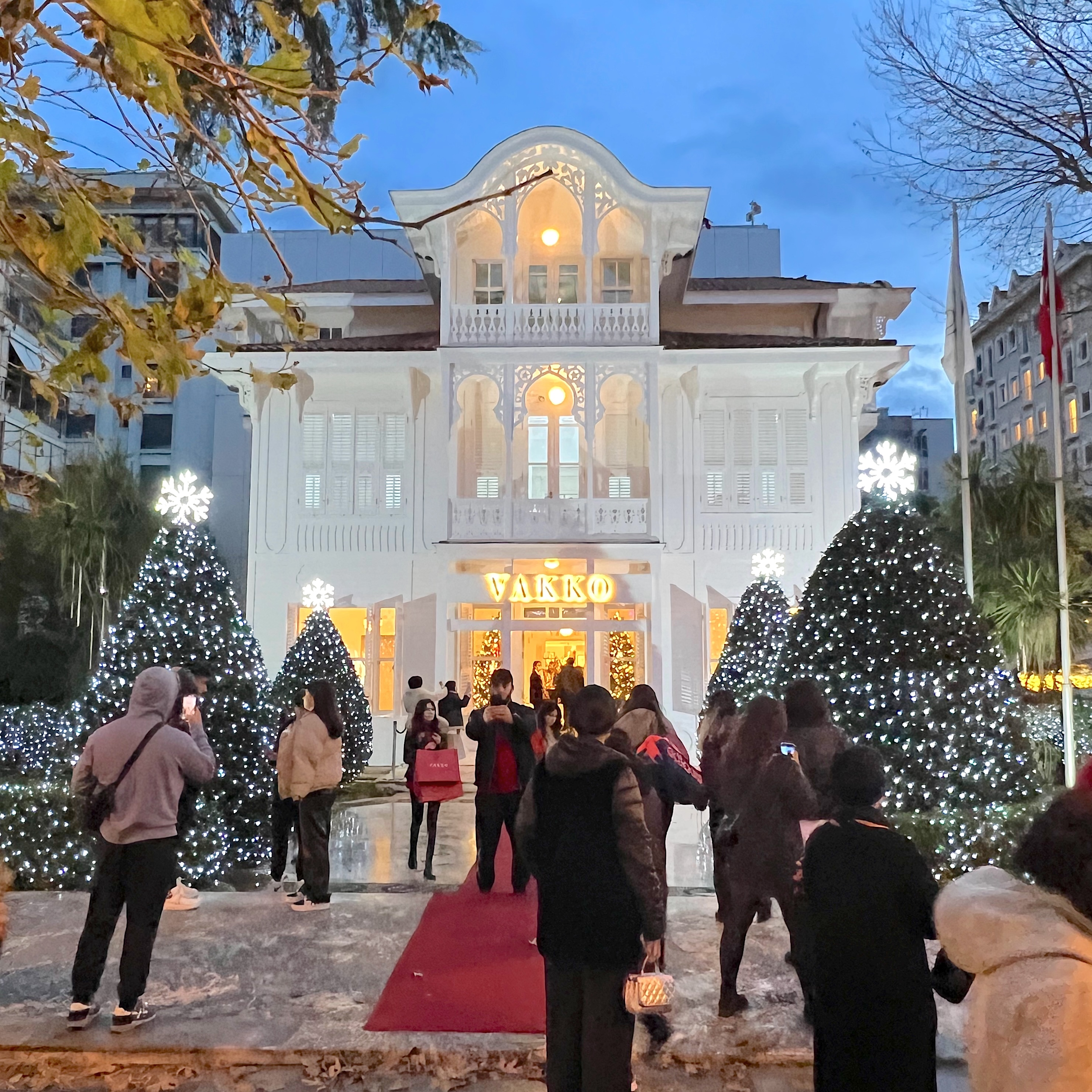
Vakko store on Bağdat Avenue, December 2022

Many mass and upscale retail chains have branches along the avenue, including an Apple Store, the department stores Beymen, Marks & Spencer and Vakko, and boutiques like Brandroom, Burberry, Calzedonia, Chanel, COS, H&M, Kiko, Lacoste, Laura Ashley, Les Benjamins, Longchamp, Louis Vuitton, Mango, Mavi, Michael Kors, Rolex, Sephora, Tommy Hilfiger, Yves Rocher, and Zara. Upscale café and restaurant chains include BigChefs, Bistro 33, Borsa Restaurant, Brasserie Noir, Brasserie Prime, Café Cadde, Caribou Coffee, Filo D'Olio, Godiva, Günaydın steakhouse, Happy Moon's, Il Padrino, Kırıntı, Midpoint, Nespresso, Salt Bae, Shake Shack, Starbucks, Strada, The Townhouse, among others.

Since 1996, the Vakko department store's Suadiye branch has been located in an Ottoman era köşk (wooden villa/summer house) on Bağdat Caddesı. In the survey by Kadıköy Platformu asking which store consumers liked the most for its appearance and displays, 76% answered the Vakko mansion. Vakko's December seasonal decorations are especially popular, with multiple holiday trees and a merry-go-round in front of the store, and more trees, wreaths and candles within. In 2012 the store created artificial snow which fell in front of the store. For New Year's 2018, newspaper Hürriyet awarded Vakko Suadiye the status of "best decorated stores in the city".

== Celebrations ==
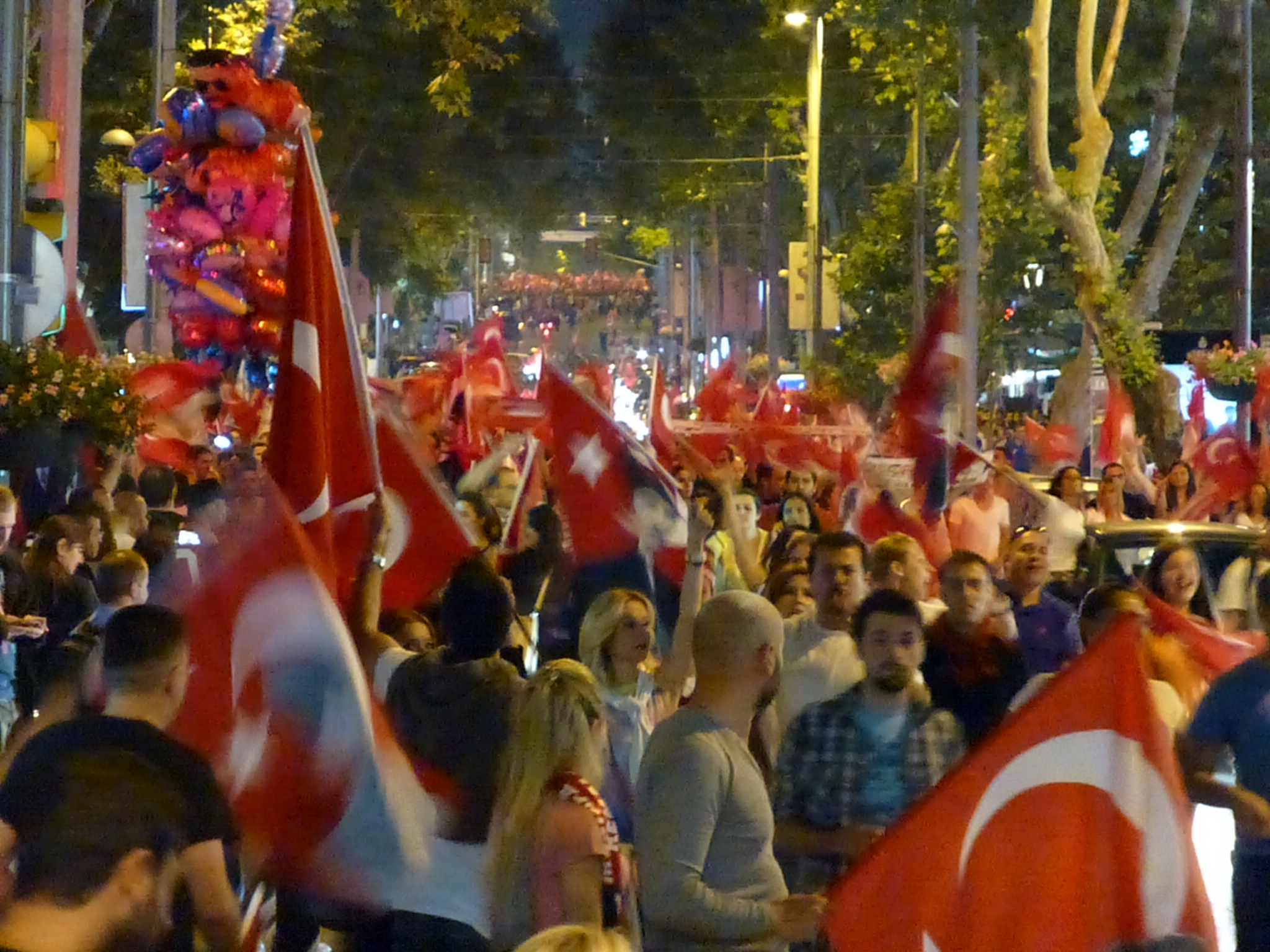
2013 protests in Turkey at Bağdat Avenue, Istanbul.

Bağdat Avenue hosts a cultural parade on the evening of Republic Day, which is celebrated every year on October 29.

Celebrations also take place on Bağdat Avenue whenever the home football team Fenerbahçe SK wins the championship title in the Turkish Super League. Fenerbahçe fans gather here and celebrate by singing, dancing, driving and sounding their car horns all night.

Since the 1960s street racing has formed a local sub-culture, with wealthy young men tag-racing their imported muscle cars. Most of these young men are now middle-agers reliving their years of excitement as famous professional rally or track racers. With the heightened GTI and hot hatch culture starting in the 1990s, street-racing was revived. Towards the end of the 1990s, midnight street racing caused many fatal accidents, which were only reduced by intensive police patrols.

Besides cultural parades, there are also a lot of concerts and competitions that brands such as Red Bull organize. For instance, in August 2022, they organized brought their global Flagtug competition to Caddeboston Sahili (Beach) where competitors attempt to fly their own home-made flying machines. The event was a huge success and was broadcast as a livestream.

== Namesakes ==
In some other parts of Turkey and elsewhere around the world, there are streets of the same name:

- Heliopolis, Egypt
- Sivas, Turkey
- Kayseri, Turkey
- Singapore
- Dubai, UAE

== See also ==
- Abdi İpekçi Avenue
- İstiklal Avenue
- List of upscale shopping districts
