= Ayşegül Sarıca =

- Born: 28 May 1935; Kadıköy, Turkey
- Died: 10 March 2023 (aged 87)
- Genre: Classical music
- Occupation: Pianist
- Years active: 1944–1991
- Spouse: Nejat Diyarbakırlı (m. 1963; died 2017)

Ayşegül Sarıca (28 May 1935 – 10 March 2023) was a Turkish concert pianist, pedagogue.

== Life ==
Ayşegül Sarıca was born into an Ottoman military family in Istanbul, Turkey in 1935. Ahmet İzzet Pasha (1864–1937), one of the last Ottoman grand viziers was her maternal grandfather. In 1955, she married Nejat Diyarbekirli and gave birth to a son named Osman and a daughter Zeynep.

== Music training ==
Prior to the World War II, many German people had escaped from Nazi Germany and emigrated to Turkey. Gertrude Isaac, a pianist was one of them, and she gave Sarıca piano lessons when she was as young as five years old. She continued her study in the Istanbul Municipal Conservatory. There, she became a student of Ferdi Statzer. In 1944, while she was only nine years old, she gave her first recital in Kadıköy Halkevi, Istanbul.

In 1951, she went to Paris, France, to study at the National Concervatory of Paris. Lucette Descaves and Pierre Pasquier were her teachers. In 1953, she graduated with honors.

== Music career ==
After 1968, she became the piano soloist of the Presidential Symphony Orchestra of Turkey. She gave concerts in such countries as the United Kingdom, France, Italy, Germany, Austria, Belgium, Soviet Union, Hungary, former Czechoslovakia, Sweden, Norway, Finland, and Australia. In concerts, she was accompanied often by Ayla Erduran, a close friend and a violinist. Between 1991 and 2000, she served as an academic for musicology at Bilkent University's music master program. Currently, she serves in the Dr Erol Üçer Music Research Center of Istanbul Technical University.

== Awards ==
Sarıca received an honorable mention in the International Munich Piano Competition in 1954. In 1957, she won the special prize, "Gabriel Fauré Association," in 1959 she won one special prize "City of Paris" in the Marguerite Long–Jacques Thibaud Competition. In 1971, she was given the honorary title of State Artist by the Ministry of Culture. In 1970 she was decorated with golden "Beethoven medal" for her Beethoven interpretations by German Ministry of Culture. In 1974, she received the Chevalier de I’Ordre des Arts et des Lettres from the French Ministry of Culture. In 2006, she was awarded the “Merit of Honor" in music by the Istanbul Culture and Art Foundation."

== See also ==
- Arif Sarıca Mansion (built 1903), her grandfather's mansion as her residence.
- Ateş Orga. Midsummer Istanbul.
