= Göztepe 60. Year Park =

Park in Istanbul

Coordinates: 40°58′10″N 29°03′28″E

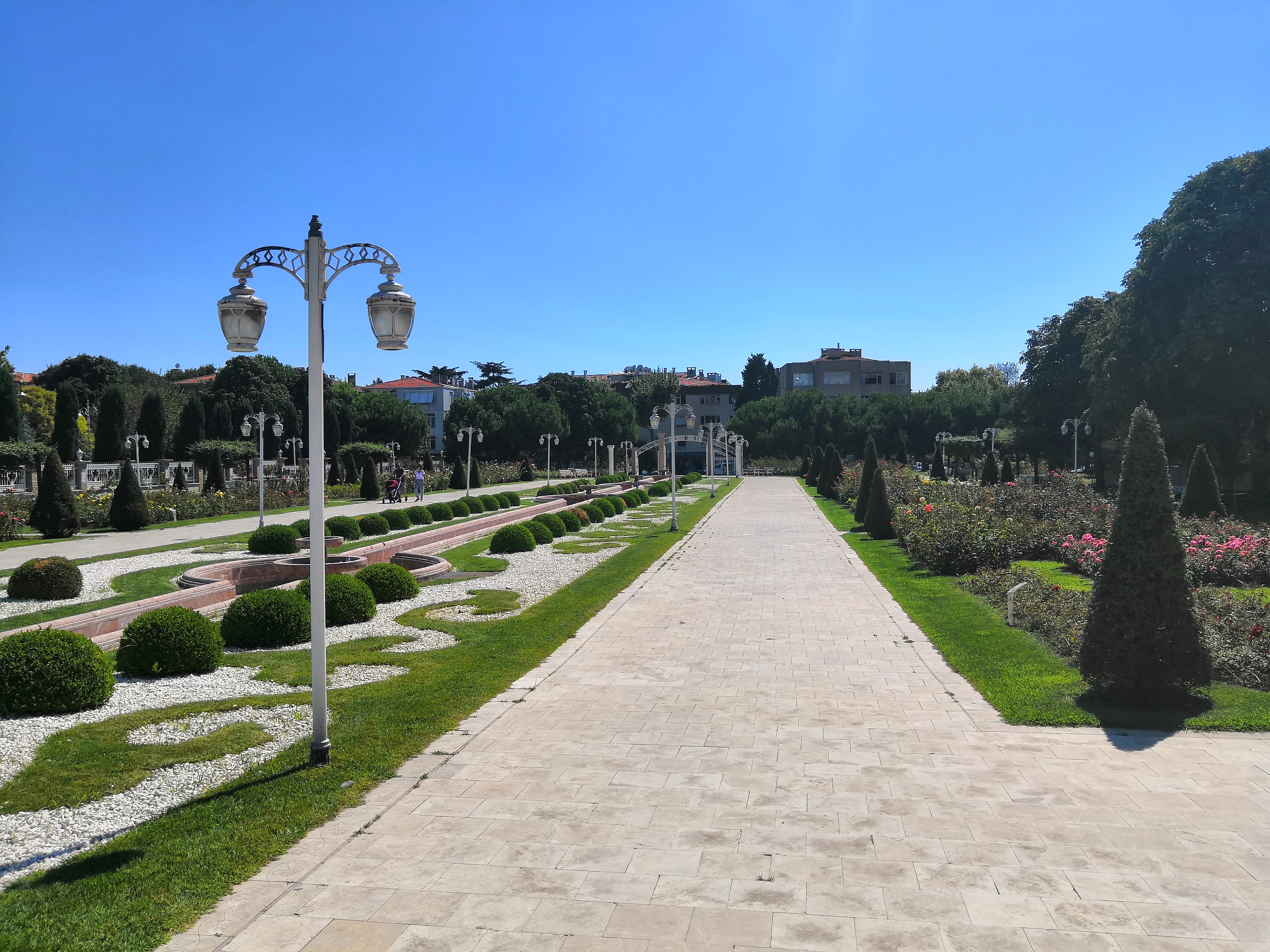
- Interactive map of Göztepe 60. Year Park
- Location: Kadıköy, Istanbul
- Area: 80.475 m²

Göztepe 60. Year Park (Turkish: Göztepe 60. Yıl Parkı), commonly referred to as just Göztepe Park(ı), is a park located in the Caddebostan neighborhood and the Göztepe quarter in the Kadıköy district of Istanbul. To the north is Bağdat Avenue and to the south is Operatör Cemil Topuzlu Avenue. Inside the park, there are children playgrounds, flower gardens and exercise areas.

In March 2024, the Kemal Sunal Museum, a Kemal Sunal themed museum, was opened inside of the park.

The 60. Yıl Parkı metro station will be opened in the future, connecting the park to Ataşehir and Ümraniye through the M12 line.

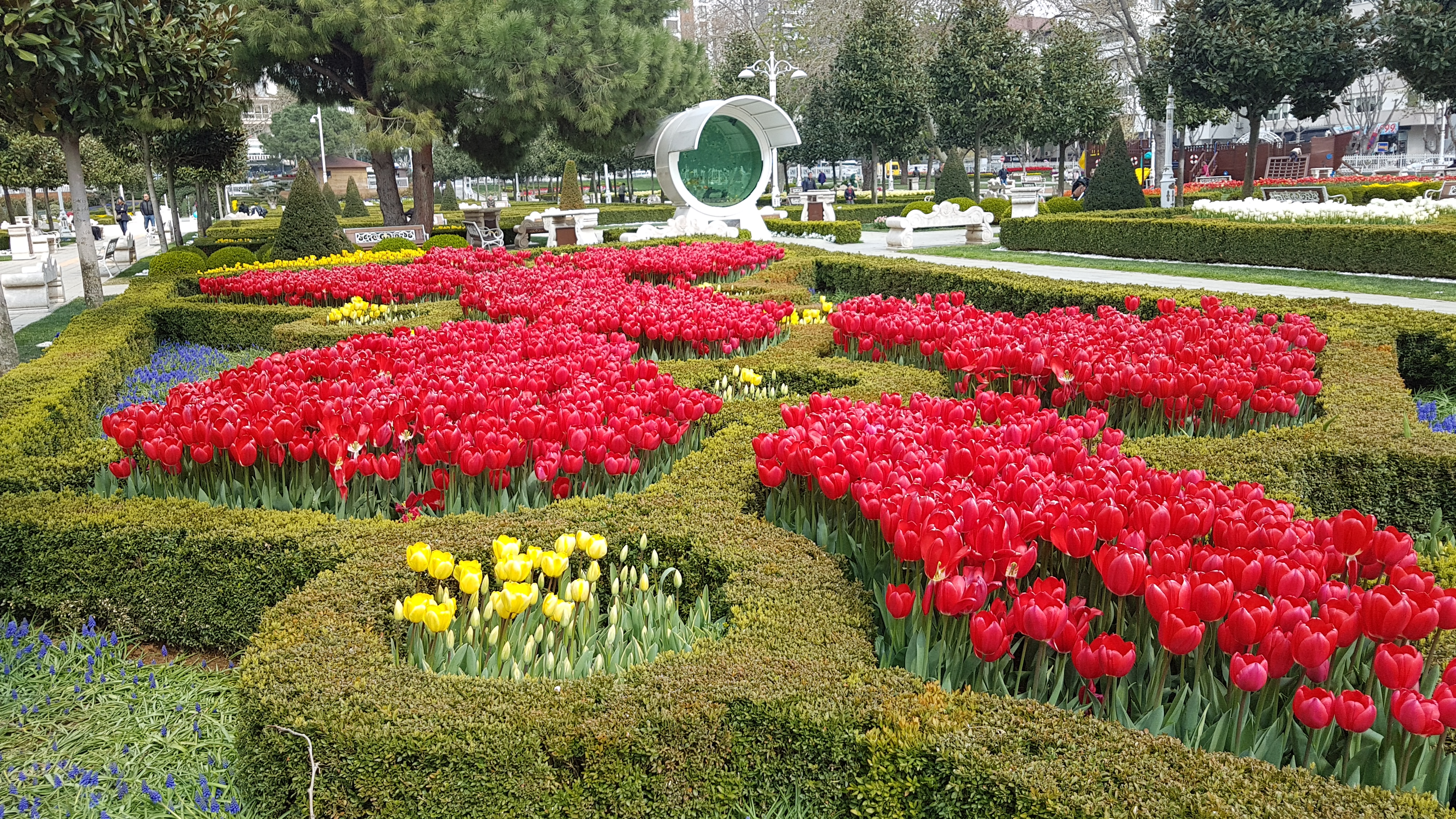
A tulip garden in the park
