= Caddebostan Synagogue =

Synagogue in Istanbul, Turkey

- Location of the synagogue in Istanbul

Religion
- Affiliation: Judaism
- Rite: Nusach Sefard
- Ecclesiastical or organizational status: Synagogue
- Status: Active

Location
- Location: 3 Taş Mektep Street, Göztepe, Kadıköy, Istanbul, Istanbul Province
- Country: Turkey
- Interactive map of Caddebostan Synagogue
- Coordinates: 40°58′27″N 29°03′48″E

Architecture
- Architect: Albert Arditi
- Type: Synagogue architecture
- Completed: 1954
- Materials: Concrete

The Caddebostan Synagogue is a Jewish congregation and synagogue, located at 3 Taş Mektep Street, in Göztepe, in the Kadıköy district of Istanbul, in the Istanbul Province of Turkey.

Designed by Albert Arditi, the synagogue was completed in 1954. As a result of the increase of the Jewish population in the area, the synagogue is the most populated one on the Asian side of the city and visits and participation in prayers is possible by contacting the Chief Rabbinate. The synagogue was active with the demand made to the Turkish authorities by the Chief Rabbinate on the 1 April 1961.

== See also ==
- History of the Jews in Turkey
- List of synagogues in Turkey
- Caddebostan
