= Elazığspor =

Association football team in Turkey

- Full name: Elazığspor Kulübü
- Nickname: Gakgoşlar
- Founded: 1967; 59 years ago
- Ground: Elazığ Atatürk Stadium
- Capacity: 18,423
- Chairman: Ahmet Feti Yılmaz
- Head coach: Mustafa Sarıgül
- League: TFF 2. Lig
- 2025–26: TFF 2. Lig, White, 3rd of 19
- Website: elazigspor.net
Home colours	Away colours	Third colours

Elazığspor is a Turkish professional football club located in Elazığ and currently competes in the TFF Second League. They play their home games at Elazığ Atatürk Stadium in Elazığ, which has a maximum capacity of 18,423. The club was founded in 1967. They have also played in the Süper Lig many times in the past.

== History ==
Elazığspor was founded in 1967 when three clubs (Merkez Gençlik, Güvenspor and Harputspor) were united to form a strong team for the city of Elazığ. The club's emblem refers to a famous local dance called Çayda Çıra. This dance is performed with candles in the hands. Elazığspor's main rivals are Malatyaspor. The cities Elazığ and Malatya, were Malatyaspor play, are neighboring cities. Due to the rivalry meaning a lot to those fan bases, extra security is almost a necessity to make sure of safety. Due to the fan bases dislike for each other, sometimes the visiting team's fans will not be allowed to attend the game due to security reasons. Usually, there will be around 30 journalists from Malatya to attend the game whenever the rivalry is being hosted by Elazığspor. The “Doğunun derbisi” has become one of the biggest football rivalries in Turkey.

One friendly match that Elazığspor played versus Diyarbakırspor on September 5, 2011, turned tragic. Fans of both teams threw stones and hard objects at each other. One lieutenant and 1 expert sergeant died to the fan's behaviors. A total of 6 people were injured. These events happened during the middle of the match, as the game had to be delayed until the events that were going on came down. The club has played in the Second and Third Leagues for several years. Finally in 2002, the club was promoted to the Turkish First Football League. However, in 2004, they were relegated to the TFF First League again. They were relegated to the TFF Second League in 2008 after finishing in 16th place.

In January 2019, Elazığspor hit the news after signing 22 players in 2 hours on 30 January, after negotiating the end of a transfer ban imposed by the Turkish Football Federation. The club, which made so many transfers in such a short time, entered the Guinness Book of Records.

The club withdrew from the 2019-20 2. Lig after the 2020 Elazığ earthquake. Next season, the club was allowed to compete in the 2020-21 2. Lig.

== League participation ==
- Süper Lig: 2002–04, 2012–2014
- TFF First League: 1974–82, 1983–85, 1986–87, 1990–92, 1995–02, 2004–08, 2011–12, 2014–2019
- TFF Second League: 1968–75, 1985–86, 1987–90, 1992–95, 2008–11, 2019–2021, 2024–
- TFF Third League: 1982–83, 2021–2022, 2022–2024

== Current squad ==
As of 1 October 2026

Note: Flags indicate national team as defined under FIFA eligibility rules; some limited exceptions apply. Players may hold more than one non-FIFA nationality.

No.	Pos.	Nation	Player
1	FW	TUR	Sertaç Çam
3	DF	TUR	Veli Çetin
4	DF	TUR	Çağlayan Menderes
5	MF	TUR	Emir Alagöz
6	DF	TUR	Feyyaz Belen
7	FW	AZE	Barış Ekincier
8	MF	TUR	Hakan Yavuz
9	FW	TUR	Kemal Rüzgar
10	DF	TUR	Onur Eriş
11	FW	TUR	Enes Soy
17	MF	TUR	Ali Altınöz
19	FW	TUR	Serhat Genç
20	DF	TUR	Erhan Kartal
22	MF	TUR	Alperen Pak

No.	Pos.	Nation	Player
23	FW	TUR	Mert Örnek
25	GK	TUR	Atakan Ordu (on loan from Galata SK)
26	GK	TUR	Yusuf Ayaz
27	MF	TUR	Bünyamin Güler
30	MF	TUR	Esat Buğa (on loan from Konyaspor)
35	DF	TUR	Alp Arda Abay (on loan from Antalyaspor)
44	MF	TUR	Efe Tatlı
55	DF	TUR	Mustafa Akyıldız (on loan from Fenerbahçe)
58	DF	TUR	Ali Yeşilyurt (on loan from Galatasaray)
67	GK	TUR	Habib Zeybek
77	GK	TUR	Furkan Köse
80	MF	TUR	Muhammed Demirci
97	FW	TUR	Fuat Bavuk

=== Out on loan ===
Note: Flags indicate national team as defined under FIFA eligibility rules; some limited exceptions apply. Players may hold more than one non-FIFA nationality.

No. / Pos. / Nation / Player	No. / Pos. / Nation / Player

== Notable players ==
Bosnia and Herzegovina

- (Bosnia and Herzegovina) Aldin Čajić
- (Bosnia and Herzegovina) Ivan Sesar
- (Bosnia and Herzegovina) Ognjen Vranješ

Croatia

- (Croatia) Vanja Iveša

France

- (France) Julien Faubert

Iceland

- (Iceland) Theódór Elmar Bjarnason

Netherlands

- (Netherlands) Marvin Zeegelaar

Sweden

- (Sweden) Emir Kujović

Turkey

- (Turkey) Ersan Gülüm
- (Turkey) Kadir Bekmezci
- (Turkey) Kerim Frei
- (Turkey) Serdar Gürler

== Managers ==
- (Serbia) Milorad Mitroviç (2003-2003)
- (Turkey) Güvenç Kurtar (2003–2004)
- (Turkey) Erol Tok (2007–2008)
- (Turkey) Şerafettin Tutaş (2008–2008)
- (Turkey) Osman Özköylü (2010–2011)
- (Turkey) Hüsnü Özkara (2011–2012)
- (Turkey) Bülent Uygun (2012–2012)
- (Turkey) Yılmaz Vural (2012–2013)
- (Norway) Trond Sollied (2013–2013)
- (Turkey) Okan Buruk (2013–2014)
- (Turkey) Ümit Özat (2014–2015)
- (Turkey) Bayram Bektaş (2015-2015)
- (Turkey) İbrahim Üzülmez (2015–2015)
- (Turkey) Kemal Özdeş (2016–2016)
- (Turkey) Coşkun Demirbakan (2016–2016)
- (Turkey) Ogün Temizkanoğlu (2016–2016)
- (Turkey) Bayram Bektaş (2016–2017)
- (Turkey) Mehmet Altıparmak (2017–2017)
- (Turkey) Hüseyin Kalpar (2017–2018)
- (Turkey) Muammer Sürmeli (2017–2018)
- (Turkey) Orhan Kaynak (2018–2019)
- (Turkey) Erhan Altın (2018–2019)
- (Turkey) Serhat Gülpınar (2018–2019)
- (Turkey) Sefer Yılmaz (2019–2019)
- (Turkey) Levent Eriş (2019–2020)
- (Turkey) Orhan Kaynak (2020–2020)
- (Turkey) Ümit Tekoğlu (2021–2021)
- (Turkey) Cafer Aydın (2021–2021)
- (Turkey) Kenan Kamaç (2021–2021)
- (Turkey) Cafer Aydın (2021–2022)
- (Turkey) Alaettin Tutaş (2022–2021)
- (Turkey) Ramazan Çelik (2022–2022)
