= Arif Sarıca Mansion =

Ottoman-era mansion in Istanbul, Turkey

- Moda Arif Sarıca Köşkü
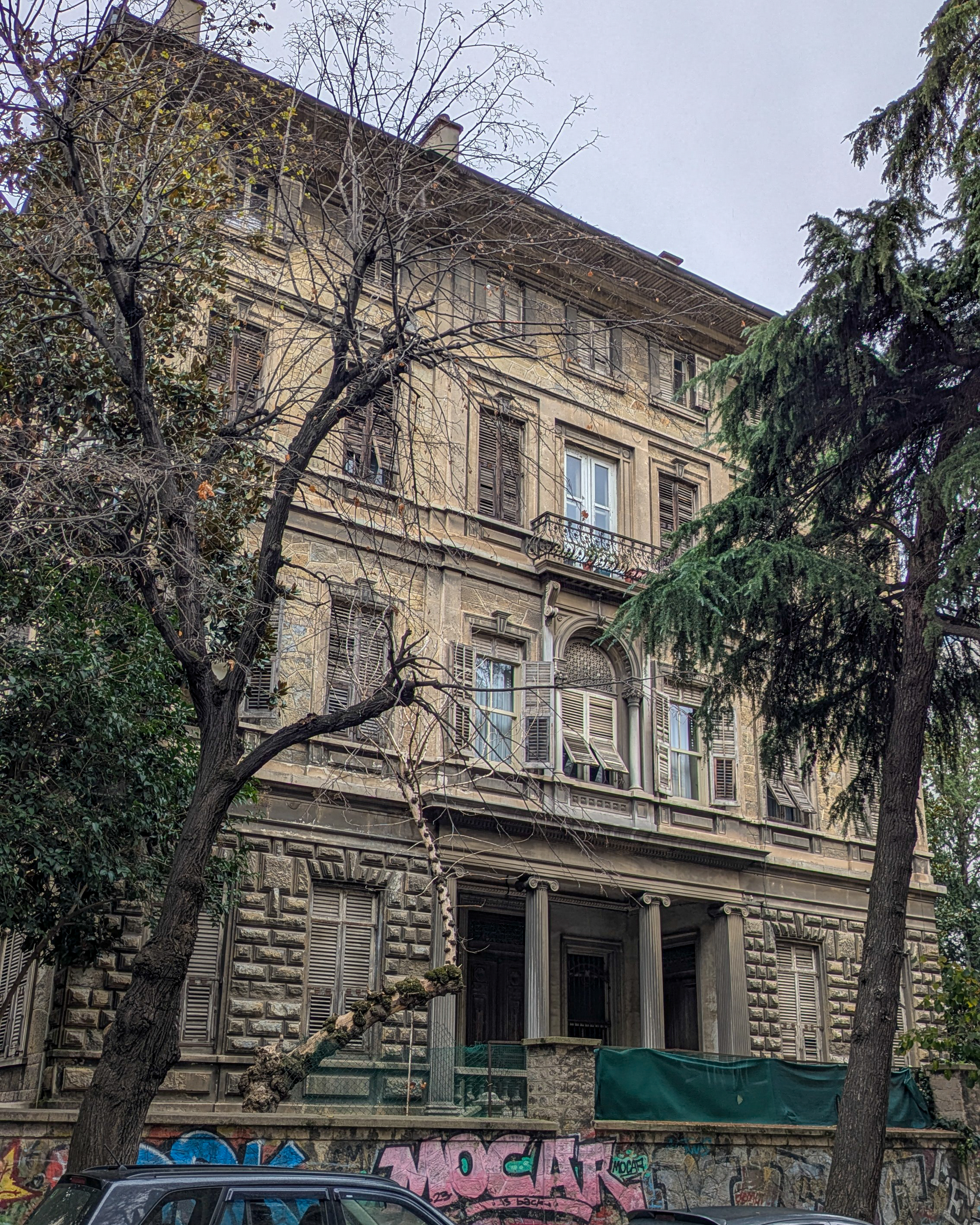
- Interactive map of the Arif Sarıca Mansion area

General information
- Location: Kadıköy, Moda, Kadıköy, Istanbul, Turkey
- Coordinates: 40.98169°N 29.02336°E
- Completed: 1903; 123 years ago

Design and construction
- Architect: C. Pappa

Arif Sarıca Mansion (Turkish: Moda Arif Sarıca Köşkü) is an Ottoman-era mansion in Istanbul, Turkey. It was built in 1903.

== Background ==
Arif Sarıca, also known as Arif Pasha, was born in Euboea (Turkish: Eğriboz) as a member of a family with military roots. He was promoted to one of the court physicians of the Ottoman Sultan Abdulhamid II (r. 1876–1909) at the Yıldız Palace after he cured the sultan. His brother Ragıp Pasha served as aide de camp to the sultan.

== Mansion ==
Arif Sarıca Mansion, also called as "Apartment Sarıca", is located at Moda Avenue 147 in Moda quarter of Kadıköy district in Istanbul, Turkey. The place Moda in Kadıköy became an outstanding residential area only after the 1870s, when first wealthy non-Muslim families, like the bankers Lorando and Tubini and later the Whittall and Lafontain, settled down by building their own mansions.

Built in 1903, its architect was an Ottoman Greek C. Pappa. The building is situated within a large garden surrounded with a 3 m (9.8 ft)-high masonry stone wall. Entrance to the premises was originally through two iron gates, one of which was for service. During the construction of the tram line in the street in the 1930s, the street-side garden wall was retracted, and the main gate removed. The masonry stone mansion consists of a basement, ground floor, three floors and attic. It was designed as an apartment building for the Sarıca Family members. The monumental entrance featuring four marble columns with Ionic capitals is reached from the street by a crescent-shaoed mosaic-paved and marble-walled walkway. The diverse typed cornices balances the vertical effect on the façade of the building. The windows are covered with white-painted horizontal wooden slat blinds of so-called "Istanbul-type", which can be lowered and drawn. The floors are separated with big double-wing doors in front of the staircaeses. As common in mansions and waterfront residences of the era, the rooms on each floor open to a hall in the center.

Arif Pasha lived in the street-side apartment on the ground floor, which was accessible through the main gate. All other family members lived in the upstairs used the second entrance. The servant living in the basement used a service staircase, which was connected to the kitchen, the central hall and the stairhead of each upstair floors. At each floor stairhead, a restroom for the servants and a small storage is found. The walls and ceilings at each floor are decorated with frescoes and crown moldings.

== History ==
During the Occupation of Istanbul (1918 – 1923) by the Allied troops of the World War I, British forces evacuated the mansion, and handed over to the Armenians to be used as a primary school for more than two years. Many objects of the mansion were ruined or got lost during the occupation years. The Sarıca Family regained the possession of the mansion following the liberation of Istanbul after the Turkish War of Independence. The mansion is still owned by the grandchildren of the Sarıca Family. Concert pianist Ayşegül Sarıca (born 1935) resides in the mansion.

== See also ==
- Ragıp Pasha Mansion (built 1906), residence of Arif Pasha's brother Ragıp Pasha in Caddebostan, Kadıköy.
