= M12 (Istanbul Metro) =

Under construction metro line in Istanbul, Turkey

M12 60. Yıl Parkı-Kazım Karabekir
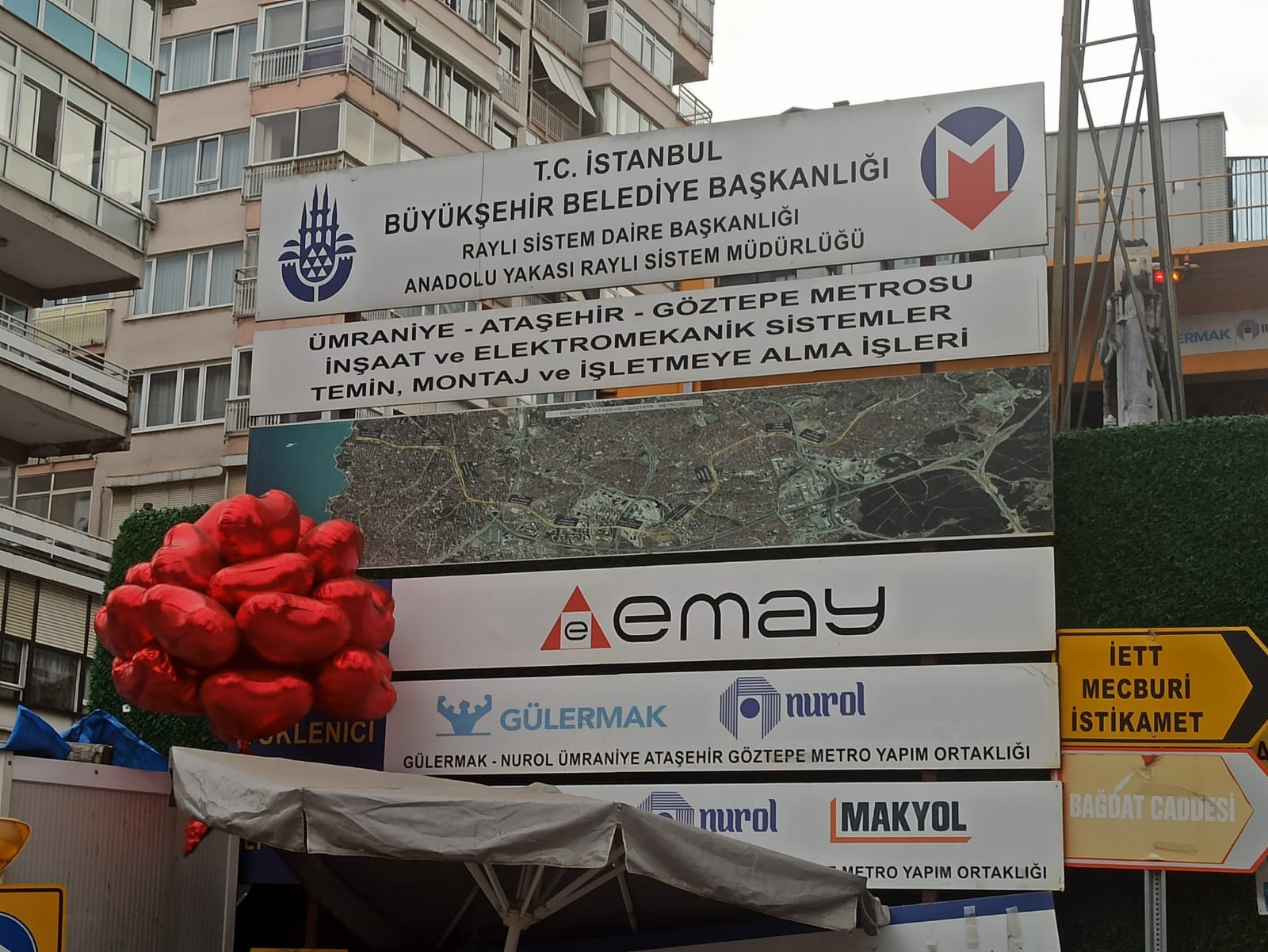
- Construction of the line at Tütüncü Mehmet Efendi station in 2023

Overview
- Status: Under construction
- Owner: Istanbul Metropolitan Municipality
- Locale: Istanbul, Turkey
- Termini: 60. Yıl Parkı; Kazım Karabekir
- Stations: 11
- Website: https://uagmetro.ist/

Service
- Type: Rapid transit
- System: Istanbul Metro
- Services: 1
- Operator: Metro İstanbul A.Ş.

History
- Planned opening: 19 December 2026 (35 days' time)

Technical
- Line length: 13.03 km (8.10 mi)
- Num of tracks: 2
- Track gauge: 1,435 mm (4 ft 8 1/2 in) standard gauge
- Electrification: 1,500 V DC Overhead line

Line M12, officially referred to as the M12 60. Yıl Parkı-Kazım Karabekir line, is a rapid transit line of the Istanbul Metro system, currently under construction in the Asian part of Istanbul, Turkey.

Built by the Istanbul Metropolitan Municipality, the line will be 13.03 km (8.10 mi) long with 11 stations. The travel time between the end stations will be 21 minutes. It is expected that it will carry around 44,000 riders per hour per direction. The line will run through three districts of Istanbul, namely Kadıköy, Ataşehir and Ümraniye. It will connect to other rapid transit lines at Tütüncü Mehmet Efendi station to the Marmaray commuter rail, at Yenisahra to line M4 Kadıköy–Sabiha Gökçen Airport, and at Çarşı to line M5 Üsküdar–Sultanbeyli.

The investment budget of the construction is ₺ 2.376 billion. The construction of the line began with work at the southern terminus, 60. Yıl Parkı, in August 2017, however work was stopped on 2 January 2018.

The new mayor, Ekrem İmamoğlu, announced that the metropolitan municipality restarted the construction works. The first test runs on the line were launched on 14 March 2024, between Göztepe and Kazım Karabekir, but construction on the line stopped again later in 2024. Work restarted in October 2025, with the line's operation now expected to begin on 19 December 2026.

As of April 2026, construction on the line is 97% complete.

== Stations ==
No	Station	District	Connections	Type	Notes
1	60. Yıl Parkı	Kadıköy	İETT Bus: 4, 16, 16D, ER1, ER2, FB1, FB2, GZ1, GZ2	Underground	Göztepe Park・Caddebostan・Bağdat Avenue
2	Tütüncü Mehmet Efendi	Kadıköy	(Göztepe); İETT Bus: 4, 16, 16D, ER1, ER2, FB1, FB2, GZ1, GZ2	Underground	Tütüncü Mehmet Efendi Street
3	Sahrayıcedit	Kadıköy	İETT Bus: 2, 8E, 9K, 10B, 10E, 10G, 14AK, 14B, 14CE, 14ES, 14Y, 14ÇK, 14ŞB, 15SK, 15YK, 15ÇK, 17, 17L, 19ES, 19F, 19K, 19M, 19S, 19Y, 20D, 20K, ER1, ER2, FB1, FB2, GZ1, GZ2	Underground	Sahrayıcedit Mosque・Fahrettin Kerim Gökay Street
4	Yenisahra	Ataşehir	İETT Bus: 8A, 8Y	Underground	Habire Yahşi Anatolian High School
5	Ataşehir	Ataşehir	İETT Bus: 8A, 8K, 8Y, 10A, 13, 13AB, 16M, 19FS, 256, KM46	Underground	Ülker Sports and Event Hall・Palladium Shopping Mall
6	Finans Merkezi	Ümraniye	(Finanskent, planned)・ (planned); İETT Bus: 8K, 8Y, 11M, 13B, 13H, 13M, 13Y, 14BK, 19FS, 20D	Underground	Istanbul Financial Center
7	Site	Ümraniye	İETT Bus: 8K, 8Y, 11M, 13B, 13H, 13M, 19FS, 20D	Underground	SOYAK Yenişehir Apartments
8	Atakent	Ümraniye	İETT Bus: 9A, 10G, 11M, 13AB, 14B, 20Ü	Underground	İstiklal Martyr Lokman Oktay Secondary School・Istiklal Park
9	Çarşı	Ümraniye	İETT Bus: 9A, 9Ç, 9Ş, 9Ü, 9ÜD, 10, 11D, 11G, 11K, 11P, 11V, 13, 13B, 13H, 13TD, 14, 14B, 14DK, 14E, 14ES, 14K, 14YE, 19D, 20, 131, 131A, 131B, 131C, 131T, 131TD, 131YS, 131Ü, 138, 139, 139A, 320, 522	Underground	Ümraniye Bazaar・Alemdağ Street
10	SBÜ Hastanesi	Ümraniye	İETT Bus: 7, 9, 9K, 9T, 10, 10G, 11, 11A, 11ÇB, 11K, 11P, 11ST, 11ÜS, 13H, 14D, 14E, 14K, 14YK, 15B, 15BK, 15TK, 15TY, 20, 20K, MR9	Underground	Ümraniye Municipality & District Governorate・Istanbul 29 May University Ümraniye Campus・Ümraniye Training & Research Hospital
11	Kâzım Karabekir	Ümraniye	(planned); İETT Bus: 7, 11K, 11ST, 14E, 14K, 15B, 15YK 20K	Underground	Adem Yavuz Street・Seyrantepe Street
