= Ragıp Pasha Mansion =

Ottoman mansion in Istanbul, Turkey

- Ragıp Paşa Köşkü
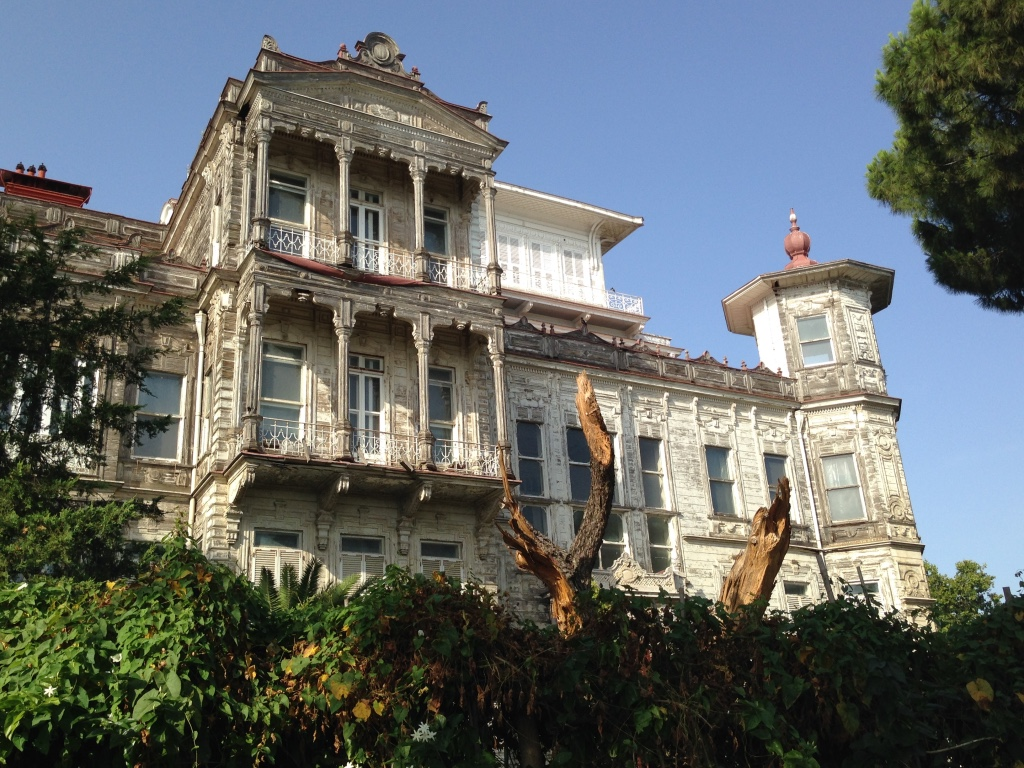
- Ragıp Pasha Mansion
- Interactive map of the Ragıp Pasha Mansion area

General information
- Location: Kadıköy, Cemil Topuzlu Ave, Caddebostan, Istanbul, Turkey
- Coordinates: 40.96360°N 29.05964°E
- Completed: 1906; 120 years ago

Technical details
- Floor count: 3

Design and construction
- Architect: August Carl Friedrich Jasmund

Ragip Pasha Mansion (Turkish: Ragıp Paşa Köşkü) is an Ottoman-era mansion in Istanbul, Turkey. It was built in 1906. The mansion is located in Caddebostan, Kadıköy.

== Background ==
Ragıp Sarica (1857–1920), known as Ragıp Pasha, was born in Euboea (Turkish: Eğriboz). After graduating from the School of Civil Service, he entered state service. He became an aide de camp to the Ottoman Sultan Abdulhamid II (r. 1876–1909) at the Yıldız Palace. Additionally, he was engaged in trade. He founded the rakı factory Umurca in Tekirdağ, and also funded the construction of the commercial buildings Afrika Han, Anadolu Han and Rumeli Han at İstiklal Avenue in Beyoğlu, Istanbul. He was exiled in 1908 to the island Rhodes in Ottoman Greece following the deposition of the sultan to Thessaloniki right after the Young Turk Revolution. He contracted stomach cancer there, and went to Switzerland for treatment. After his return, he lived in his mansion.

== Mansion ==
Ragıp Pasha Mansion is located at Cemil Topuzlu Avenue in the Caddebostan neighborhood of Kadıköy district in Istanbul, Turkey, on the shore of the Marmara Sea.

Built in 1906, its architect was Prussian August Carl Friedrich Jasmund, who taught at the Imperial School of Military Engineering (Ottoman Turkish: Mühendishâne-i Berrî-i Hümâyun, today Istanbul Technical University), and designed the Sirkeci railway station. It consists of three buildings, a luxurious one for Pasha, a relative modest one for Tevhide, Pasha's daughter, and a one-storey reception pavilion at the street side. Entry to the premises is through a high wrought-iron double-wing gate. The buildings cover a floor area of 3,406 m^{2} (36,660 sq ft) with a gross covered area of 2,700 m^{2} (29,000 sq ft) on a plot of 22,970 m^{2} (5.68 acres). The mansion's land is a registered protected area. The cost of the mansion was given with 40,000 gold. In later years, the pavilion was demolished, and apartment buildings were constructed on the site.

Both buildings have three stores and a basement. A clock tower was added to the building of Ragıp Pasha. There was an outbuilding and a pool, which were demolished during the construction of the coastal walkway in later years. The buildings are of masonry covered by wood except the basement. The windows and the balconies are covered with wooden blinds. The outside woodwork gives the buildings the appearance of a wooden house. Although the inner walls are flat, the wooden ceilings are richly decorated, especially with gold leaf handcrafted by Greek artisans. All the marble of the building was imported from Italy, and the interior flooring parquets from Vienna, Austria.

== After Pasha's death ==
After the death of Pasha in 1920, the mansion was sold. It was owned first by lawyer İbrahim Ali, then Sıtkı Çiftçi. It was used by the Sailing Club and then as a military jailhouse. Later, the mansion was leased by storewise. Notable people like Vehbi Koç and Abidin Dino were among the tenants. The mansion was later neglected. It was dubbed "Little Dolmabahçe Palace", "Palace Cub" or "Haunted House".

After the death of businessman Tahsin Çiftçi in 2000, his heirs Hakan Mehmet Çiftçi and Hatice Ayşe Çiftçi owned the mansion. Due to the Çiftçi family's financial problems, the mansion was in enforcement by a bank.

On 2 September 2022, the court of justice went out to tender, and the creditor İşbank purchased the mansion for around ₺449 million.

== See also ==
- Arif Sarıca Mansion (built 1903), the mansion of Pasha's brother Arif Sarıca in Moda, Kadıköy.
