= Marmara Municipalities Union =

- Marmara Belediyeler Birliği
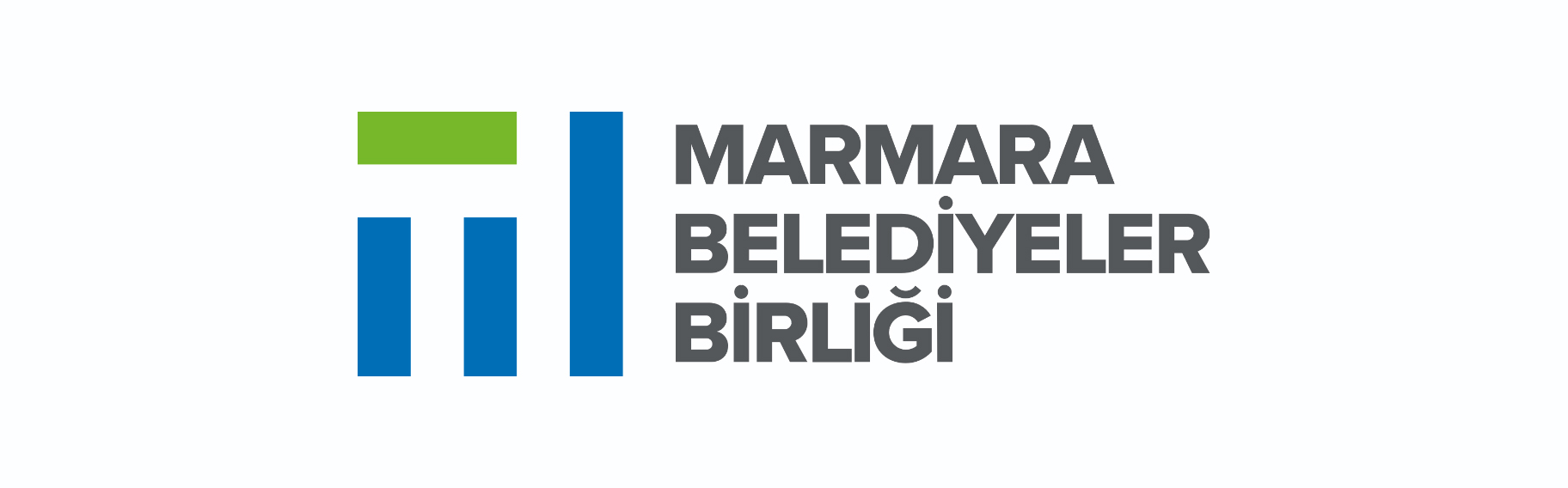
- Abbreviation: MBB
- Formation: 25 April 1975
- Location: Marmara region
- Website: https://marmara.gov.tr/en

The Marmara Municipalities Union (Turkish: Marmara Belediyeler Birliği; MBB) is a public institution formed in 1975 as a collaboration of municipalities in the Marmara region, Turkey. It works both locally and internationally with the mission of increasing the effectiveness of municipalities while addressing important problems arising from rapid changes in society and the world, and to research, raise awareness, share and support in this field. MBB works on projects related to urbanization, migration, social cohesion, local diplomacy, local economic development, resilience and innovation, and provides training, consultancy and organizes events in these areas.

== History ==
In 1973, 45 municipalities in the Marmara Region came together to find solutions for the Marmara Sea, which was polluted by the increasing industry in the Marmara region. In this meeting, it was agreed that regional problems could not be solved on a city-by-city basis and required cooperation. The participating municipalities decided to act jointly in order to adopt a democratic local government approach, to carry out central-local relations within the framework of democratic principles, to expand the scope of local governments and to find solutions to environmental problems. At the end of 2 years of work, Turkey's first regional scale union of municipalities was officially established on April 25, 1975, under the name of "Union of Municipalities of Marmara and Straits".

== Logo ==
The MBB logo consists of many lines of different sizes, each representing the coming together of municipalities of different scales, each with different advantages. The lines of the logo, just like the MBB member municipalities, move side by side, supporting each other in the direction of the same goal. The gaps between the lines emphasize the independent structure of the cities, while at the same time, these gaps that connect them represent cooperation and solidarity between the cities. All these lines and cities of different scales come together to form Marmara, MBB, M. If one of them is missing, M is also missing. The blue color of the logo represents water and the Marmara Sea, while the green color represents nature and symbolizes cities existing in harmony with nature.

== Organization structure ==
Union of Marmara Municipalities Building, Değirmen Han (illustration)

The organs of the Union consist of the Assembly, the Council and the President. The decision-making center is the Union Assembly, while the President is in charge of managing the Union and protecting its rights and interests. Its administration is the responsibility of the Secretary General appointed by the President. There are Directorates and Coordinatorships under the General Secretariat in its structure. There are five centers where units and institutions can carry out joint work and projects, an academy to provide training, and 11 Platforms where municipal employees come together to exchange knowledge and experience.

=== Academy ===
- Local Government Academy

=== Centers ===
- Center for Urban Policy
- Migration Policy Center
- Management Development Center
- Center for Sustainability and Climate Change
- Data and Technology Center

=== Platforms ===
- Information Technology Platform
- Environment Platform
- Audit Platform
- Migration Platform
- Law Platform
- Human Resources and Education Platform
- Corporate Communication Platform
- Culture and Art Platform
- Library and Information Centers Platform
- Financial Services Platform
- City Planning Platform
- Local Diplomacy Platform

== Marmara sea ==
The Marmara sea, which is the igniting force for the formation of the Union and for the municipalities to come together and work together for a common purpose, has a special place in MBB's work.

In the Marmara Region, which hosts more than 30% of Turkey's population, settlement density is higher on the coastlines. This rate of population growth increases the pollution pressure on the Marmara Sea, which is an inland sea, in the face of industrial activities and agricultural activities. Sea slobber, also known as mucilage, which is visible on the sea surface and also covers the depths, has emerged as a visible result of this pressure. Under the leadership of the Ministry of Environment, Urbanization and Climate Change, MBB, central government, local governments, non-governmental organizations, universities and other stakeholders came together and carried out studies to develop a common action plan. The 22-article action plan that emerged as a result of these studies continues to be implemented. The Integrated Strategic Plan for the Marmara Sea, which was decided to be made in the Marmara Sea Action Plan, has been published. According to Article AF6.2.2.2.12 of this Strategic Plan, the Union of Marmara Municipalities was assigned the task of organizing awareness activities for the Marmara Sea on June 8 every year. The first one was celebrated as Marmara Sea Day on June 8 as part of the Turkish Environment Week in 2022. Simultaneously 62 awareness activities were organized in 5 metropolitan and 2 provincial municipalities with coastal parts.

== Events and programs ==
MARUF

Marmara Urban Forum (MARUF) is an international forum where all stakeholders involved and playing a role in cities come together and make their voices heard. The forum, which is organized every two years, has set out with the motto "Solution Generating Cities". Beyond the presentation of problems, it has also made it its mission to propose a solution for each problem. The content of the forum has been prepared in parallel with the UN Sustainable Development Goals.

The Forum was first organized in Istanbul in 2019. In 2021, MARUF was organized online in partnership with UN-Habitat.

Golden Ant

Golden Ant, where good practice projects of MBB member municipalities are awarded, provides an environment for the announcement and dissemination of these projects and for municipalities to learn from each other.

Mentor

The Mentor - Exchange and Sharing Program was initiated to improve the capacity and increase the competencies of the employees of MBB's member municipalities. In the exchange program, where inter-institutional cooperation is at the forefront, municipalities from local governments in the region, in Turkey and even abroad that offer and request expertise on the topics needed come together in online meetings.

=== Cultural publications ===
MBB Kültür Yayınları, which specializes in the field of local governments, continues to focus on publishing books that will be a reference source. With its approach away from popular publishing, it includes books on local governments published by experts in the field. It also has related publications such as Mukaddime, Encyclopedic City Dictionary, Architect Sinan of Marmara.
