= Baghdad Street (Dubai) =

Emirati road

- Baghdad Street in Dubai, April 2022
- Native name: شارع بغداد (Arabic)
- Owner: Roads and Transport Authority, Dubai
- Location: Dubai, United Arab Emirates
- Coordinates: 25°16′34″N 55°23′14″E

Baghdad Street (Arabic: شارع بغداد) is a 2.3 km road in Dubai, United Arab Emirates. Named after the Iraqi capital city of Baghdad, it branches out from al-Ittihad Road in al-Nahda neighborhood and runs through al-Qusais and Muhaisnah neighborhoods before connecting Sheikh Mohammed bin Zayed Road from the other end. It is overseen by the city's Roads and Transport Authority. In 2009, the General Directorate of Traffic reported that the street accounted for the second-most instances of pedestrian crossing violations.
