= Football rivalries in Turkey =

This is a list of the main association football rivalries in Turkey.

== "Eternal derbies" ==
These derbies are between the clubs that have never been relegated from the Süper Lig for more than ten seasons as of 2026. This table excludes Alanyaspor, the least prominent in top-flight presence among such clubs.

Teams	Name	Notes
Fenerbahçe vs. Galatasaray	Intercontinental Derby	
Beşiktaş vs. Fenerbahçe	Beşiktaş–Fenerbahçe rivalry	
Beşiktaş vs. Galatasaray	Beşiktaş–Galatasaray rivalry	
Trabzonspor vs. Beşiktaş/Fenerbahçe/Galatasaray	Trabzonspor–Istanbul rivalries	As the most decorated football team outside Istanbul, Trabzonspor, hailing from the province of Trabzon, has rivalries with three Istanbulite clubs, Beşiktaş, Fenerbahçe and Galatasaray, however Fenerbahçe - Trabzonspor rivalry is the fiercest.

=== Women's derbies ===
Teams	Name	Notes
Fenerbahçe vs. Galatasaray	Intercontinental Derby	

== City derbies ==
=== Istanbul (excluding "eternal derbies") ===
Teams	Name
Kasımpaşa SK vs. Fatih Karagümrük	Golden Horn derby
Galatasaray vs. Kasımpaşa	Beyoğlu derby
Kartalspor vs. Pendikspor	East Istanbul derby

=== Ankara ===
Teams	Name
Gençlerbirliği vs. Ankaragücü	Ankara derby

=== İzmir ===
Teams	Name
Göztepe vs. Karşıyaka	Big Izmir rivalry
Göztepe vs. Altay	Capital derby
Karşıyaka vs. Altay	Old derby
Karşıyaka vs. Bucaspor	Outskirts derby

=== Adana ===
Teams	Name
Adanaspor vs. Adana Demirspor	Adana derby

== Provincial derbies ==
Teams	Province
Alanyaspor vs. Antalyaspor	Antalya
Aydınspor vs. Nazilli Belediyespor	Aydın
Balıkesirspor vs. Bandırmaspor	Balıkesir
Kocaelispor vs. Gebzespor	Kocaeli
Akhisar Belediyespor vs. Turgutluspor	Manisa
Mersin İdman Yurdu vs. Tarsus İdman Yurdu	Mersin

== Regional derbies ==
Teams	Name	Region
Trabzonspor vs Samsunspor	Old derby	Black Sea Region
Trabzonspor vs Çaykur Rizespor	Eastern Black Sea derby	Black Sea Region
Orduspor vs Giresunspor	Western Black Sea derby	Black Sea Region
Kayserispor vs Sivasspor	Central Anatolia Derby	Central Anatolia Region
Mersin İdman Yurdu vs Adanaspor	Çukurova derby	Çukurova
Mersin İdman Yurdu vs. Adana Demirspor	Çukurova derby	Çukurova
Malatyaspor vs Elazığspor	East derby	Eastern Anatolia region
Elazığspor vs Diyarbakırspor	East derby	Eastern Anatolia region
Malatyaspor vs Diyarbakırspor	East derby	Eastern Anatolia region
Bursaspor vs Eskişehirspor	Marmara derby	Marmara region
Kocaelispor vs Sakaryaspor	Marmara derby	Marmara region
Edirnespor vs Tekirdağspor	Thrace derby	Thrace

== Non-geographic rivalries ==
- Galatasaray vs. Çaykur Rizespor
- Beşiktaş vs. Bursaspor
- Beşiktaş vs. Göztepe
- Beşiktaş vs. Ankaragücü

== Other ==
Rakı vs. wine derby: A football match between workers of TEKEL rakı and wine factories located at Bayraklı district of Izmir.
