= Göztepe, Kadıköy =

Göztepe
- Neighbourhood
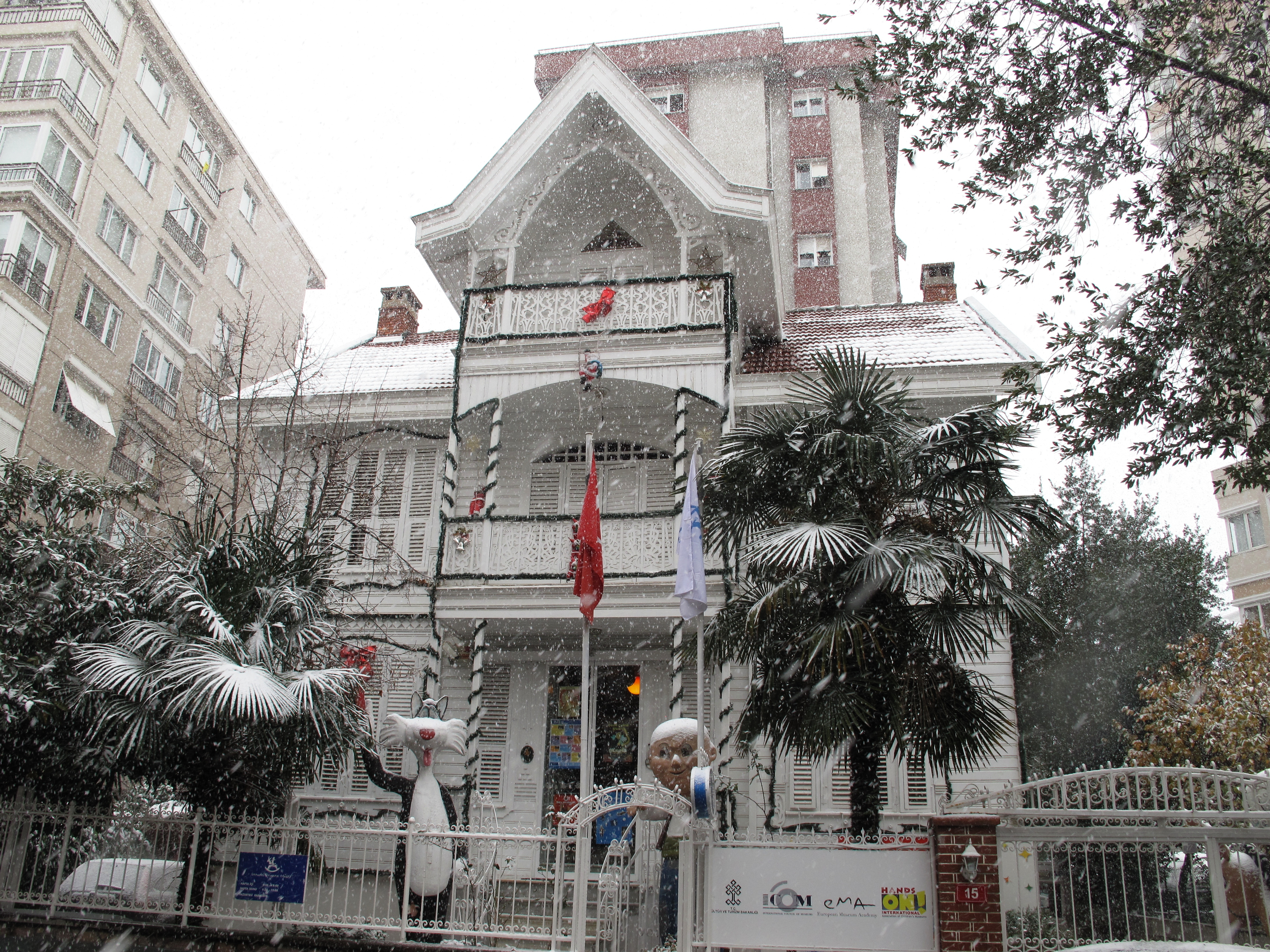
- Istanbul Toy Museum

- Göztepe inside Kadıköy

- Location within Turkey Location within Istanbul
- Coordinates: 40°58′43″N 29°04′00″E
- Country: Turkey
- Province: Istanbul
- District: Kadıköy
- Population (2022): 40,858
- Time zone: UTC+3 (TRT)
- Postal code: 34730
- Area code: 0216

Göztepe is a neighbourhood in the municipality and district of Kadıköy, Istanbul Province, Turkey. Its population is 40,858 (2022). The name, literally meaning "eye hill" in English, was coined to honor Gözcü Baba ("Father Watchman"), the nickname of the watchman of a dervish lodge situated on a hill there.

The neighborhood on the Asian part of Istanbul is bordered in the south by Caddebostan and Fenerbahçe, in the north by Merdivenköy, in the east by Erenköy and in the west by Feneryolu. It does not have a coast.

The notable high street of the Asian part of Istanbul, Baghdad Avenue, runs through the quarter. Göztepe's city park is the largest green space along the Avenue, covering 10,000 m^{2} (2.5 acres).

== History ==
The neighborhood developed as a residential area for high court officials in late Ottoman times during the reign of Sultan Abdul Hamid II (1876–1909). Wealthy Levantines and other non-Muslims settled on Its western side. Wooden mansions within lavish gardens were built in and around Göztepe. The suburb also contained farms and dairies, which supplied the court with their products.

In the first half of the 20th century, the area was mainly populated as a summer resort. While many of the historic wooden mansions gave way to modern buildings following fires, a small number still exist.

After the construction of the D.100 highway which passes through the north of Göztepe, the neighborhood spread into the meadows in that direction.

Göztepe railway station opened after the establishment of the Baghdad Railway, and contributed to further settlement in the area. It became redundant with the opening of the Marmaray rail service which uses a more modern Göztepe station.

== Education ==
- Göztepe İhsan Kurşunoğlu Anadolu High School
- Erenköy Girls High School
- Yeşilbahar Middle School (Closed)
- Göztepe Elementary School
- İlhami Ahmed Örnekal Elementary School
- Fenerbahçe Anadolu High School
- Kadıköy Göztepe Mesleki ve Teknik Anadolu High School
- Faik Reşit Unat Middle School
- Ali Haydar Ersoy Middle School
- İstanbul Avni Akyol Fine Arts High School
- Kadıköy Bilim ve Sanat Merkezi

== Places of interest ==
- Istanbul Toy Museum founded and run by poet and writer Sunay Akın.
- Göztepe railway station
- Selamiçeşme Özgürlük Park
- Göztepe 60. Year Park (located inside the borders of Caddebostan but colloquially perceived to be in Göztepe)
- Göztepe Marketplace (Göztepe Sabit Pazarı)
- Tütüncü Mehmet Efendi Mosque
- Caddebostan Synagogue
- Göztepe Sports Facilities
- Hilal S.K.
- Erenköy fire station

== Transport ==
- Göztepe railway station
- GZ1 Public transport bus service
- GZ2 Public transport bus service
- M4 Kadıköy-Sabiha Gökçen International Airport
