= Erenköy, Kadıköy =

Neighborhood in Istanbul

Erenköy
- Neighbourhood
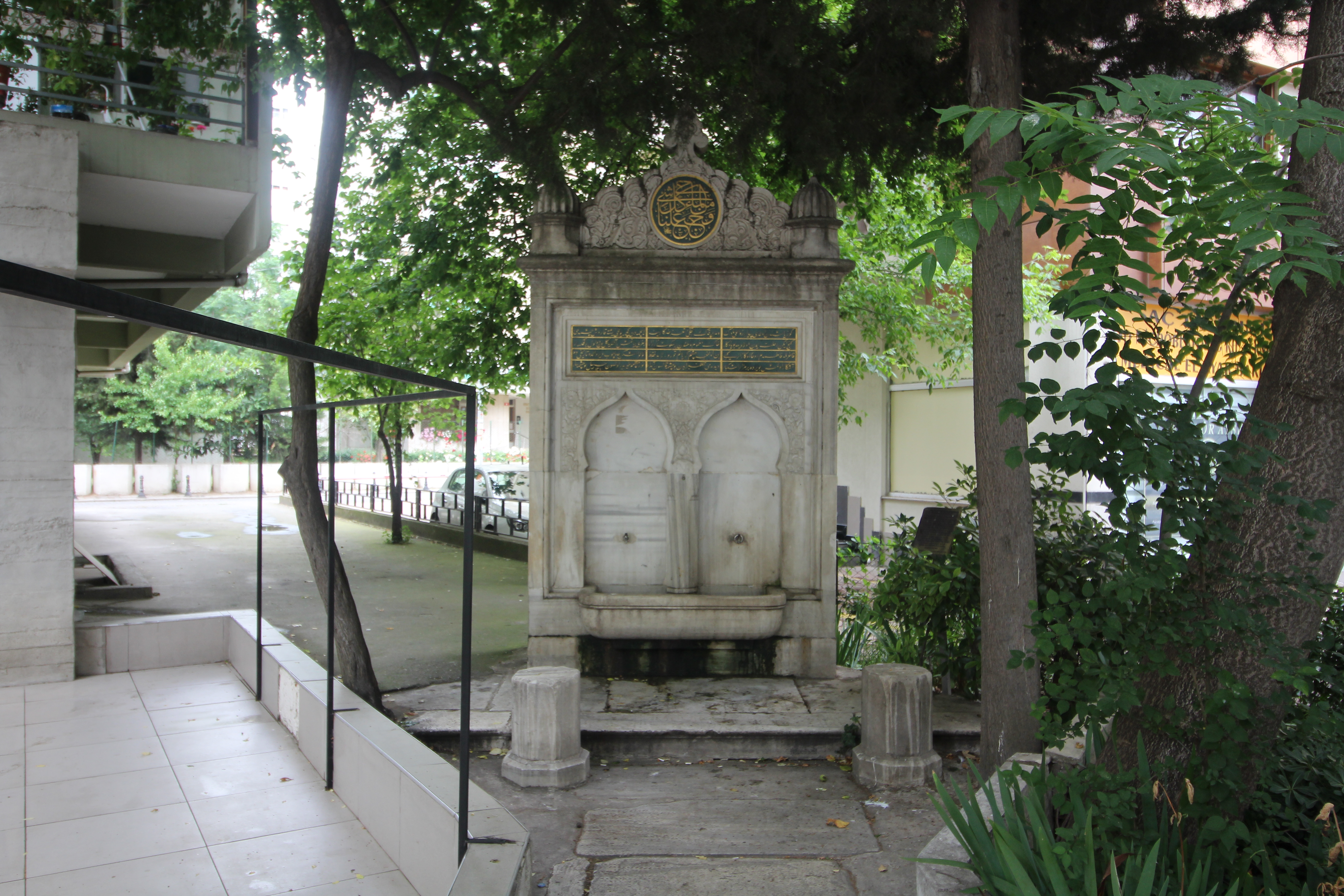
- Erenköy Station Fountain

- Location within Turkey Location within Istanbul
- Coordinates: 40°58′20″N 29°04′33″E
- Country: Turkey
- Province: İstanbul
- District: Kadıköy
- Area: 1.351 km^{2} (0.522 sq mi)
- Population (2023): 34,684
  - Density: 25,670/km^{2} (66,490/sq mi)
- Time zone: UTC+3 (TRT)
- Postal code: 34738

Erenköy is a neighbourhood in the Kadıköy district inside of Istanbul, Turkey. The population of Erenköy is 34,684 (2023). The area of the neighbourhood is 1.351 km^{2} (0.522 sq mi). The main axis and commercial center of the neighbourhood is the Ethem Efendi Avenue. The neighbourhood consists the Erenköy Girls High School, which is the only girls school in Istanbul.

It is bordered by Göztepe to the west, Caddebostan and Suadiye to the south, and Sahrayıcedit and 19 Mayıs neighborhoods to the north.

== History ==
Although the history of Erenköy can be traced back to prehistoric times, its known history as a settlement begins in the 14th century. In 1331, Konuralp, one of the commanders of Orhan Gazi, conquered the western foothills of Kayışdağı and the area that is now known as İçerenköy. Guided by the followers of Geyikli Baba, a warrior dervish and disciple of Konuralp, settlers arrived in the region and established themselves primarily in the Erenköy-Göztepe area, especially around Merdivenköy. The first settlement, founded in 1335 under the name Tekkebağ Village, was governed by Eren Baba and Ali Gazi. After 1465, the area began to be referred to as “Erenköy” in land registry records, deriving its name from Eren Baba.

In 1872, when the Haydarpaşa-İzmit railway was extended to Bostancı through the Tellikavak area, a new station was built, and the surrounding area began to be called "Erenköy." The original settlement, which was located further inland relative to the new station, started to be referred to as "İçerenköy" (meaning “Inner Erenköy”).

In the early years of the Republic, Erenköy maintained its identity as a summer retreat for the influential and wealthy elite, as well as for prominent Levantine families. According to the 1934 city directory, Erenköy Neighborhood actually encompassed seven settlements: Erenköy, Bostancı, Suadiye, Caddebostan, Sahrayıcedit, Göztepe, and Merdivenköy. From 1930 to 1967, Erenköy, along with Kızıltoprak, remained one of the two subdistricts of Kadıköy. In 1967, Erenköy was officially incorporated into the Kadıköy district, and in 1974, it acquired its current neighborhood boundaries.

== Travel ==
There are multiple bus lines that go through, or go to Erenköy which are:

- ER1 Kadıköy - Erenköy bus
- ER2 Kadıköy - Erenköy bus
- 17 Kadıköy - Pendik bus
- 2 Üsküdar - Bostancı bus

Erenköy has a railway station on the Marmaray, the Erenköy railway station.
