= 19 Mayıs, Kadıköy =

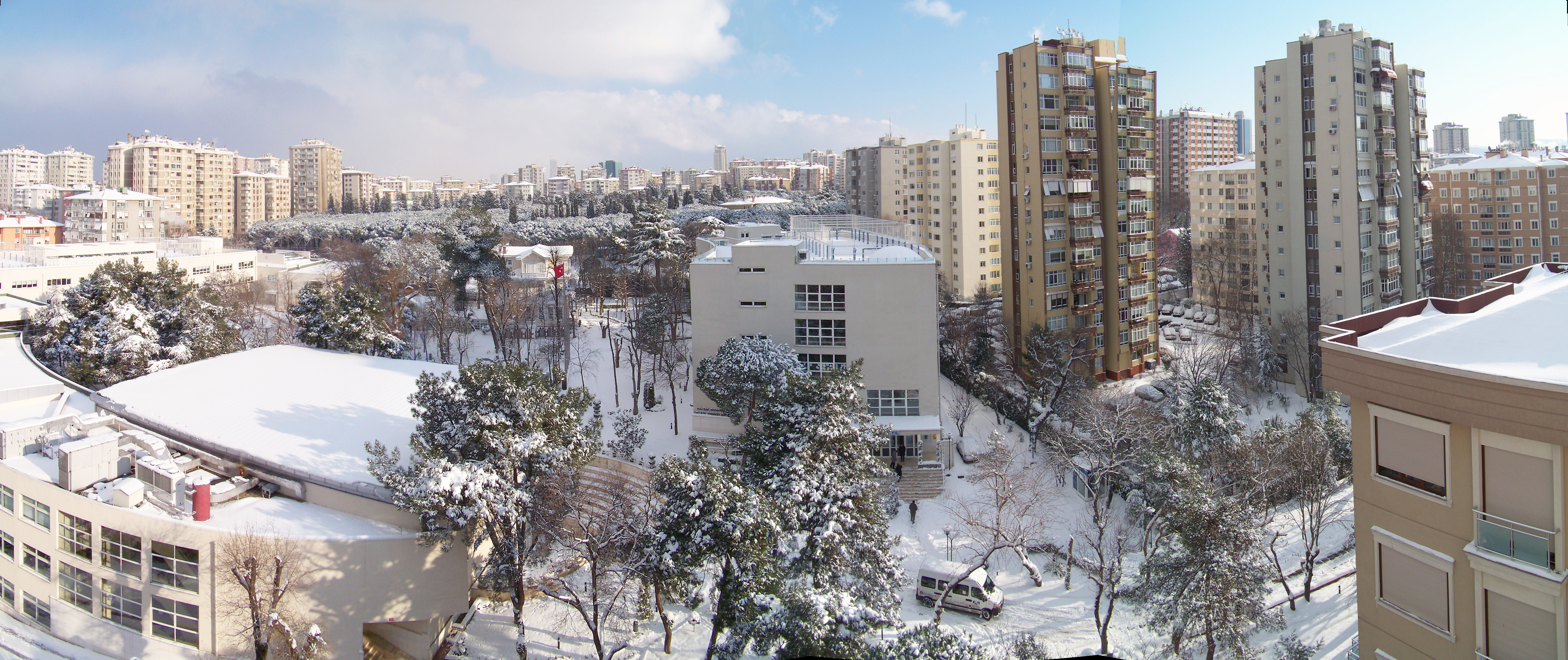
19 Mayıs neighborhood, looking toward Erenköy Mental and Nervous Diseases Training and Research Hospital

19 Mayıs is a neighborhood in the district of Kadıköy, Istanbul, Turkey. It is a fast developing neighborhood, full of large apartment blocks. Its population is 32,164 (2020). It is bordered by the Sahrayıcedit neighborhood on the north and northwest, by the D.100 highway and the Ataşehir district on the northeast, by the Kozyatağı neighborhood on the southeast, and by the Suadiye and Erenkoy neighborhoods on the southwest. The neighborhood is named for May 19 (Turkish: Ondokuz Mayıs), the day generally considered the beginning of the Turkish War of Independence and now celebrated as Commemoration of Atatürk, Youth and Sports Day.

== Institutions ==
Religious institutions include the Haserenler Mosque, the Mustafa Nazmi Ersin Mosque, and the Kazasker Mosque. Schools include Çevre College and the Erenköy Campus of the FMV Işık Schools. Hospitals include the Erenköy Mental and Nervous Diseases Training and Research Hospital, the Erenköy Physical Therapy and Rehabilitation Hospital, and the Acıbadem Kozyatağı Hospital. The neighborhood's largest park is the Kriton Curi Park.

== Historic sites ==
Several historic mansions (köşk) remain standing in neighborhood, including the Reşat Paşa Mansion, the Kabasakal Mehmet Paşa or Gezeryan Mansion, and the Mühürdar Fuat Paşa Mansion.

The grounds of the Erenköy Physical Therapy and Rehabilitation Hospital include the Ziya Paşa Mansion. The grounds of the Erenköy Mental and Nervous Diseases Training and Research Hospital included three wooden mansions when it opened in 1932. Of these, the Central Pavilion (pavyon) was demolished in 1968 to make way for the Akbaytugan Service building, while the Women's Pavilion is still standing, but in a dilapidated state. The grounds of the Erenköy FMV Işık Schools include the Ragıp and Nezahet Nurettin Eğe mansion.

The Zihni Paşa Mansion, also known as the Ziverbey Mansion, was used by the Turkish National Intelligence Organization (MİT) and by Counter-Guerrilla (Kontrgerilla) for interrogations after the 1971 military intervention. The mansion was later demolished. Nearby is the Memorial of Respect for Victims of Torture (İşkence Mağdurlarına Saygı Anıtı), a 2013 sculpture by Rahmi Aksungur.
