= Kriton Curi =

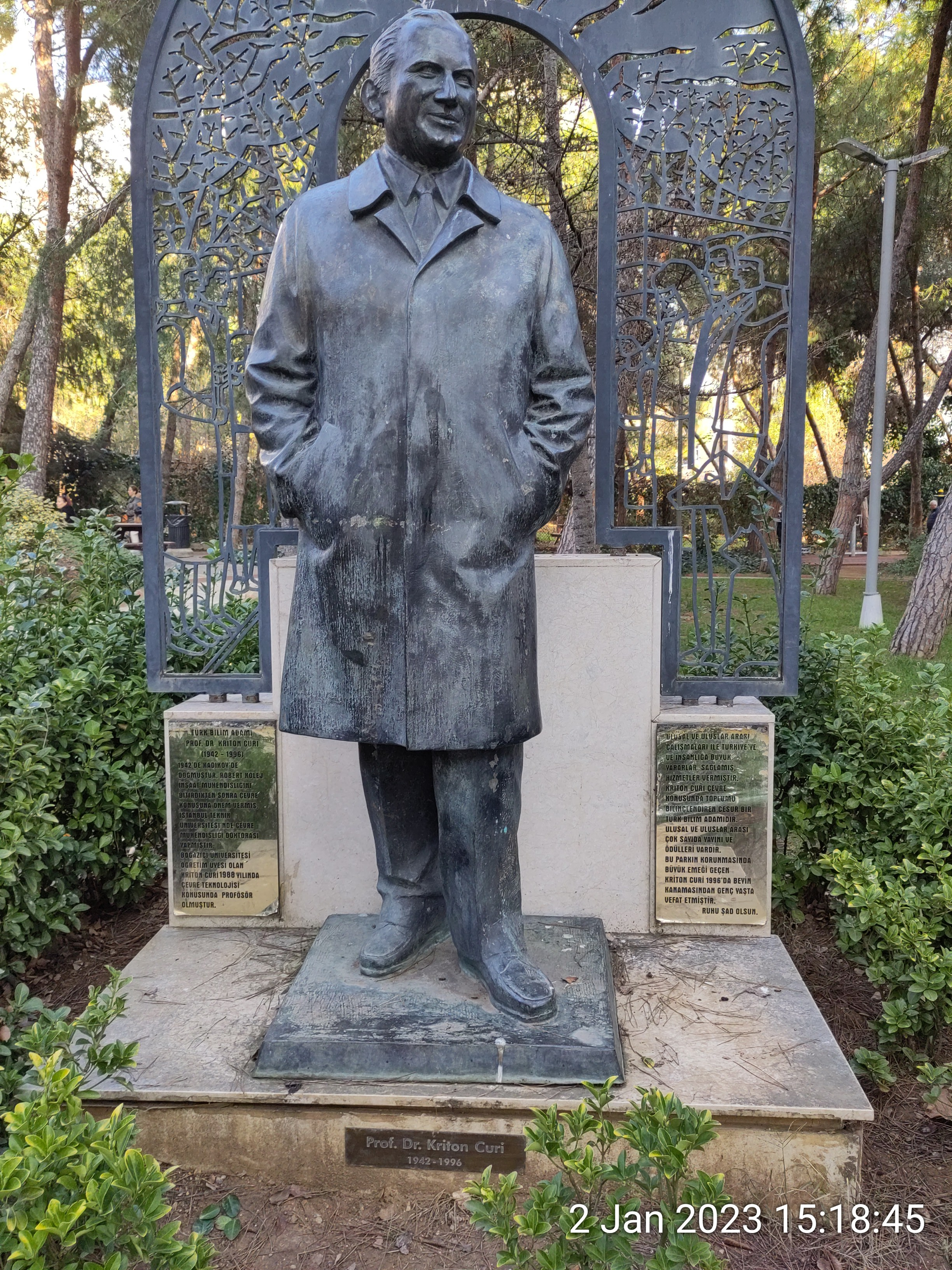
Statue of Kriton Curi

Kriton Curi (1942 – 21 October 1996) was an environmentalist and professor of civil engineering in Turkey.

== Early life and education ==
Curi was born in Kadıköy, Istanbul, in 1942. He graduated from the Zoğrafyon Greek High School. He then earned a bachelor's degree in civil engineering from Robert College in 1966, a master's degree in environmental science from Robert College in 1968, and a doctorate in environmental engineering from Istanbul Technical University in 1974.

== Career ==
He became a faculty member of the Department of Civil Engineering at Boğaziçi University also in 1974. He was promoted to associate professor (doçent) in 1980 and to Professor of Environmental Technology in 1988. Curi was director of Boğaziçi's Environmental Sciences Institute from 1993 to 1996.

Curi organized 33 Turkish and international academic symposia. He published more than 100 articles in academic journals and conference proceedings. He also authored or edited 17 books. He received several awards, including the Boğaziçi University Rector's Honor Award (1981), the Araştırma ve Eğitim Vakfı (Research and Education Foundation) Science Award (1984), the Ministry of the Environment Award (1992), the Roy F. Weston Award (1996), and the Doğa Savaşcıları (Nature Warriors) Award (1997). He was an advisor to the World Health Organization (WHO), head of the Environment Work Group of the Turkish Industry and Business Association (TÜSİAD), and head of the Turkish National Committee on Solid Wastes. He sometimes referred to himself as the "garbage professor."

Curi suffered a brain hemorrhage while on a plane from Brussels to Istanbul. The plane made an emergency landing, but he died age 54 in Budapest (or possibly Warsaw) on October 21, 1996. He was buried in the Kadıköy Greek Orthodox Cemetery.

== Legacy ==
Curi is remembered for his efforts to raise environmental awareness.

The following are named after Curi:

- the Kriton Curi Environmental Foundation
- Kriton Curi Park, a park in the 19 Mayıs neighborhood on the Anatolian side of Istanbul (in the early 1960s Curi planted the pine trees in the space that was officially made into a park in 1998)
- Kriton Curi Hall, a lecture hall at Boğaziçi University
- the Prof. Dr. Kriton Curi Environment Awards
