= Emmanuel Adamakis =

Greek Orthodox bishop and theologian (born 1958)

His Eminence Emmanuel
- Metropolitan of Chalcedon
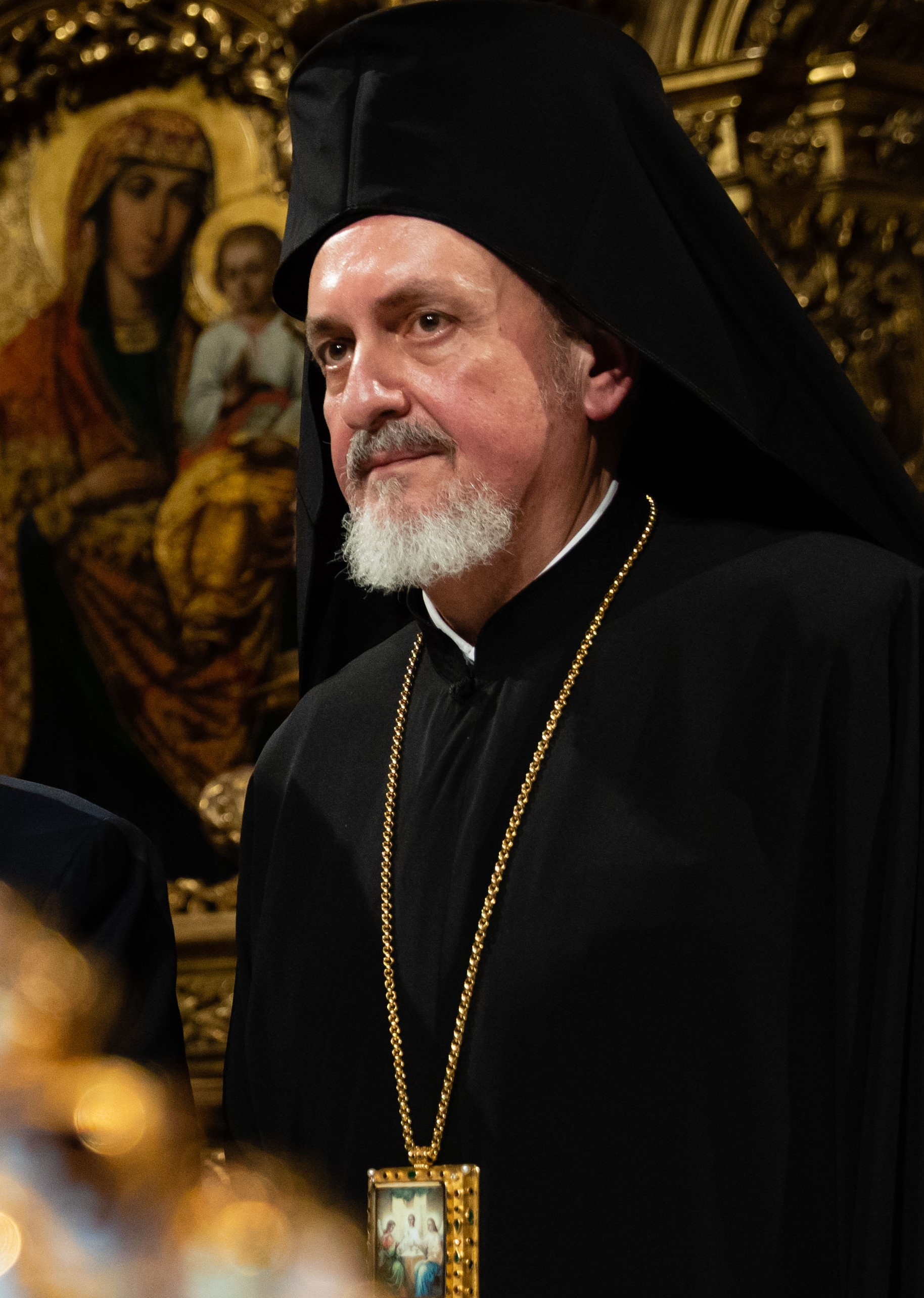
- Church: Ecumenical Patriarchate of Constantinople
- See: Chalcedon
- Installed: 20 March 2021
- Predecessor: Athanasios (Papas)
- Previous posts: Bishop of Reghion (1996–2003); Metropolitan of France (2003–2021)

Orders
- Ordination: 1985
- Consecration: 1996

Personal details
- Born: Emmanuel Adamakis; 19 December 1958 (age 67) Agios Nikolaos, Crete, Greece
- Denomination: Eastern Orthodox Christianity

Metropolitan Emmanuel (Greek: Μητροπολιτικός Εμμανουήλ; born December 19, 1958 as Emmanuel Adamakis, Greek: Εμμανουήλ Αδαμάκης) is an Eastern Orthodox bishop of the Ecumenical Patriarchate of Constantinople.

He served as the Orthodox Metropolitan of France from January 20, 2003, to March 20, 2021. Additionally, he was the president of the Conference of European Churches from 2009 to 2013 and the president of the Assembly of Orthodox Bishops of France.

Since his departure from Paris, he has been the Metropolitan of Chalcedon under Bartholomew I of Constantinople.

== Biography ==
=== Early life and education ===
Emmanuel Adamakis was born on December 19, 1958, in Agios Nikolaos, Crete. After completing his studies at the Normal School of Heraklion, he pursued higher education at the Faculty of Letters of the Catholic Institute of Paris and at the Saint-Serge Institute. He furthered his studies in the history of religions at the University of Paris IV and the Institute of Ecumenical Studies. In 1985, he was ordained as a deacon and priest. He continued his studies at the Holy Cross Orthodox School of Theology in Boston, Massachusetts, earning a master's degree in theology in 1987.

=== Ecclesiastical life ===
Subsequently, he was appointed as the vicar general of the Metropolis of Belgium while serving as the rector of the Archangels Michael and Gabriel parish in Brussels. He assumed the leadership of the Orthodox Church's office with the European Union from its inception in 1995. On September 5, 1996, he was unanimously elected bishop of the Diocese of Reggio and appointed auxiliary bishop to the Metropolitan of Belgium.

On January 20, 2003, he was unanimously elected by the Holy Synod of the Ecumenical Patriarchate as the Metropolitan of France. He was entrusted with representing the Patriarchate in theological dialogue with the Oriental Orthodox Churches. He retained the leadership of the Orthodox Church's representation to the EU and was responsible for academic dialogue with Islam and Judaism. He also served as the president of the Conference of European Churches from 2009 to 2013.

In 2014, he co-authored a book with Roman Catholic cardinal Kurt Koch titled L'Esprit de Jérusalem. While serving as the Greek Orthodox Metropolitan of France, he was consulted by the French Senate in the drafting of certain laws related to religions. He also actively participated in the "Orthodoxie" program organized by France Culture and made appearances on various other broadcasts.

On March 20, 2021, he stepped down from his position as the Metropolitan of France and was appointed as the Metropolitan of Chalcedon under Bartholomew I of Constantinople. He was replaced in the French Metropolis by Archbishop Dimitrios (Ploumis).

== Works ==
- L'Esprit de Jérusalem, 2014, éditions du Cerf, Paris, co-written with Kurt Koch
