= Dimitrios Ploumis =

His Eminence Dimitrios
- Archbishop of France, Exarch of Europe
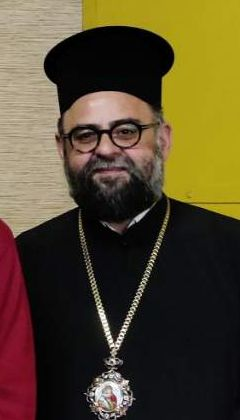
- Church: Ecumenical Patriarchate of Constantinople
- Archdiocese: Greek Orthodox Metropolis of France
- See: Paris
- Elected: 20 July 2021
- Installed: 18 September 2021
- Predecessor: Emmanuel (Adamakis)

Orders
- Consecration: 25 July 2021 by Bartholomew I of Constantinople

Personal details
- Born: Dimitrios Ploumis; 6 November 1979 (age 47) Thessaloniki
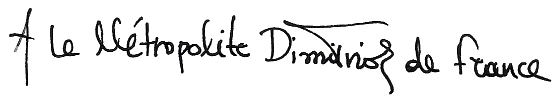
- Signature: Dimitrios's signature

Archbishop Dimitrios (in Greek: Δημήτριος Πλουμής) (6 November 1979, Thessaloniki) is a theologian, bishop of the Ecumenical Patriarchate and finally Archbishop of France from 2021 onwards.

He presides over the Assembly of Orthodox Bishops of France, the coordinating body for the Orthodox faithful in France.

== Early life and education ==
He was born in Thessaloniki in 1979. He graduated from the Ecclesiastical School of Thessaloniki and from the Department of Theology of the Theological school of the Aristotle University of Thessaloniki. In 2001 he was ordained deacon and in 2007 he became priestly leader of the Church of Saint Paraskeva in Xirokrini, Thessaloniki. From 2007 to 2015, he took charge of the Church of the Exaltation of the Holy Cross in Oraiokastro, in the Metropolis of Neapolis and Stavroupolis. At the invitation of Metropolitan Emmanuel of France, he directed the Orthodox Church of Marseille and then became hierarchical commissioner of the South of France. He participated in the Commissions for inter-Christian dialogue and inter-religious relations, representing the Metropolis of France and the Ecumenical Patriarchate.

== As Metropolitan of France ==
On 20 July 2021, he was elected by the Holy Synod of the Ecumenical Patriarchate as Metropolitan of France, he was consecrated by the Ecumenical Patriarch Bartholomew I on the 25th of the same month in the patriarchal cathedral Saint-George at Phanar and he was enthroned on Saturday 18 September 2021 in the Saint-Étienne cathedral in Paris.

In April 2022, during the 2022 French presidential election, he joined a message from Secours Catholique calling not to support the candidacy of the far-right politician Marine Le Pen.

In September 2022, he created an internal commission of inquiry following the revelation of facts of sexual assault on minors and child sexual abuse in a monastery under his jurisdiction during the 1970s. The prelate noted that the perpetrators of the crimes were deceased and the facts prescribed but expressed to the victims his "deep horror at the horrors suffered and the suffering endured since". He offered them, if they wished, to meet him. He stated that those responsible had dishonored their office.

On 22 February 2023, he was supposed to dine, in the company of sixteen other religious leaders as well as philosophers, with French President Emmanuel Macron, to discuss the question of euthanasia. The dinner was postponed to 9 March 2023, and took place on that date. Another dinner on the same question was organized at the beginning of 2024.

On 21 April 2023, he joined the Bishop of Nanterre, Matthieu Rougé, in expressing their wish for the celebration of Easter to be held on the same day for Catholics and Orthodox Christians, to demonstrate the unity of Christians.

He participated in the work "Religions et fin de vie : les témoignages des grandes voix religieuses." In early November 2023, amid tensions following the Gaza war, he took a stance against antisemitism. In this context, he met the Chief Rabbi of France Haïm Korsia and he visited the Grand Mosque of Paris to meet with the rector, Chems-Eddine Hafiz.

== Notes and references ==
Eastern Orthodox Church titles
Preceded by Emmanuel (Adamakis)	Metropolitan of France; 2020 – present	Succeeded by Incumbent
