= Greek Orthodox Metropolis of France =

Orthodox
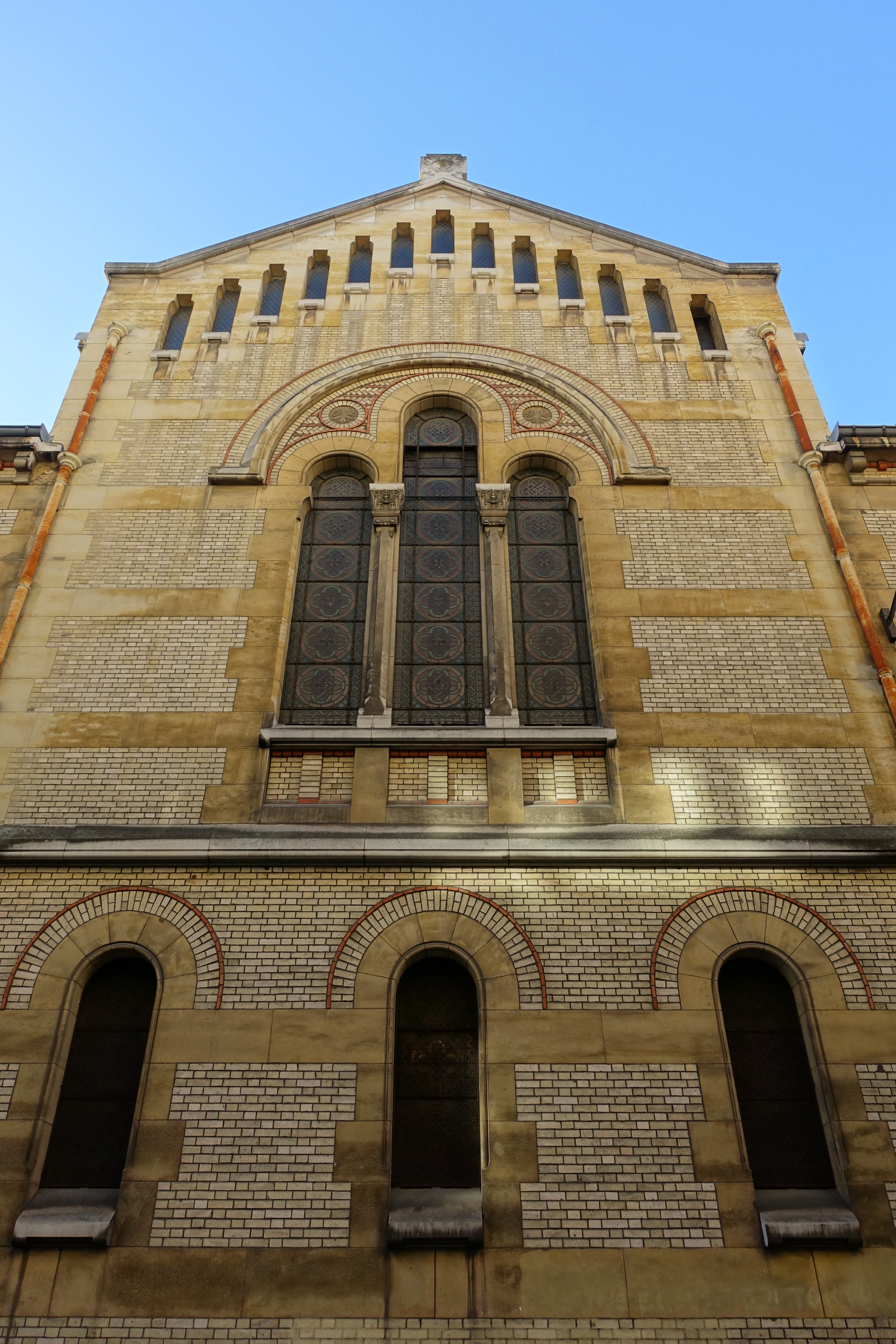
- St. Stephen's Cathedral, Paris

Location
- Territory: France
- Headquarters: Paris

Statistics
- Parishes: c. 60

Information
- Denomination: Eastern Orthodox
- Rite: Byzantine; Music: Byzantine chant, Russian chant Calendar: Revised Julian, Julian
- Established: 1963
- Language: Greek, French, Russian

Current leadership
- Parent church: Ecumenical Patriarchate of Constantinople
- Governance: Episcopal polity
- Patriarch: Bartholomew I of Constantinople
- Metropolitan: Dimitrios (Ploumis)

Website
- mgro.fr

The Metropolis of France, or the Greek Orthodox Metropolis of France (French: Métropole grecque orthodoxe de France, Greek: Μητρόπολη Γαλλίας, romanized: Mitropoli Gallias) is a metropolitan diocese of the Ecumenical Patriarchate of Constantinople established in 1963. It comprises the Eastern Orthodox parishes and monasteries in France.

Historically, its congregation mainly consisted of people of Greek descent, but following the disestablishment of the Paris-based Patriarchal Exarchate for Orthodox Parishes of the Russian Tradition in Western Europe within the jurisdiction of the Ecumenical Patriarchate in November 2018, a significant number of the parishes of the former Exarchate have joined the Metropolis while retaining their Russian liturgical tradition.

== History and organisation ==
The diocese was established on 5 February 1963 and at the time comprised the Greek Orthodox parishes in France, Belgium, Luxembourg, Spain, and Portugal. Metropolitan Meletios Karabinis (1914–1993) was appointed as its primate on 22 October 1963 and remained in charge of the Metropolis until his resignation for health reasons on 9 June 1988.

In August 1969, the Greek parishes in Belgium and Luxemburg were incorporated into a newly established Metropolis of Belgium. Likewise, in 2003 the parishes in Spain and Portugal were incorporated into the Metropolis of Spain and Portugal.

Metropolitan Emmanuel Adamakis has been in charge of the Metropolis since 20 January 2003.

The diocese currently has two assistant bishops: Irineos Avramidis and Maxim Paphilis.

=== Vicariate of Russian tradition of the Metropolis of France ===
In November 2019, it was officially re-affirmed that the parishes and communities, formerly in the jurisdiction the disbanded Exarchate of the Russian Orthodox churches in Western Europe (the Ecumenical Patriarchate), which had joined the Metropolis of France, would be grouped into the "vicariate of Russian tradition of the Metropolis of France" in January 2020.

== Primates ==
- Mélétios (Karabinis) (22 October 1963 – 9 June 1988)
- Jérémie (Calligiorgis) (9 June 1988 – 20 January 2003)
- Emmanuel Adamakis (20 January 2003 – 16 February 2021)
- Dimitrios (Ploumis) (since 25 July 2021)

== Structure ==
The metropolis is organized in three geographical entities:

- the Northern Episcopal Vicariate (Paris)
- the Central Episcopal Vicariate (Lyon)
- the Southern Episcopal Vicariate (Marseille)

== See also ==
- Assembly of Canonical Orthodox Bishops of France
- Greeks in France
