= Böcekli Mosque =

Mosque in Kadıköy, Istanbul

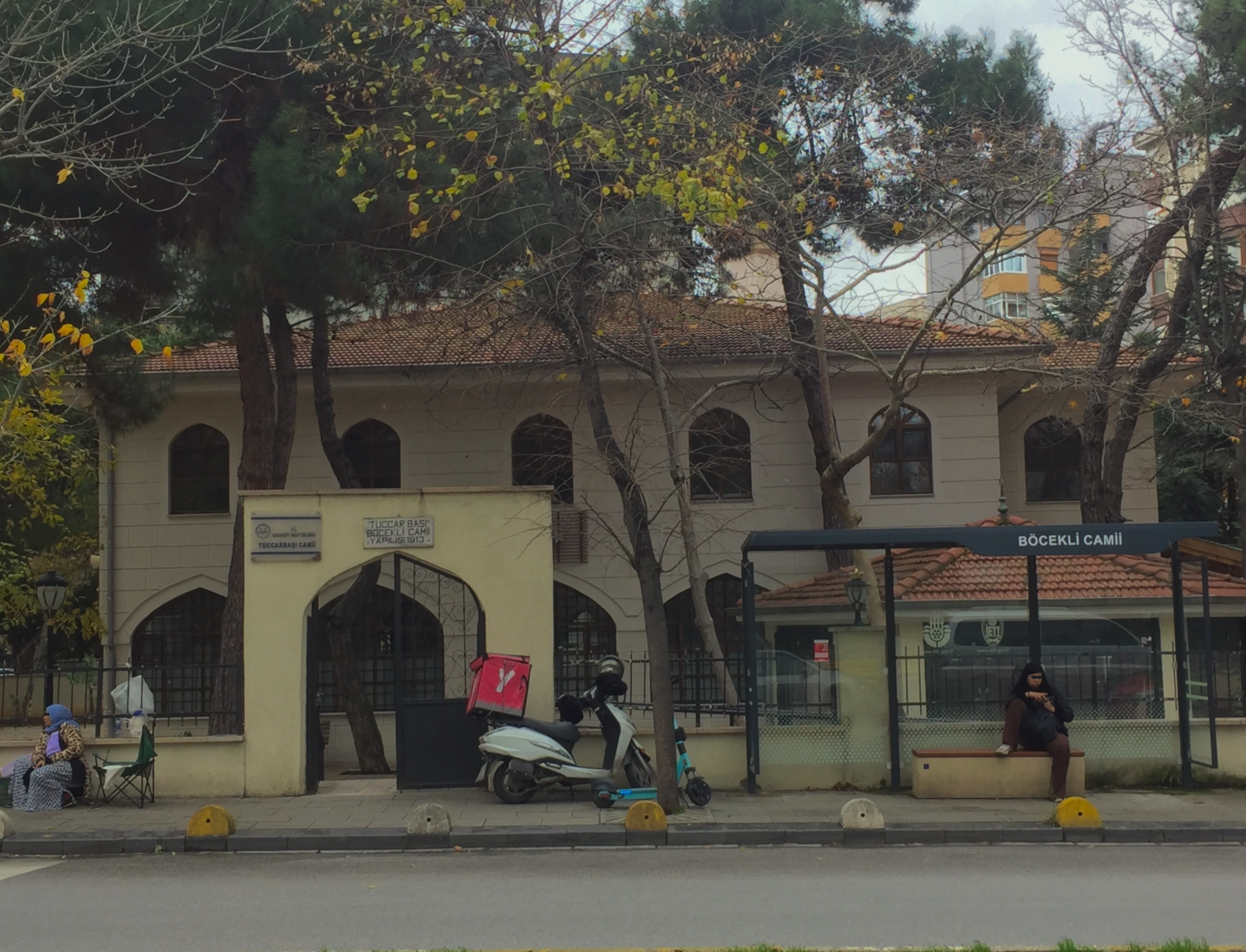

- Location within Istanbul

Religion
- Affiliation: Islam

Location
- Municipality: Istanbul
- Country: Turkey
- Interactive map of Böcekli Mosque
- Coordinates: 40°58′42″N 29°05′04″E

Architecture
- Type: mosque
- Completed: 1913

The Böcekli Mosque or Tüccarbaşı Böcekli Mosque is a mosque in the Tüccarbaşı area of Sahrayıcedit, Kadıköy, Istanbul, Turkey.

== Description ==
The mosque was built in 1913 by a silkworm (Turkish: böcek, literally, "bug") breeder named Fatma Zehra.

The mosque is constructed of cut stone on a rectangular plan with a wooden dome-like ceiling over the central area and a single minaret. The interior is decorated with multicolored floral, vegetal, and geometric motifs. One of its calligraphic works is listed as stolen.

The grave of Fatma Zehra is in the garden of the mosque.

The Böcekli Mosque Fountain is an outlet of the Hamidiye water system. A cast-iron fountain was installed west of the mosque (now on Sinan Street, across Bayar Avenue) in the early 20th century.

The mosque underwent restoration in 1982 and 2015–2019.
