= St. Ignatius Greek Orthodox Cemetery, Kadıköy =

Greek Orthodox church operated cemetery in Kadıköy, Istanbul

St. Ignatius Greek Orthodox Cemetery
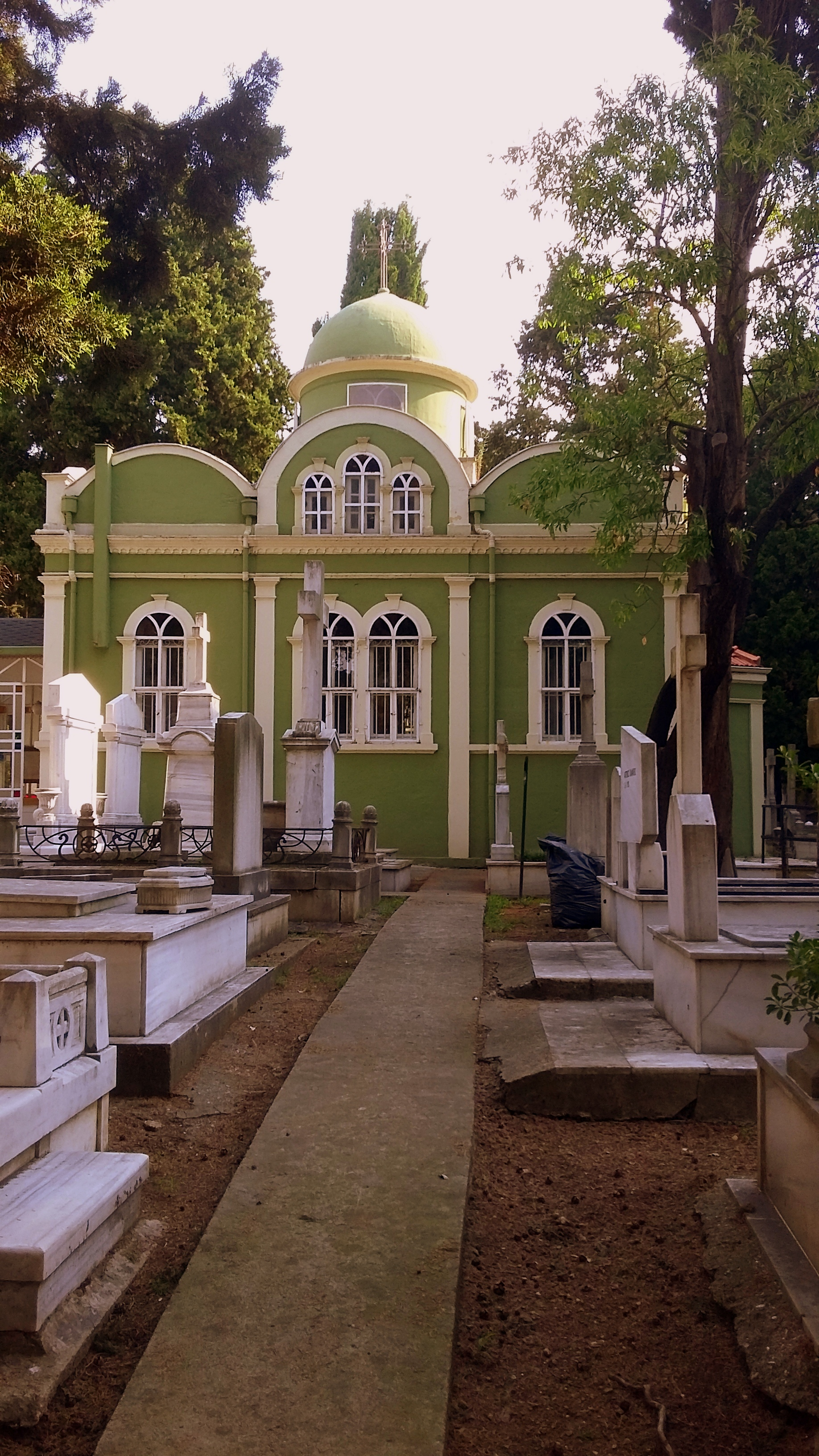
- The cemetery chapel
- Interactive map of St. Ignatius Greek Orthodox Cemetery

Details
- Established: 1895
- Location: Kadıköy, Istanbul
- Country: Turkey
- Coordinates: 40.999176°N 29.047627°E
- Type: Christian Orthodox Cemetery
- Style: 19th century European

Kadıköy Greek Orthodox Cemetery (Greek: Ελληνορθόδοξο Νεκροταφείο της Χαλκηδόνας), also known as Hasanpaşa Uzunçayır Orthodox Cemetery, is a Christian cemetery in Istanbul, Turkey. The burial ground is the final resting place of people professing the Orthodox faith in Istanbul. The cemetery is located in Kadıköy district of Istanbul just across the Doğuş University campus in Kadıköy.

== History and description ==
The Greek Orthodox community of ancient Chalcedon buried the dead around the churches and monasteries, as usual in the Christian world. During the Byzantine period, the Christian cemetery near the monastery of Agia Vassi (near the famous basilica of St. Euphemia where The Council of Chalcedon, the Fourth Ecumenical Council of the Christian Church, took place in the city of Chalcedon in the year 451) around the pier of the port of Haydarpaşa, continued to function after the conquest. However, with the increase of the Greek population in the 19th century, there was a need to create a regular burial ground outside the settlements. The old Greek Orthodox cemetery of Kadıköy, which was established during this period, was located at the intersection of Söğütlüçeşme and Bahariye streets.

Until the early years of the Republic, the tradition of burying community leaders and high-ranking clergy in churchyards and crypts continued. During the reign of Sultan Abdülaziz, it was decided to remove cemeteries from cities and settlements due to sanitary measures. Nevertheless, it is known that the church authorities continued to use the old cemeteries within the city for a long time (until the 1880s). The current Eastern Orthodox cemetery that was made available by Sultan Abdul Hamid II for the Greek community on a 10-acre estate in the Hasanpaşa / Uzunçayır area of Kadıköy, continues to be used today. Many prominent artists, doctors and scientists are interred in the cemetery.

The current cemetery was founded in 1895, and consists mostly of Greek graves as well as other Orthodox nationalities and ethnoreligious groups such as Russians, Serbians, Bulgarians, Arab and Turkish/Turkic Christians. In addition to laity, clergy who served the Metropolis of Chalcedon and the diocesan churches are buried in this cemetery.

== Cemetery chapel ==
Inside the cemetery is the Church of Saint Ignatius, built in 1898. Permission to build a cemetery church on land allotted to Orthodox Christians was given in 1898. Pavlos Maksutov, then First Secretary of the Russian Embassy, was personally involved in obtaining the necessary building permits.

The cemetery and the church are dedicated to Ignatios of Constantinople. The appearance of the church bears the features of Russian church architecture. The interior plan is a three-aisled domed basilica. Also in the cemetery there is a charnel house, which was built to preserve the bones collected from old and unclaimed graves, as well as an ossuary located beneath the chapel to deposit the exhumed human remains from relocated former burial grounds.

== Notable burials ==
- Meliton, Metropolitan of Chalcedon (1913–1989), prelate of the Eastern Orthodox Church who served as the Metropolitan of Chalcedon from 1966 until his death in 1989.

== Gallery ==
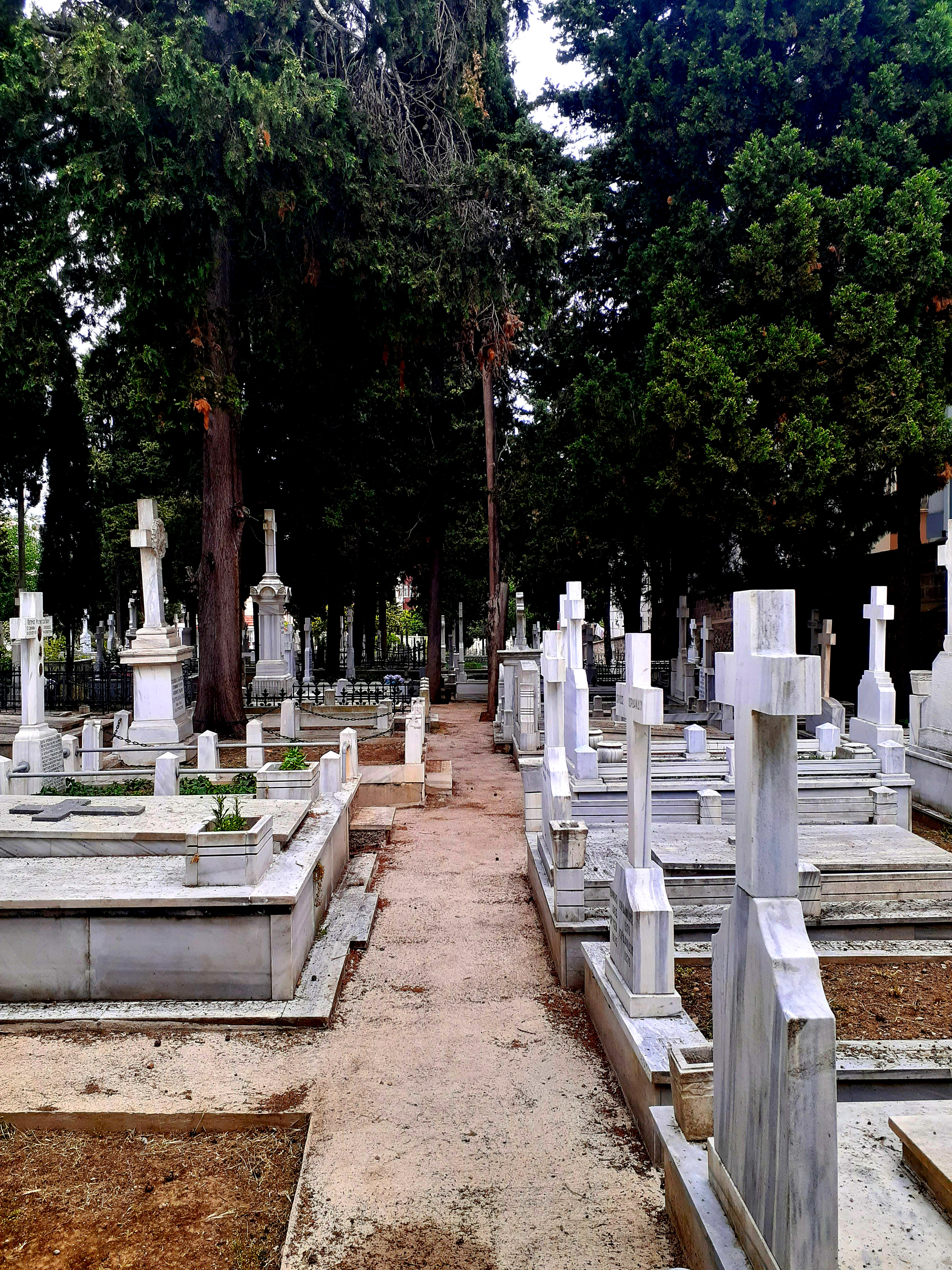

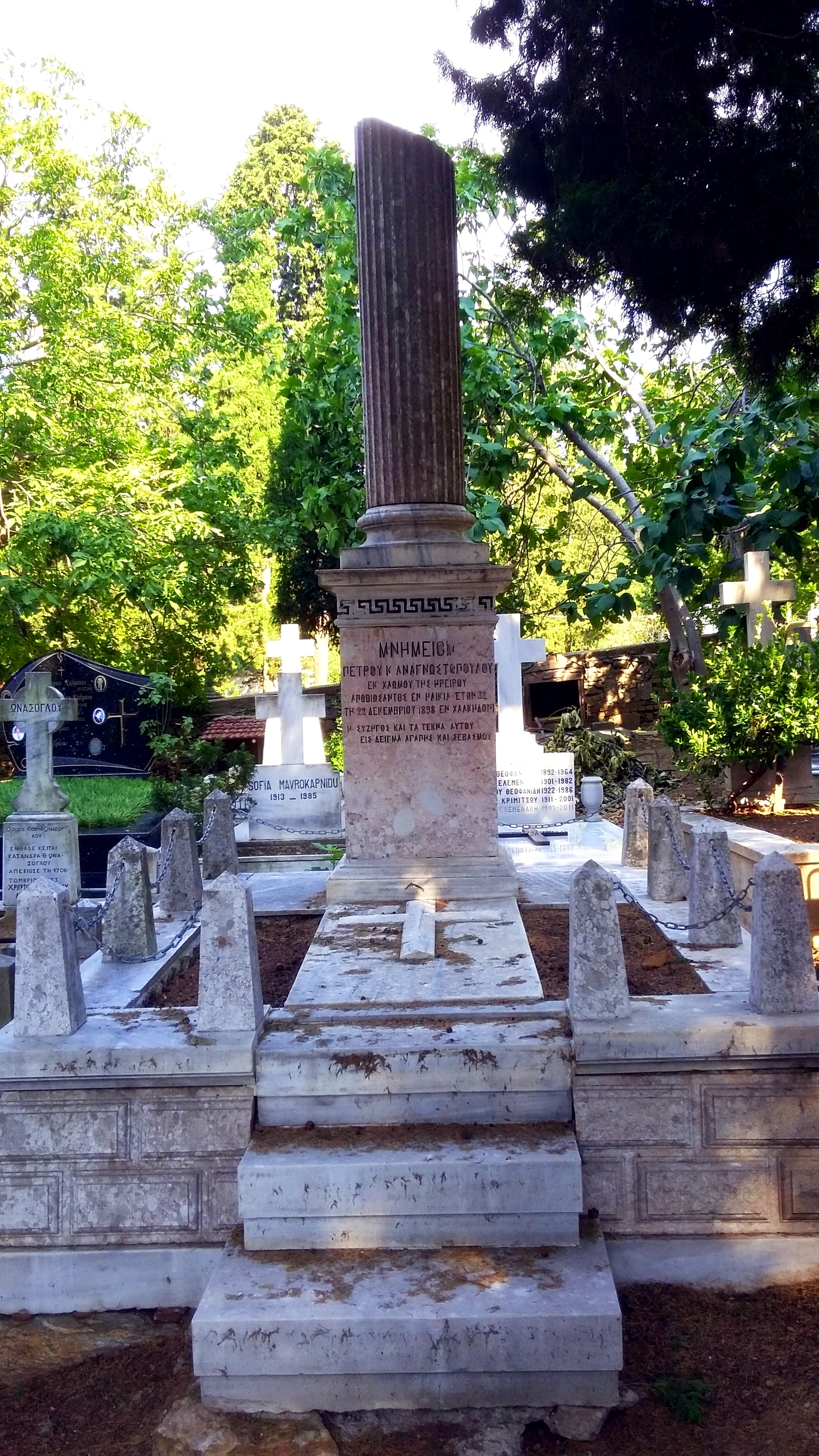

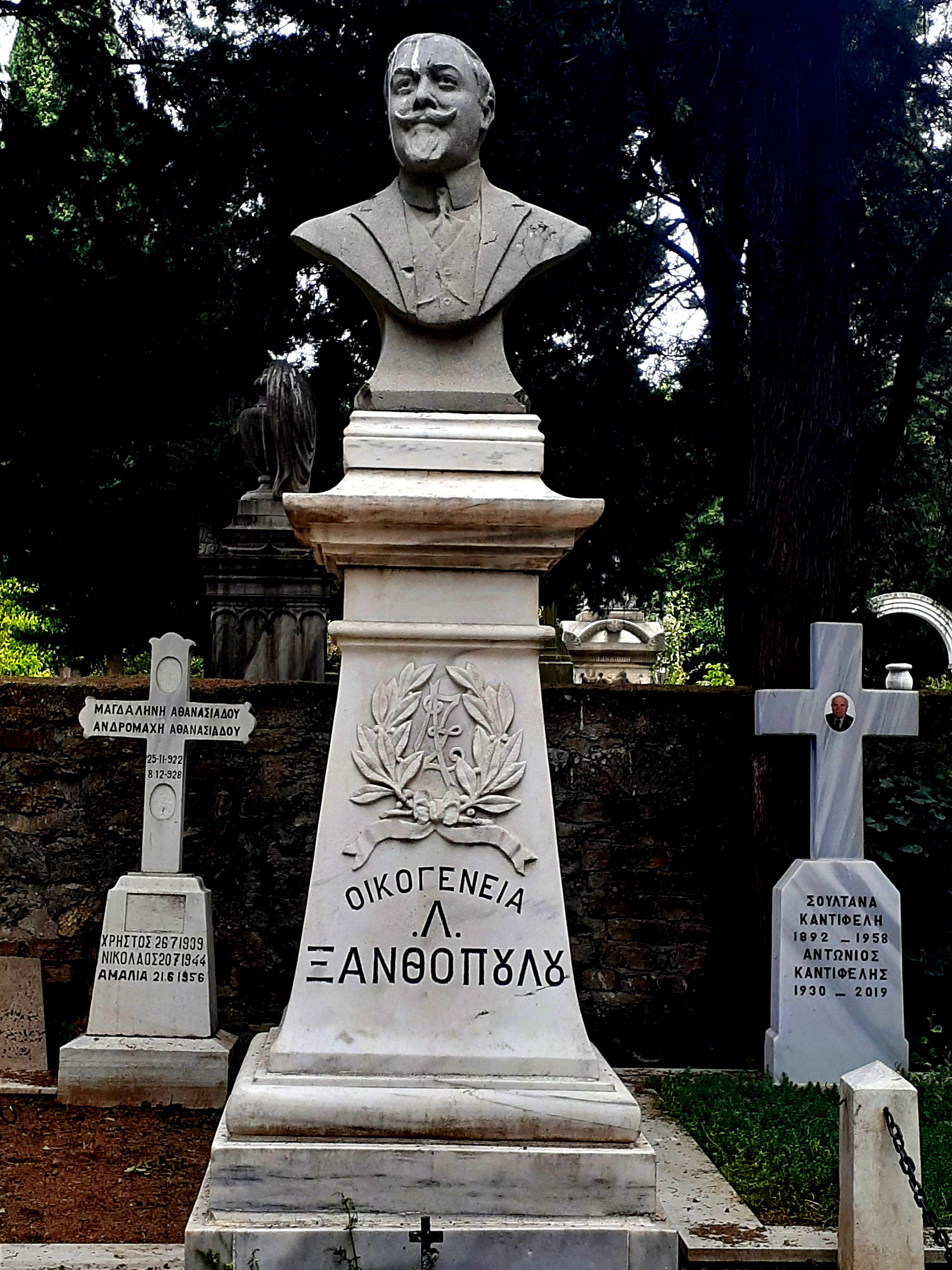

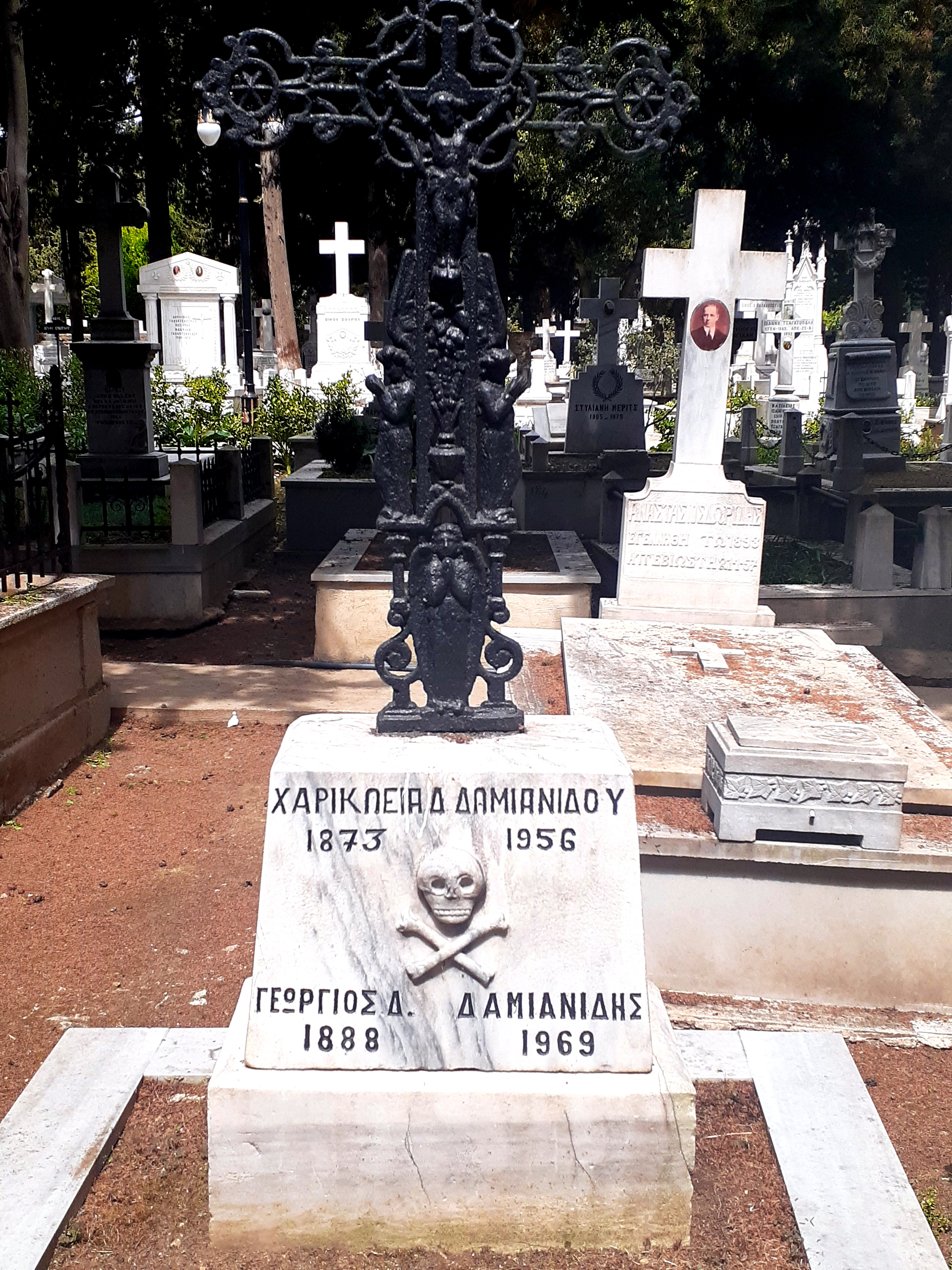

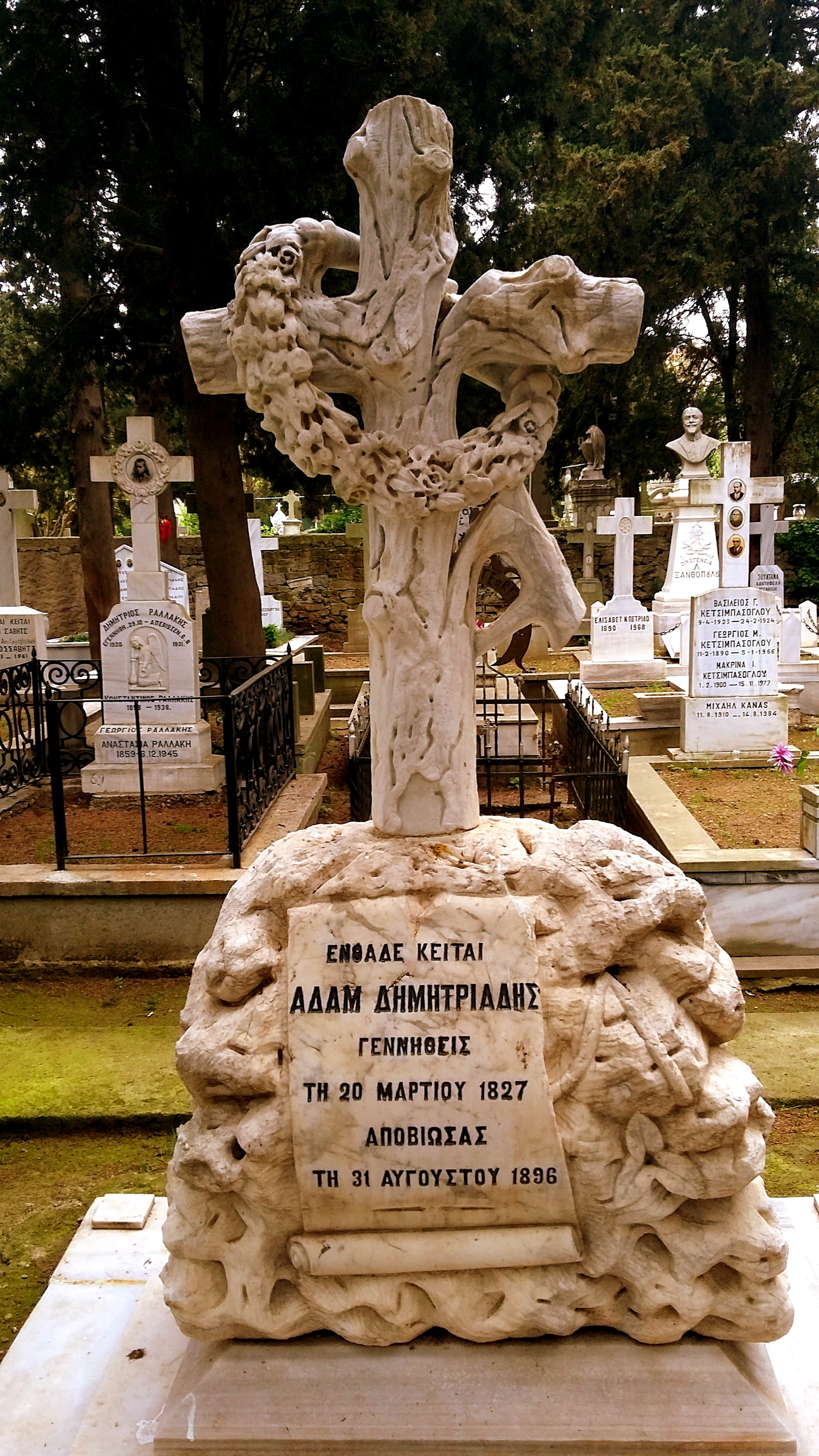

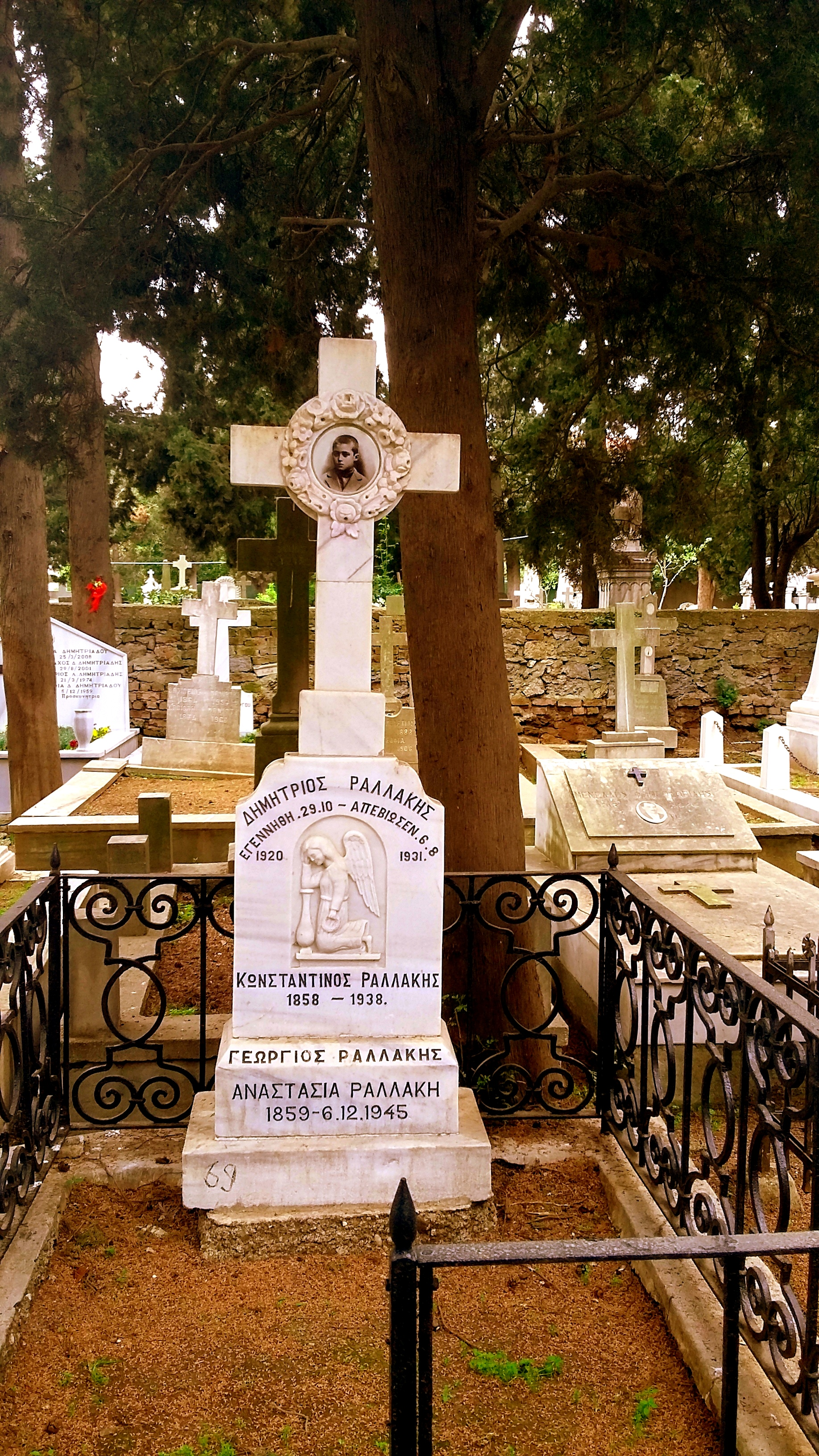

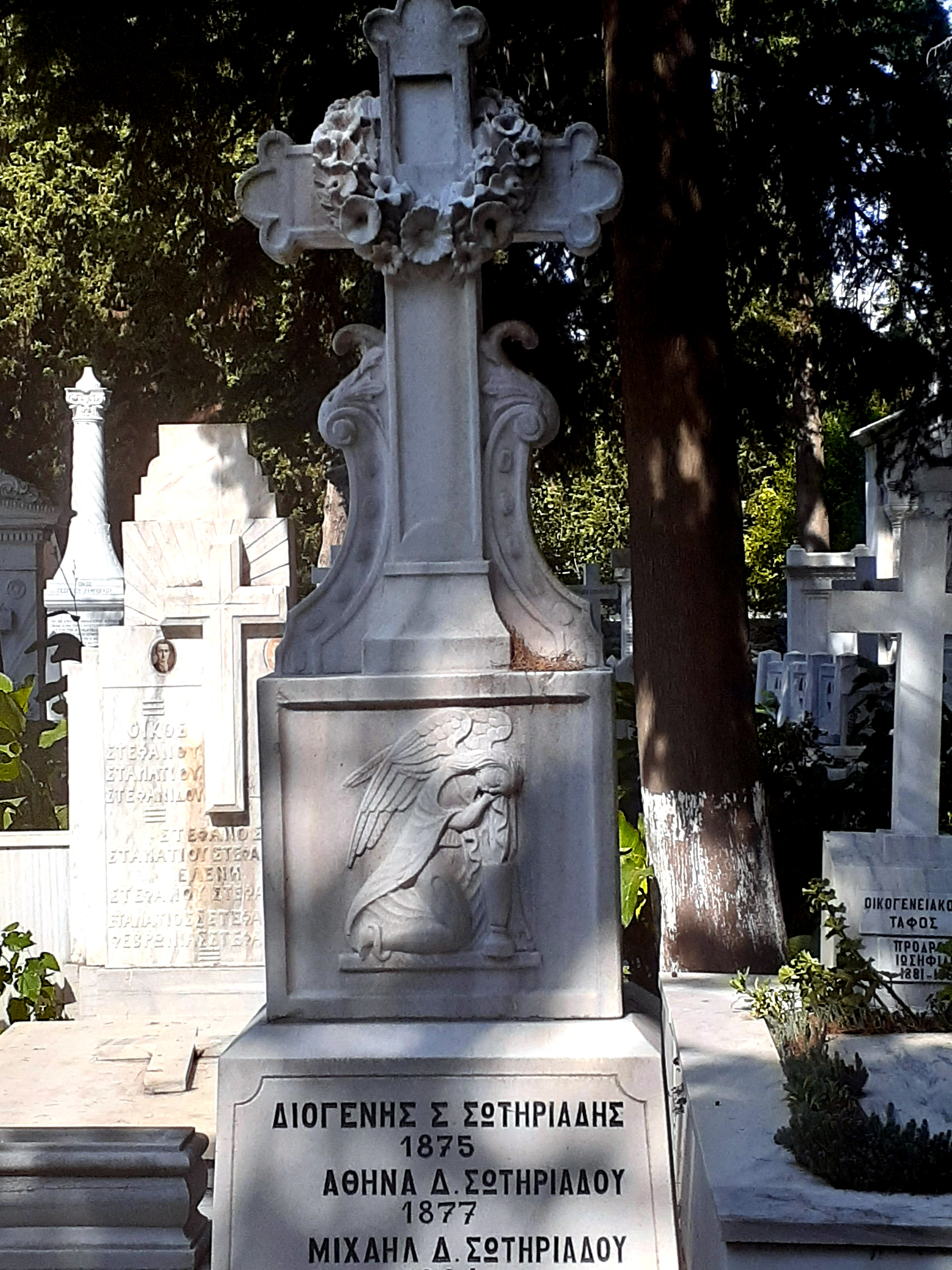

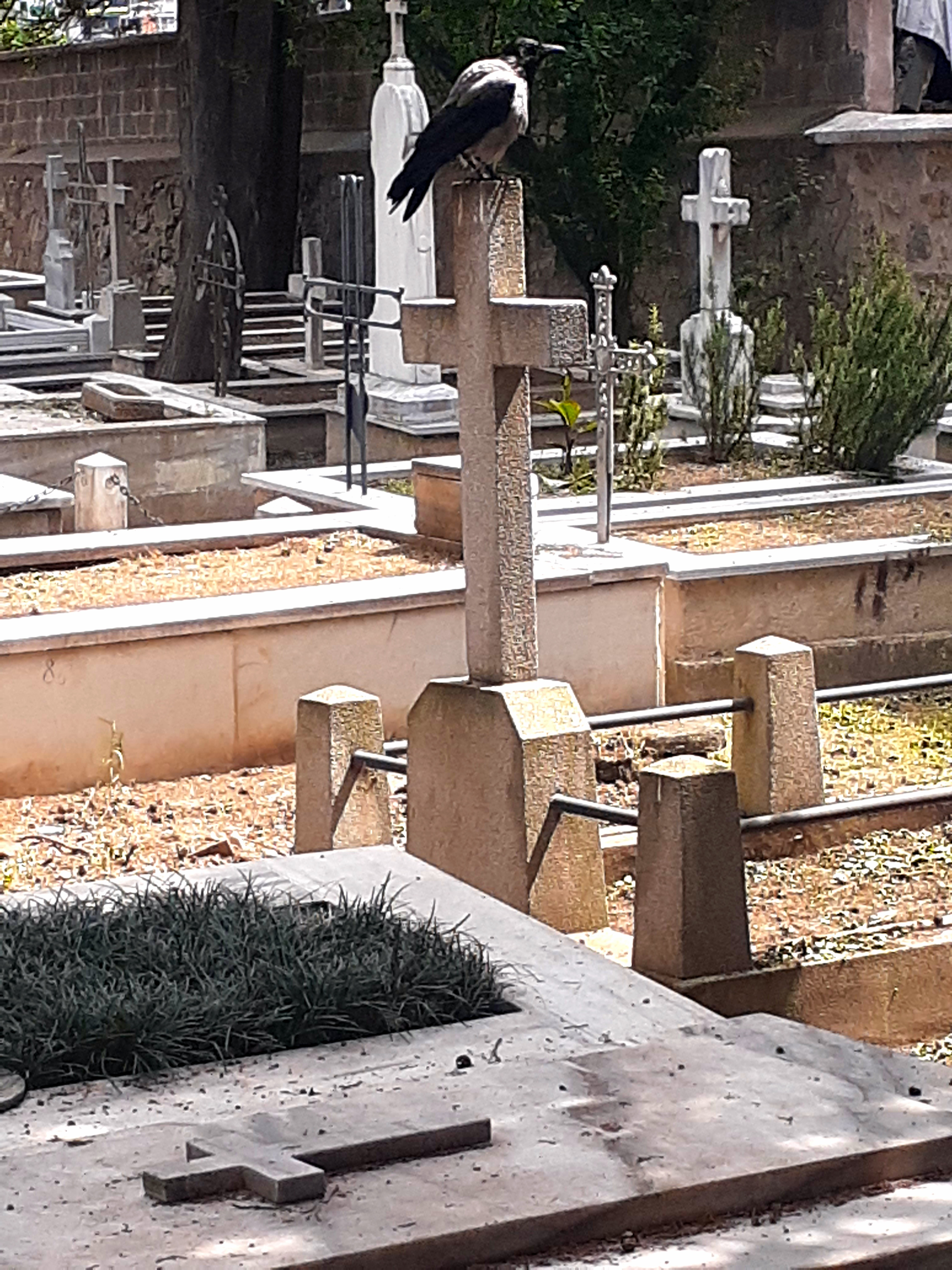

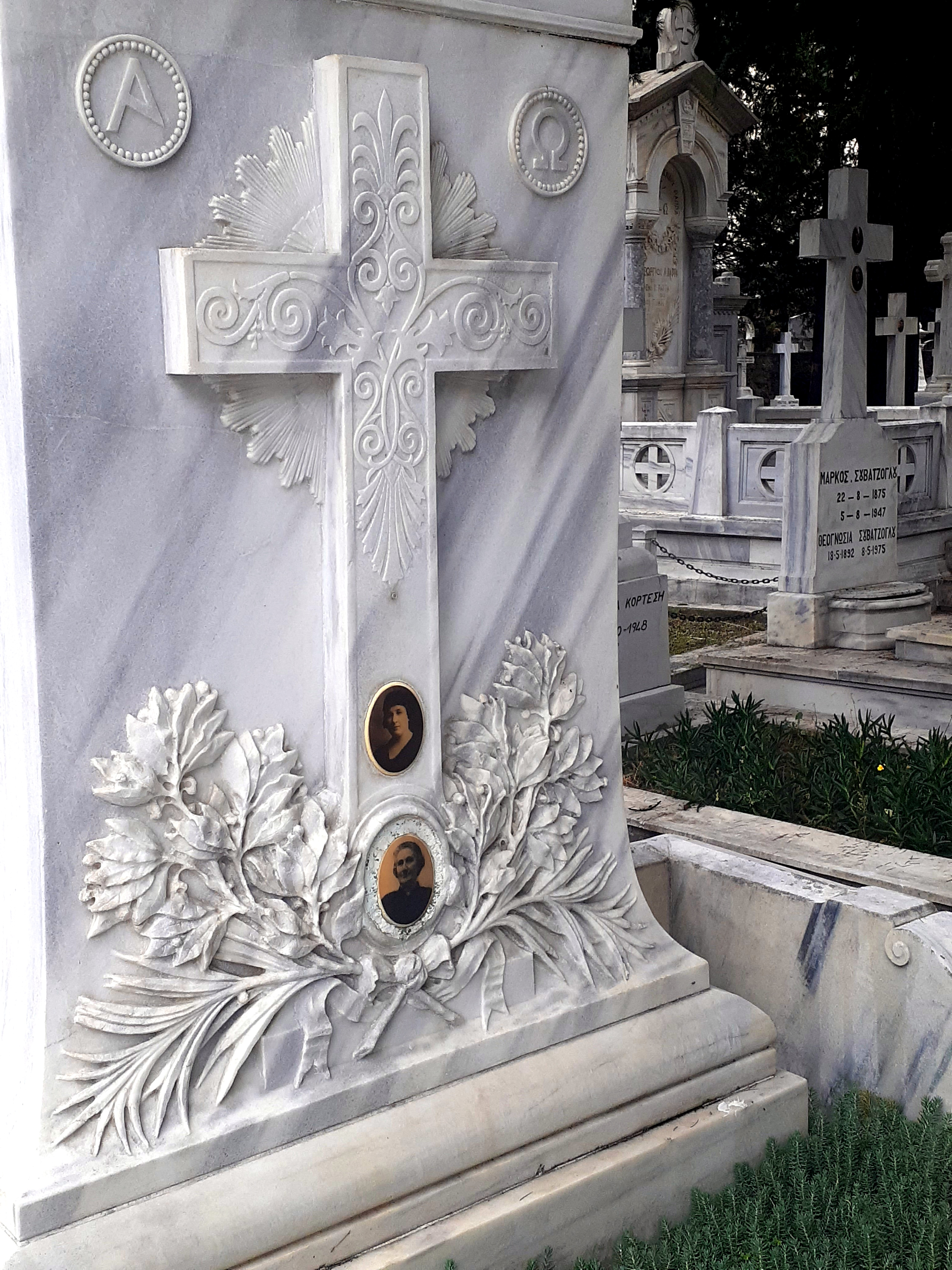

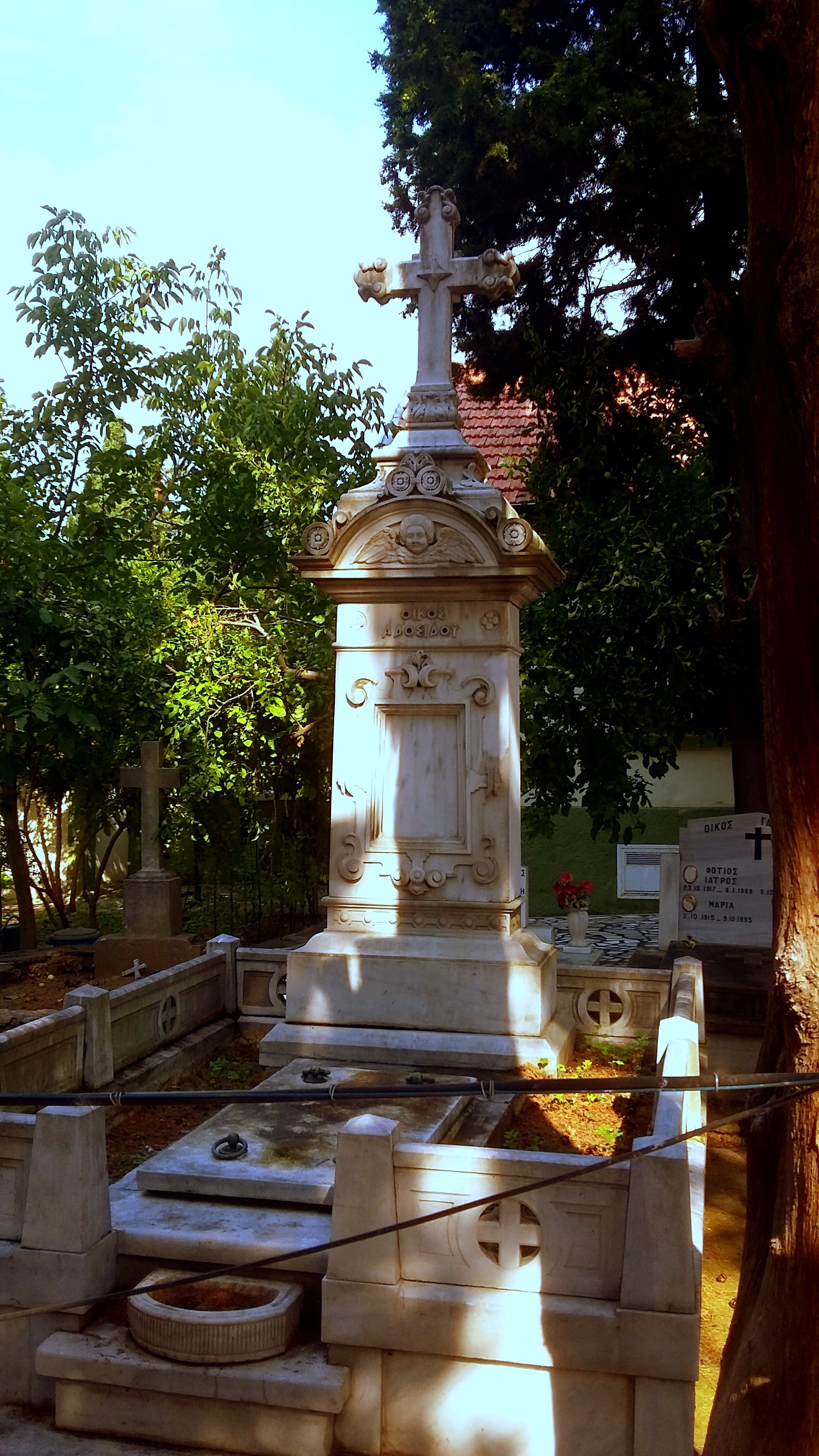

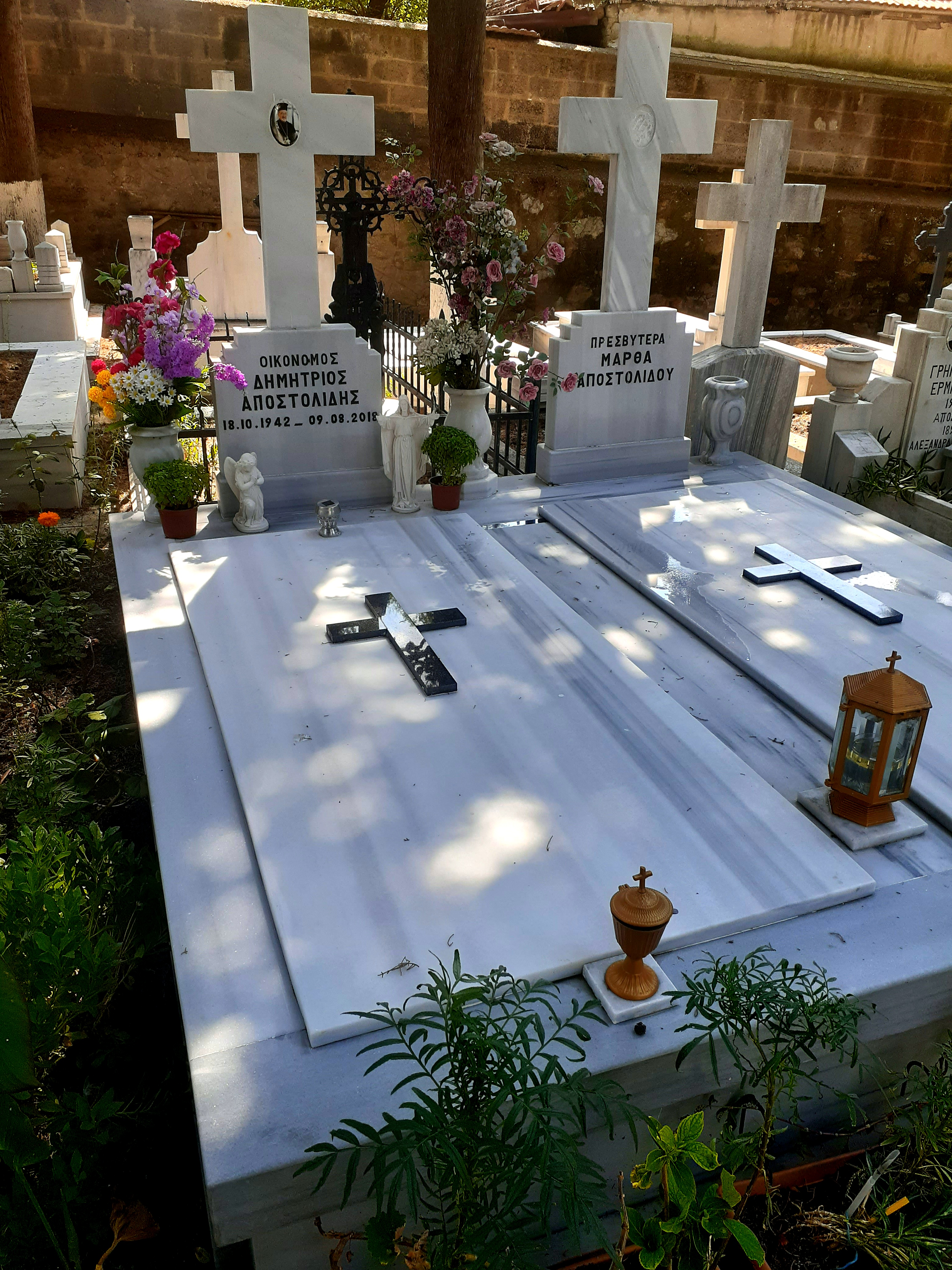

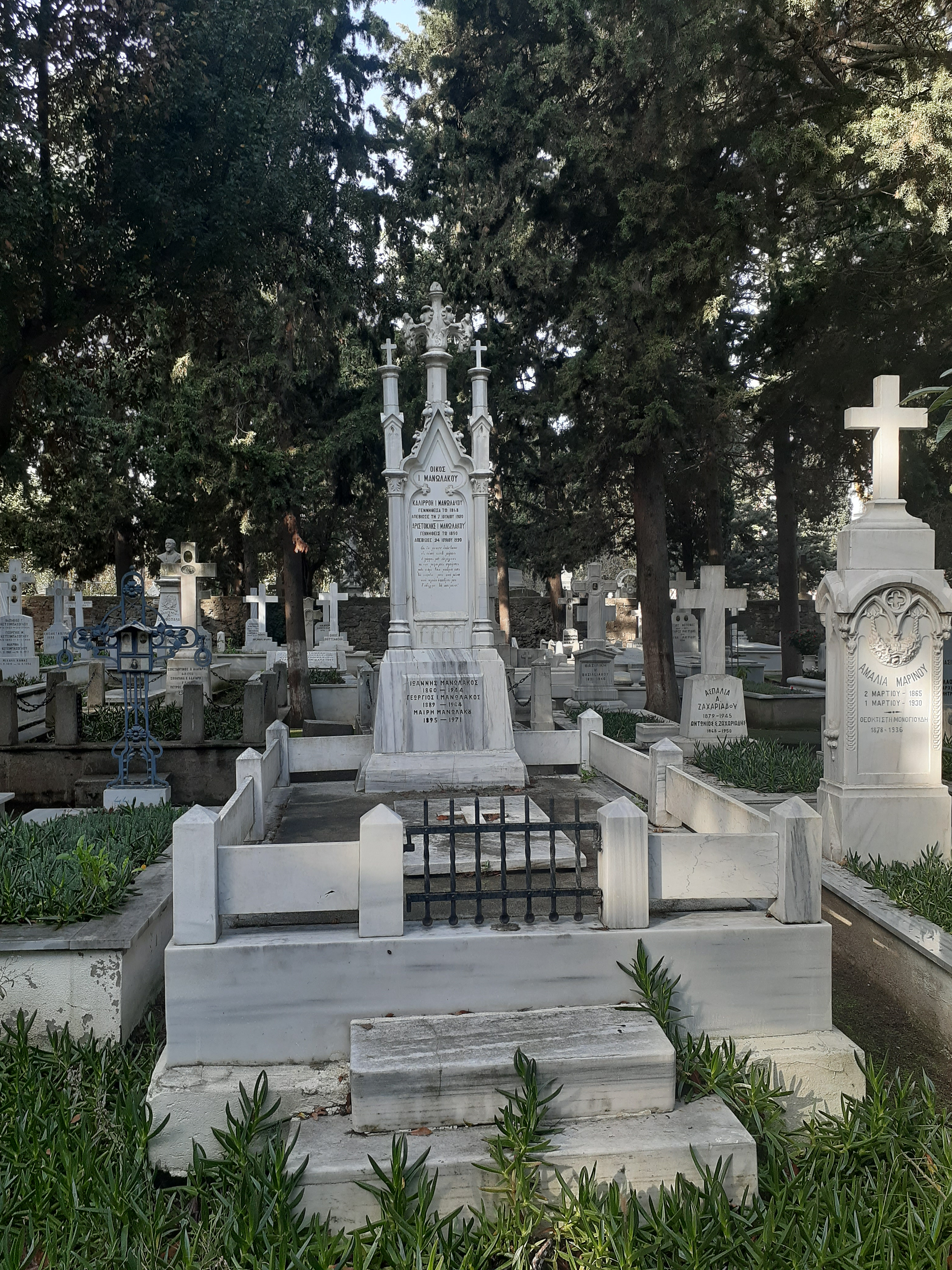

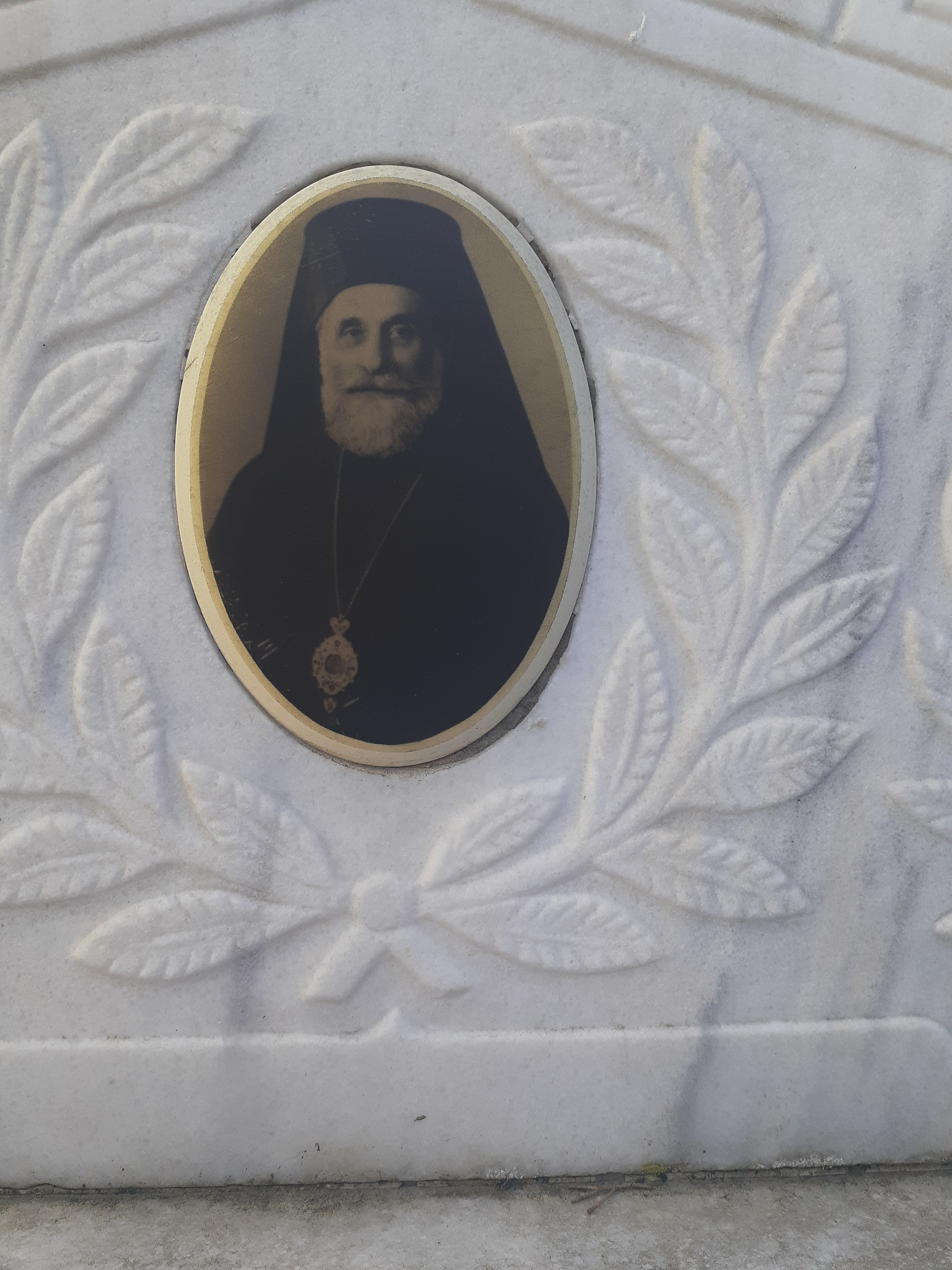

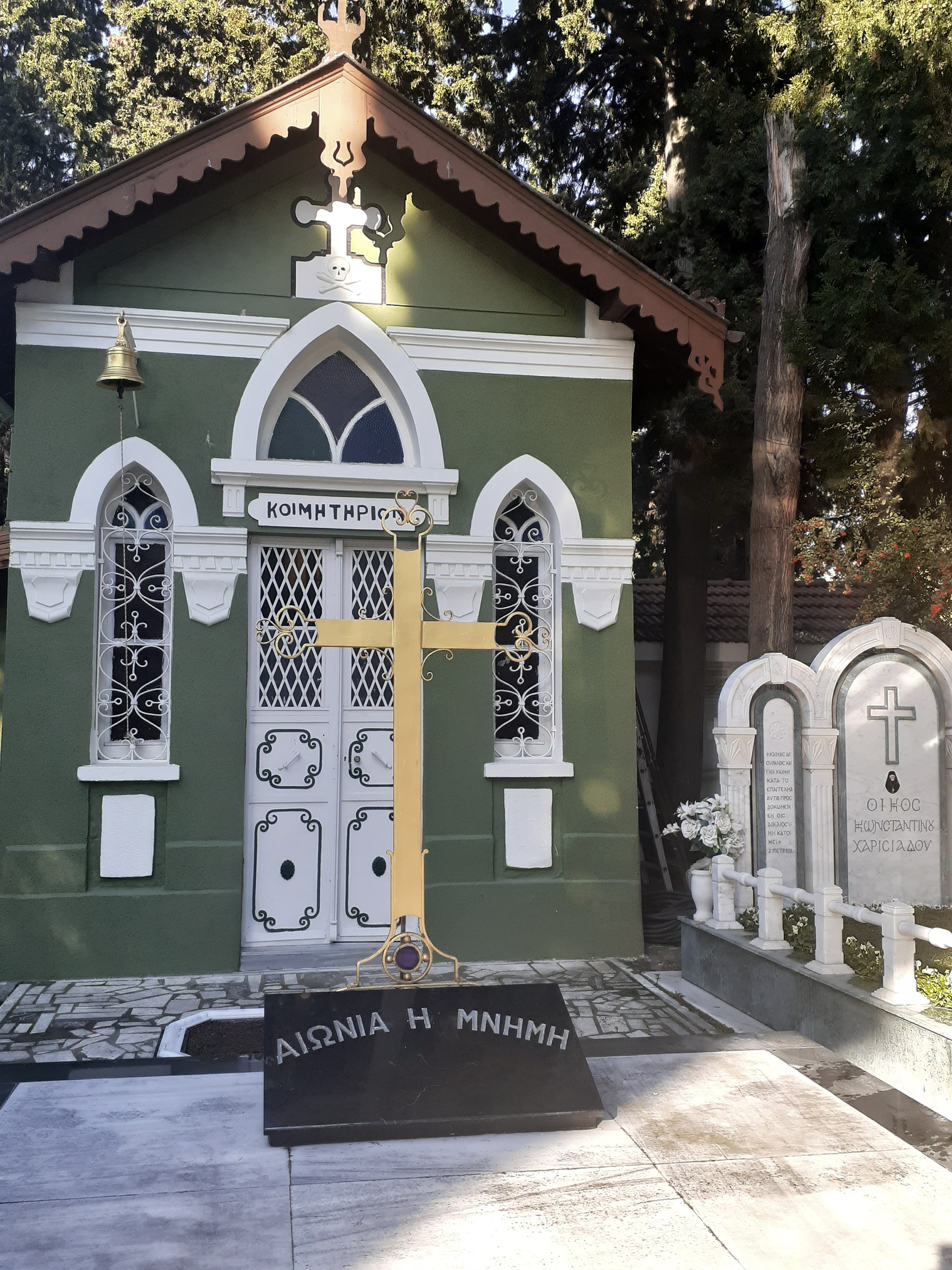

== See also ==
- Chalcedon
- Metropolis of Chalcedon
- Şişli Greek Orthodox Cemetery
