= Sahrayıcedit =

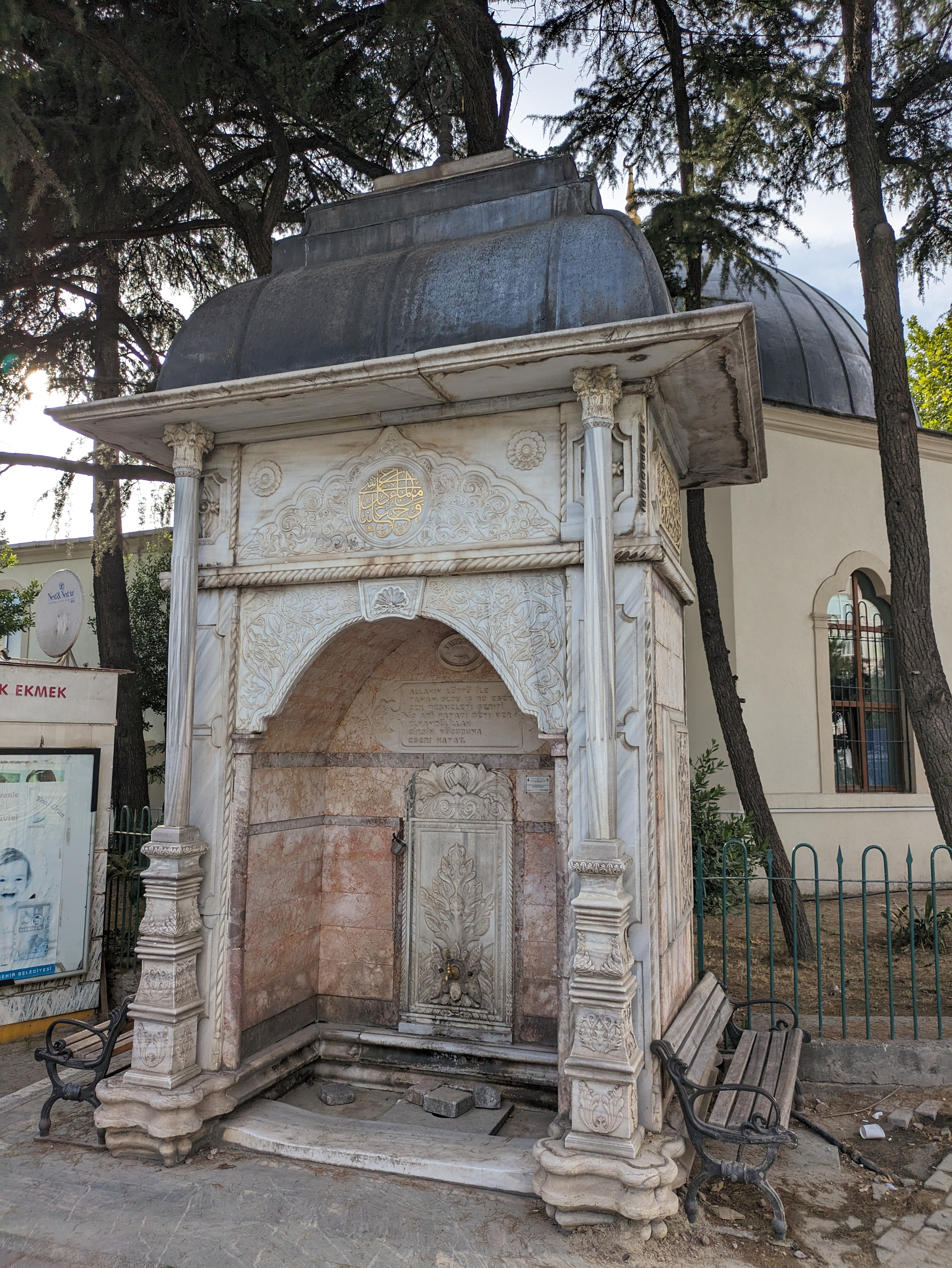
fountain, Sahrayıcedit, Kadıköy, Istanbul

Sahrayicedit is a neighborhood in the Kadıköy district of Istanbul, Turkey. The population of the neighborhood was 30,259 in 2020. It is bordered to the northeast by the D.100 highway and the adjacent Ataşehir district, to the south by the 19 Mayıs neighborhood of Kadıköy, and to the west by the Erenköy and Merdivenköy neighborhoods.

The area was used for lime kilns until some time in the 19th century. At some point the Sahrayıcedit Cemetery was established, the oldest gravestone currently surviving being from 1842. Also, at some point the area was opened to settlement, with the Sahrayıcedit Mosque being constructed in 1875.

The name of the neighborhood means “new uninhabited area” or “new desert" and may have signified “a kind of desert surrounded by vineyards.”

The neighborhood is mostly residential, with 14,188 residences, but only 1,181 places of business. Mosques in the neighborhood include Sahrayicedit Mosque, Buhur Baba Mosque, Arapgirli Hüseyin Avni Mosque, Böcekli Mosque, and Halil İbrahim Mescit.

A metro station is under construction which will be part of the M12 line.
