= Meliton, Metropolitan of Chalcedon =

Prelate of the Eastern Orthodox Church

His Eminence Meliton
- Metropolitan of Chalcedon
- Native name: Μελίτων
- Metropolis: Chalcedon
- In office: 1966 – 1989

Orders
- Consecration: 30 November 1950

Personal details
- Born: Sotirios Hatzis; 1913 Istanbul, Turkey
- Died: 27 December 1989 Istanbul, Turkey
- Denomination: Eastern Orthodox Church

Meliton (born Sotirios Hatzis) (1913 – 27 December 1989), was a prelate of the Eastern Orthodox Church who served as the Metropolitan of Chalcedon from 1966 until his death in 1989. Born in Istanbul and educated at the Halki Theological Seminary, he was appointed Secretary of the Holy Synod by Patriarch Benjamin I in 1937 and in 1948 Protosynkellos to Patriarchs Maximus V and Athenagoras I.

As Metropolitan of Imbros and Tenedos (1953) and subsequently of Chalcedon (1966), Meliton was the right-hand man of Athenagoras I, the Ecumenical Patriarch of Constantinople. He was strongly favoured to succeed Athenagoras in 1972, but the Turkish Government, in an effort to keep the Patriarchate under its control, had Meliton's name removed from the list of acceptable candidates.

He was known for his role in ecumenical relations and for Pope Paul VI's gesture of kneeling to kiss his feet during a visit to the Vatican on 7 December 1975. Meliton was no friend of the Regime of the Colonels and after his sermon "I condemn hypocrisy" at the Metropolitan Cathedral of Athens on 8 March 1970, ostensibly encouraging preparation for Lent but widely understood and intended as an attack on the regime, enjoyed considerable following in Greece.

In 1984 Meliton suffered a severe stroke from which he never fully recovered. He died five years later in Istanbul. His body rests at St. Ignatius Greek Orthodox Cemetery, Kadıköy.
