= Canonical act =

Official register of documents used in ecclesiastical procedures

In canon law, a canonical act is an official register of documents used in ecclesiastical procedures.

According to the old Roman jurisprudence, acts are the registers (acta) in which were recorded the official documents, the decisions and sentences of the judges. Acts designate in law whatever serves to prove or justify a thing. Records, decrees, reports, certificates, etc. are called acts. Canonical acts derive their name from connection with ecclesiastical procedure. Acts may be public or private, civil or ecclesiastical.

Public acts are those certified by a public notary or other person holding a public office or position. These acts may be judicial, or a part of court-procedure, or voluntary. In contentious trials to secure justice, the acts should be judicial; extra judicial acts are not contentious but voluntary. Both civil and canon law recognize as public acts those that occur before witnesses, if these acknowledge them before the court, otherwise they are private. Public acts include any action taken by the judge, the authorities he may quote, the proceedings in the court, documents drawn from the public archives. An original document of a community, bishop, or public officer, with the official seal, or a copy of these sent by these persons with due authentication, is a public act. Public acts are determinative against anyone, though at times they may not impose personal obligation on those not participating in them. In old public acts, the presumption is in favour of their being rightly done; to upset their value, the burden of proof is upon him who attacks them or argues that they were not executed with due formalities. Ecclesiastically, an exception is made for alienation of Church property, where, for the validity of a deed, a further requisite may be exacted, such as a clear proof of the authorisation of a bishop, or the consent of the chapter. For these presumption does not suffice.
