= Metropolis of Chalcedon =

Territory

- Primate: Elder Metropolitan Emmanuel of Chalcedon (Adamakis)
- Language: Greek
- Headquarters: Chalcedon/Kadıköy
- Independence: 451 AD. (to metropolis)
- Recognition: Orthodox
- Official website: http://www.ec-patr.org/dioceses.php?lang=&id=89

The Metropolis of Chalcedon (Greek: Μητρόπολη Χαλκηδόνος) is an ecclesiastical territory (diocese) of the Ecumenical Patriarchate of Constantinople. The metropolis is led by Metropolitan Emmanuel (Adamakis) since 2021.

Christianity spread in Chalcedon during the 2nd century AD. The city was initially the see of a bishopric before being promoted to a metropolis at 451 AD, at the time of the Fourth Ecumenical Council. In 2005, it was the senior of the four remaining active Greek Orthodox Church metropolises of the Ecumenical Patriarchate in Turkey and the only one surviving in Asia Minor (Anatolia). As of 2024, it is numbered as the senior of nine active Metropolises that are active in Turkey, after the Archdiocese of Constantinople-New Rome.

== History ==
=== Early Christianity and Council of Chalcedon ===
Christianity spread in the region of Chalcedon, on the Asian shore opposite Byzantium (later Constantinople) already from the 2nd century AD. Among the first bishops, Hadrian was martyred during the 2nd (or 4th) century and is venerated by the Orthodox Church. Chalcedon was also the place of martyrdom of saint Euphemia.

The city of Chalcedon enjoyed considerable prestige thanks to the Ecumenical Council that was convoked there at 451 AD, after the initiative of Byzantine Emperor Marcian and Empress Pulcheria. Its aim was to denounce the decisions of the Second Council of Ephesus, commonly known as the Robber Council, in 449. The decisions of the Council consolidated the Nicene Creed and renounced as heretical number of contemporary doctrines: Apollinarism, Monophysitism and Nestorianism. On the other hand, Jesus Christ was accepted as perfect God and human with logical soul. Moreover, it recognized two indivisible and inseparable natures in Jesus. It also accepted the nature of Virgin Mary as Mother of God (Theotokos). According to the 28th canon of the Council, the Church of Constantinople gained privileges equal to those of Rome, which however were not clearly defined. The same canon clarified that the bishop of Constantinople held the prerogative of honors right after the bishop of Rome.

=== Byzantine era ===
In 451, the year that the local Ecumenical Council took place, the bishopric of Chalcedon was promoted to a metropolis. It was the third oldest metropolis in the region of Bithynia, in northwestern Asia Minor, after Nicaea and Nicomedia, while its prelate officially styled as Exarch of all Bithynia.

A number of metropolitans and bishops of Chalcedon participated in the Byzantine Iconoclasm dispute, during the 8th–9th centuries. Some of them were martyred and are venerated by the Orthodox Church, like Metropolitans Nicetas, Kosmas and John. In 858 the local metropolitan, Basil, due to his participation in the Photian schism, was released from his duties by Patriarch Photios. However, later, in 869–870, after the restoration of patriarch Ignatios, Basil returned to the metropolitan throne where he remained until 877.

Later, ca. 1100, Metropolitan Leo was involved in ecclesiastical issues and was accused of heresy. He also accused Emperor Alexios I Komnenos of sacrilege and iconoclasm, because he allowed the melting of religious gold and silver objects in order to sustain his war effort.

Greek-Orthodox metropolises in Asia Minor, ca. 1880.

Due to the long tradition of Saint Euphemia and its association with the area of Chalcedon, the local metropolitans claimed and occasionally succeeded in controlling a number of churches and shrines dedicated to her in the region of Constantinople. In 1316 the metropolis received the church of Maeroneia, which it kept until 1327.

=== Ottoman period ===
During the 14th century, the metropolitan see remained vacant, due to the Ottoman conquest of the region. Chalcedon was given to the metropolitan of Cyzicus in 1387, along with its treasury in Constantinople, as both dioceses were facing decline.

The city of Chalcedon was destroyed many years before [by the Ottomans] and there are very few inhabitants, so there is no need for a bishop.

Chalcedon was reorganized in the 15th century, possibly after the Fall of Constantinople and the subsequent incorporation of the Ecumenical Patriarchate into the millet system of Ottoman society. The first recorded metropolitan of that time was Joseph, in 1477. The following years the jurisdiction of the metropolis was extended to the east. During the late 17th century the see of the diocese was transferred to Kuzguncuk (Ermoulianai, Chrysokeramos), where it remained until 1855. At that period a number of monasteries were established, like the one of Saint Panteleimon, which was declared Stauropegic.

The metropolitan of Chalcedon was one of the five Senior metropolitans from the wider region of Constantinople, the other being those of nearby Herakleia, Cyzicus, Nicaea, and Nicomedia. Following an Ottoman decree of 1757 they had to be always present in the Holy Synod of the Ecumenical Patriarchate and had direct access to the Ottoman Sultan, to whom they announced the election of the new Ecumenical Patriarch.

From the mid-19th century, the local metropolis prospered thanks to the significant population increase and economic development of the local Orthodox population. In 1855 the see of the metropolitan returned to Chalcedon during the primateship of Metropolitan Gerasimos. Moreover, the newly erected church of Saint Euphemia became the new cathedral. The metropolitan mansion was built near the cathedral in 1902.

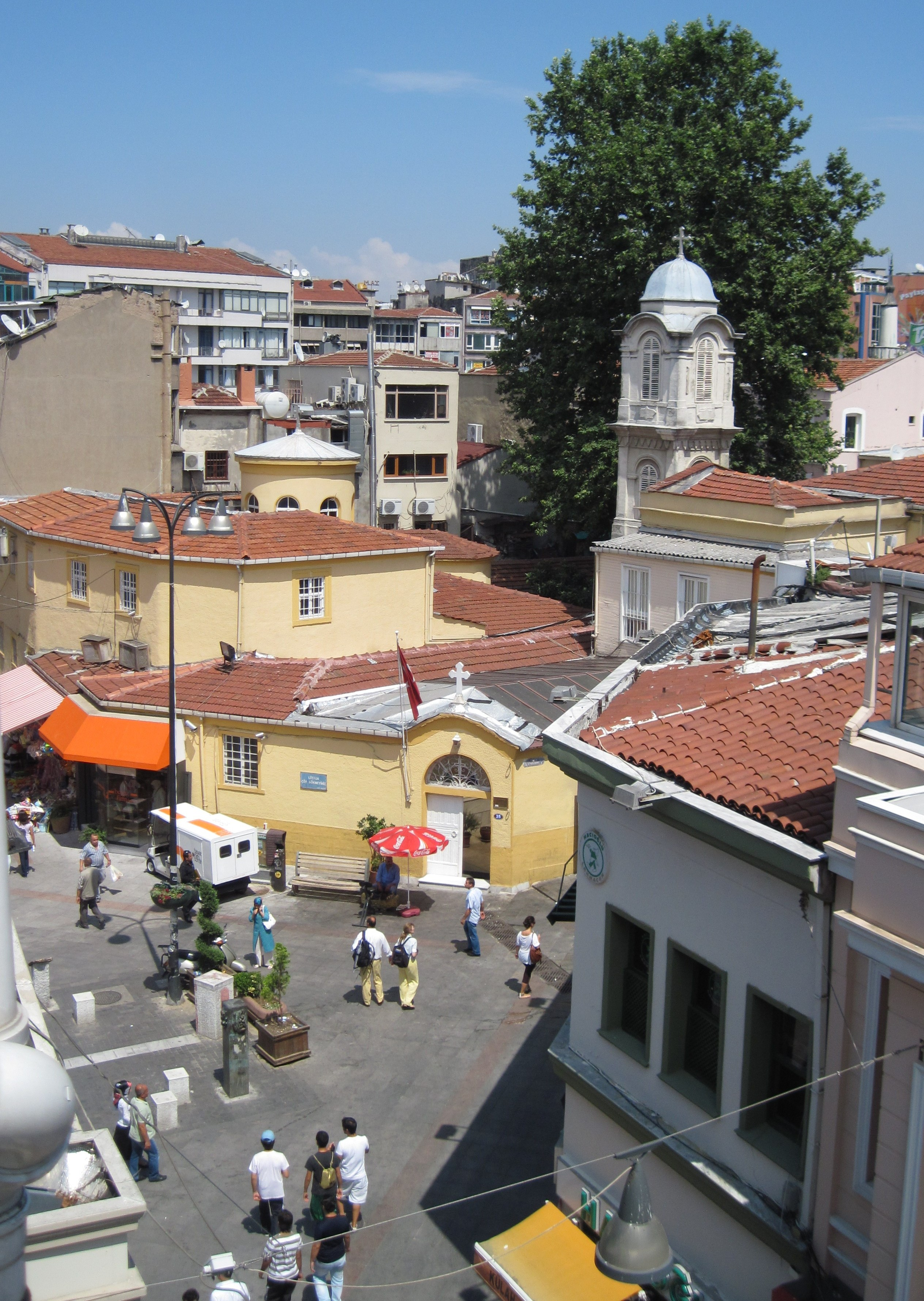
The small church of St Euphemia that serves as the cathedral of Chalcedon.

=== 20th century ===
In 1923, after the Treaty of Lausanne and the subsequent Population exchange between Greece and Turkey, all of the Greek Orthodox population in Anatolia had to move to Greece, with the exception of the Asian outskirts of Constantinople. Thus, the metropolis of Chalcedon became the only active metropolis of the Ecumenical Patriarchate in Anatolia, and one of the four in Turkey. During the anti-Greek Istanbul Pogrom of September 1955, eleven churches under the jurisdiction of the Metropolis of Chalcedon were destroyed, while the remaining three church buildings were saved. Moreover, the fanatical mob attacked the metropolitan mansion and humiliated metropolitan bishop Thomas, dragging him through the streets half naked for hours.

The subsequent decline of the Greek element of Constantinople, especially from 1964 on, has left the metropolitan area of Chalcedon with a small community today. Thomas was succeeded by Meliton who served as the Metropolitan of Chalcedon from 1966 until 1989. Meliton was the right-hand man of Athenagoras, the Ecumenical Patriarch of Constantinople, and active in the Orthodox outreach to the Roman Catholic Church. He was strongly expected to succeed Athenagoras in 1972, but the Turkish Government, in an effort to keep the Patriarchate under its control, had Meliton's name removed from the list of acceptable candidates.

=== Current metropolitan ===
On February 20, 2021, the Ecumenical Patriarch of Constantinople, Bartholomew I, announced the election by the Holy Synod of metropolitan Emmanuel of France as the new metropolitan of the Metropolis of Chalcedon.

== Geography and demographics ==
During the Byzantine era, the metropolis of Chalcedon was always recorded in the lists of the Notitiae Episcopatuum, where it usually ranked 9th. There is no exact information about the extent of its ecclesiastical jurisdiction, but it probably coincided with the city of Chalcedon in addition to a number settlements on the Asian shore of the Bosporus. In the early Ottoman period the area of the metropolis was expanded to the east to include Pontoherakleia (modern Ereğli) and Amastris (modern Amasra), while it also included the Princes' Islands. From the late 19th century it was further expanded and covered an extensive and narrow strip on the Black Sea coast, stretching from Rysion (modern Darıca) on the Propontis to Zonguldak.

Until 1922-1923, the metropolis comprised from 38 Greek Orthodox communities, most of them being found in the region Mesothynia. From 1923 the Greek Orthodox population witnessed a dramatic decrease, as part of the population exchange between Greece and Turkey, while throughout the 20th century its number continued to decline, especially after 1964. Today only a few Christians remain in the diocese of Chalcedon. The Princes' Islands form their own metropolis since 1924.

== Sources ==
- Kiminas, Demetrius (2009). The Ecumenical Patriarchate: A History of Its Metropolitanates with Annotated Hierarch Catalogs. Wildside Press LLC. ISBN 9781434458766.
- Giourgali, H. (2003). "Metropolis of Chalcedon". Εγκυκλοπαίδεια Μείζονος Ελληνισμού, Μ. Ασία.
- Terezakis, Yorgos. "Diocese of Chalkedon (Ottoman Period)". Εγκυκλοπαίδεια Μείζονος Ελληνισμού, Μ. Ασία.
- Ἱερὰ Μητρόπολις Χαλκηδόνος (in Greek)
