= Bartholomew I of Constantinople =

Ecumenical Patriarch of Constantinople since 1991

Ecumenical Patriarch Bartholomew I
- Archbishop of Constantinople, New Rome and Ecumenical Patriarch
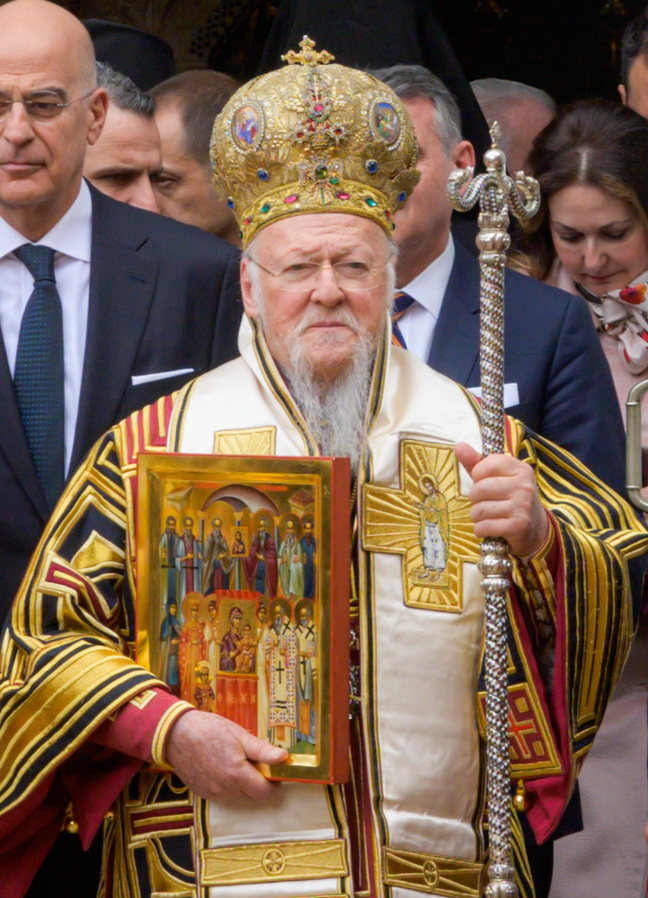
- Patriarch Bartholomew I in 2023
- Church: Ecumenical Patriarchate of Constantinople
- See: Constantinople
- Elected: 22 October 1991
- Installed: 2 November 1991
- Predecessor: Demetrios I

Orders
- Ordination: 19 October 1969 by Meliton (Hatzis)
- Consecration: 25 December 1973 by Ecumenical Patriarch Demetrios

Personal details
- Born: Dimitrios Archontonis; 29 February 1940 (age 86) Agioi Theodori, Imbros, Turkey
- Denomination: Eastern Orthodox
- Residence: Fener, Istanbul, Turkey
- Parents: Christos Archontonis (father); Merope Archontonis (mother)
- Education: Patriarchal Theological School (Halki seminary)
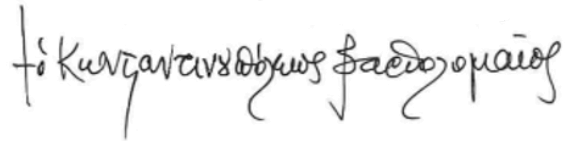
- Signature: Bartholomew I's signature

- Coat of arms: Bartholomew I's coat of arms

Styles of Ecumenical Patriarch Bartholomew of Constantinople
- Reference style: His All Holiness
- Spoken style: Your All Holiness

Ecumenical Patriarch Bartholomew I (Note: Greek: Βαρθολομαῖος, romanized: Vartholomaîos, IPA: [var.θo.loˈme.os]) the Great (born Dimitrios Archontonis, (Note: Greek: Δημήτριος Αρχοντώνης, romanized: Dimítrios Archontónis, IPA: [ðiˈmi.tri.os ar.xonˈdo.nis]) 29 February 1940) is the current ecumenical patriarch of Constantinople, serving as the 270th successor of the Apostolic See of St. Andrew. Since his election on 22 October 1991, he has become the longest-serving Ecumenical Patriarch in history. As the primus inter pares (first among equals), he occupies the First See of the Eastern Orthodox Church, acting as the highest-ranking primate and the spiritual leader of Eastern Orthodox Christianity worldwide. (Note: See:)

Bartholomew I was born in the village of Agios Theodoros (officially called Zeytinliköy) on the island of Imbros. Following his studies, he held a prominent position at the Theological School of Halki, where he was ordained a priest. Prior to his election and enthronement as patriarch, he served as metropolitan of Philadelphia and later of Chalcedon, and was an influential member of the Holy and Sacred Synod, shaping the Ecumenical Patriarchate's modern trajectory.

Bartholomew's tenure has been characterized by intra-Orthodox cooperation and intra-Christian and inter-religious dialogue, such as formal visits to Roman Catholic, Old Catholic, Oriental Orthodox, and Muslim leaders seldom previously visited by a patriarch. He has exchanged numerous invitations with church and state dignitaries. His efforts to promote religious freedom and human rights, his initiatives to advance religious tolerance among the world's religions, as well as his efforts to promote ecology and the protection of the environment, have been widely noted, and these endeavors have earned him the title of the "Green Patriarch".

Among his many international positions, he currently sits on the Board of World Religious Leaders for the Elijah Interfaith Institute. In 2018, the Moscow Patriarchate broke communion with the Ecumenical Patriarchate as a result of disputes over his decision to grant autocephaly to the Orthodox Church of Ukraine, an act through which he exercised the unique prerogatives of the Throne of Constantinople as established by the first seven ecumenical councils (notably Canon 3 of Constantinople in AD 381, and Canons 9, 17, and 28 of Chalcedon in AD 451).

== Early life and background ==
Dimitrios Archontonis was born in February 1940 at the village of Agioi Theodoroi on the island of Imbros, the son of Christos and Meropi Archontónis (née Skarlatos), both of Greek descent. He was the fourth and last child and as a boy helped his father in his coffee shop that also doubled as a barber's. His formative years, were rooted in the Greek community of the island and Istanbul.

His education began on his native Imbros and continued at the prestigious Zografeion Lyceum in Istanbul. In 1958, he entered the historic Theological School of Halki on the island of that name (Turkish: Heybeliada), the spiritual and academic heart of the Ecumenical Patriarchate of Constantinople. He graduated in 1961 with a bachelor of theology with highest honors, after submitting his thesis on the "Restoration of Dissolved Marriage". Following his graduation, he fulfilled his military obligations from 1961 to 1963 as a reserve officer in the Turkish Armed Forces, holding the rank of sub-lieutenant.

Recognizing his academic potential, the Ecumenical Patriarchate granted him a scholarship for extensive postgraduate studies at Europe's most distinguished institutions. From 1963 to 1968, Bartholomew pursued advanced theological and legal studies at the Pontifical Oriental Institute of the Pontifical Gregorian University in Rome, the Bossey Ecumenical Institute in Switzerland and LMU Munich in Germany. He was awarded a doctorate in Canon Law from the Pontifical Oriental Institute of the Pontifical Gregorian University. His doctoral thesis focused on the codification of sacred canons and ecclesiastical decrees.

Bartholomew I is fluent in seven languages; Greek, Turkish, Latin, Italian, French, English, and German.

=== Ordinations and ecclesiastical appointments ===
Upon completing his studies in 1961, Dimitrios Archontonis was ordained as deacon, on August 13, 1961 by his spiritual mentor, Metropolitan bishop of Imvros and Tenedos (later Chalcedon) Meliton Hatzis and receiving the ecclesiastical name of Bartholomew. Upon his return to Istanbul from his postgraduate studies in Europe, he was appointed in 1968 as assistant dean of the Theological School of Halki. He was ordained to the holy priesthood as presbyter on October 19, 1969 by Metropolitan Meliton Hatzis. Six months later, Ecumenical Patriarch Athenagoras I, elevated him to the rank of Archimandrite in the Patriarchal chapel of St. Andrew.

In July 1972, following the election and enthronement of Ecumenical Patriarch Demetrios I, Bartholomew was appointed Director of the Private Patriarchal Office of His-All Holiness. Bartholomew was elected Metropolitan bishop of Philadelphia by the Holy and Sacred Synod, in December 19, 1973. He was consecrated to the episcopacy as bishop, on Christmas Day (December 25) at the Patriarchal Cathedral of St. George by the Ecumenical Patriarch Demetrios I. For nearly two decades, he served as the chief administrator and closest confidant of Patriarch Demetrios I, playing a vital role in the governance of the Ecumenical Patriarchate.

On January 14, 1990, he was unanimously elected by the Holy and Sacred Synod, as the Elder Metropolitan bishop of Chalcedon, succeeding his spiritual father, Meliton Hatzis, in one of the most historical and senior sees of the Ecumenical Throne of Constantinople.

Following the repose of Patriarch Demetrios I, the Holy and Sacred Synod unanimously elected Bartholomew as the 270th Archbishop of Constantinople, New Rome and Ecumenical Patriarch on October 22, 1991. His enthronement took place on November 2, 1991, at the St. George's Patriarchal Cathedral, the sacred center of world Orthodoxy.

== Patriarchate ==
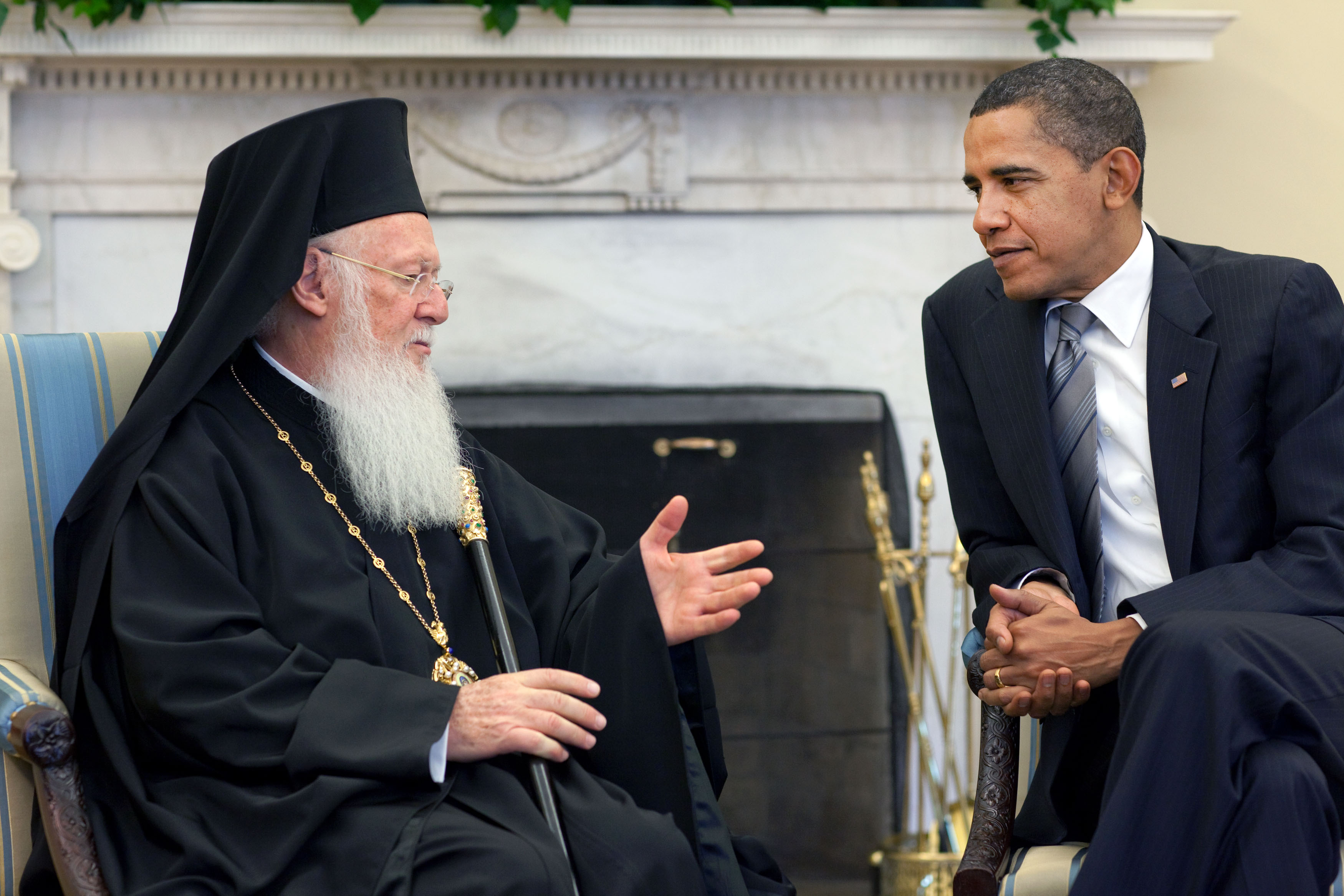
United States President Barack Obama meets with Bartholomew I.

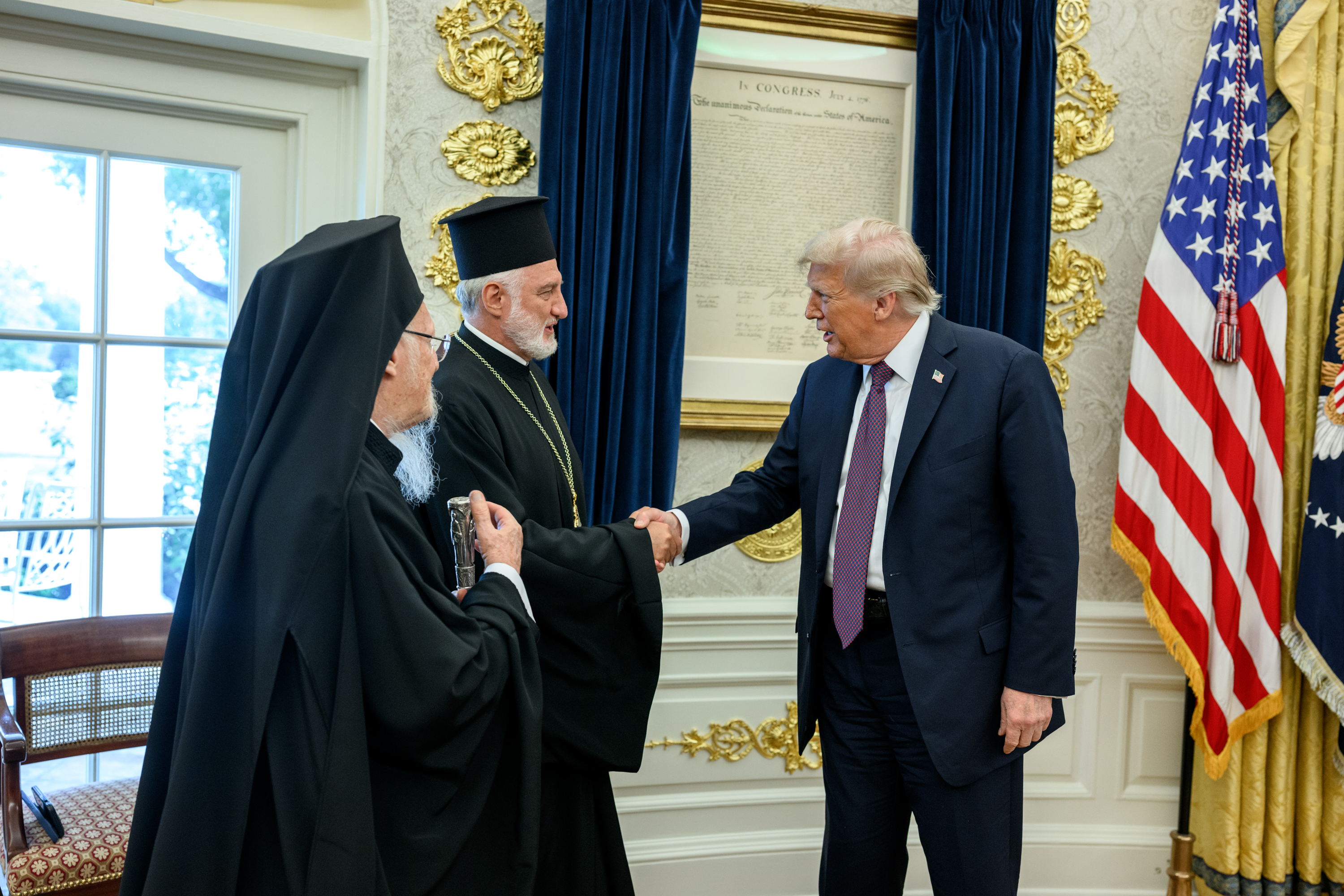
United States President Donald Trump meets with Bartholomew I and Archbishop Elpidophoros of America.

As Ecumenical Patriarch, Bartholomew I has been particularly active internationally. One of his first focuses has been on rebuilding the once persecuted Eastern Orthodox churches of the former Eastern Bloc following the fall of Communism there in 1990. As part of this effort, he has worked to strengthen ties among the various national churches and patriarchates of the Eastern Orthodox Church. He has also continued the reconciliation dialogue with the Catholic Church started by his predecessors and initiated dialogue with other faiths, including other Christian Churches, Muslims, and Jews.

=== Environmentalism ===
Bartholomew has gained a reputation as a prominent environmentalist, putting the support of the Ecumenical Patriarchate behind various international environmental causes. This has earned him the nicknames of "the Green Patriarch" and "the Green Pope", and in 2002 he was honored with the Sophie Prize for his contribution to environmentalism. He has also been honoured with the Congressional Gold Medal, the highest award which may be bestowed by the Legislative Branch of the United States government.

=== Turkey ===
In an interview published on 19 November 2006 in the daily newspaper Sabah, Bartholomew addressed the issues of religious freedom and the then upcoming papal trip of Pope Benedict XVI to Turkey. He also referred to the closing of the Halki seminary by saying: "As Turkish citizens, we pay taxes. We serve in the military. We vote. As citizens we do everything. We want the same rights. But it does not happen... If Muslims want to study theology, there are 24 theology faculties. Where are we going to study?" He also addressed the issue of his ecumenical title and it not being accepted by the Turkish government: "We've had this title since the 6th century... The word ecumenical has no political content. [...] This title is the only thing that I insist on. I will never renounce this title".

During his official visit to Athens in May 2026, Patriarch Bartholomew stated that negotiations with the Turkish authorities had concluded successfully and that the restored seminary would reopen in September.

=== Ecumenical dialogue ===
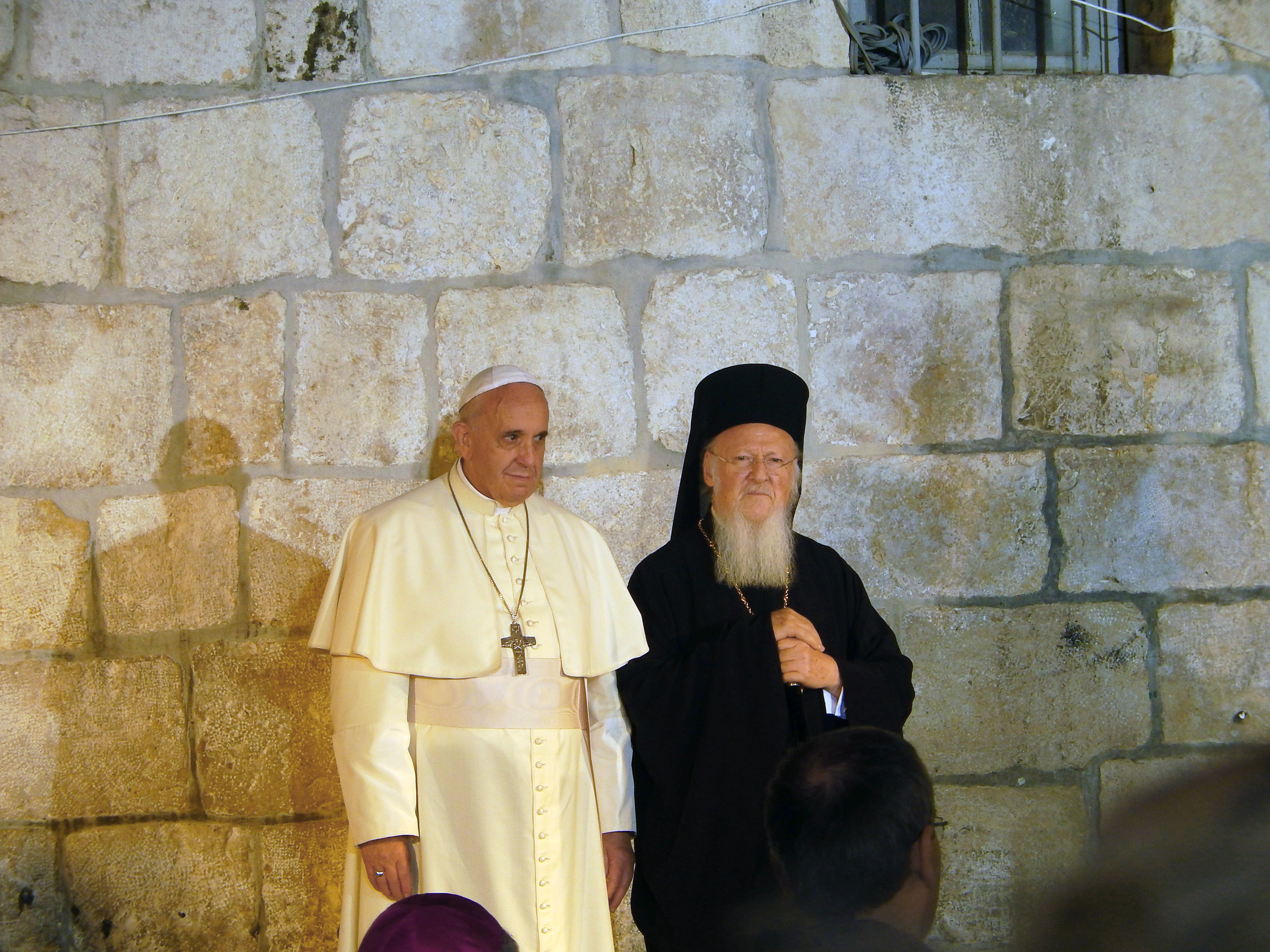
Pope Francis and Bartholomew I in the Church of the Holy Sepulchre in Jerusalem.

During his trip to Turkey in November 2006, Pope Benedict XVI traveled to Istanbul on the invitation of Bartholomew. The pope participated in the feast day services of St. Andrew the First Apostle, the patron saint of the Church of Constantinople. This was the third official visit to the Ecumenical Patriarchate by a pope (the first being by Paul VI in 1967, and the second by John Paul II in 1979). He attended the papal inauguration of Pope Francis on 19 March 2013, paving the way for better Catholic–Orthodox relations. It was the first time that the spiritual head of Eastern Orthodox Christians had attended a papal inauguration since the Great Schism in 1054. After, he invited Pope Francis to travel with him to the Holy Land in 2014 to mark the fiftieth anniversary of the embrace between Patriarch Athenagoras I of Constantinople and Pope Paul VI. Pope Francis was also invited to the Patriarchate for the feast day of Saint Andrew (30 November).

It was after more than two decades as Ecumenical Patriarch, that Bartholomew was the target of an assassination plot which was planned to take place on 29 May 2013. One suspect was arrested and there is an ongoing search for two others.

=== Support of refugees, reunification and peace ===
On 16 April 2016, Bartholomew visited, together with Pope Francis and Archbishop Hieronymus II, the Moria Refugee Camp in the island of Lesbos, to call the attention of the world to the refugee issue. In December 2018, he visited the Korean Demilitarized Zone (KDZ) and prayed for permanent peace and unification on the Korean Peninsula.

=== Autocephaly of the Orthodox Church of Ukraine ===
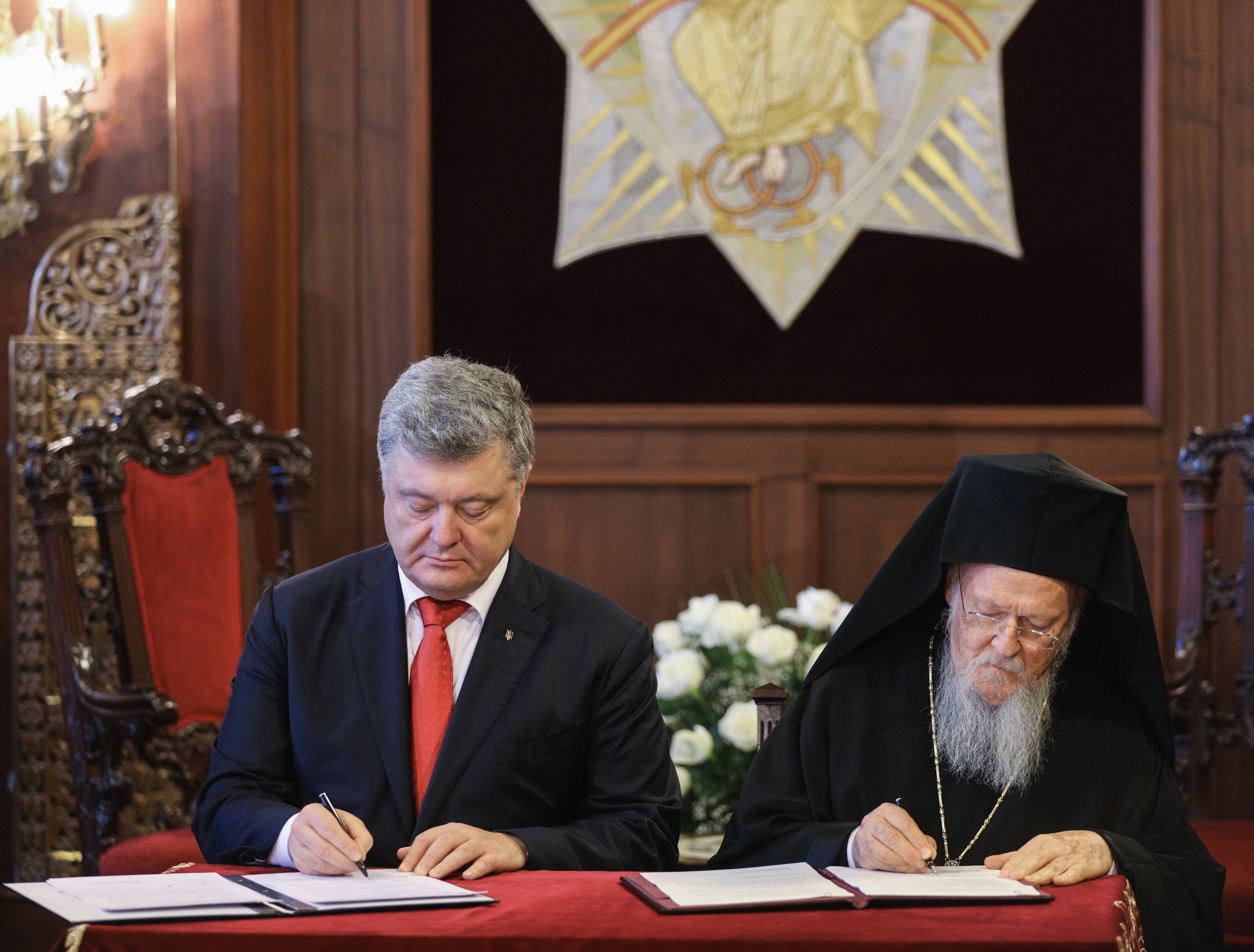
Bartholomew I with Ukrainian President Petro Poroshenko, 3 November 2018.

In October 2018, the synod of the Ecumenical Patriarchate agreed to grant autocephaly (self-governing) to the Orthodox Church in Ukraine, and to revoke the legal binding of the letter of 1686 which led to the Russian Orthodox Church establishing jurisdiction over the all of Rus's Church (including those located within borders of current Ukraine) and to lift the excommunications which affected clergy and faithful of two then unrecognized Orthodox churches in Ukraine, the Ukrainian Autocephalous Orthodox Church (UAOC) and the Ukrainian Orthodox Church – Kyiv Patriarchate (UOC-KP). In response to revoking a legal binding letter, the Russian Orthodox Church announced it was cutting ties of communion with the Ecumenical Patriarchate of Constantinople, which marked the beginning of the 2018 Moscow–Constantinople schism.

On 5 January 2019, Bartholomew granted autocephaly to the newly founded Orthodox Church of Ukraine by Canonical act.

=== Possession of Vatican Saint Peter Bone Fragments ===
On 2 July 2019, it was announced that Pope Francis had given Bartholomew possession of nine bone fragments believed to belong to Saint Peter and which were publicly displayed by Pope Francis in November 2013 during a Vatican "Year of Faith" Mass. Bartholomew, who also gained possession of the bronze reliquary in which they are displayed, described the Pope's gesture as "brave and bold".

=== Macedonian Orthodox Church ===
In 2022, the Ecumenical Patriarchate accepted the Macedonian Orthodox Church – Archdiocese of Ohrid into communion, recognizing North Macedonia as a canonical jurisdiction.

=== Russian invasion of Ukraine ===
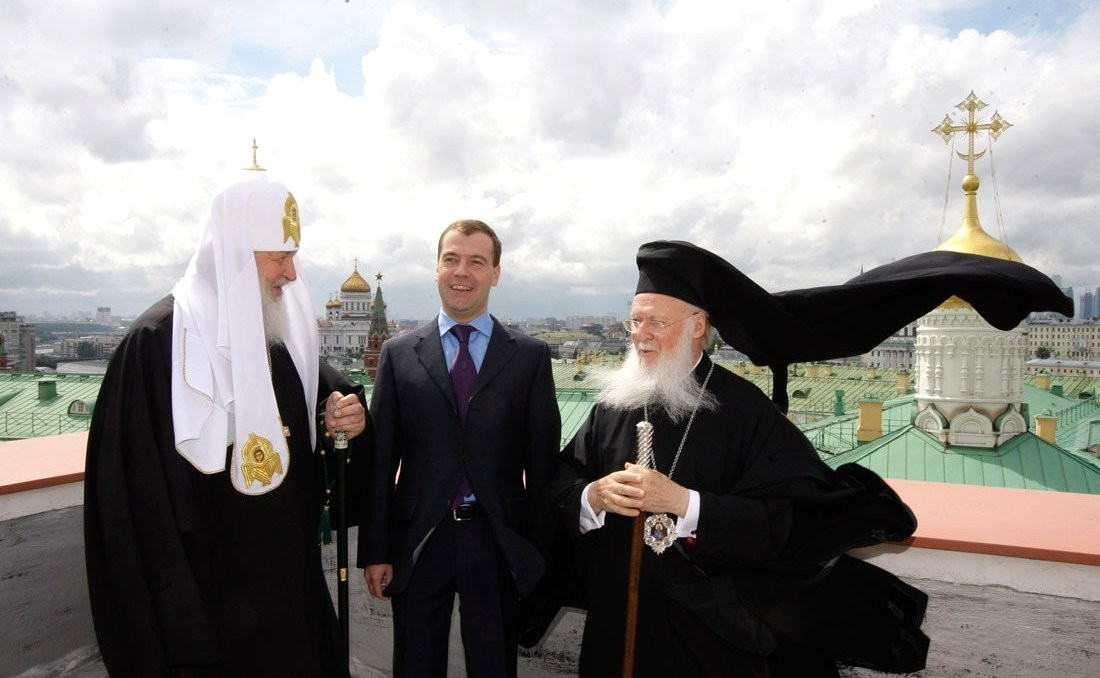
Bartholomew I with Russian president Dmitry Medvedev and Patriarch Kirill of Moscow in 2010.

Bartholomew has criticised both the Russian state and the Russian church over the invasion of Ukraine, calling it a crime of aggression and saying that it has caused enormous suffering both to the Ukrainian and the Russian people. In Ecumenical Patriarch Bartholomew's opinion he says "This is the theology that the sister Church of Russia began to teach, trying to justify an unjust, unholy, unprovoked, diabolical war against a sovereign and independent country – Ukraine".

=== Gaza genocide ===
Bartholomew called Israel's ongoing genocide in Gaza "a disgrace for the human race", and called for a peaceful solution to the situation. He also explicitly condemned the Israeli attack on The Holy Family Church, the sole Roman Catholic parish in Gaza, stating “this was an attack not only on a place of worship, but on a sanctuary where hundreds of people, regardless of their religion, found a home and refuge during this time of trial and tribulation.”

== Distinctions ==
=== National Orders ===
- Finland: Grand Cross of the Order of the Holy Lamb (1993)
- Georgia: Order of the Golden Fleece
- Slovakia: Order of the White Double Cross by President Ivan Gašparovič (27 May 2013)
- Ukraine: Order of Liberty (27 July 2013) and Order of Merit 1st class (5 January 2019)

=== Dynastic Orders ===
- Georgia: Grand Collar of the Order of the Eagle of Georgia (22 October 2011) by Prince David Bagration of Mukhrani at Saint George's chapel.
- Georgia: Order of Saint King David the Psalmist by Prince Nugzar Bagration-Gruzinsky of Georgia (27 August 2015) in a private ceremony in the patriarchal palace

=== Academic ===
Bartholomew received an honorary doctorate from the Hankuk University of Foreign Studies in South Korea on 23 June 2005.

In October 2009, Bartholomew received an honorary doctorate from Fordham University in the United States.

On 19 December 2013, Bartholomew received an honorary doctorate from Bogaziçi University, a college started as a Congregational missionary effort in Istanbul, in recognition of his pioneering initiatives on environmental issues as well as for his efforts in the organization of environmental symposia to address wider audiences and for conveying messages with widespread impact.

Bartholomew received an honorary PhD. from The Hebrew University in Jerusalem on 6 December 2017.

In December 2018, Bartholomew received an honorary doctorate from the National University of Kyiv-Mohyla Academy in Ukraine.

In October 2021, he received an honorary degree from the University of Notre Dame in the United States.

On 6 October 2024, Patriarch Bartholomew received a Doctor of Divinity degree honoris causa from The University of Notre Dame Australia in recognition of his inspiring work to unify contemporary society.

=== Other ===
In 1997, Bartholomew received the Congressional Gold Medal. The Congressional Gold Medal and the Presidential Medal of Freedom are the highest civilian awards given by the United States.

In 2002, he received the Sophie Prize for his work on the environment.

In April 2008, he was included on the Time 100 most influential people in the world list. On 13 March 2007, the third anniversary of the death of Cardinal Franz König, Bartholomew was awarded in Vienna's St. Stephen Cathedral the "Cardinal König Prize" from the Foundation "Communio et Progressio".

In 2012, he received the Four Freedoms Award for the Freedom of Worship.

On 3 December 2013, he received the Global Thinkers Forum 2013 Award for Excellence in Peace and Collaboration.

In 2019, he received the Plaque of St. Erik from the Archbishop of Church of Sweden, for promoting religious freedom, calling attention to the needs of refugees and care for creation.

On 1 November 2021, Bartholomew received the Human Dignity Award from the American Jewish Committee (AJC), a global Jewish advocacy organization. The AJC honor recognizes Bartholomew's singular care for humanity and the environment, exceptional commitment to interreligious coexistence, and indispensable advancement of Orthodox-Jewish relations.

In October 2022, he was one of the first faith leaders to have an audience with King Charles III.

On 17 March 2025, the Institut de France's Academy of Moral and Political Sciences elected him a Foreign Associate Member, giving him a chair formerly held by Pope Benedict XVI.

On 10 April 2025, he was awarded the Templeton Prize for "his pioneering efforts to bridge scientific and spiritual understandings of humanity’s relationship with the natural world, bringing together people of different faiths to heed a call for stewardship of creation."

== See also ==
- Archons of the Ecumenical Patriarchate
- Church of St George, Istanbul
- Ecumenism
- Greek Orthodox Archdiocese of Australia
- Greek Orthodox Archdiocese of America
- History of the Eastern Orthodox Church
- List of current Christian leaders
- List of ecumenical patriarchs of Constantinople
- Mount Athos

Eastern Orthodox Church titles
Preceded by Demetrius I	Ecumenical Patriarch of Constantinople; 1991 – present	Succeeded by Incumbent
