= Eğitim, Kadıköy =

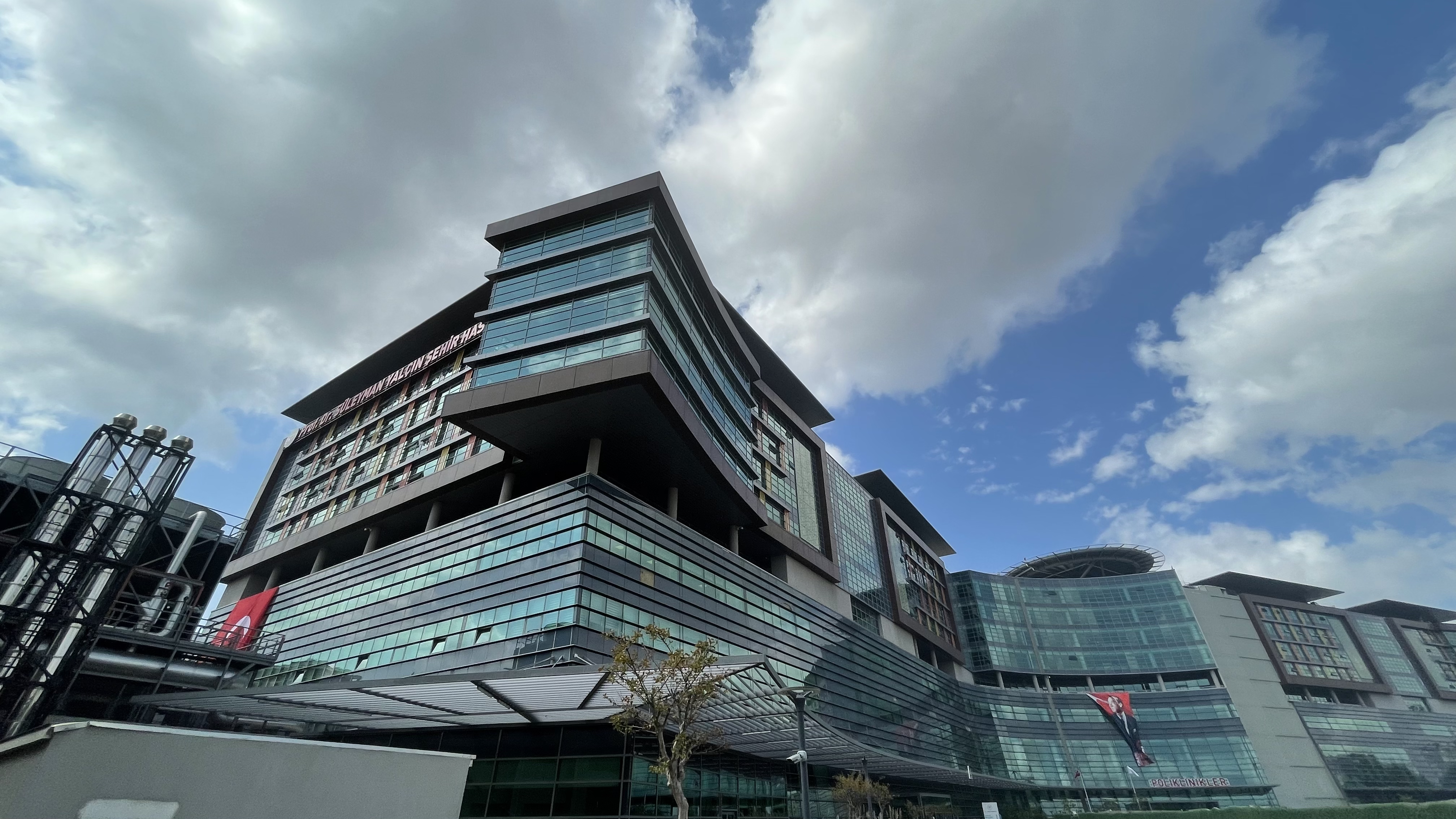
Göztepe Prof. Dr. Süleyman Yalçın City Hospital, Eğitim, Kadıköy, Istanbul

Eğitim is a neighborhood (mahalle) in the Kadıköy district of Istanbul, Turkey. It is located on the Anatolian side of Istanbul. It is bordered on the north by the neighborhoods of Hasanpaşa, Fikirtepe, and Dumlupınar, on the east by the neighborhood of Merdivenköy, on the south by the neighborhoods of Feneryolu and Zühtüpaşa, and on the west again by the neighborhood of Hasanpaşa. Eğitim's population is 13,559 (2020). Much of the eastern half of the neighborhood is taken up by educational institutions, thus apparently the name of the neighborhood, Eğitim (Turkish for "education").

== History ==
The Eğitim area was home to a Neolithic settlement that was part of the Fikirtepe Culture. No settlements, however, are known from the Byzantine and Ottoman periods. Until the 1950s, the only building was an Ottoman hunting lodge, with the rest of the area consisting of pastures and meadows.

In the 1950s, many people from rural Turkey began migrating to Istanbul and building shanties (gecekondu) in the area. Because of the rapid development, a muhtar affiliated with Kadıköy District was appointed in 1965. In 1975, the area was divided into three neighborhoods: Fikirtepe, Dumlupınar, and Eğitim. In the 1980s, municipal services such as roads, water lines, and electricity were brought to the area, and many of the shanties were demolished and replaced with multistory concrete apartment buildings.

== Major institutions ==
- The easternmost end of the neighborhood is occupied by the Göztepe Prof. Dr. Süleyman Yalçın City Hospital, formerly the Göztepe Education and Research Hospital.
- Directly to the west of the hospital is the Göztepe Campus of Marmara University.
- To the north of Marmara University is the Istanbul Atatürk Science High School, Turkey's second oldest science high school.

== Historic sites ==
- Fikirtepe Mound (höyük), a Neolithic settlement, was located near the center of the neighborhood, but has now been built over.
- Near the western end of the neighborhood is the Sultan Murat IV Fountain (çeşme), all that remains of the Murat IV Mansion (köşk).
- Within the Marmara University campus is the Murat V Hunting Lodge Hamam. This building, which was restored in 2017, is all that remains of the complex that included the 1861 Kurbağalıdere Mansion (köşk) and the 1864 Murat V Hunting Lodge (av köşkü).
