= Dumlupınar, Kadıköy =

Dumlupınar is a neighborhood (mahalle) in the district of Kadıköy, on the Anatolian side of Istanbul, Turkey. It has a population of 10,081 (2020). Vertical architecture is increasing as the neighborhood undergoes urban transformation. Dumlupınar is bordered on the north by the Üsküdar neighborhoods of Acıbadem and Ünalan, on the east by the Kadıköy neighborhood of Merdivenköy, on the south by the Kadıköy neighborhood of Eğitim, and on the west by the Kadıköy neighborhoods of Fikirtepe and Hasanpaşa.
