= Acıbadem =

Acıbadem (Turkish for bitter almond) may refer to:

- Acıbadem, Kadıköy, a neighborhood in Kadıköy, İstanbul, Turkey
- Acıbadem, Üsküdar, a neighborhood in Üsküdar, İstanbul, Turkey
- Acıbadem (Metrobus), a station on the Istanbul Metrobus Bus rapid transit line
- Acıbadem Healthcare Group, a Turkish leading institution
- Acıbadem kurabiyesi, Turkish biscuit made of almonds, sugar and egg whites
- Acıbadem University, a private university in Istanbul, Turkey
