= Rasimpaşa, Kadıköy =

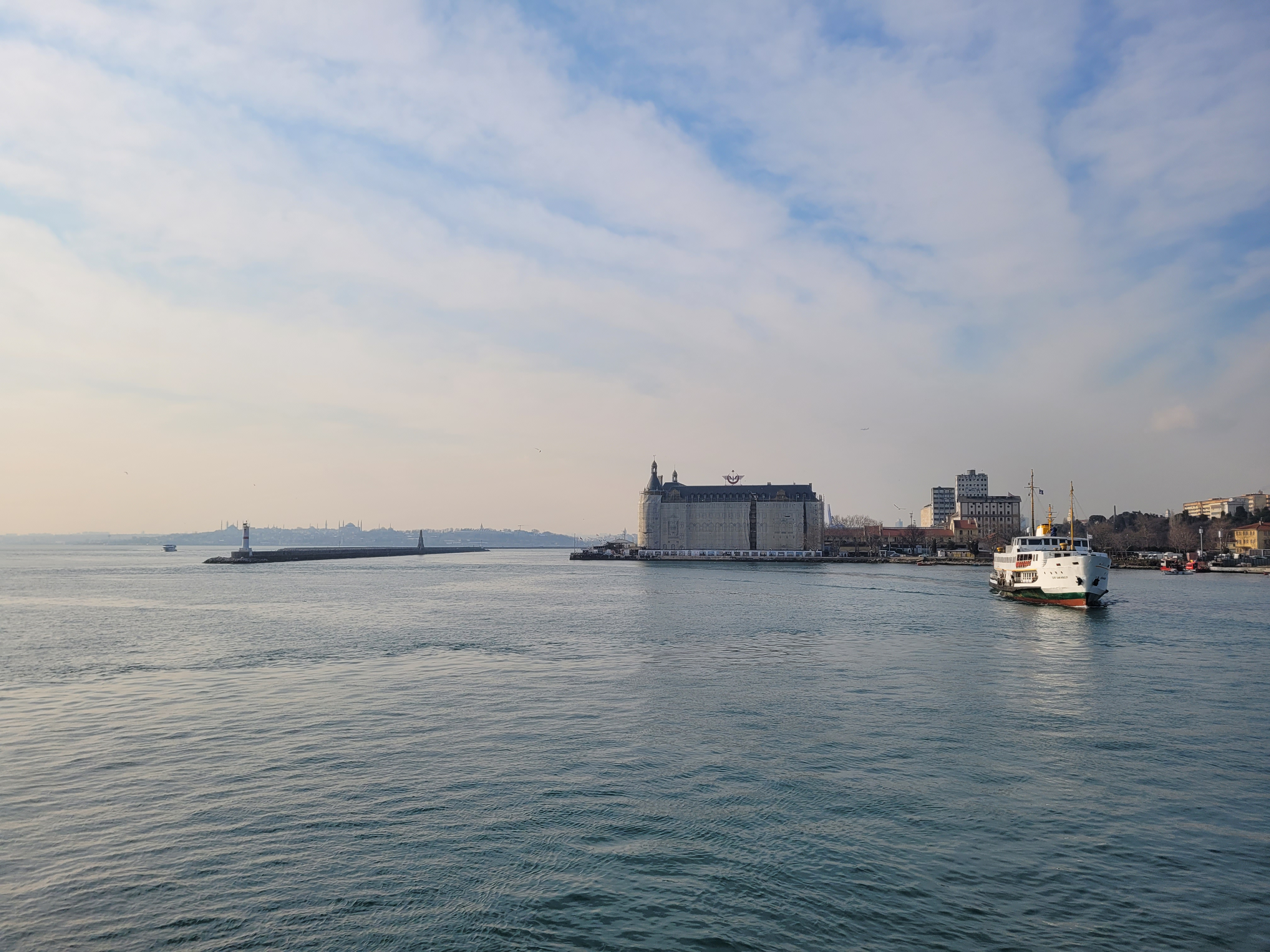
Kadıköy Bay, Haydarpaşa Breakwater, and Haydarpaşa Train Station, Rasimpaşa, Kadıköy, Istanbul

Rasimpaşa is a neighborhood (mahalle) in the district of Kadıköy, Istanbul, Turkey. The population is 12,341 (2020). Rasimpaşa is an important historical neighborhood, much of which is registered as an Urban and Historical Protected Area. The neighborhood also includes the Haydarpaşa Train Station and Haydarpaşa Port.

Rasimpaşa is bordered on the north by the district of Üsküdar, on the east by the Kadıköy neighborhoods of Koşuyolu, Acıbadem, and Hasanpaşa, on the south by Kadıköy neighborhoods of Hasanpaşa and Osmanağa, and on the west by Kadıköy Bay and Haydarpaşa Port in the Bosporus.

== Historic sites ==
- excavations of the area of the western port of ancient Chalcedon (ongoing as of 2025), with findings going back to the 6th century BCE
- the Ayrılık Çeşmesi ("Parting Fountain"), built sometime after 1590 by Gazanfer Ağa at a place where travelers set off for eastward journeys; restored in 1741 by Babüssaade Ağası Ahmed Ağa; restored in 1921 by Dürriye Sultan
- the Ayrılık Çeşmesi Open-Air Prayer Space (namazgâh), uncovered during excavations in 2010
- the Ayrılık Çeşmesi Cemetery, a branch of the Karacaahmet Cemetery, now separated from the main cemetery because of construction over the centuries; includes burials from the late 18th to early 20th centuries
- the Aziziye Hamam, built toward the end of the reign of Abdülaziz (r. 1861-1876)
- the Haydarpaşa Breakwater, built in 1899 as part of preparations for the construction of the Haydarpaşa Train Station; the breakwater includes a monument to Abdülhamit II, added in 1902
- the Hemdat İsrael Synagogue, built in 1899
- the Rasim Paşa Mosque, built in 1902 by İkbal Hanım in memory of her husband Rasim Paşa, Minister of the Ottoman Navy
- the Haydarpaşa Train Station, built 1906-1908, as the starting point for an Istanbul-Baghdad line, restoration ongoing (as of 2025) after a 2010 fire
- the Haydarpaşa Ferry Station, built possibly in 1917-18 (or built at the time of the Haydarpaşa Train Station and repaired in 1917-18)
