= Feneryolu =

- Neighbourhood
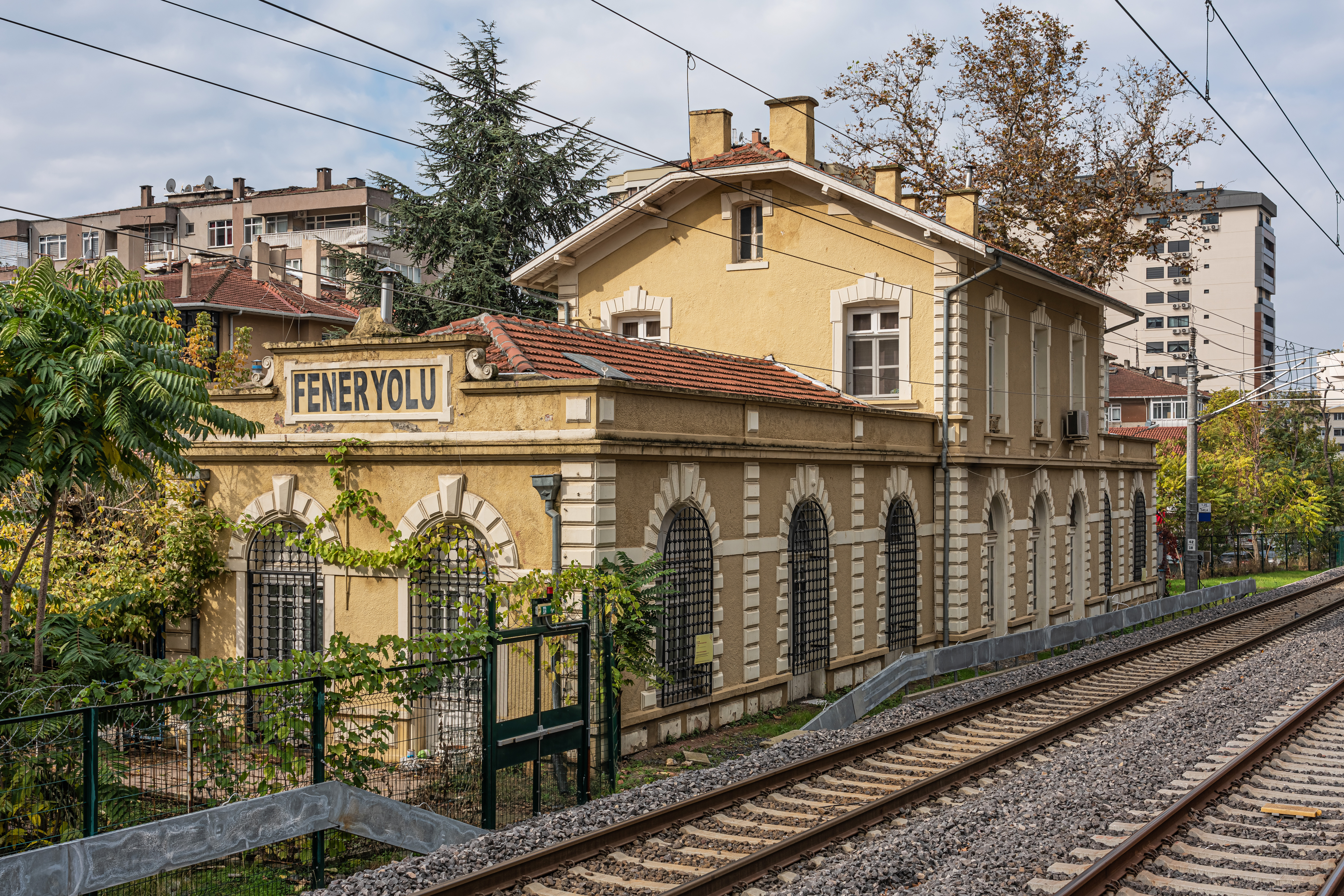
- The out of use historical railway station

- Location within Turkey Location within Istanbul
- Coordinates: 40.98194°N 29.04944°E
- Country: Turkey
- Province: Istanbul
- District: Kadıköy
- Area: 1.0 km^{2} (0.39 sq mi)
- Population (2023): 25,626
  - Density: 26,000/km^{2} (66,000/sq mi)
- Time zone: UTC+3 (TRT)
- Postal code: 34724
- Area code: 0216

Feneryolu is a neighbourhood in the Kadıköy district of Istanbul, Turkey. It covers an area of approximately 1.0 km². Located just inland from the Marmara Sea, Feneryolu is situated between the coastal neighbourhood of Fenerbahçe and the residential area of Fikirtepe. The name Feneryolu (literally "lighthouse road") is believed to refer to the historic route leading to the Fenerbahçe Lighthouse.

It is bordered on the north by the Kadıköy neighborhood of Merdivenköy, on the east by the Kadıköy neighborhood of Göztepe, on the south by Bağdat Avenue and the Kadıköy neighborhood of Fenerbahçe, and on the west by the Kadıköy neighborhood of Zühtüpaşa.

The neighbourhood benefits from public transportation links, notably the Marmaray commuter rail network via its railway station and local bus services provided by İETT. Feneryolu's borders extend from the countrywide famous shopping street Bağdat Avenue to the major avenue of "Minibus Street" (Fahrettin Kerim Gökay Avenue).

== History ==
Origins of Feneryolu date back to the late Ottoman period when the area served as a modest transit hub. The neighbourhood’s development was closely linked to the establishment of the Feneryolu railway station in the late 19th century. The opening of a branch railway line from Feneryolu to Fenerbahçe led to connection with the coastal resorts of Kadıköy. Over the decades, most of the simple wooden houses were demolished to make way for apartments, and Feneryolu gradually evolved into a fully residential area. It is still possible to come across some of the old houses and mansions.

== Population ==
Modern Feneryolu is predominantly residential. It has quiet and peaceful streets, with a population consisting mainly of students and retirees—2020 population: 25,626.

== Historic sites ==
Historic sites of Feneryolu include

- the Tuğlacıbaşı Mosque, built in 1860 by Hacı Mustafa Efendi, head of a brickyard (tuğlacıbaşı) in Kâğıthane
- the Feneryolu Train Station, built in 1872 by the Ottoman Ministry of Public Works, rebuilt in 1901 by the Anatolian Railway, rebuilt again in 2019
- the Şehzade Abdülkadir Efendi Mansion, built by the lawyer Fevzi Bey in 1900, sold to Şehzade Abdülkadir Efendi in 1910, sold to İkbal Hanım in 1924
- the Haldun Taner Museum House, built in 1910 as a guardhouse for a garden belonging to Fuat "the Mad" Paşa, restored in 2018 for use as a museum
