= Koşuyolu, Kadıköy =

Koşuyolu
- Neighbourhood
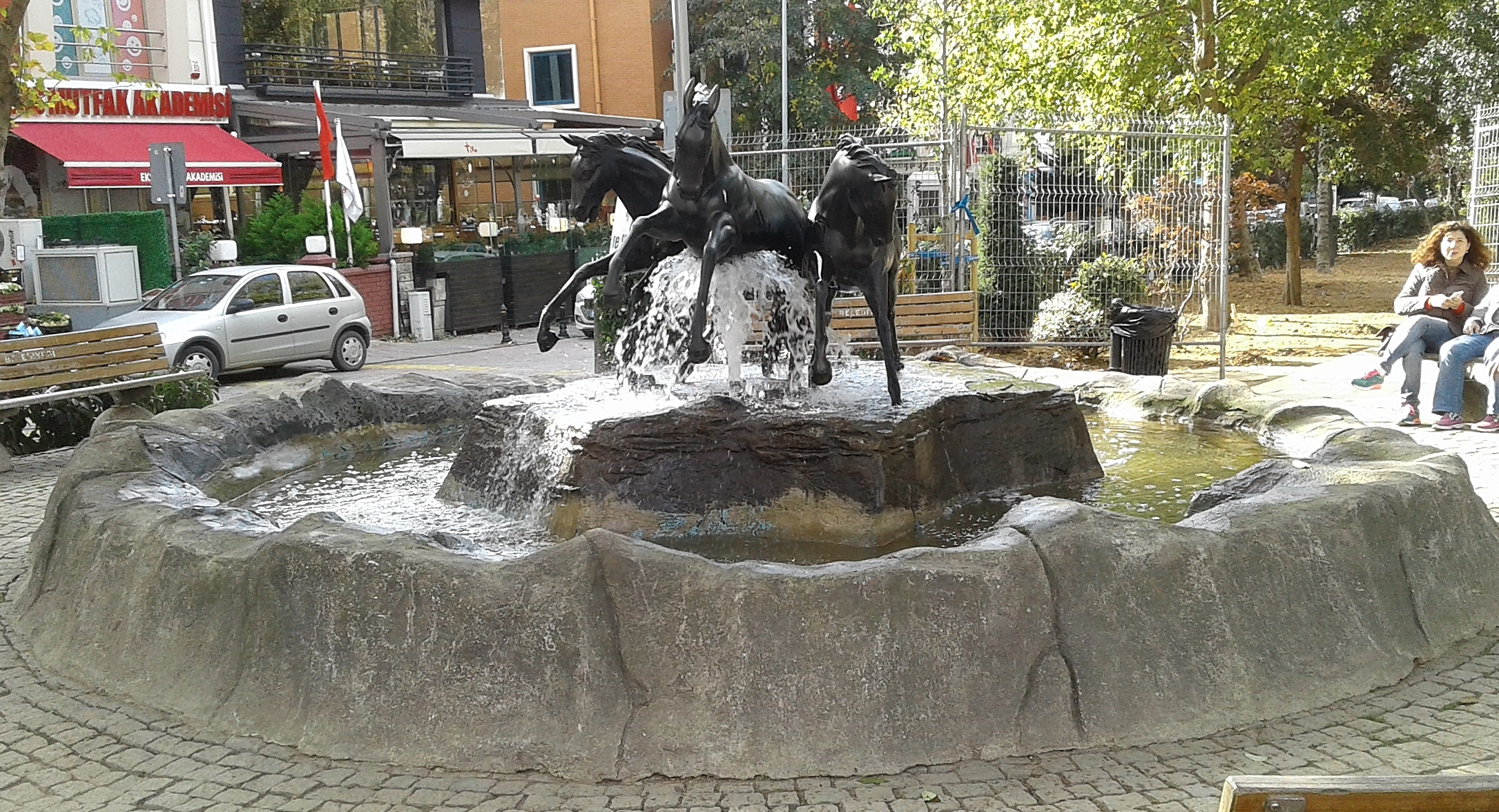
- Koşuyolu Park

- Location within Turkey Location within Istanbul
- Coordinates: 41.0066°N 29.0262°E
- Country: Turkey
- Province: Istanbul
- District: Kadıköy
- Population (2022): 6,912
- Time zone: UTC+3 (TRT)

Koşuyolu is a neighborhood in the municipality and district of Kadıköy, Istanbul Province, Turkey. It is on the Anatolian side of the city and is bordered on the northwest and northeast by the district of Üsküdar, on the east and southeast by the Kadıköy neighborhood of Acıbadem, and on the southwest by the Kadıköy neighborhood of Rasimpaşa. Its population is 6,912 (2022).

== History ==
The valley that runs through present day Koşuyolu is said to have been a racecourse in ancient times, and the area may have been hunting grounds during Byzantine times or may have been used for horse races.

In 1588, Kızlarağası İbrahim Ağa built a small mosque, a fountain, and a namazgah (open-air place for prayers) at the south end of what is now the Koşuyolu neighborhood. This was the only permanent settlement in the vicinity for many years.

Hunting and horse racing probably continued during Ottoman times. Because of a three-day ceremony of games organized by Pehlivan İbrahim Paşa (Baba Paşa) in the early 19th century, the area is said to have been named Koşu Yeri (“running place”). The meadows of the area were used as pasture for the horses of the Ottoman palace and army and as a military training ground.

Residential development of the area began in 1951, with the Koşuyolu Emlak Bank Houses, a large development of low-rise houses.

Since the 1960s, green areas in the neighborhood have decreased while building density has increased. The profile of residents has also changed, from lower- and middle-income groups to upper middle- and upper-income groups.
