= Kozyatağı =

- Neighbourhood
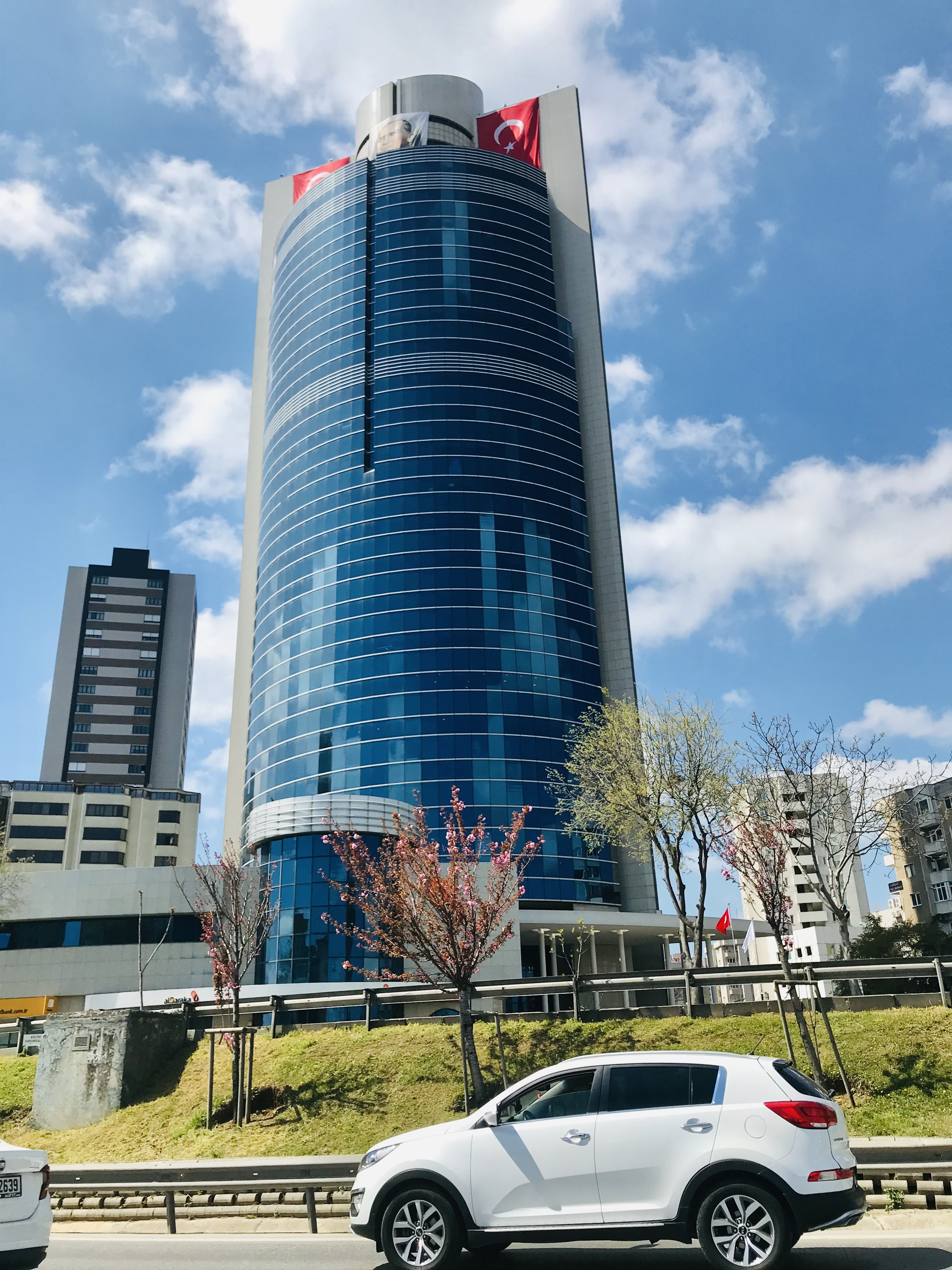
- Nidakule is one of the highest office buildings in Kozyatağı, Istanbul

- Location of Kozyatağı in Kadıköy

- Location within Turkey Location within Istanbul
- Coordinates: 40.969°N 29.0865°E
- Country: Turkey
- Province: Istanbul
- District: Kadıköy
- Population (2022): 37,743
- Time zone: UTC+3 (TRT)

Kozyatağı is a neighborhood in the municipality and district of Kadıköy, Istanbul Province, Turkey. Its population is 37,743 (2022). It is bordered on the northeast by the D.100 Highway and the Ataşehir neighborhood of İçerenköy, on the southeast by the Kadıköy neighborhood of Bostancı, on the southwest by the Kadıköy neighborhood of Suadiye, and on the northwest by the Kadıköy neighborhood of 19 Mayıs.

== Name ==
The name of the neighborhood is said to have come from walnut trees that were once abundant in the area (Turkish: koz ("walnut") + yatak ("bed").

== History ==
In Ottoman times, the region that now includes Kozyatağı was made up of farms and farming villages, with a significant Turkish population. In the 19th century, even though a few mansions were built in the area, the development taking place in the neighborhoods to the south, near the Sea of Marmara, did not come to Kozyatağı. Nevertheless, the population grew enough that in 1906 Kozyatağı was separated from İçerenköy and officially established as a neighborhood on its own.

With new transportation links, such as the Ankara Road (now the D.100) in the 1950s and the connection to the Fatih Sultan Mehmet Bridge in the 1980s, much construction came to the neighborhood. In 1991, Kozyatağı was split into the 19 Mayıs and Kozyatağı neighborhoods.

== Notable features ==
- the Old Kozyatağı or Abdülhalim Mosque, built possibly in 1871, as a tekke of the Rufâi order, converted into a mosque in 1926, repaired in 1955 and 2015, now used as a Quran school for women
- the Modern Kozyatağı or Mehmet Çavuş Mosque, opened in 1997
- the Kozyatağı Culture Center, opened in 2010
- the Kozyatağı Metro Station, opened in 2012 (since 2024, officially known as Pegasus-Kozyatağı)

== Transport ==
The M4 and the M8 metro lines run through Kozyatağı, along with many bus lines and minibuses. It is also easily accessible by the D-100 highway. Kozyatağı is landlocked, but ferries in Kadıköy and Bostancı can be reached easily.

== Surroundings ==
The area consists of mainly residential apartments along with many commercial towers and plazas. High-rise buildings are not common in the Anatolian side except Fikirtepe, Kozyatağı, Ataşehir and a few more areas. There are also many parks and green areas along with a shopping mall.
