= Fikirtepe =

- Neighbourhood
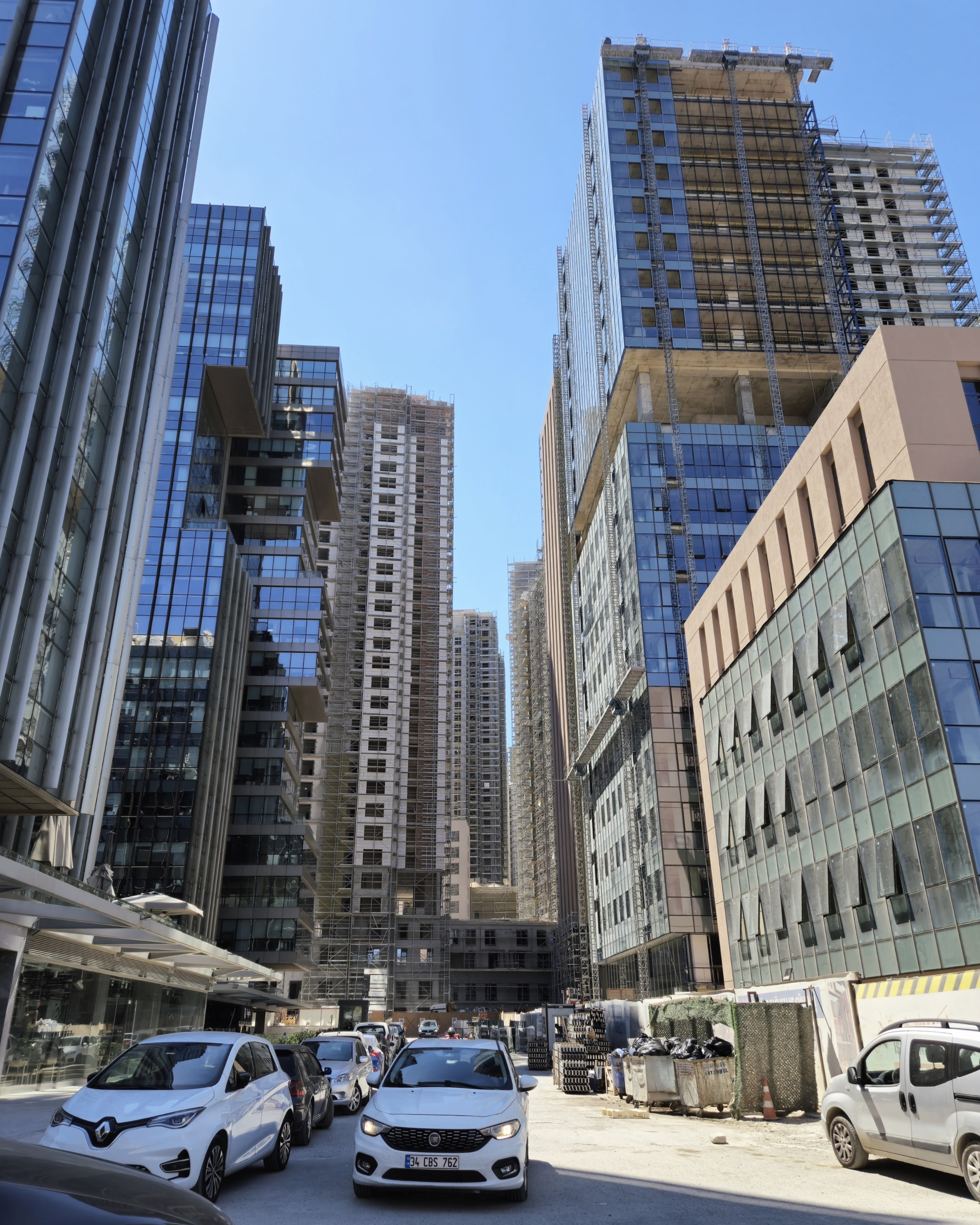
- Skyscrapers in Fikirtepe
- Interactive map of Fikirtepe
- Location within Turkey
- Coordinates: 40.9932°N 29.0519°E
- Country: Turkey
- Province: Istanbul
- District: Kadıköy
- Time zone: UTC+3 (TRT)

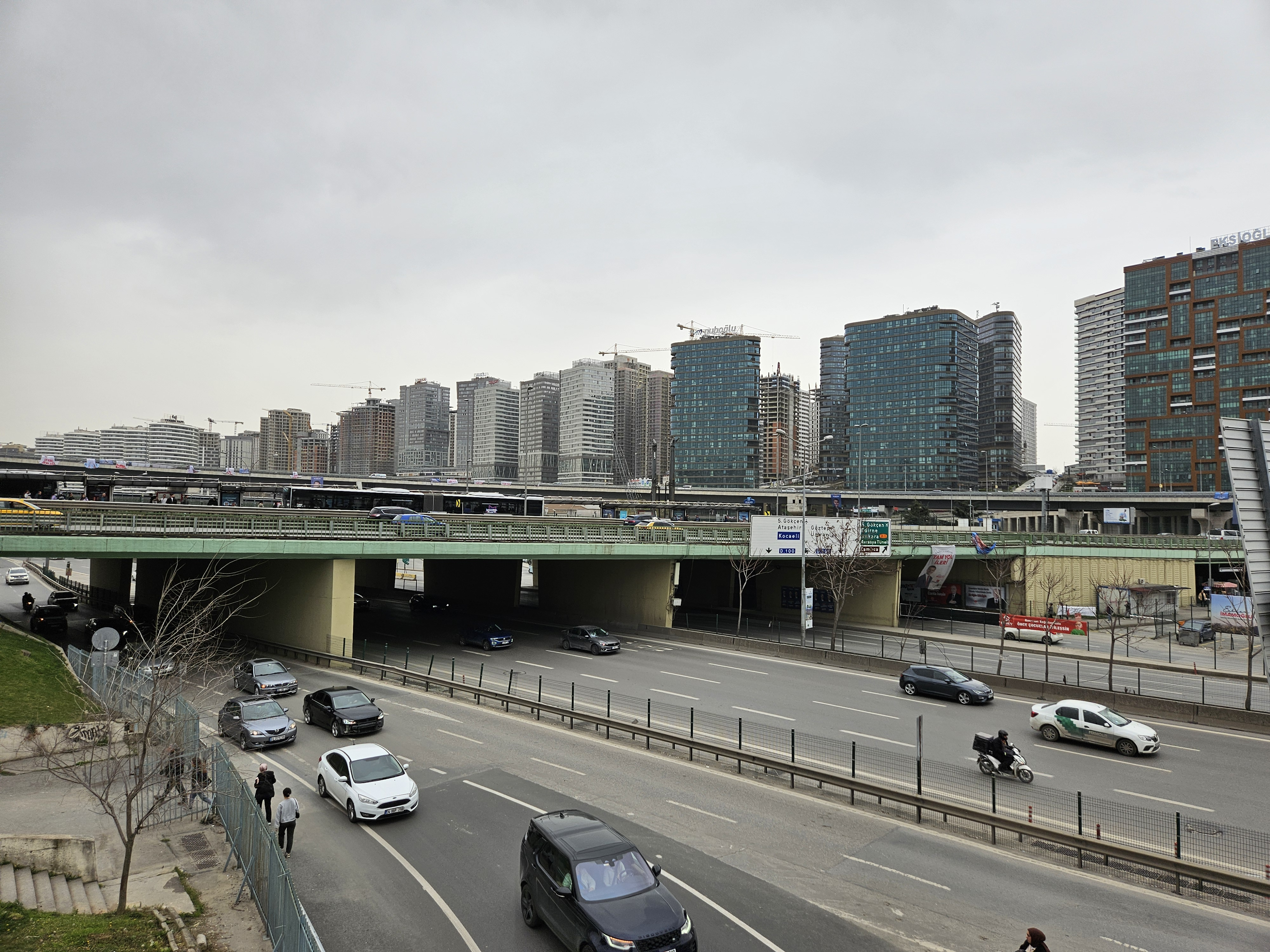
Fikirtepe construction sites viewed from the Akasya Shopping Mall perspective.

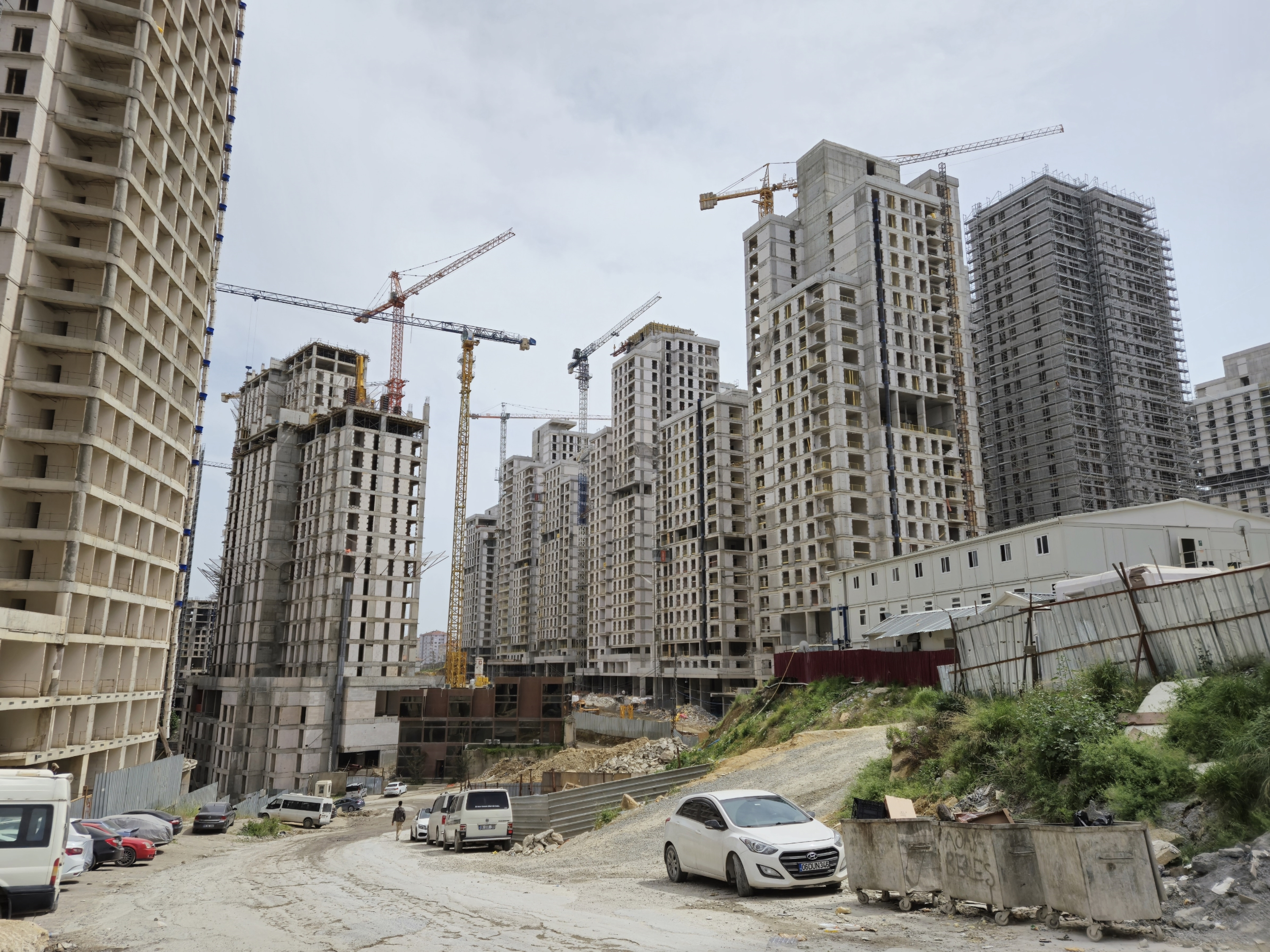
Urban development in Fikirtepe, Kadıköy, Istanbul

Fikirtepe is a neighborhood (mahalle) in the district of Kadıköy, on the Anatolian side of Istanbul, Turkey. It is built over one of the oldest settlement areas of Istanbul, dating back to the Neolithic period. The population is 12,235 (2020). The neighborhood is bordered on the east by the Kadıköy neighborhood of Dumlupınar, on the south by the Kadıköy neighborhood of Eğitim, and on the northwest and north by the Kuşdili Stream and the Kadıköy neighborhood of Hasanpaşa. Fikirtepe is divided by the O-1 Highway, which runs southwest to northeast through the neighborhood. It is now composed of highrises after an urban transformation project, unlike its surroundings.

== Name ==
Fikirtepe literally means "Idea Hill" (Turkish: fikir + tepe) and has been in use since at least 1786. According to popular legend, the name comes from a dervish named Fikir Baba.

Namık Kemal used a variation of the legend in speaking of the intellectual meetings held by Young Ottomans at the mansion of Crown Prince Murat: "A saint is said to have lived in this neighborhood centuries ago. ... His name was Fikir Dede ... so people called the area Fikirdede or Fikir'in Tepesi (Fikir's Hill). ... For a long time we have been putting forward new ideas on this hill. ... Let us call this place Fikirtepesi (Idea Hill)."

== History ==
The Fikirtepe area was home to a Neolithic settlement that was part of the Fikirtepe Culture. The Fikirtepe Mound (höyük) was once located in the nearby Eğitim neighborhood, but has since been built over.

No settlements are known from the Byzantine and Ottoman periods. Until the 1950s, the only building was an Ottoman hunting lodge, with the rest of the area consisting of pastures and meadows.

In the 1950s, many people from rural Turkey began migrating to Istanbul and building shanties (gecekondu) in the area. Because of the rapid development, a muhtar affiliated with Kadıköy District was appointed in 1965. In 1975, the area was divided into three neighborhoods: Fikirtepe, Dumlupınar, and Eğitim. In the 1980s, municipal services such as roads, water lines, and electricity were brought to the area, and many of the shanties were demolished and replaced with multistory concrete apartment buildings.
