= Kadıköy =

District in the Asian side of Istanbul, Turkey

Kadıköy Χαλκηδόνα
- District and municipality
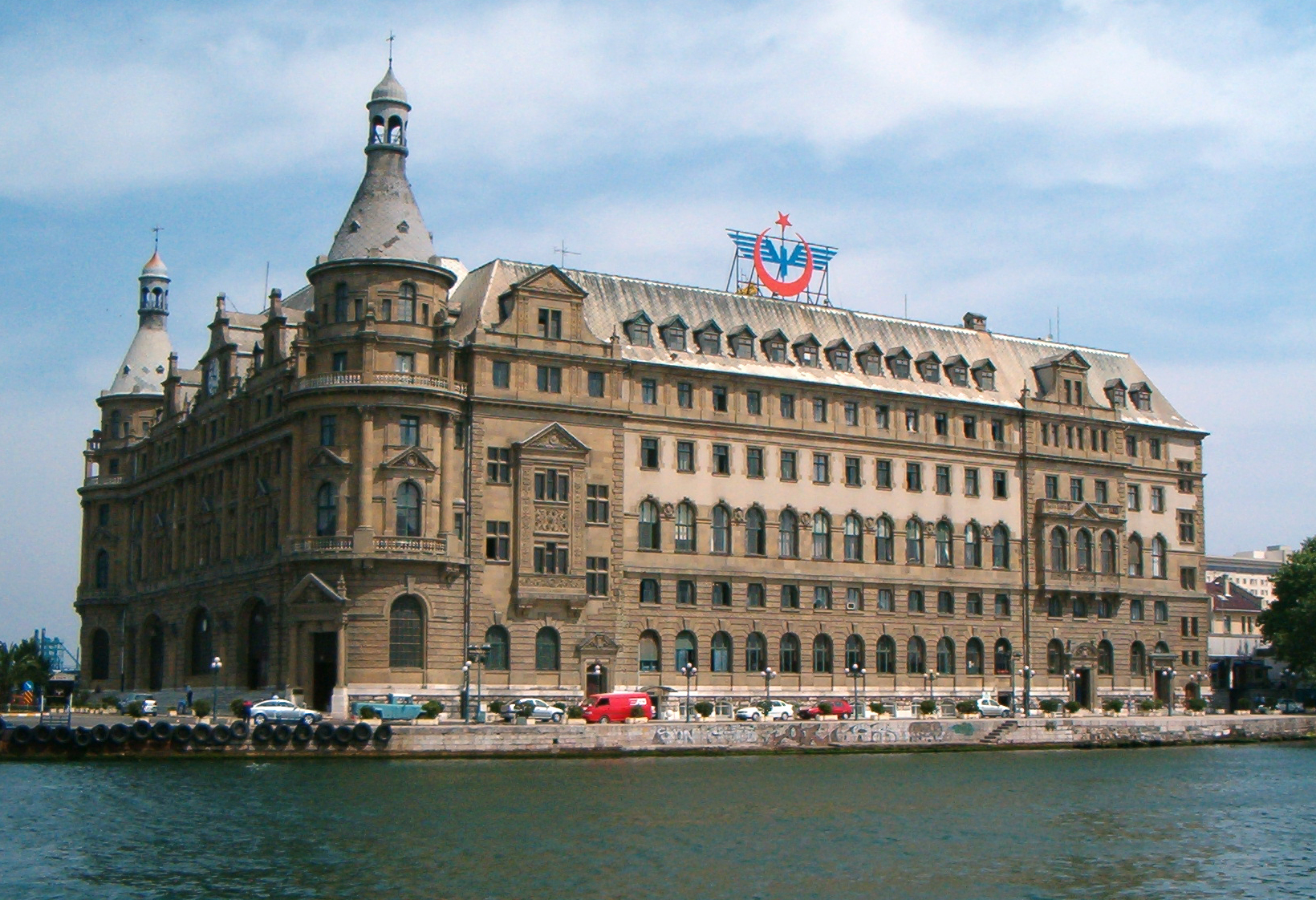
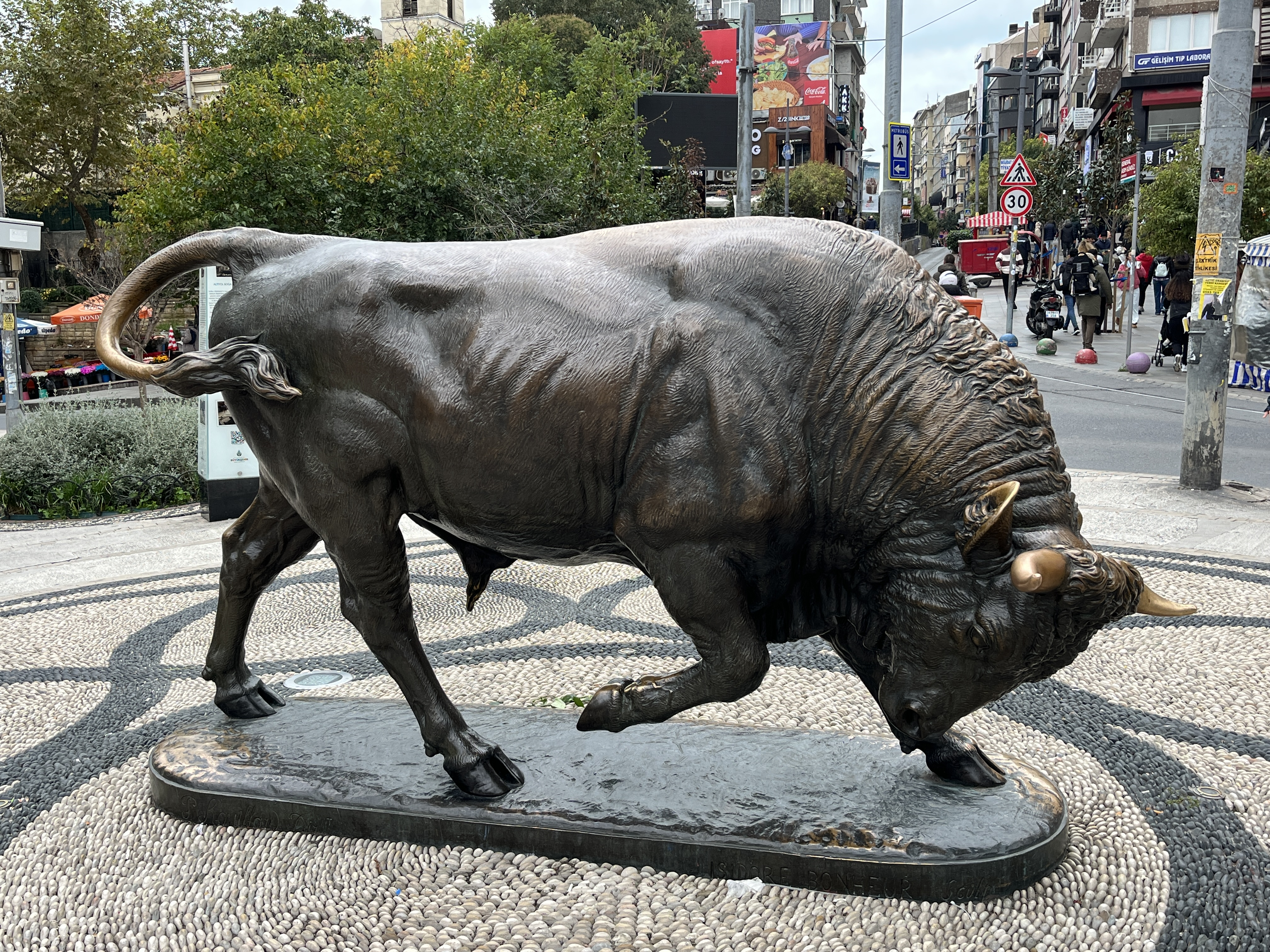
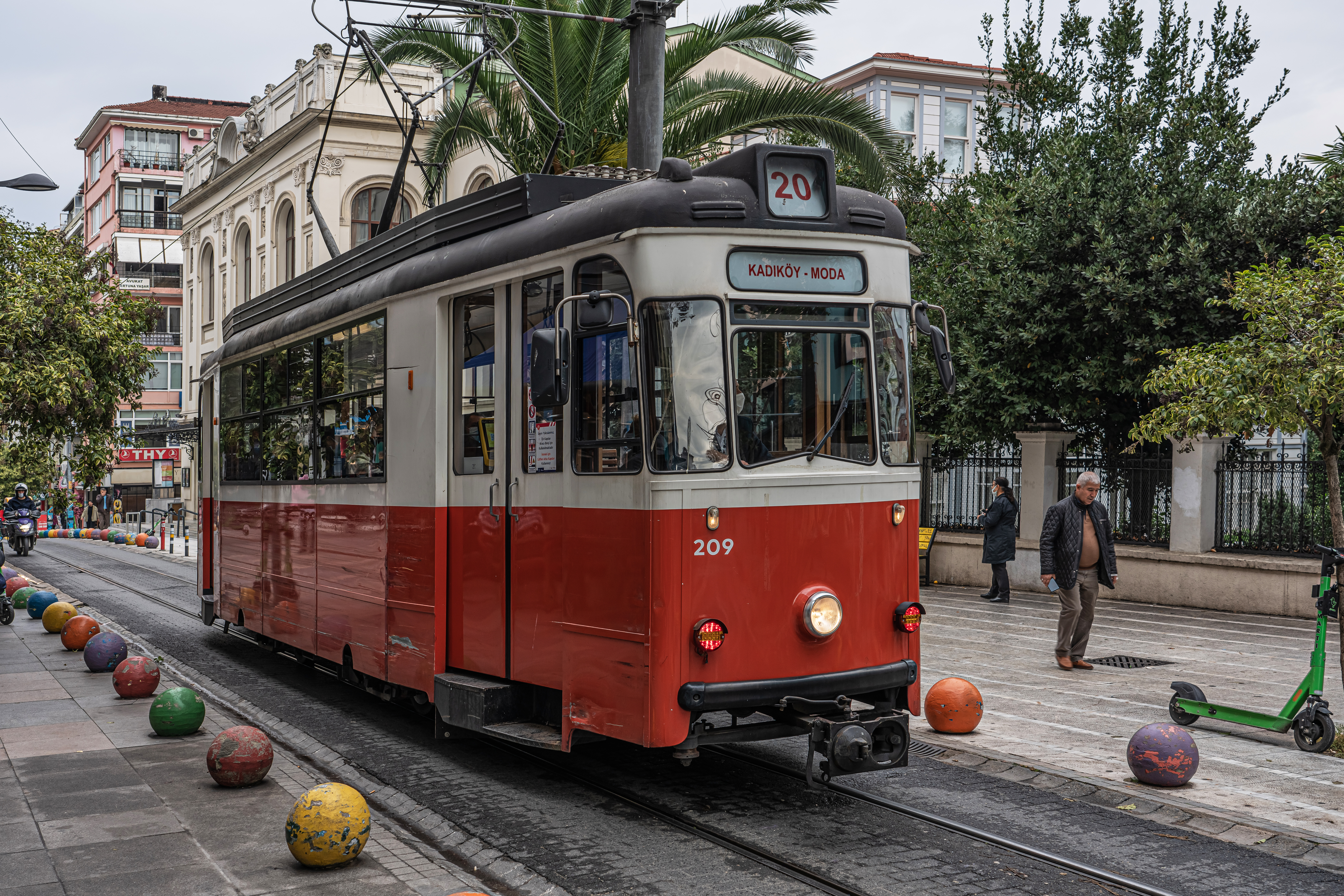
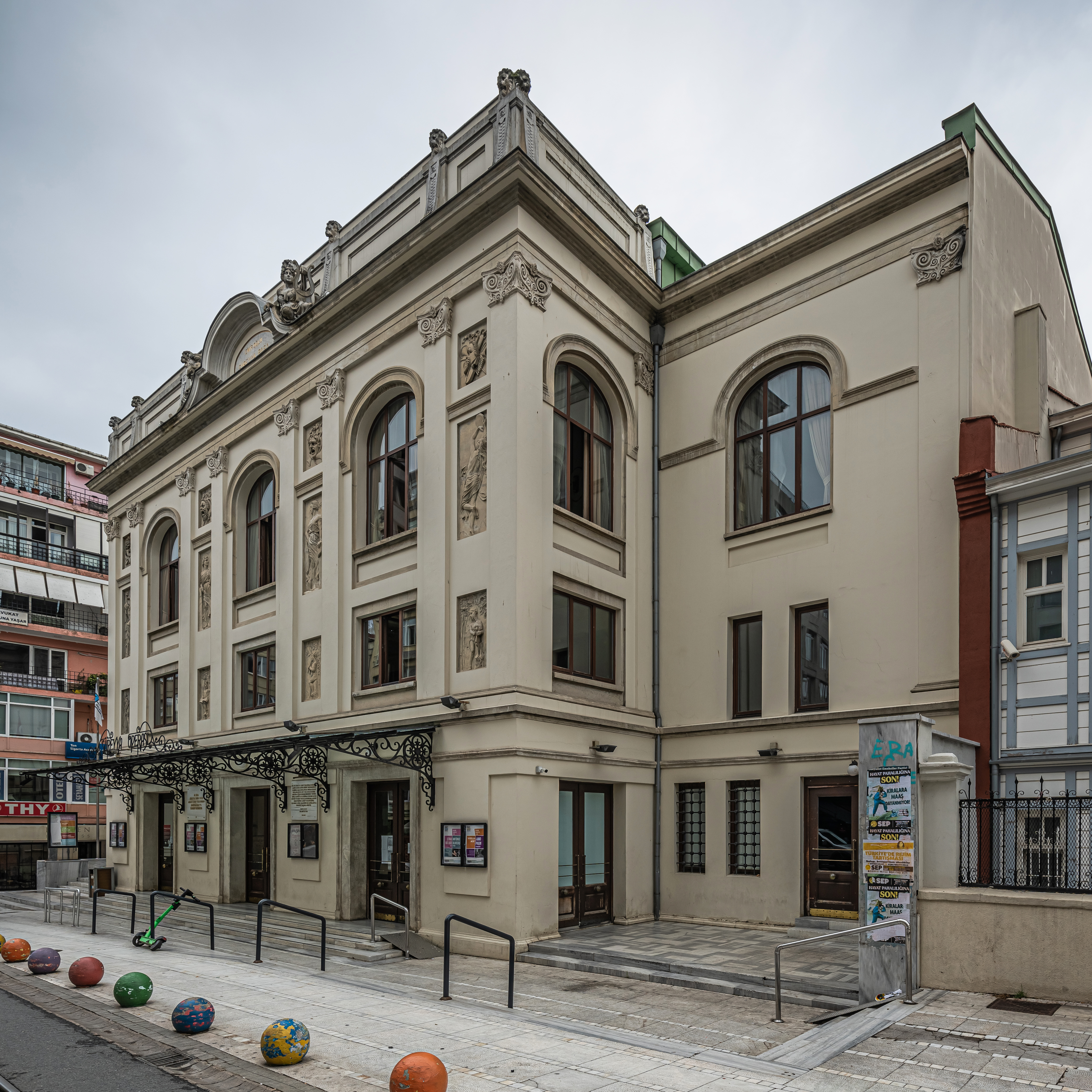
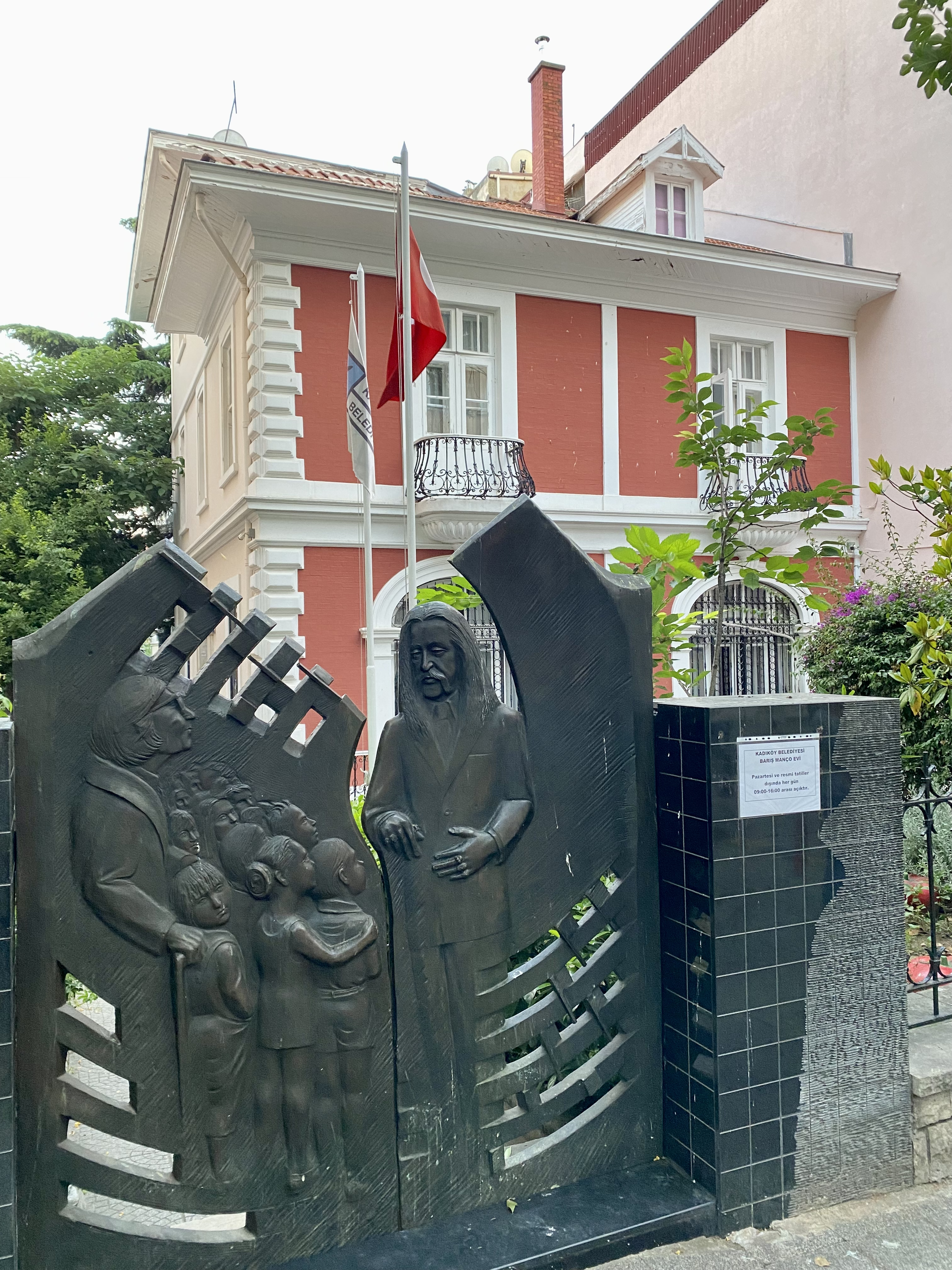
- Clockwise from top: Haydarpaşa railway station, Nostalgic tram (T3 line), Barış Manço House, Süreyya Opera House and Kadıköy bull statue

- Logo

- Map showing Kadıköy District in Istanbul Province

- Location within Turkey Location within Istanbul
- Coordinates: 40°59′36.2″N 29°02′14.5″E
- Country: Turkey
- Province: Istanbul

Government
  - Mayor: Mesut Kösedağı (New Party)
- Area: 25 km^{2} (9.7 sq mi)
- Population (2023): 467,919
  - Density: 19,000/km^{2} (48,000/sq mi)
- Time zone: UTC+3 (TRT)
- Postal code: 34710
- Area code: 0216
- Website: www.kadikoy.bel.tr

Kadıköy (Turkish pronunciation: [kaˈdɯkøj]) is a municipality and district in Istanbul Province, Turkey. Its area is 25 km^{2}, and its population is 467,919 (2023). It is a large and populous area in the Asian side of Istanbul, on the northern shore of the Sea of Marmara. It partially faces the historic city centre of Constantinople (modern Fatih) on the European side of the Bosporus. It is bordered by the districts of Üsküdar, to the northwest, Ataşehir, to the northeast, and Maltepe, to the southeast.

Kadıköy was known in classical antiquity and during the Roman and Byzantine eras as Chalcedon (Greek: Χαλκηδών). Chalcedon was known as the 'city of the blind'. The settlement has been under control of many empires, finally being taken by the Ottomans before the fall of Constantinople. At first, Chalcedon was rural, but with time it urbanized. Kadıköy separated from the Üsküdar district in 1928.

One of the most expensive places in Istanbul, Kadıköy is a residential and commercial area that, with its numerous bars, cinemas and bookshops, is the liberal cultural centre of the Anatolian side of Istanbul. Kadıköy contains the Bağdat Avenue, which is one of the most significant shopping streets in Turkey and it spans through the entirety of the district. Some main transportation routes connecting various districts of Istanbul pass through Kadıköy.

While the borders of the district extend from Bostancı to Koşuyolu, the central town which gives its name to the district encompasses only the limited area made up of the Rasimpaşa, Osmanağa, and Caferağa neighbourhoods. Outside of the centre, it is possible to see calmer, highly developed seaside settlements such as Caddebostan and Fenerbahçe. The most populated neighbourhoods of the district apart from the core of Kadıköy are Göztepe and Kozyatağı.

Kadıköy ranked 1st place in Human Development Index out of the 188 most populated districts in Turkey.

== Etymology ==
Previously known as Chalcedon during ancient and Byzantine times, it was renamed Kadıköy following the 1453 Ottoman conquest . The name literally translates to 'Village of the Judge,' referring to Istanbul's first judge, Hızır Bey, who was granted the area's jurisdiction.

== History ==
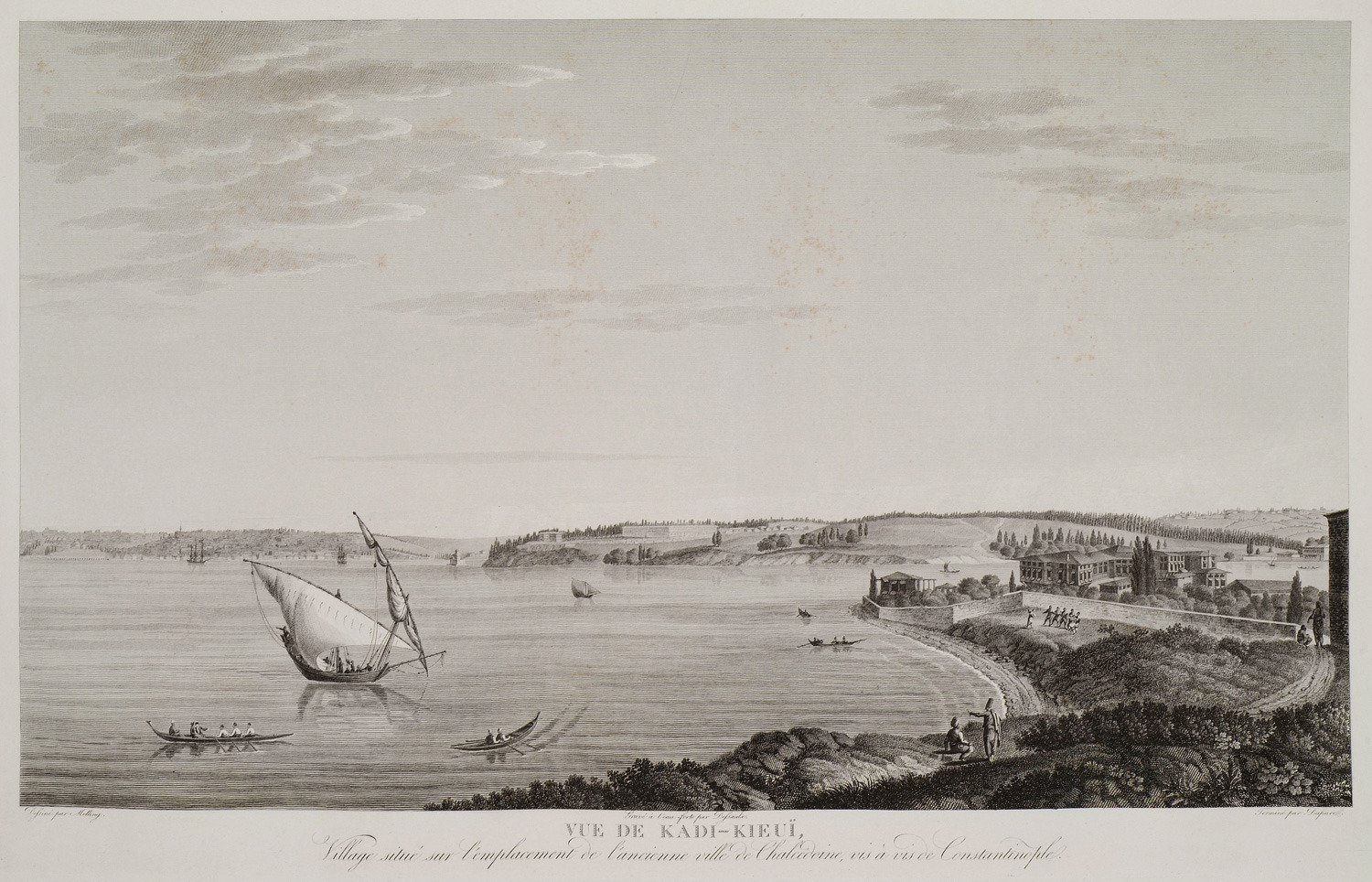
View of Kadıköy, a village located on the site of the ancient city of Chalcedon, opposite Constantinople - Melling Antoine Ignace - 1819.

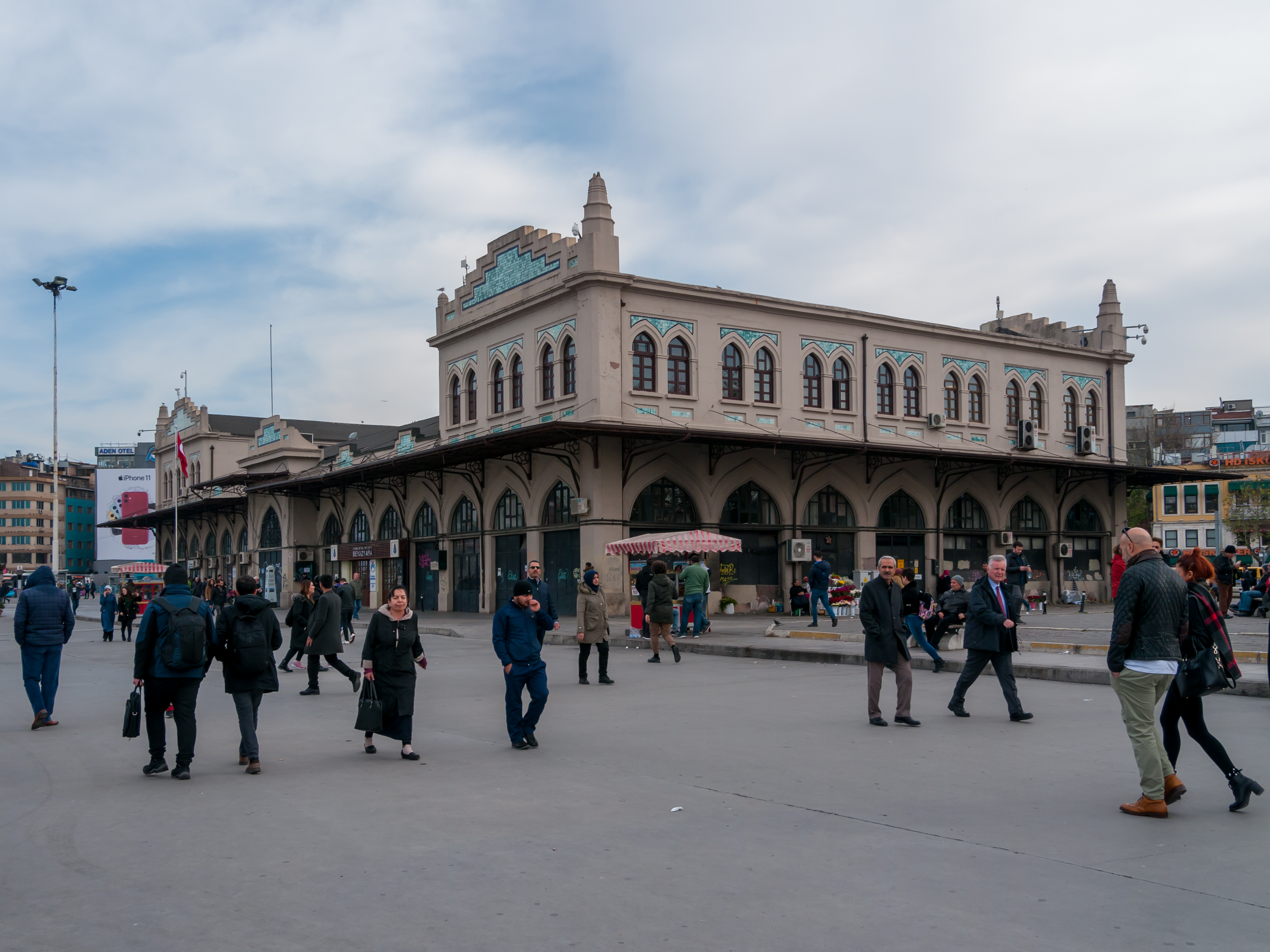
Kadıköy Haldun Taner Stage near the ferry port of Kadıköy

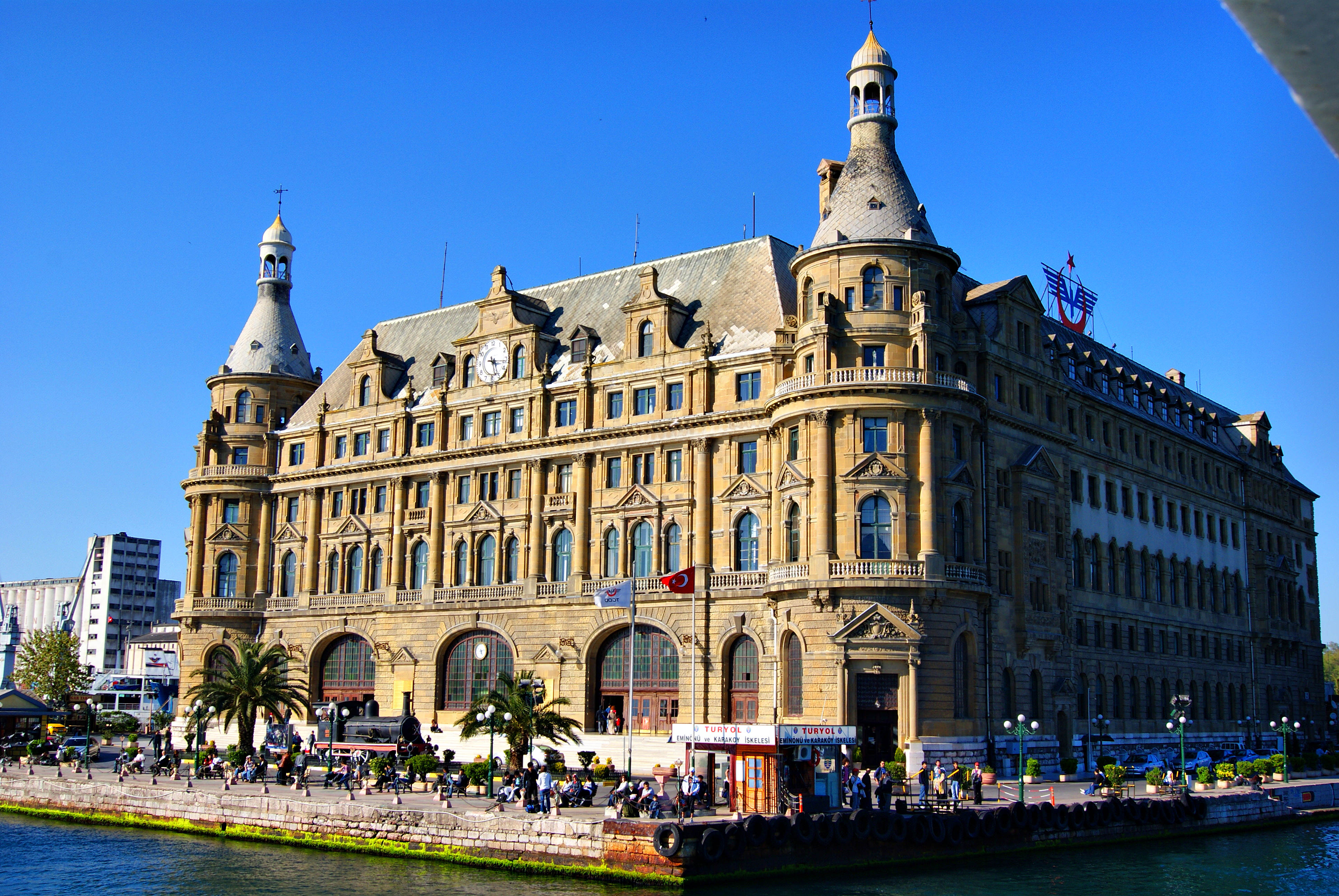
Haydarpaşa Terminal of the Turkish State Railways, near Kadıköy centrum

Kadıköy is an older settlement than most of those on the Anatolian side of the city of Istanbul. Relics dating to 5500–3500 BC (Chalcolithic period) have been found at the Fikirtepe Mound, and articles of stone, bone, ceramic, jewelry and bronze show that there has been a continuous settlement since prehistoric times. A port settlement dating from the Phoenicians has also been discovered. Chalcedon was the first settlement that the Greeks from Megara established on the Bosphorus, in 685 BC, a few years before they established Byzantium on the other side of the strait in 667 BC. Towns such as Rouphinianai and Poleatikon were located in Chalcedon.

Chalcedon became known as the 'city of the blind', the story being that Byzantium was founded following a prophecy that a great capital would be built 'opposite the city of the blind' (meaning that the people of Chalcedon must have been blind not to see the obvious value of the peninsula on the Golden Horn as a natural defensive harbour). The fourth ecumenical church council, Council of Chalcedon, was held there in 451 AD.

Chalcedon changed hands time and time again, as Persians, Bithynians, Romans, Byzantines, Arabs, Crusaders, and Turks passed through the area, which was badly damaged during the Fourth Crusade and came into Ottoman hands in 1353, a full century before Constantinople. Thus, Kadıköy has the oldest mosque in Istanbul, built almost a century before the conquest of Constantinople in 1453.

At the time of the conquest, Chalcedon was a rural settlement outside the protection of the city. It was soon put under the jurisdiction of the Constantinople courts, hence the name Kadıköy, which means Village of the Judge. In the Ottoman period, Kadıköy became a market for agricultural goods and in time developed into a residential area for people who would commute to the city by boat.

According to Ottoman estimations of 1882, the district of Kadıköy had a total population of 6,733, consisting of 2,695 Muslims, 1,831 Armenians, 1,822 Greeks, 249 Jews, 92 Latins, 28 Bulgarians and 16 Catholics.

Kadıköy became a district in 1928 when it was separated from Üsküdar district. The neighbourhoods of Bostancı and Suadiye were also separated from the district of Kartal in the same year, and eventually joined the newly formed district of Kadıköy.

== Geography ==
=== Composition ===
There are 21 neighbourhoods in Kadıköy District:

- 19 Mayıs
- Acıbadem
- Bostancı
- Caddebostan
- Caferağa
- Dumlupınar
- Eğitim
- Erenköy
- Fenerbahçe
- Feneryolu
- Fikirtepe
- Göztepe
- Hasanpaşa
- Koşuyolu
- Kozyatağı
- Merdivenköy
- Osmanağa
- Rasimpaşa
- Sahraycıedit
- Suadiye
- Zühtüpaşa

=== Transport ===
The major Haydarpaşa Terminal of the Turkish State Railways is located close to Kadıköy's centre and was opened in 1908 as the terminus of the Istanbul-Baghdad and Istanbul-Damascus-Medina railways. The terminal closed due to infrastructure works in 2013 and reopened in 2018, serving east- and south-bound international, domestic and regional trains.

The Söğütlüçeşme railway station, the next station after Haydarpaşa Terminal, is the terminus of the Metrobus line to European side of Istanbul.

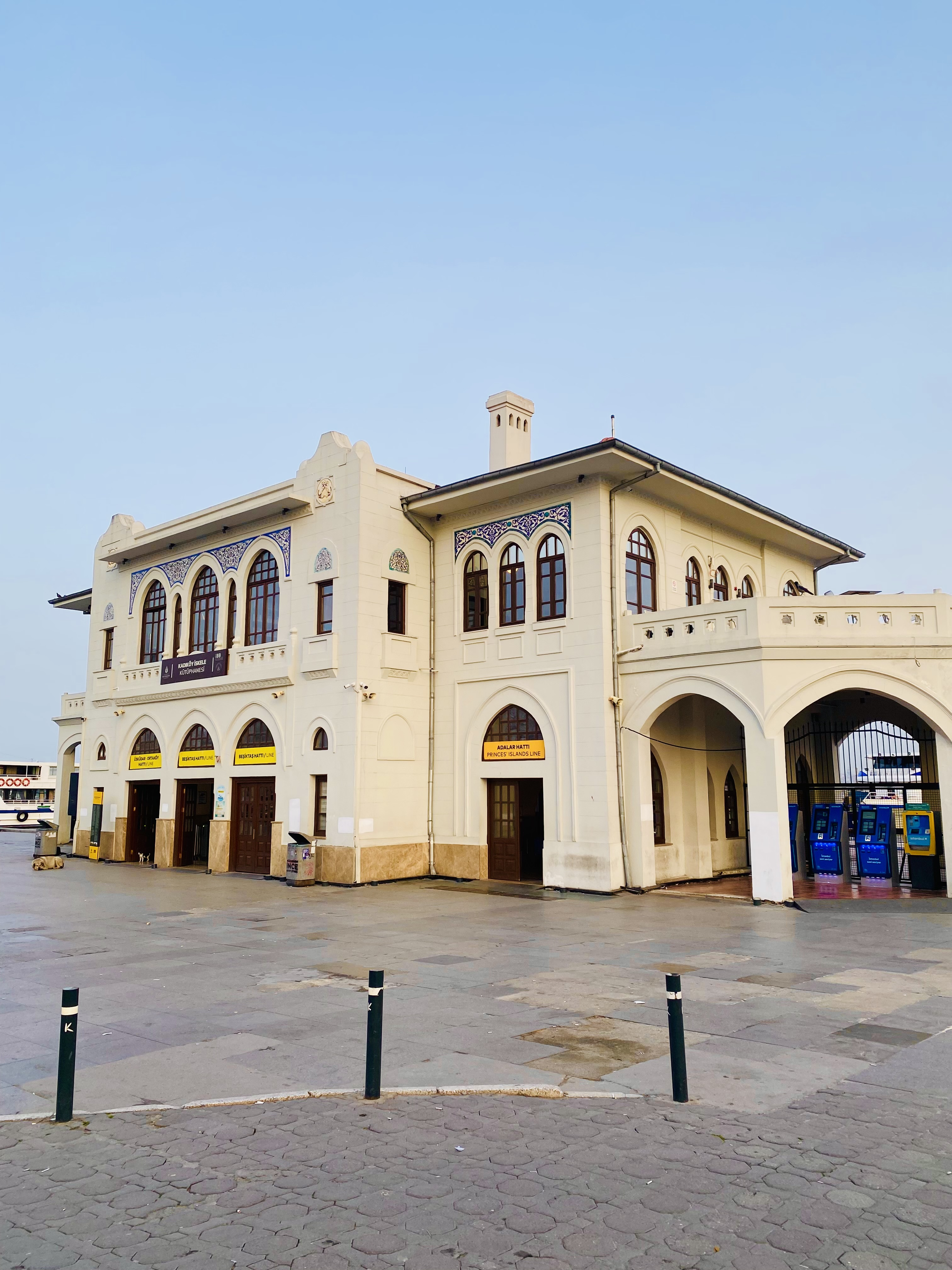
Kadıköy’s Pier Library and ferry terminal.

The M4 line of the Istanbul Metro runs from Kadıköy to Tavşantepe daily between 6:00 and 23:57.

The centre of Kadıköy today is the transportation hub for people commuting between the Asian side of the city and the European side across the Bosphorus. There is a large bus and minibus terminal next to the ferry quay. Ferries are the most dominantly visible form of transport in Kadıköy, and the central market area is adjacent to the ferry quay.

Public transportation with terminus in Kadıköy:

Bus system

- 4 Kadıköy-Bostancı ring (via Bağdat Avenue)
- 8A West Ataşehir
- 10B Bostancı
- 16 Pendik (via Bağdat Avenue)
- 17 Pendik (via so-called minibus way)
- 19F Yeditepe University
- 19M Ataşehir via Ataşehir Boulevard.
- 130A Tuzla
- 222 Pendik (via Bağdat Avenue)
- E-10 Sabiha Gökçen Airport
- ER1 Ring Erenköy (passes through Bağdat Avenue)
- ER2 Ring Erenköy (passes through Bağdat Avenue)
- FB1 Ring Fenerbahçe (passes through west point of Bağdat Avenue)
- FB2 Ring Fenerbahçe (passes through west point of Bağdat Avenue)
- GZ1 Ring Göztepe (passes through Bağdat Avenue)
- GZ2 Ring Göztepe (passes through Bağdat Avenue)

To European side,

- 110 Taksim
- 112 Taksim
- 500A Edirnekapı

For more lines, visit: http://www.iett.istanbul/en/main/hatlar

Metro

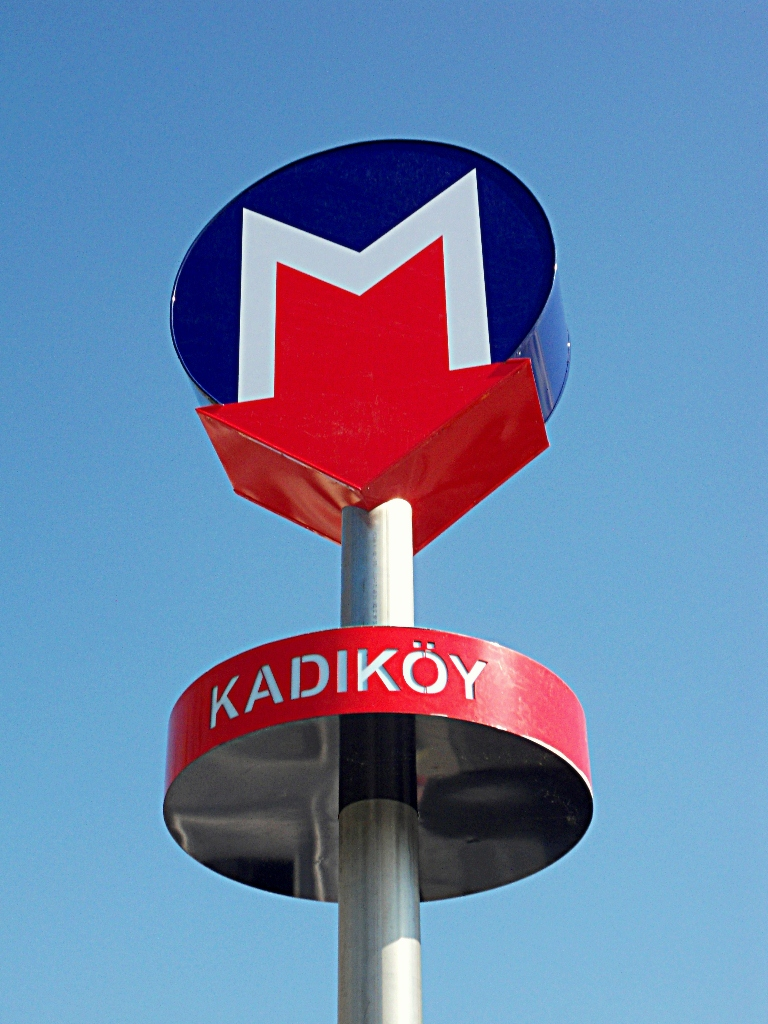
Metro sign at Kadıköy

- M4 Kadıköy-Sabiha Gökçen (Sabiha Gökçen International Airport)
- M8
- Marmaray

Nostalgic tram

- T3 (Ring) Mühürdar-Bahariye-Moda (in centrum)

Ferryboats

Traditional ferries,

- Eminönü
- Karaköy
- Kabataş
- Beşiktaş
- Princes' Islands

Sea buses,

- Bostancı-Kadıköy-Yenikapı-Bakırköy
- Kabataş

== Kadıköy today ==
=== Politics ===
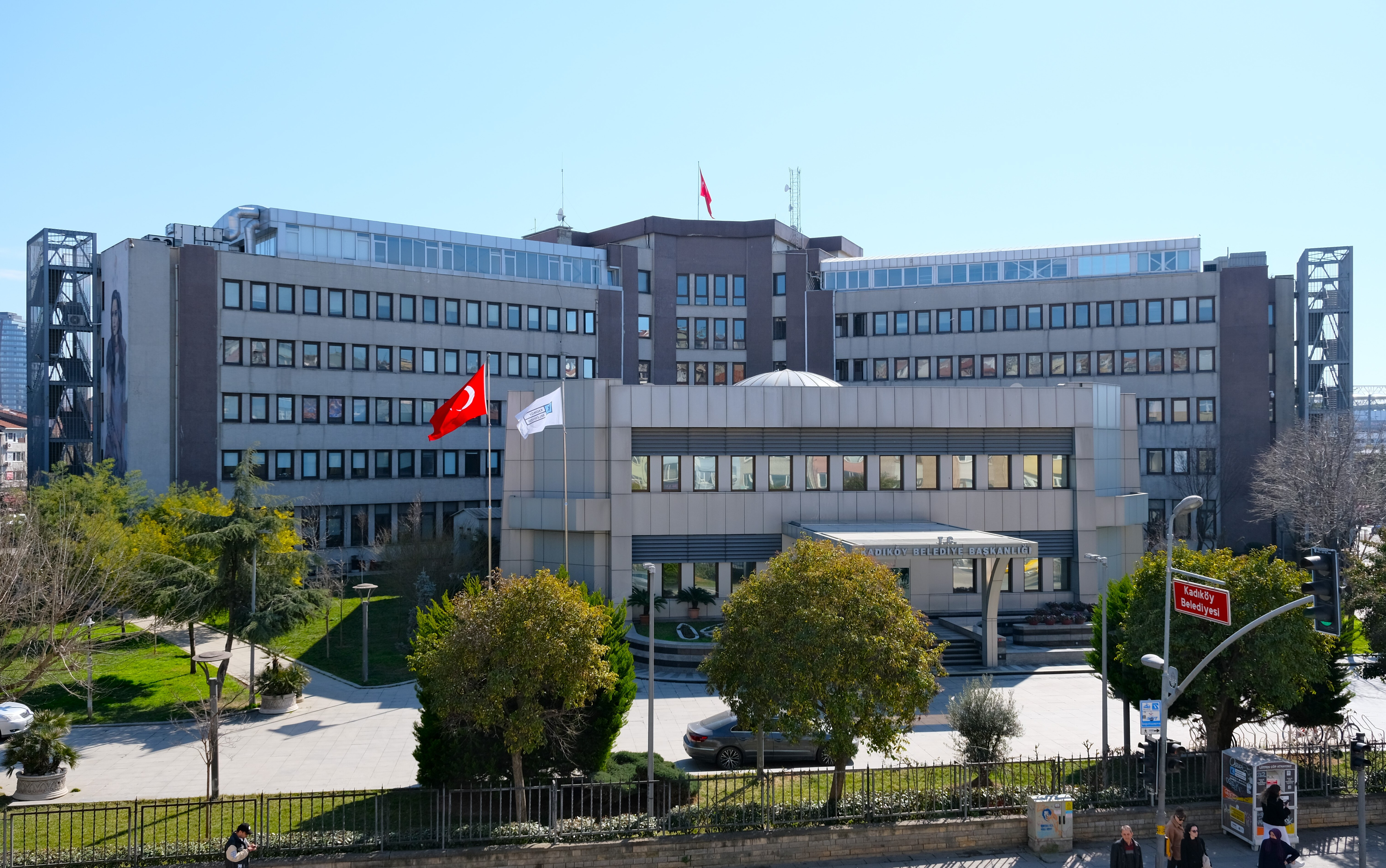
Kadıköy Municipality Building in 2024

For the main opposition party Republican People's Party (CHP), Kadıköy has been a stronghold in both local and national elections. Since 1989, the local electorate have voted for social democratic candidates to be chosen mayors, namely from the CHP as well as the SHP, its 1980s coup-era counterpart. Kadıköy ranks 1st place on the Human Development Index scale, among all the other districts of Turkey, according to a 2020 report and ranks 4th place in socio-economic development.

=== Education ===
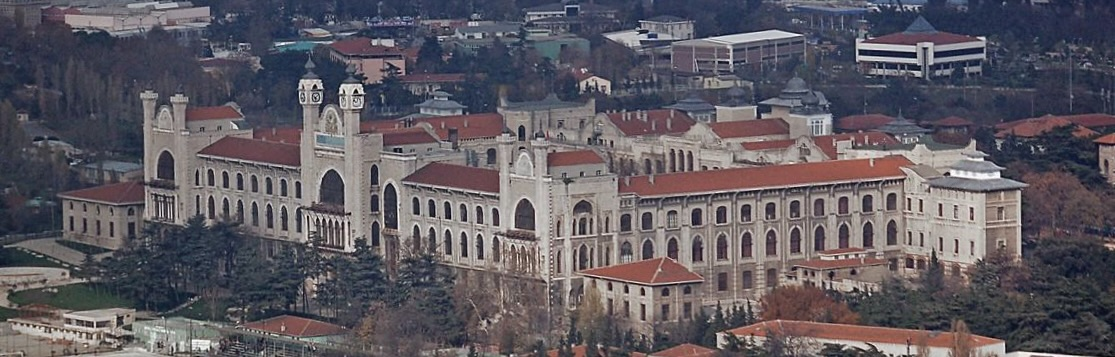
Marmara University's Haydarpaşa Campus in Kadıköy Region

Marmara University has most of its buildings in Kadıköy, including the large and elegant Haydarpaşa Campus, while the largest private university in Istanbul, Yeditepe University, is located on the hill named "Kayışdağı" at the easternmost edge of the borough (Which later connected to Ataşehir). A new state university, İstanbul Medeniyet University, opened in 2010. It has its main building in Göztepe, Merdivenköy, and has begun to develop campuses in both Kadıköy and Üsküdar. The campuses are divided by the D-100 Highway. Each have a metro station close by.

Another private institution for higher education, the Doğuş University, is situated in the Acıbadem neighborhood of Kadıköy.

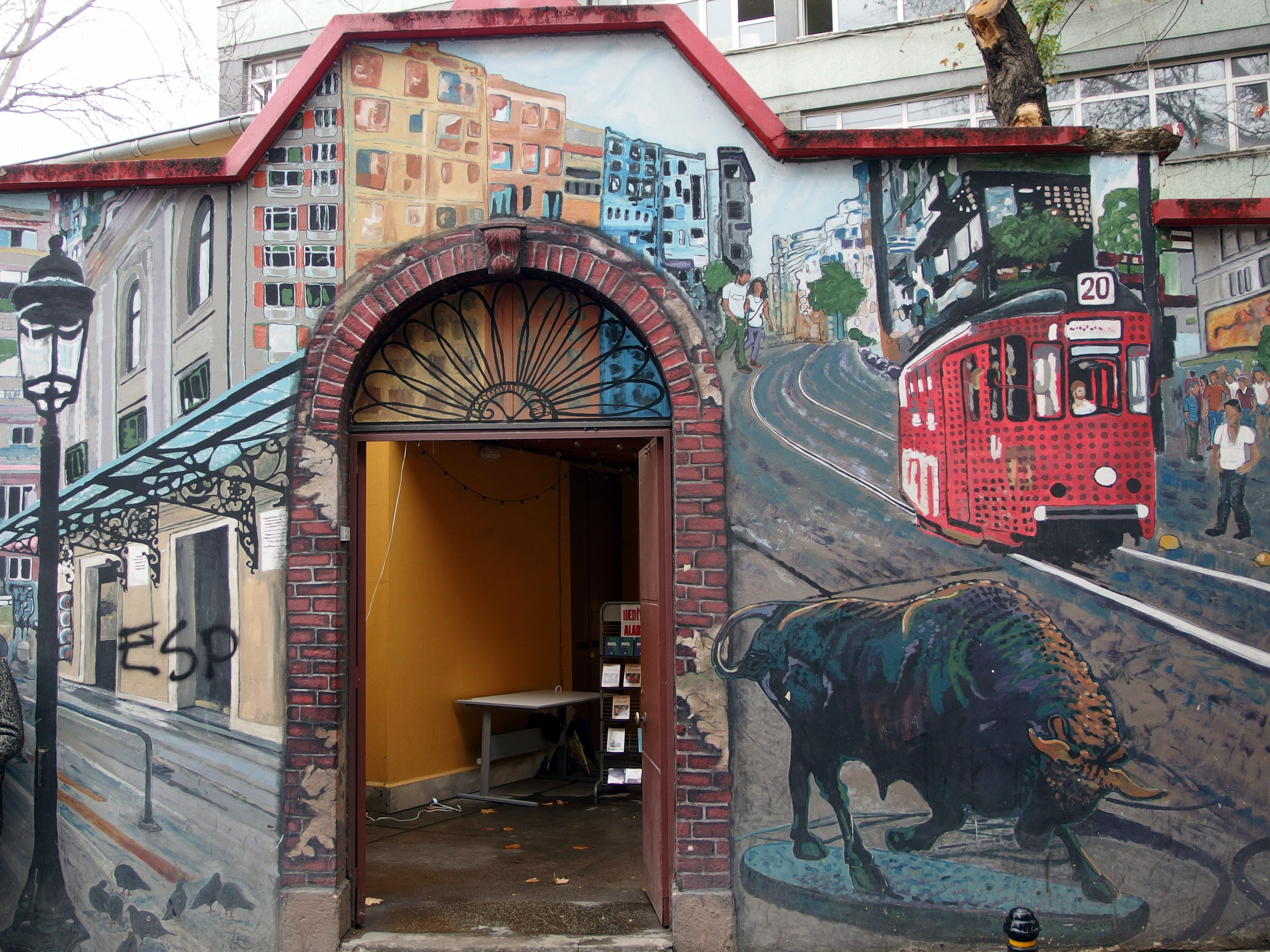
Kadıköy streets are popular with street art.

Remarkable and important high schools in the area include Atatürk Fen Lisesi, Kadıköy Anadolu Lisesi Erenköy Kız Lisesi, and Saint-Joseph French High School.

=== Shopping ===
Kadıköy is a busy shopping district, with a wide variety of atmospheres and architectural styles. The streets are varied, some being narrow alleyways and others, such as Bahariye Caddesi, being pedestrian zones. Turkey's biggest food market is there, starting next to the Osman Ağa Mosque, and has an immense turnover of fresh foods and other products from all around Turkey, including a wide range of fresh fish and seafood, olive oil soap, and so on. There are also modern shopping centres, most notably the large Tepe Nautilus Shopping Mall behind the center of Kadıköy, and pavements crowded with street vendors selling socks, unlicensed copies of popular novels, and other products. In the streets behind the main post office, there is a large number of well-known bookshops selling both new and second-hand books, craft-shops and picture-framers, and a number of shops selling music CDs and related ephemera such as film posters and T-shirts. Hard Rock and Heavy Metal music is sold in the arcade named Akmar Pasajı, where associated items are also sold. On Sundays this area becomes a large second-hand book and music street market. Being a crowded shopping district, Kadıköy has many buskers, shoe shine boys, glue sniffers and schoolchildren in the streets selling flowers, chewing gum and packets of tissues.

At the top of the shopping district there is an intersection, with a statue of a bull, called Altıyol (Six Ways), where a road leads to the civic buildings and a huge street market called Salı Pazarı (Tuesday Market). The working-class residential districts of Hasanpaşa and Fikirtepe are located behind the civic buildings.

=== Housing ===
There is a lot of residential property in the centre of Kadıköy, mostly somewhat dilapidated today, but there are still quiet suburban streets. The area is home to many students as well as a small number of foreign residents.

=== Attractions, entertainment and eating ===
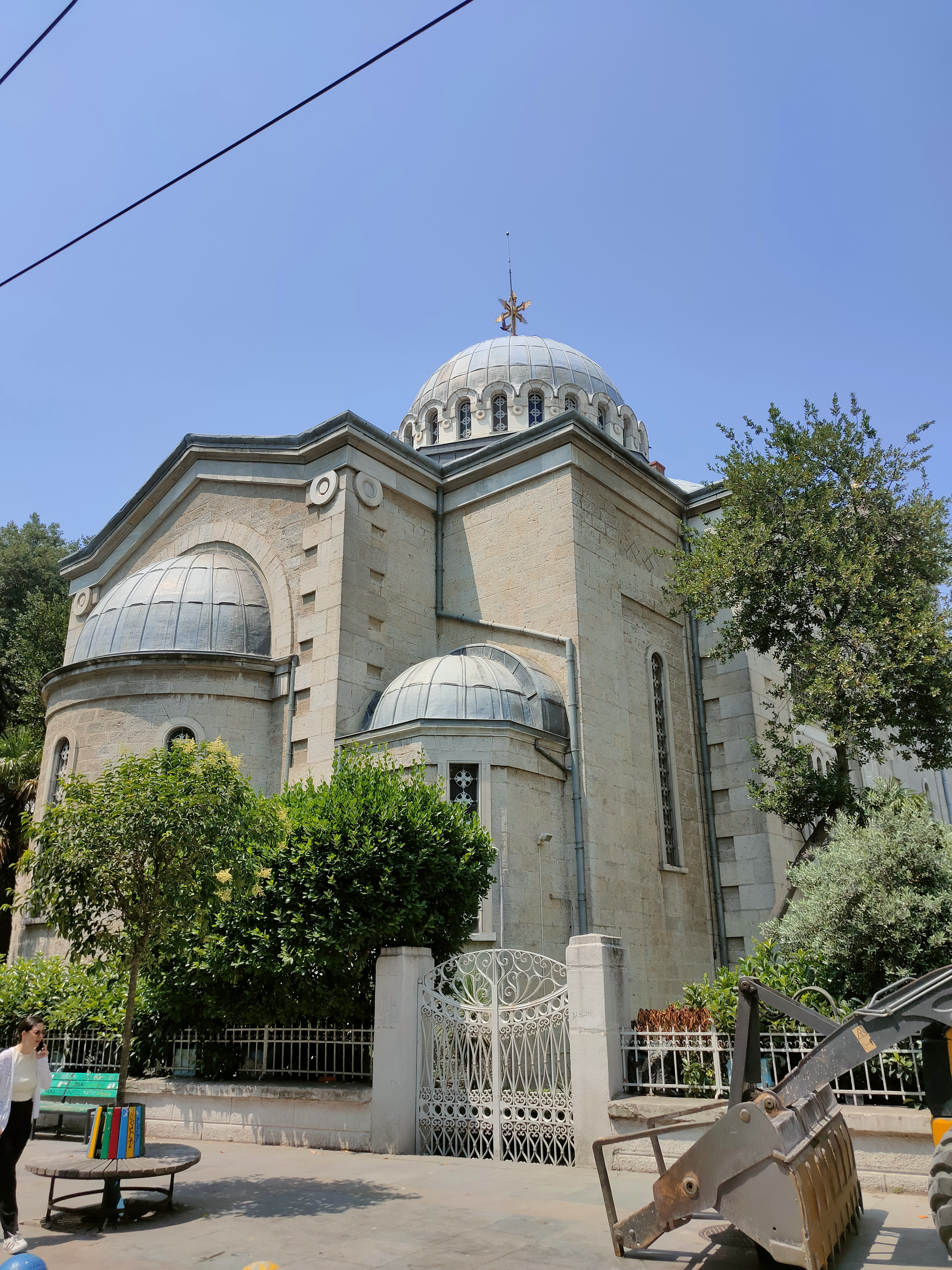
Ayia Triada Greek Orthodox Church in Kadıköy

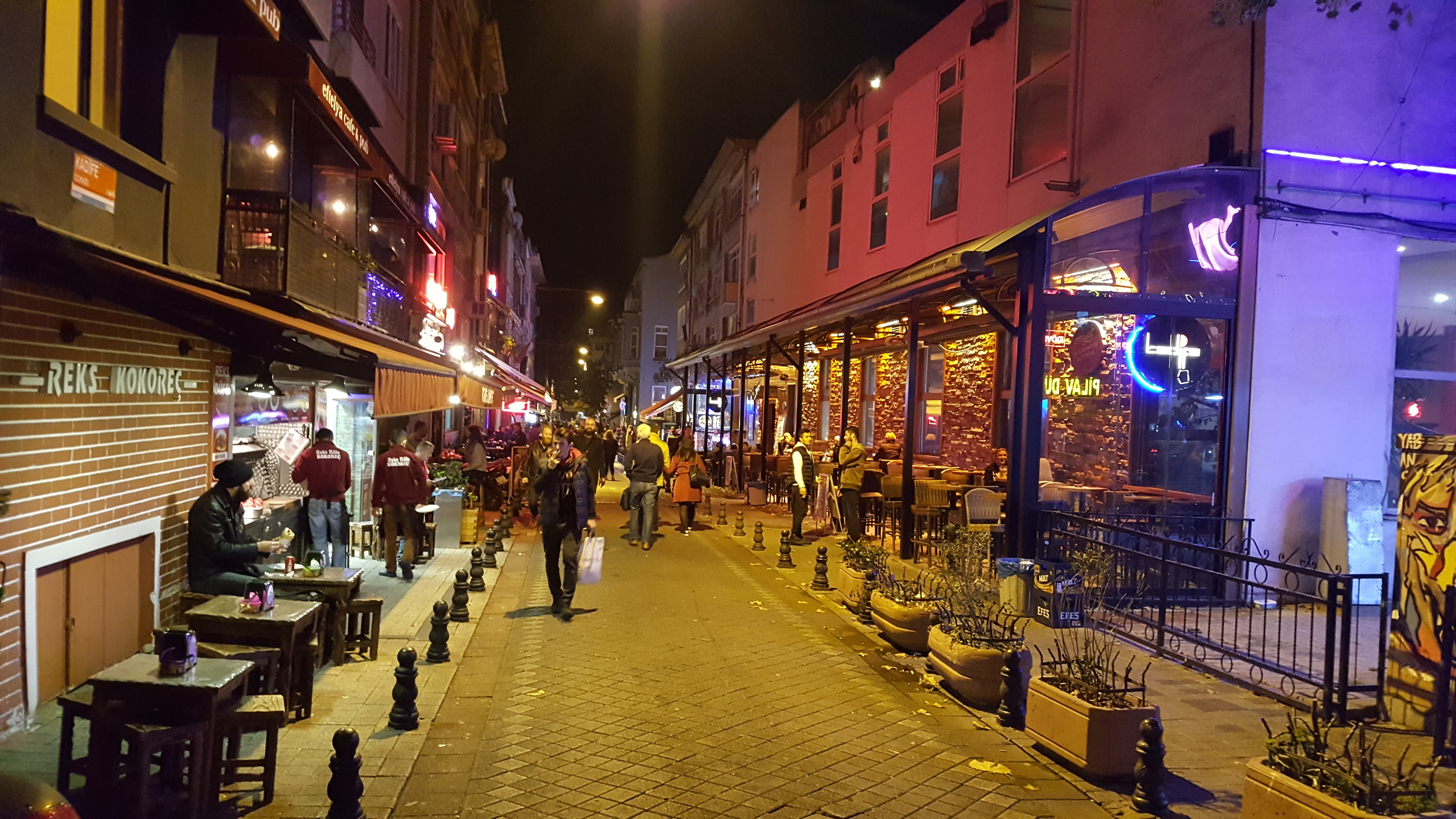
Kadıköy is popular for its nightlife.

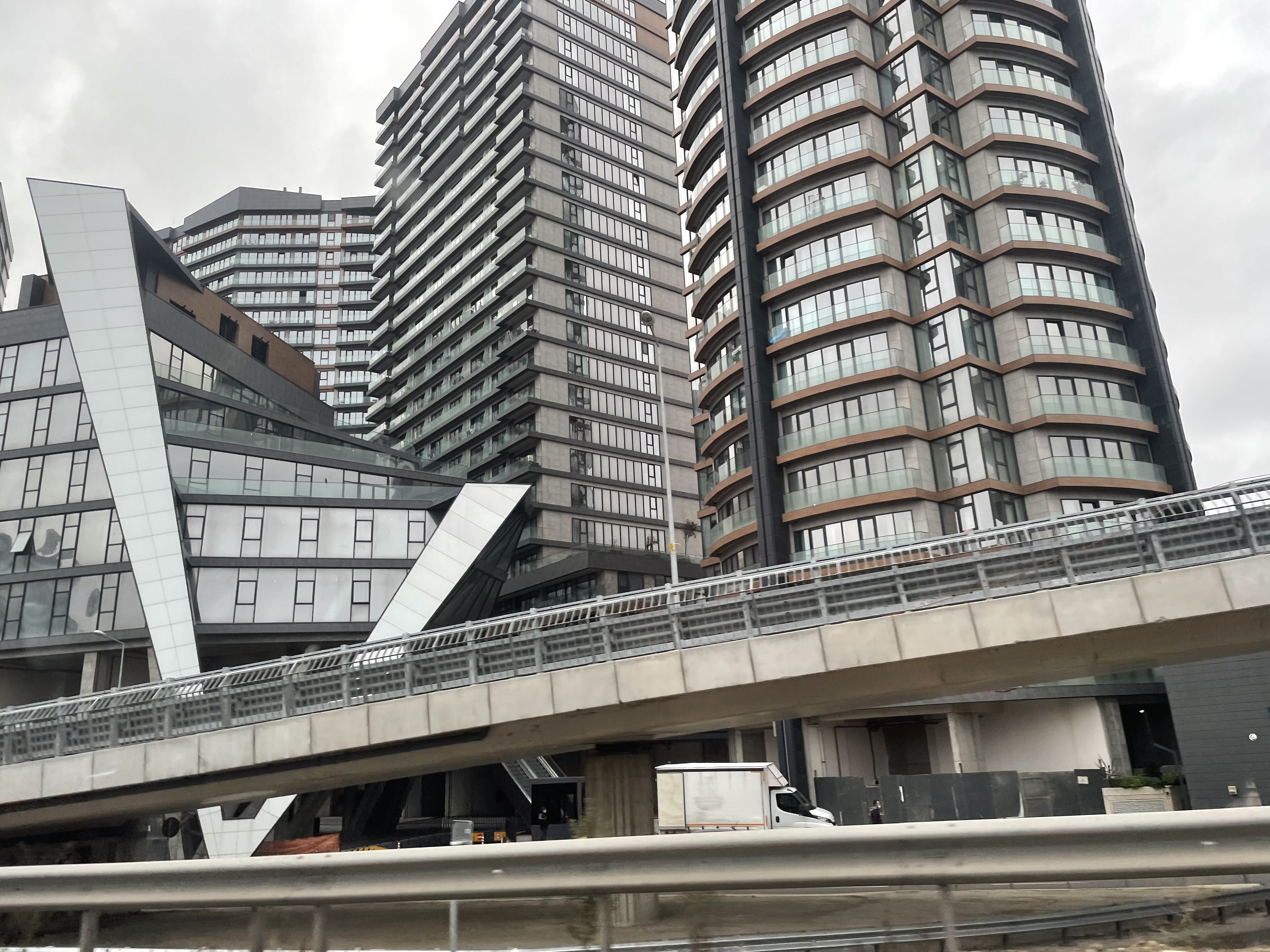
Fikirtepe residential area, within the borders of Kadıköy district, is a major urban redevelopment project.

Kadıköy has many narrow streets filled with cafés, bars and restaurants, as well as many cinemas. Süreyya Opera House is a recent redevelopment of the same named historic movie theatre.

The market area is mostly closed to traffic and contains a wide variety of fast food restaurants serving toasted sandwiches, hamburgers and döner. There are also traditional Turkish restaurants and patisseries, bridge schools, wine houses, bars with jazz, folk and rock music, as well as working class tea and backgammon houses.

Behind the coast, lies a large shopping and residential district winding uphill to the Bahariye Caddesi pedestrian zone. This area was transformed during the economic boom of the 1990s and shops were opened and bars at surrounding.

Kadıköy's entertainment is generally not of the affluent type. It has a more working class ambiance; therefore, it is easier to find food of the like of kebab and fried mussels than haute cuisine, although one of Istanbul's most traditional Turkish cuisine representatives, Yanyalı Fehmi Lokantası and the foreign tourist attracting Çiya is found here. Also, the oldest recorded maker of Turkish delight, Hacı Bekir and chocolate maker Baylan are located in Kadıköy.

Kadıköy does not have as much nightlife as Beyoğlu (where nightlife also continues much later into the night), nor does it have Nişantaşı's style of shopping or the Bosphorus for nightlife. Instead, it is often considered a modest alternative but may still be regarded as vibrant and cosy. Residents like to frequent the seaside to walk or sit in the grass with a view of the European side of Istanbul across the Bosporus.

== Surrounding residential areas ==
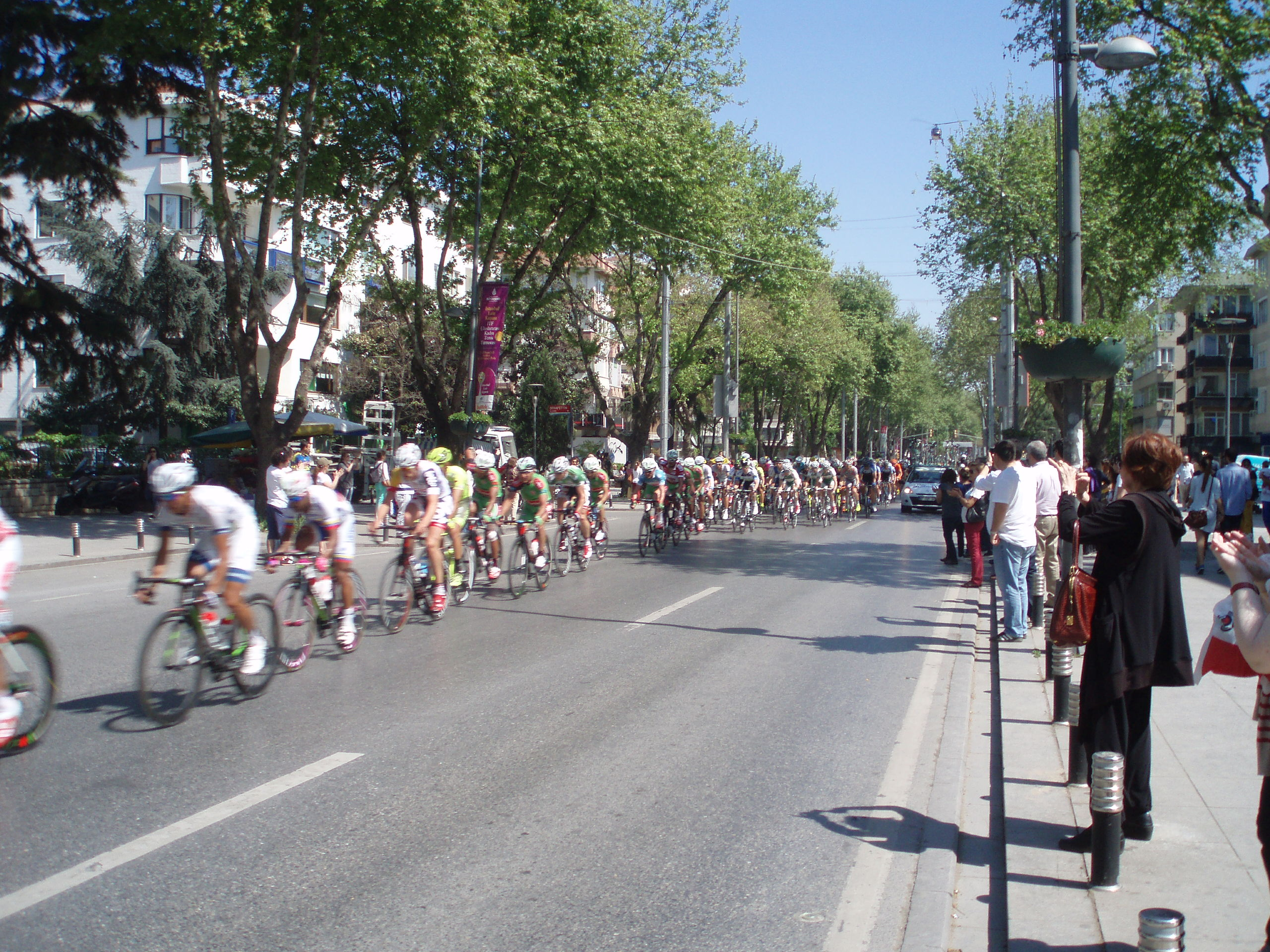
Presidential Cycling Tour of Turkey at Bağdat Avenue

=== Coastal areas ===
Along the coast, away from the centre of Kadıköy, there are many expensive shops and the area becomes more upmarket in neighbourhoods near the Bağdat Avenue. There is also the Moda quarter located south of central Kadıköy.

Moda is an old, quiet, cosmopolitan Istanbul settlement. As elsewhere in Istanbul, many historic houses have been demolished and replaced with apartment buildings; however, Moda is generally considered one of the more pleasant residential districts in the city. There are numerous churches in Moda with active congregations, and well-known schools, such as the Lycée Saint-Joseph and Kadıköy Anadolu Lisesi. There is a small, attractive theatre in Moda named Oyun Atölyesi, founded by actor Haluk Bilginer. The area is also well known for its multiple modern cafes, bars, shops and is popular among Istanbul's creative class and tourists.

Beyond this area, the huge stadium of Fenerbahçe Football Club dominates the skyline. From here, the long shopping street Bağdat Avenue heads east and there are many affluent neighbourhoods between the avenue and the coast. Until the 1950s these areas, such as Göztepe, Caddebostan, Erenköy, and Suadiye, were full of summer houses and mansions for the city's wealthy upper middle class. Since the Bosphorus Bridge was built, it has become easier to commute from here to the European side of Istanbul, and most of these summer houses have been demolished and replaced with modern apartment buildings. The coast here has a long stretch of seaside parks and yacht marinas, and the streets behind the coast in areas such as Caddebostan are lined with numerous bars and cafés. From Bostancı onwards the economic level progressively lessens, so there are more retired and working-class residents here. There are no more villas, excepting some on the coast at Dragos, and the apartment buildings are narrower and less widely spaced. Bostancı itself is a busy shopping district built around a railway station.

=== Inland areas ===
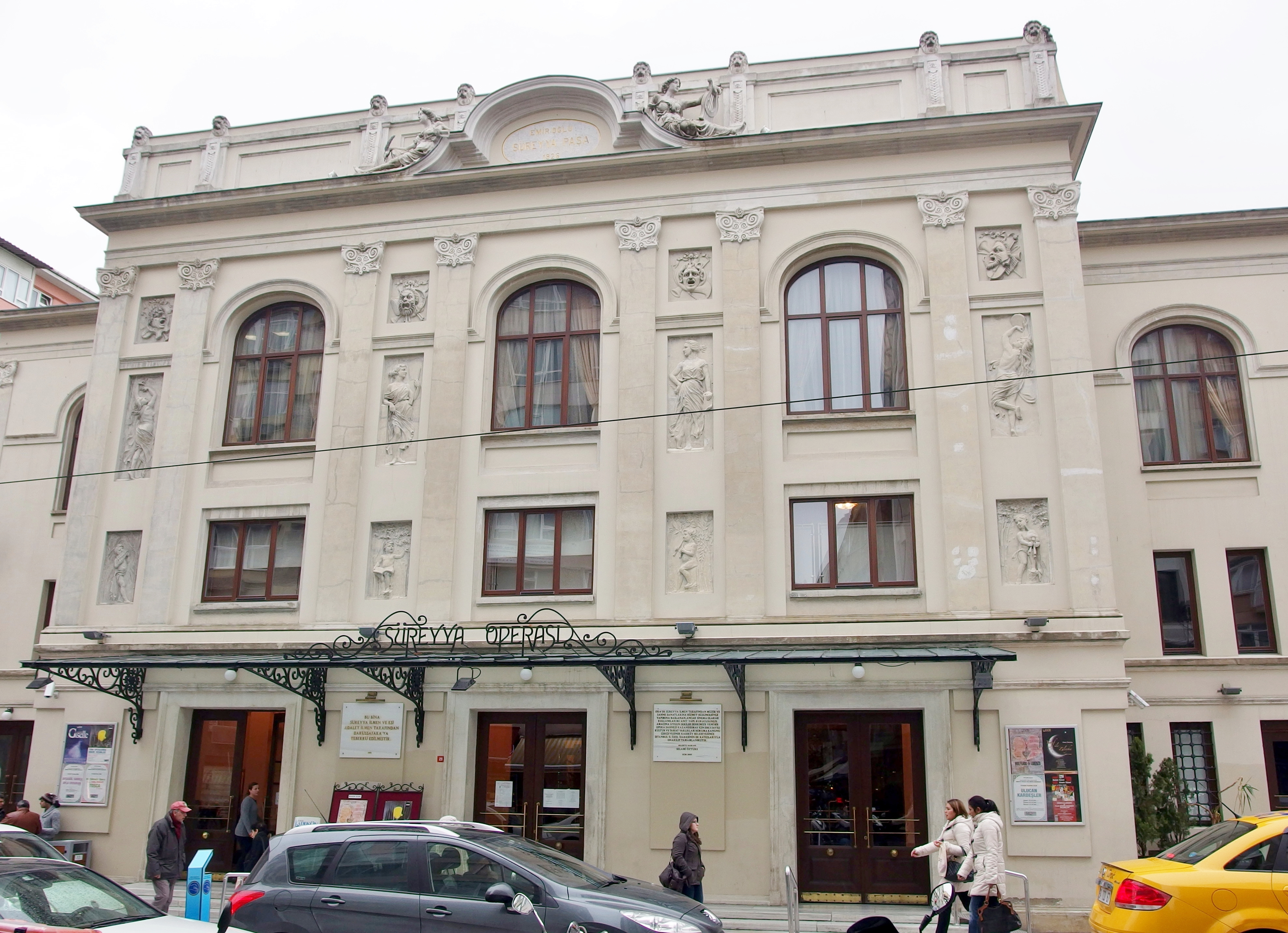
Exterior of the Süreyya Opera House in Bahariye, Kadıköy

Inland from the coast there is a great deal of housing development: Most are expensive, especially in areas such as Kozyatağı. These districts house many of Istanbul's upper-middle class residents. These neighbourhoods are mainly built around wide avenues and tree-lined streets, with four to six-storey apartment buildings that have sizable gardens and car-parking around them. Especially in Kozyatağı, there are old Ottoman houses nearly in every houses' garden. Kozyatağı, Suadiye and Kazasker used to be one of the most popular summer areas for wealthy Istanbul residents. Today, Kozyatağı has tree-lined streets, especially magnolia, linden and fruit trees such as medlar trees, plum trees, cherry, mulberry and quince trees, many large greenfields, parks, children parks. These areas, Suadiye, Bağdat Avenue, Kalamış, Kozyatağı, Fenerbahçe have today, upper-middle or upper class residents. There are many schools, hospitals, shops and restaurants in these areas. Another smart new neighbourhood is Acıbadem. This area has one of the best-known private hospitals in the city and a long avenue of cafés, restaurants and ice cream parlours. In the late 1990s, new luxury housing developments such as Ataşehir began to be constructed in the previously undeveloped area north of the E5 highway. These have their own shops, private colleges, sports centres and other facilities. Ataşehir separated from Kadıköy in 2009 elections.

== Climate ==
Kadıköy experiences a Mediterranean climate (Csa/Cs) according to both Köppen and Trewartha climate classifications, with cool winters and warm to hot summers. Its milder winters allow it to be classified in USDA hardiness zone 9b, while its summers are hot enough to be classified as AHS heat zone 4.

Climate data for Göztepe, Istanbul
Month	Jan	Feb	Mar	Apr	May	Jun	Jul	Aug	Sep	Oct	Nov	Dec	Year
Mean daily maximum °C (°F)	8.7 (47.7)	9.3 (48.7)	11.5 (52.7)	16.7 (62.1)	21.4 (70.5)	26.1 (79.0)	28.2 (82.8)	28.1 (82.6)	25.0 (77.0)	19.8 (67.6)	15.4 (59.7)	11.2 (52.2)	18.5 (65.2)
Daily mean °C (°F)	5.6 (42.1)	5.8 (42.4)	7.5 (45.5)	11.9 (53.4)	16.5 (61.7)	21.1 (70.0)	23.2 (73.8)	22.9 (73.2)	19.7 (67.5)	15.3 (59.5)	11.6 (52.9)	8.1 (46.6)	14.1 (57.4)
Mean daily minimum °C (°F)	2.9 (37.2)	3.1 (37.6)	4.2 (39.6)	8.0 (46.4)	12.0 (53.6)	16.1 (61.0)	18.4 (65.1)	18.4 (65.1)	15.5 (59.9)	11.9 (53.4)	8.4 (47.1)	5.4 (41.7)	10.4 (50.6)
Average precipitation mm (inches)	87.9 (3.46)	70.2 (2.76)	62.5 (2.46)	43.2 (1.70)	30.2 (1.19)	27.0 (1.06)	23.9 (0.94)	29.7 (1.17)	46.7 (1.84)	69.2 (2.72)	90.5 (3.56)	111.5 (4.39)	692.5 (27.25)

== Architecture ==
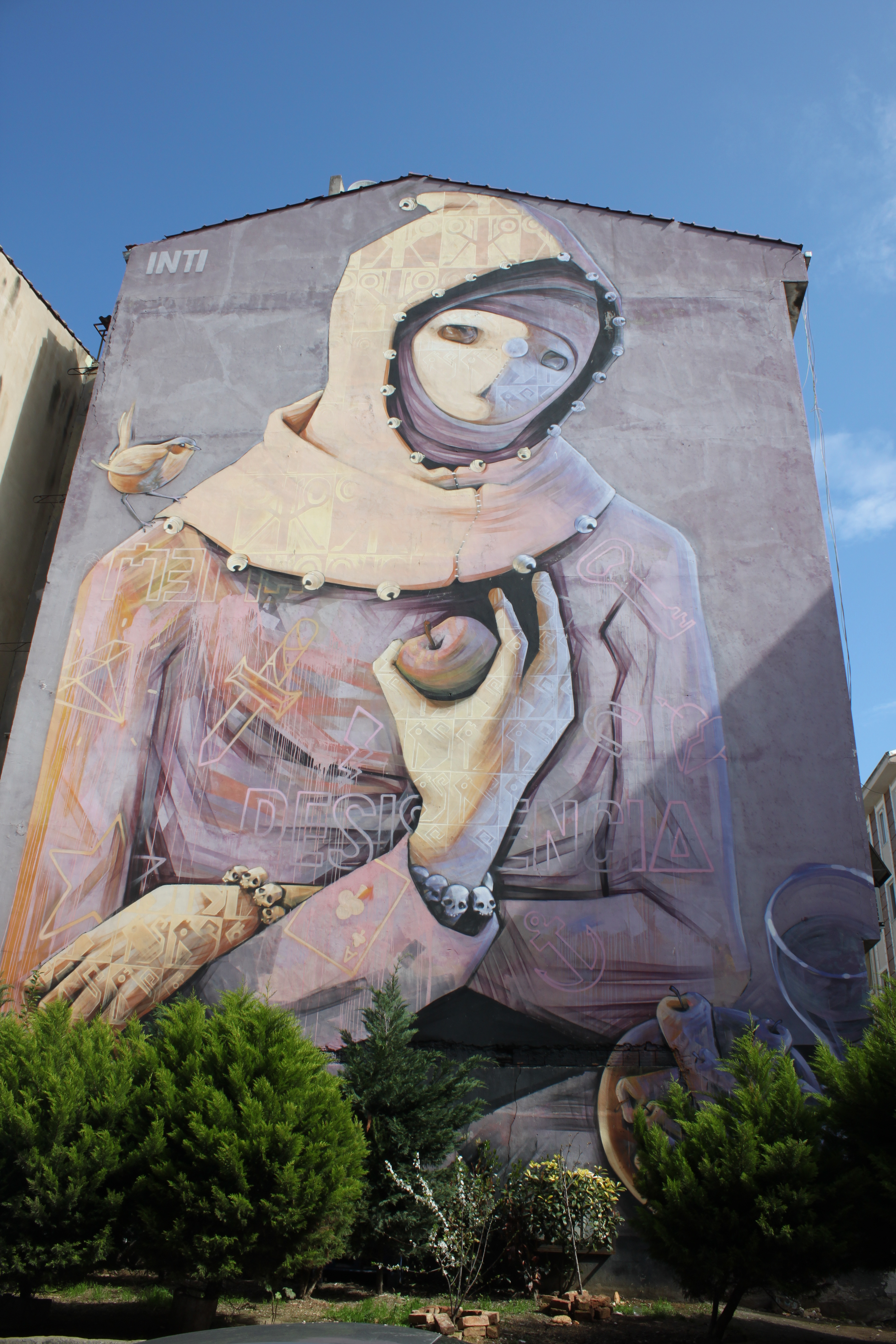
Yeldeğirmeni neighbourhood is famous for its murals.

Kadıköy has many houses from the Ottoman and some from Roman period which are hidden in its side streets. Some of them have been turned into cafés, pubs and restaurants, particularly serving seafood and rest of them waiting for restoration. Yeldeğirmeni is an important neighbourhood in terms of architecture.

== Sport ==
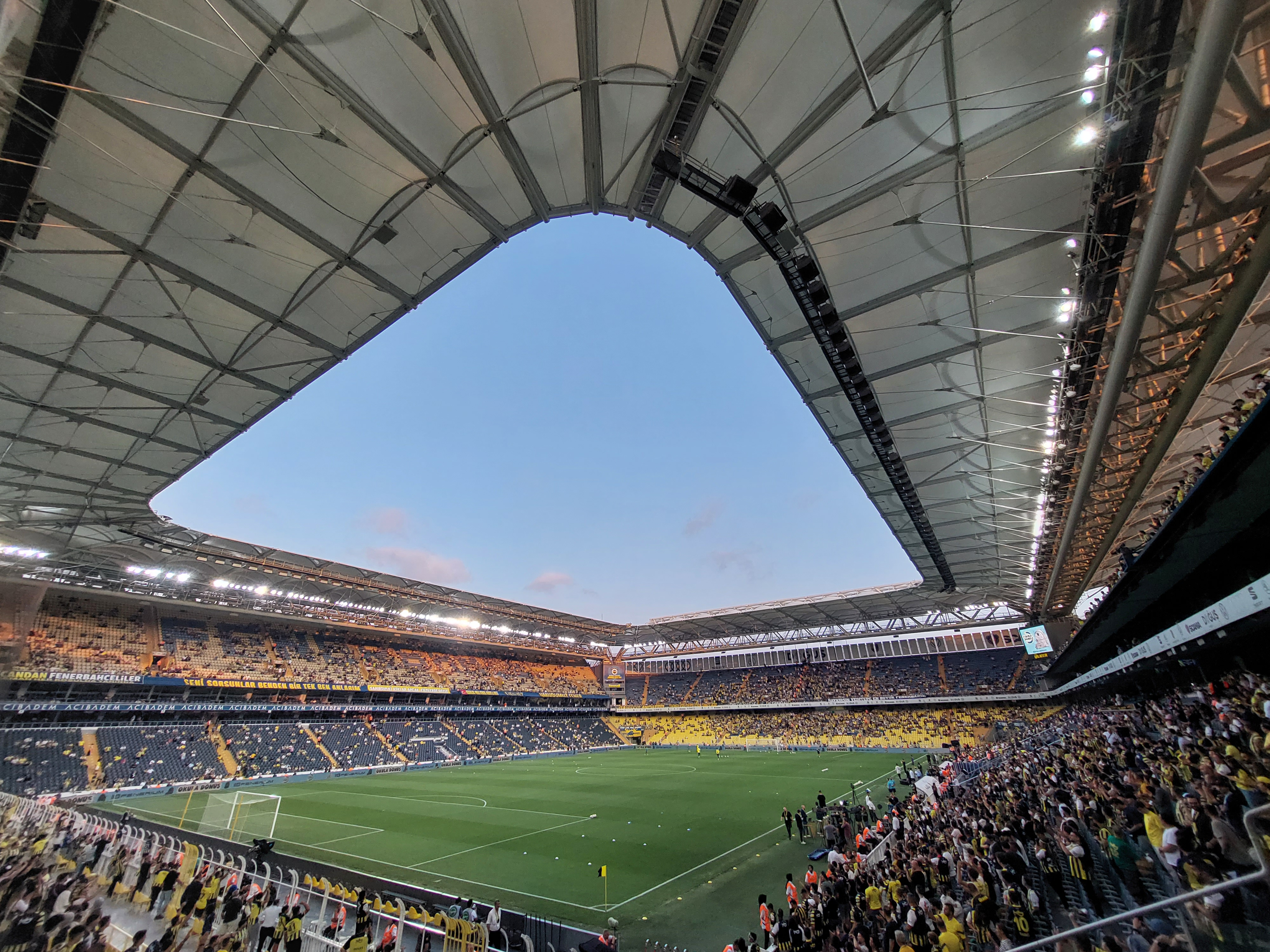
Şükrü Saracoğlu Stadium, where Turkish powerhouse Fenerbahçe has played its matches since its establishment (1907) and is the first modern stadium in Turkey

The district is home to the major Turkish powerhouse, multi-sport club Fenerbahçe S.K. and their football stadium, the Şükrü Saracoğlu Stadium. It is the neighborhood where Fenerbahçe was founded. Kadıköy is also the area where the first football match in the Ottoman Empire was played. Following important victories, all neighbourhoods of Kadıköy are crowded with celebrating people. The stadium hosted the 2009 UEFA Cup Final. The area also has a rugby union team, Kadıköy Rugby, which was the first official rugby club in Turkey.

The multi-purpose arena of Caferağa Sport Hall, located in the center of Kadıköy's shopping district, is home to the basketball teams of Alpella (men team) and Fenerbahçe Istanbul (women team), volleyball teams (Fenerbahçe Men's Volleyball and Fenerbahçe Women's Volleyball).

The district was also home to KadıköySpor, a basketball club that evolved into the current top-level club Anadolu Efes.

== Religion ==
Kadıköy has been always a place with population belonging to the three Abrahamic religions: Judaism, Christianity, and Islam. There are still many examples of mosques, Greek and Armenian Orthodox churches, and Ottoman–Jewish synagogues, as with the rest of Istanbul.

The town serves as the Holy See for the Metropolis of Chalcedon, one of the four remaining metropolises of the Ecumenical Patriarchate of Constantinople in Turkey today. Hemdat Israel Synagogue, situated in Yeldeğirmeni neighbourhood close to Haydarpaşa Terminal, is one of the oldest Jewish houses of prayer in Istanbul.

There are a high number of non-believers in Kadıköy, especially among the youth, as the Atheism Association, the only atheism-related institution in Turkey is located here.

== Twin towns – sister cities ==
Kadıköy is twinned with:

- Friedrichshain-Kreuzberg (Berlin), Germany
- Petah Tikva, Israel

== See also ==
- Hasanpaşa Gasworks, 1892 built gasworks, today a museum
- History of Istanbul
