= Acıbadem, Üsküdar =

Acıbadem
- Neighbourhood
- Location in Turkey Acıbadem (Istanbul)
- Coordinates: 41.0073°N 29.0533°E
- Country: Turkey
- Province: Istanbul
- District: Üsküdar
- Population (2022): 24,053
- Time zone: UTC+3 (TRT)
- Area code: 0216

Acıbadem is a neighbourhood in the municipality and district of Üsküdar, Istanbul Province, Turkey. Its population is 24,053 (2022). Acıbadem is bordered on the east by Ünalan, on the west by Altunizade, on the north by Küçükçamlıca, and on the south by Hasanpaşa (a neighbourhood of Kadıköy district).
