= Hasanpaşa, Kadıköy =

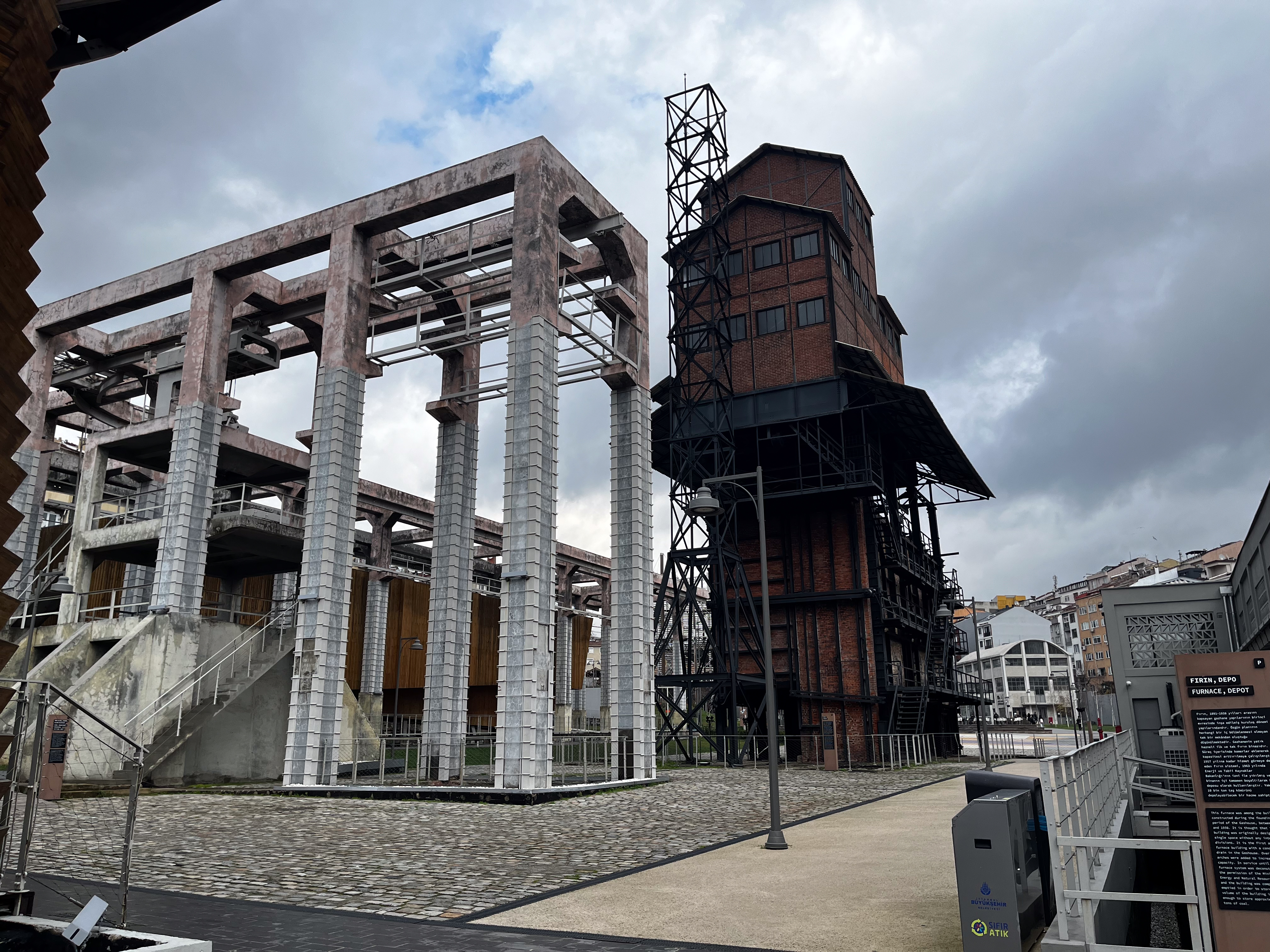
Hasanpaşa Gasworks, Kadıköy, Istanbul

Hasanpaşa is a mahalle in the district of Kadıköy on the Anatolian side of Istanbul, Turkey. The neighborhood's population is 16,310 (2020). The neighborhood is bordered on the north by the Üsküdar neighborhood of Acıbadem, on the southeast by the Kadıköy neighborhoods of Dumlupınar, Fikirtepe, Eğitim, and Zühtüpaşa, on the southwest by the Kadıköy neighborhoods of Osmanağa and Rasimpaşa, and on the northwest by the Kadıköy neighborhood of Acıbadem.

The area is located at a transportation junction, with the D.100 highway and the M4 metro line to its north, and the Marmaray rail line alongside the metrobus line to its south. The neighborhood is home to the Kadıköy Municipality Building and the historical Hasanpaşa Gasworks, an important example of industrial-cultural heritage.

== Notable features ==
- the Kuşdili or Kurbağalı Stream along the southeast boundary of the neighborhood
- the Kadıköy Municipality Building, built 1985-1992
- the Museum Gasworks (Müze Gazhane), formerly the Hasanpaşa Gasworks, built in 1891 to produce coal gas, closed in 1993, restored as a museum in 2021

Following its closure, the gasworks was adaptively reused as a public space, with its industrial-heritage character retained while the site was given new functions.

== History ==
The current neighborhood of Hasanpaşa is within the limits of ancient Chalcedon, with the city's cemetery and hippodrome probably located in this area. During Byzantine times, the area was known for its vineyards, orchards, and vegetable gardens and for its imperial summer palaces.

During the 17th century, in Ottoman times, the area was the property of Kızlarağası Mısırlı Osman Ağa, but was nationalized by Murat IV in 1630. In 1800, it became the property of Selim III, was used as a hunting ground in the time of Mahmut II, and was given to Kapıcıbaşı Hüsameddin Efendi in the time of Abdülmecit I (r. 1839-1861). Hüsameddin Efendi's heirs divided the land into lots and began selling it. The area, however, remained sparsely settled, covered mostly in vineyards, gardens, and meadows. In 1876, some Romanian and Bulgarian refugees from the Russian-Ottoman War were settled in the İkbaliye area of current Hasanpaşa, but even then only 8-10 houses.

A large gasworks began operation in the area in 1892. After the construction of the Hasan Paşa Mosque, more Turks began to settle in the area, and in 1900 the neighborhood was officially separated from the Osman Ağa neighborhood and called the Kaptan Hasan Paşa neighborhood. Because of the gasworks, the neighborhood was also sometimes called Gazhane. By the 1950s, sewage from the crowded neighborhood and discharge from the gasworks had severely polluted Kurbağalı Stream.

== Historic sites ==
- the Osman Ağa Fountain (çeşme), built by Babüssade Ağası Osman Ağa in 1796-97, restored in 2007
- the grave and burial ground of Mahmut Baba, established during the time of Abdülmecid I (r. 1839-1861)
- the ruins of the Söğütlüçeşme Hamam, built in 1875 by Abdi Bey, apparently the father-in-law of Mısır Kadısı Münib Efendi; partly demolished in 1985, now located along a train line
- the Hasan Paşa or Kaptan Paşa Mosque, built in 1899 by Ottoman Minister of the Navy Hasan Hüsnü Paşa of Bozcaada; restored in 2023
