= Merdivenköy, Kadıköy =

Neighbourhood in Istanbul, Turkey

Merdivenköy is a neighborhood (mahalle) in the Kadıköy district, Istanbul. Its northern border is the D.100 highway, with the Üsküdar and Ataşehir districts on the other side. It borders the Kadıköy neighborhoods of Sahrayıcedit on the east and at the southeast corner, Erenköy and Göztepe on the south, Feneryolu at the southwest corner, and Eğitim and Dumlupınar on the west. Its population is 30,620 (2024).

== Historic sites ==
- the Şahkulu Sultan Sufi Lodge, said to have been founded by Orhan Gazi after 1329
- the grave of Gözcü Baba
- the graves of Gül Baba and Mah Baba
- the Merdivenköy Mihrimah Sultan Mosque, built in the 16th century by a daughter of Süleyman
- the summer house of Fahrettin Kerim Gökay
