= Acıbadem, Kadıköy =

Acıbadem
- Neighbourhood
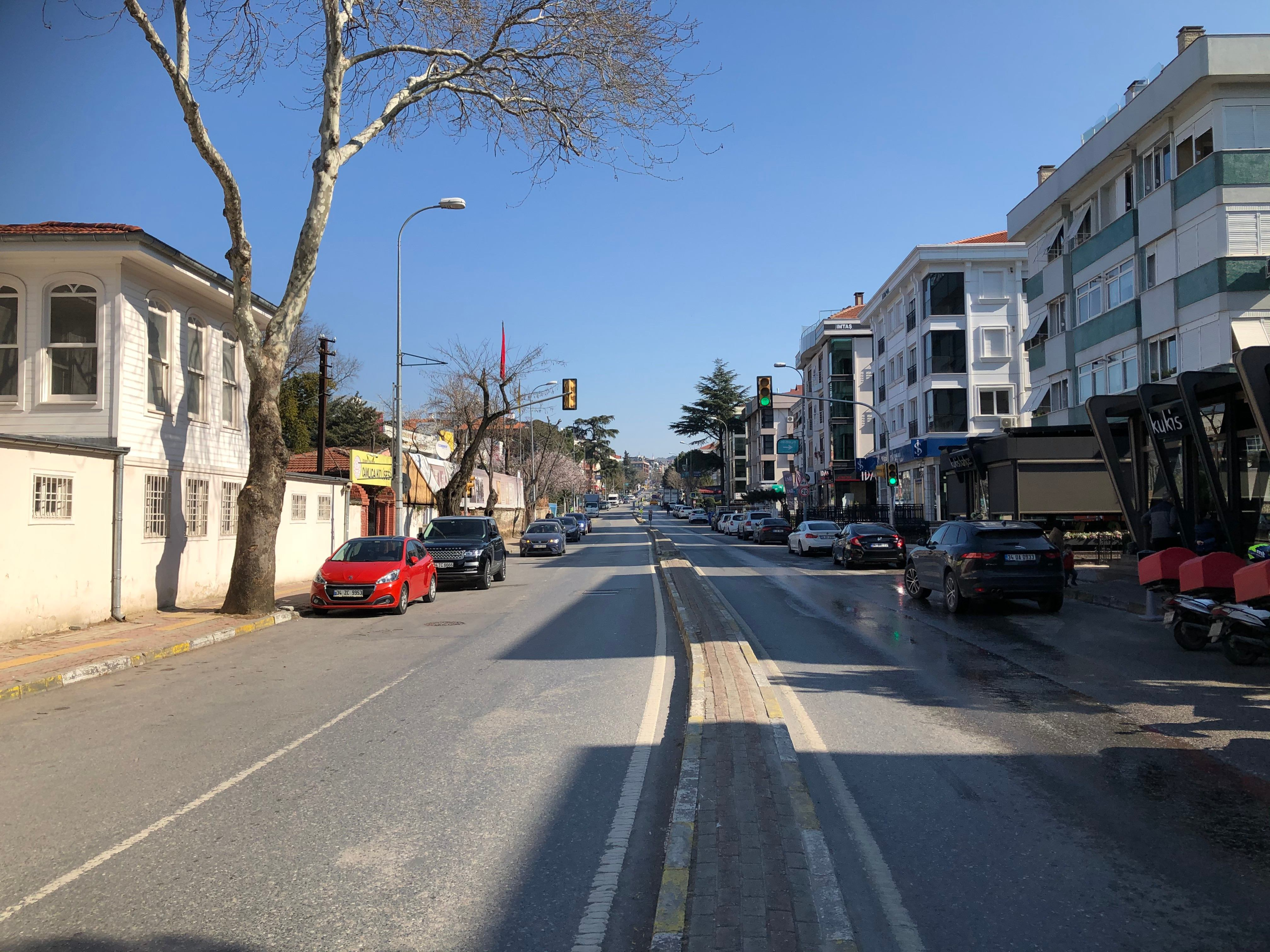

- Location within Turkey Location within Istanbul
- Coordinates: 41.0018°N 29.0299°E
- Country: Turkey
- Province: Istanbul
- District: Kadıköy
- Population (2022): 29,563
- Time zone: UTC+3 (TRT)

Acıbadem is a neighbourhood in the municipality and district of Kadıköy, Istanbul Province, Turkey. Its population is 29,563 (2022). It is on the Anatolian side of Istanbul.

== Economy ==
=== Shopping malls ===
- Akasya

== Transport ==
Metro

- M4 Kadıköy – Sabiha Gökçen Airport
