= Beylikdüzü =

- District and municipality
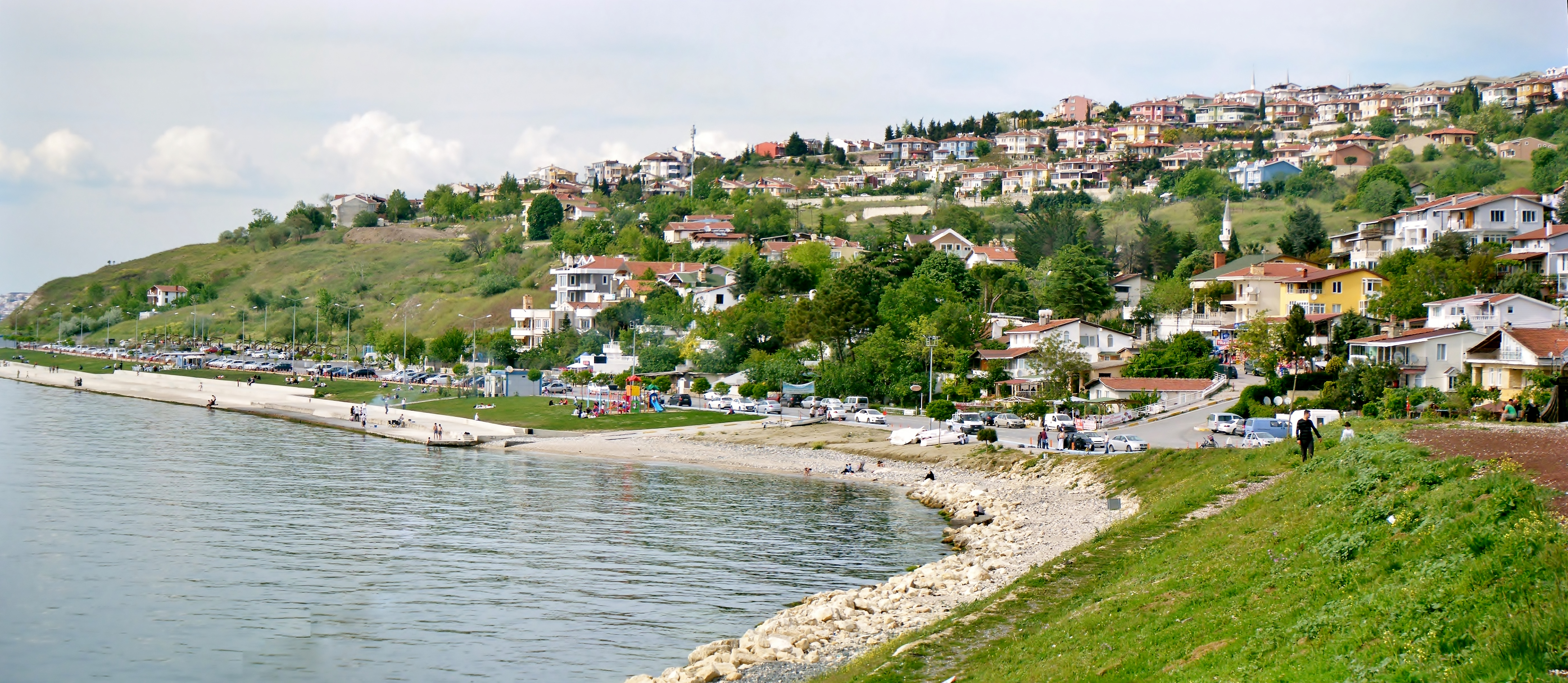
- Beylikdüzü Gürpınar coast

- Logo

- Map showing Beylikdüzü District in Istanbul Province

- Location within Turkey Location within Istanbul
- Coordinates: 41°00′04″N 28°38′31″E
- Country: Turkey
- Province: Istanbul

Government
  - Mayor: Önder Serkan Çebi (acting) (CHP)
- Area: 39 km^{2} (15 sq mi)
- Population (2022): 415,290
  - Density: 11,000/km^{2} (28,000/sq mi)
- Time zone: UTC+3 (TRT)
- Area code: 0212
- Website: www.beylikduzu.bel.tr

Beylikdüzü (Turkish: [bejˈlicdyzy]) is a municipality and district of Istanbul Province, Turkey. Its area is 39 km^{2}, and its population is 415,290 (2024). It is on the European side of Istanbul, located north of the Sea of Marmara, south of Esenyurt, east of Büyükçekmece, and west of Avcılar.

== History ==
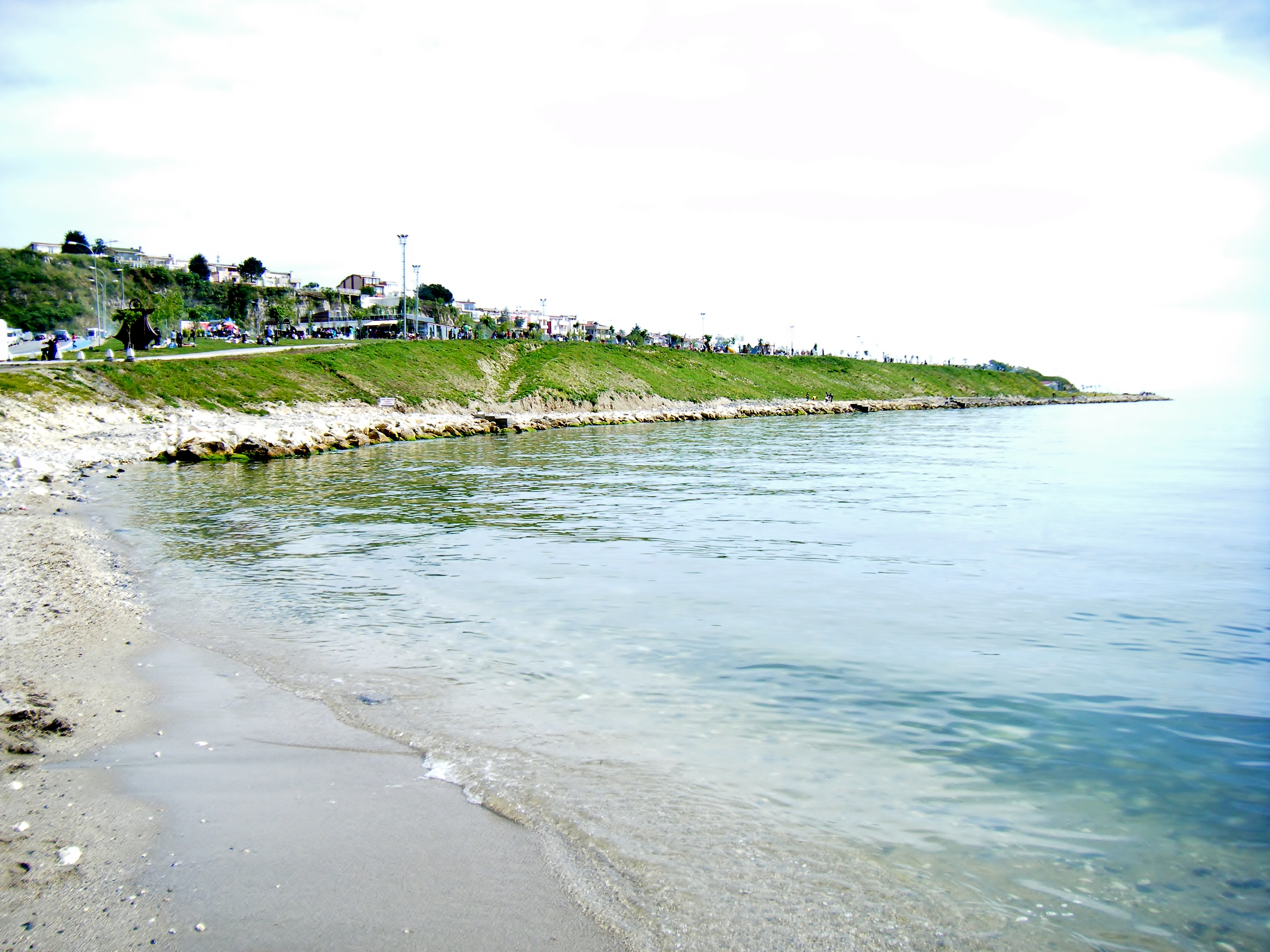
Beylikdüzü Seashore.

It is assumed that Beylikdüzü was first settled by Greeks from Byzantion in the second century AD as a farming village. It later became a popular resort for residents of Constantinople in the Byzantine Empire, a status that continued after the Fall of Constantinople to the Ottoman Empire. The region was referred to as "Garden" in the later Ottoman period, and following the foundation of the Turkish Republic was called "Kavaklı," after the large number of poplar trees, a name which was used until 2003. The modern name means "Plains of the Beylik." In 2008 the district Beylikdüzü was created from part of the district Büyükçekmece.

=== Recent History ===
Beylikdüzü was populated after the 1999 İzmit earthquake by people from older districts of Istanbul who preferred the newly constructed buildings in Beylikdüzü due to safety concerns of the older ones. When the Metrobüs (rapid bus system) was extended from Avcılar to Beylikdüzü in 2012, Beylikdüzü was affected by a second wave of migration. With the advance of Metrobüs the perception of "distance" has changed and places which seemed far away before became closer, so many moved to Beylikdüzü. Its population has grown from around 3000 in the early 1990s to 350,000 by 2018. Since the population of Beylikdüzü consists mostly of migrants from other districts of Istanbul or Turkey, and Beylikdüzü is a relatively recently established city, Beylikdüzü has gained a welcoming atmosphere for the newcomers without having any social stratification. The popularity of Beylikdüzü has increased greatly in the last few years and the region became a hot spot for residential and commercial investments. Beylikdüzü has the highest rapid increase in land and property values in Turkey, making its investors wealthier in a very short time. Beylikdüzü was one of the few municipalities in Turkey that switched from AKP to CHP in 2014, with an overwhelming (>10%) vote.

== General ==
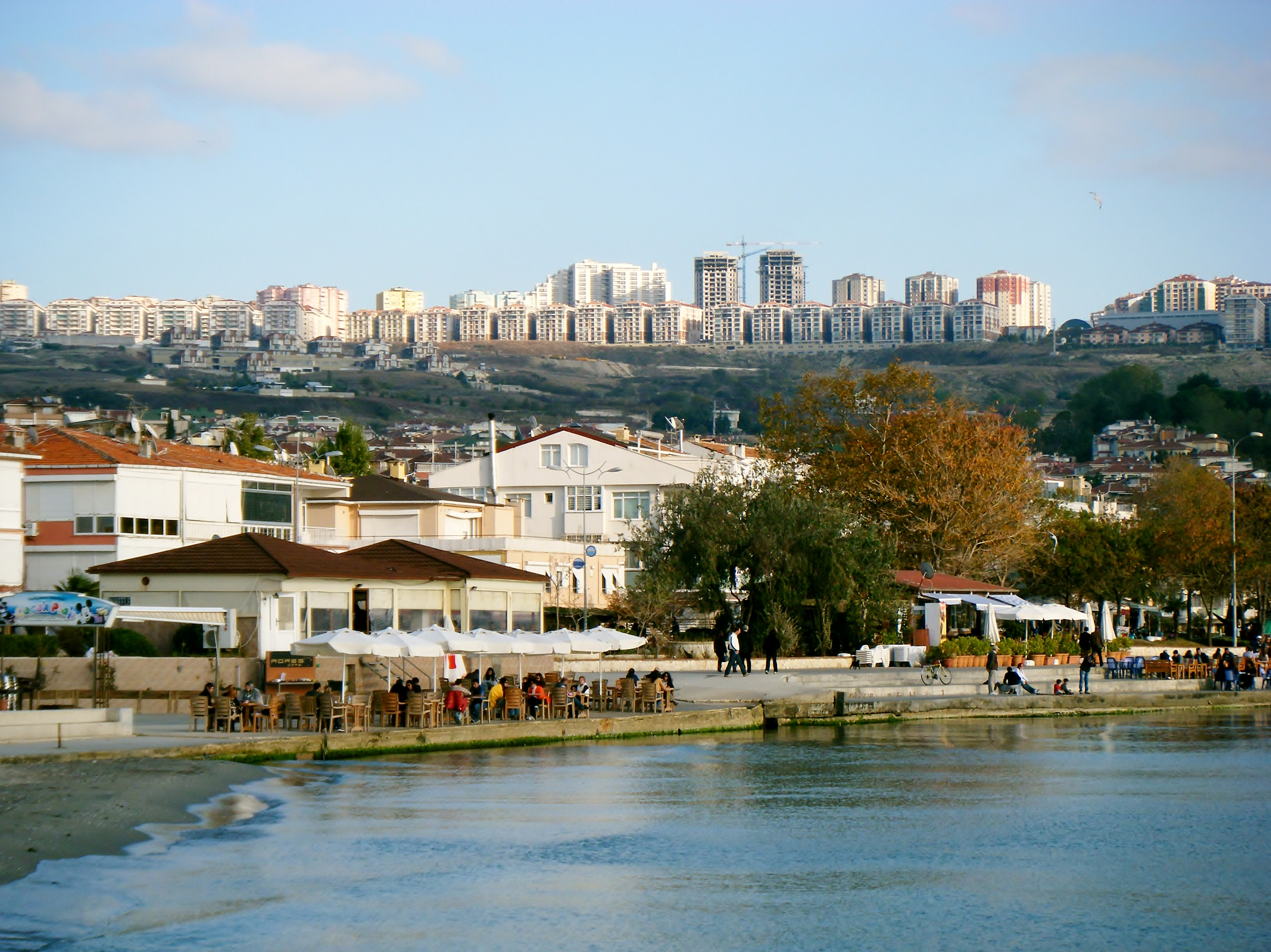
Skyline of the Beylikduzu Beykent area from the seaside.

Beylikdüzü is the modern part of Istanbul. Beylikdüzü together with the Ataköy Marina district are now attracting the upper-middle class because of their good infrastructure, and are seeing the construction of new luxury developments. The attraction is also increased by their close proximity to the Istanbul Atatürk Airport. Beylikdüzü is home to the most shopping malls in Istanbul and is considered a heaven for shopping, also referred to as the "AVM cumhuriyeti" (or republic of shopping in English).

Beylikdüzü is one of the most cosmopolitan districts of Istanbul, thus hosting a mosaic of different cultures of Turkey together with people from other countries. Beylikdüzü matches the European cities with its high green space per person. The green space is over 10M² per person in Beylikdüzü. Almost in every street and avenue trees are planted at equal distance; making the whole neighborhood as an open-air museum. The construction of the botanical park in the huge valley between Adnan Kahveci and Cumhuriyet neighbourhood is still going on. The famous shopping malls Migros AVM perlavista AVM Istanbul Seafood Wholesale Market Hall in Kumkapı (in historical peninsula) is planned to be established in its new and bigger complex in Beylikdüzü. However, people with environmental awareness in Beylikdüzü have a concern that the new seafood market which is planned to be constructed by land reclamation on the Gürpinar coast of Beylikdüzü, can disturb the natural underwater current which cleans the Büyükçekmece Bay. Environmentalists fear that having the currents stopped the bay might turn into a sewage zone and lost all its beauty. Plus some experts claim that the seafood supply is mostly carried from the land not from the sea so it will add an unnecessary traffic pressure on the Beylikdüzü's existing road system.

== Composition ==
There are 10 neighbourhoods in Beylikdüzü District:

- Adnan Kahveci
- Barış
- Büyükşehir
- Cumhuriyet
- Dereağzı
- Gürpınar
- Kavaklı
- Marmara
- Sahil
- Yakuplu

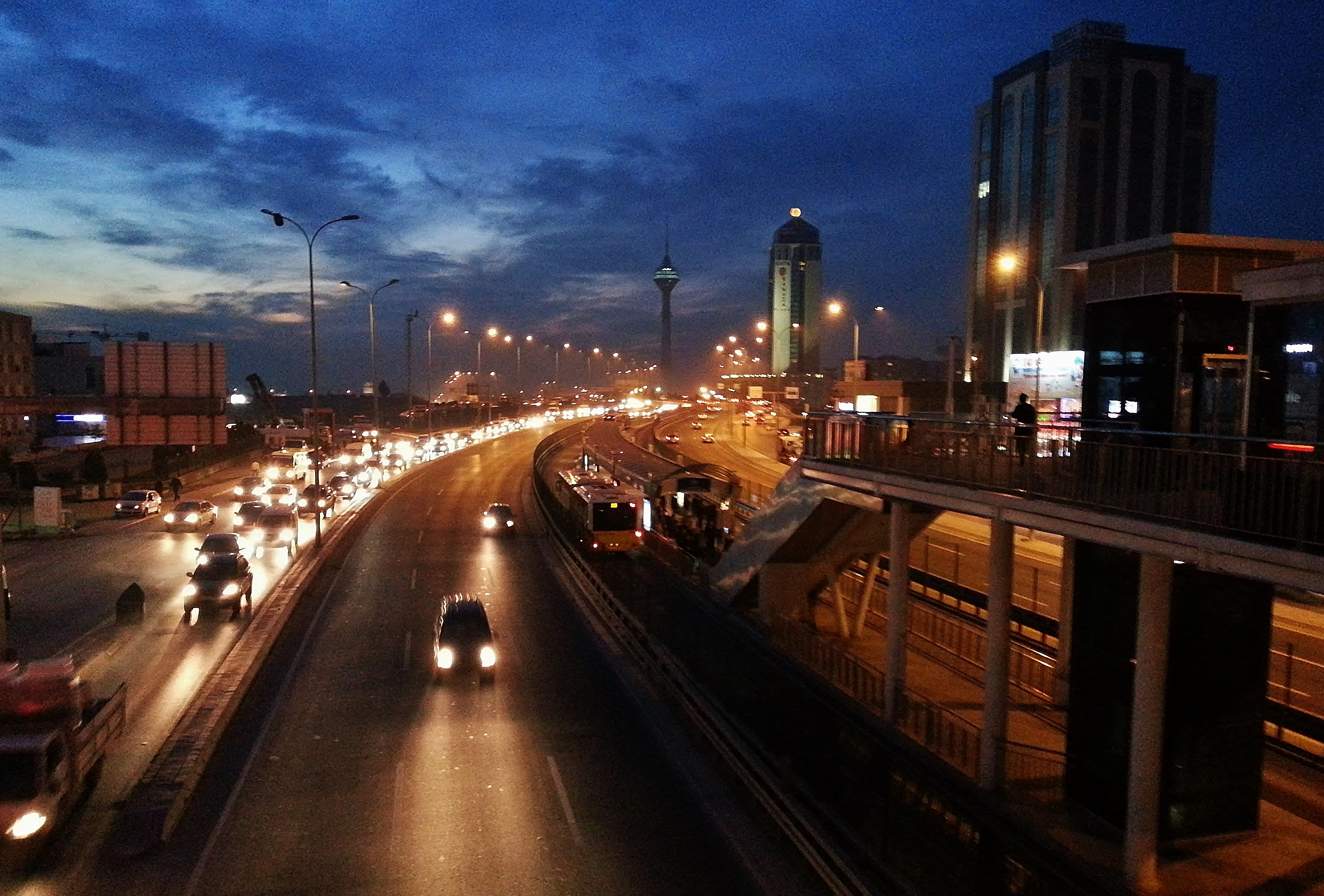
Beylikdüzü - Kadıköy Metrobus Line, Beykent Station

== Gallery ==
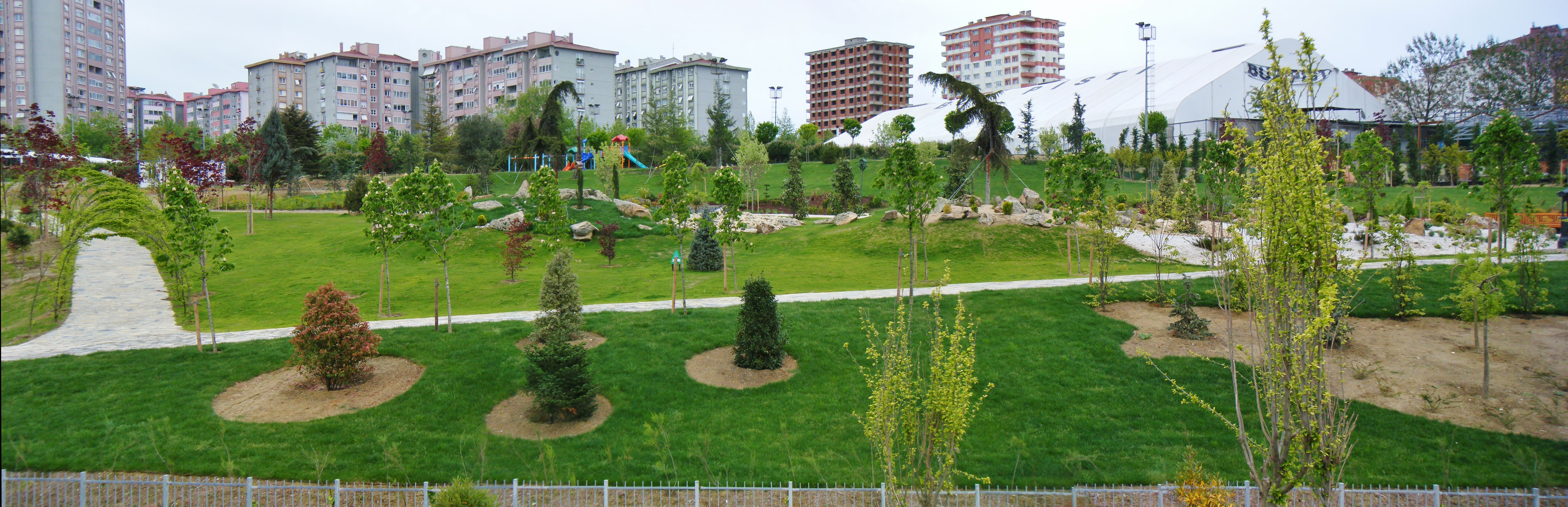
Beylikduzu Green Valley Botanical City Park.

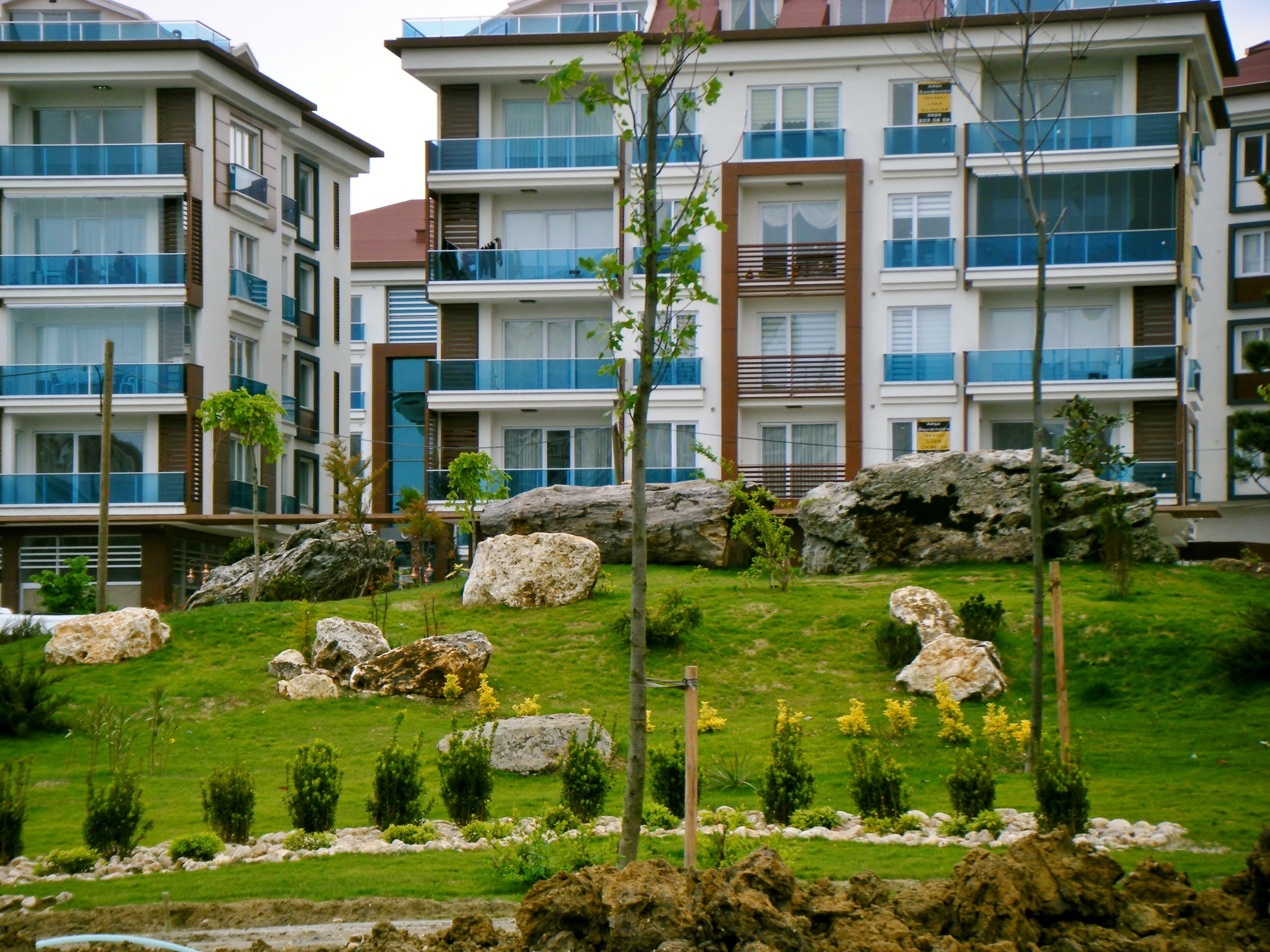
Beylikduzu Green Valley Botanical City Park.

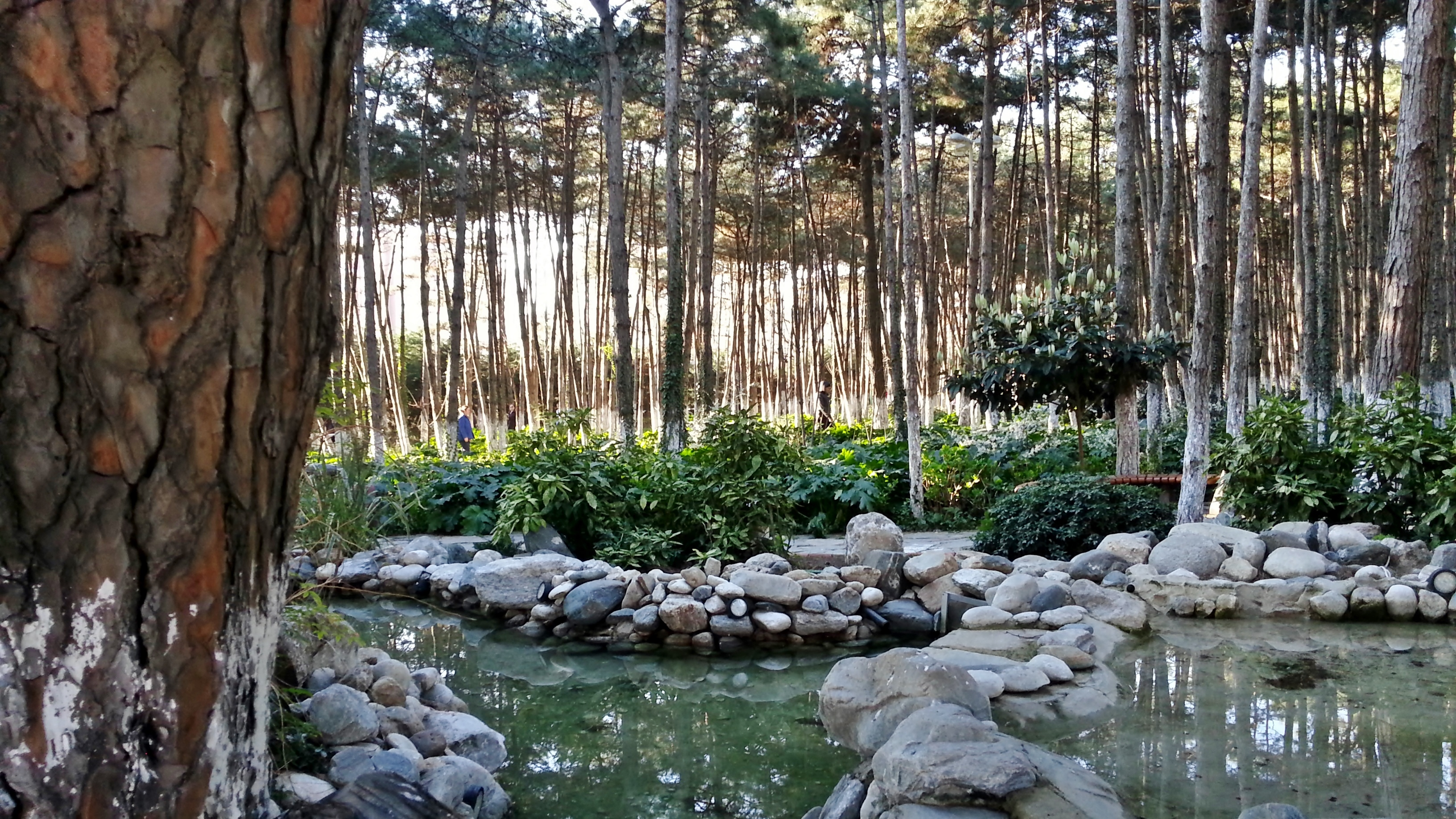
Beylikdüzü Grove.

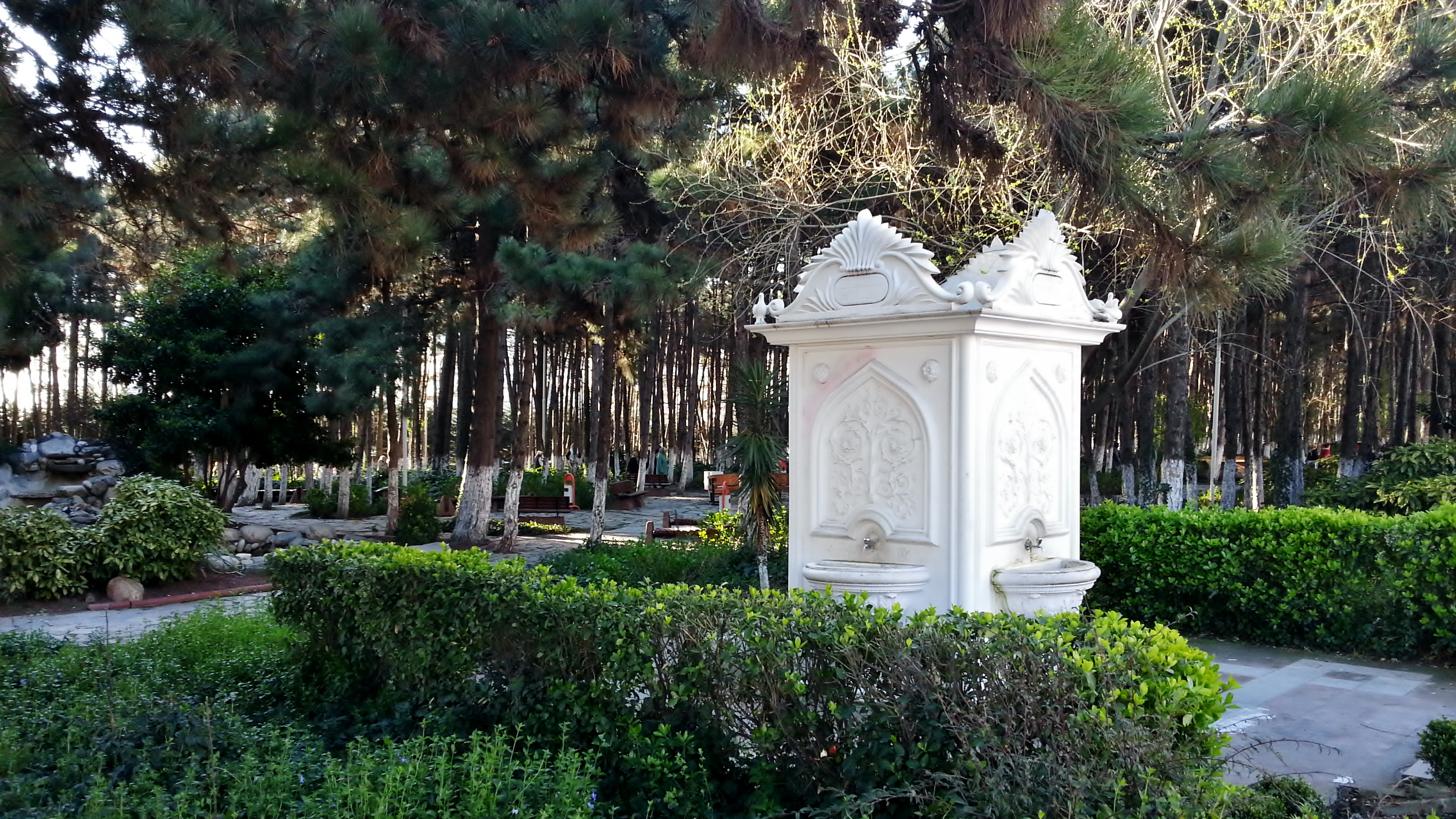
Beylikdüzü Square, Fountain.

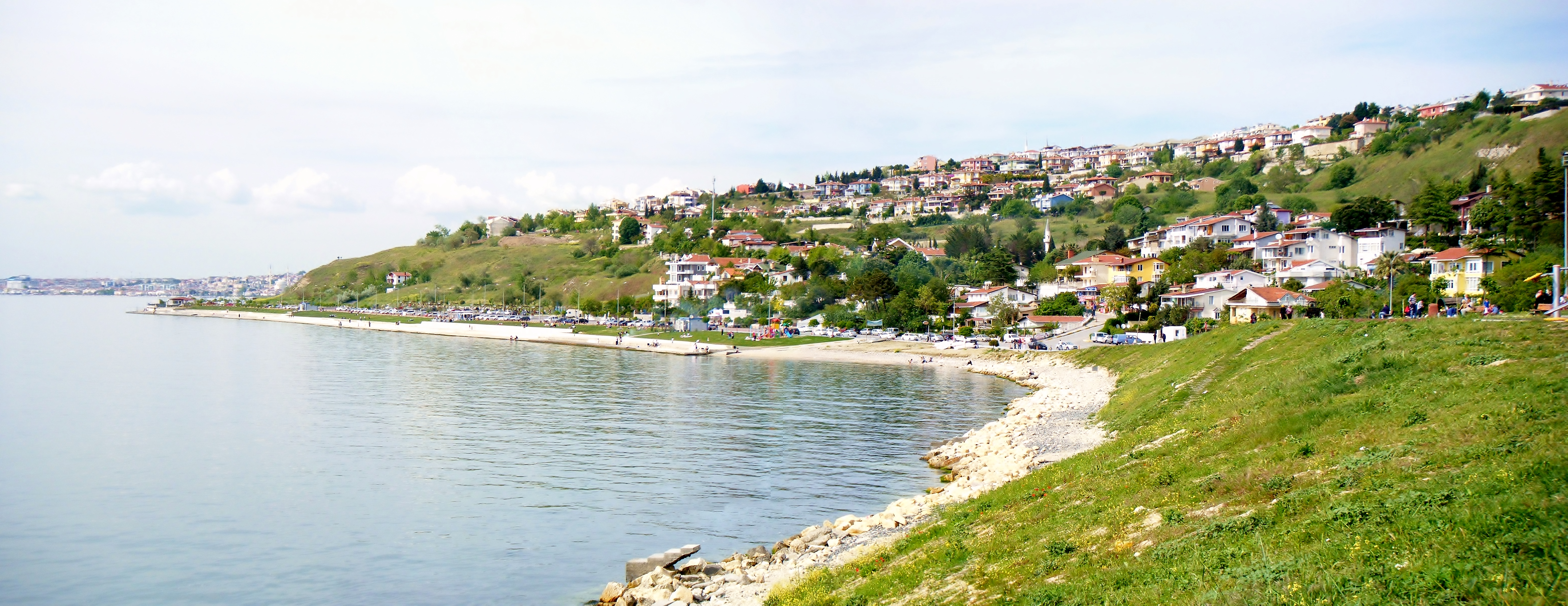
Beylikdüzü Seaside.

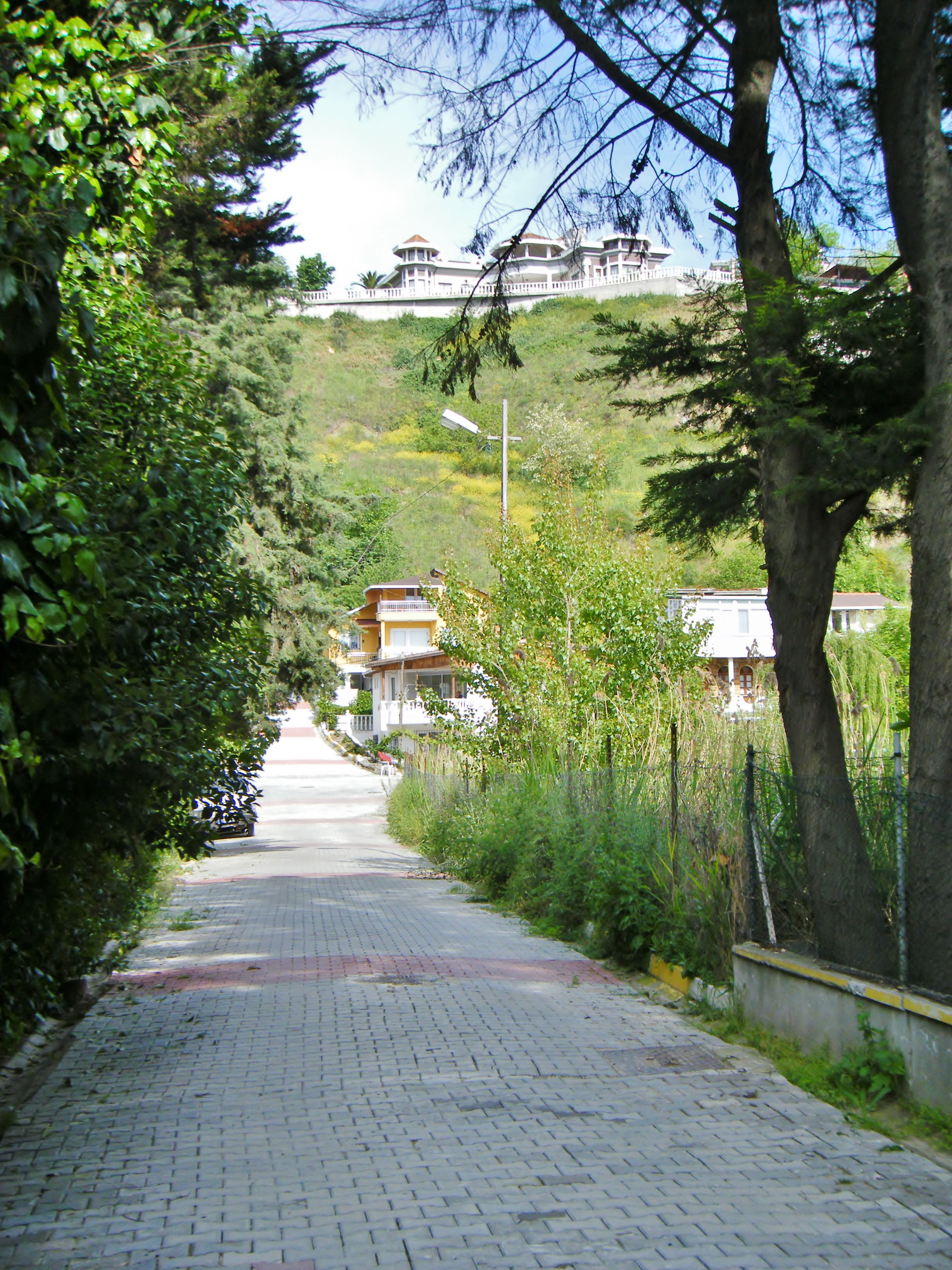
Steep slopes in Beylikdüzü.

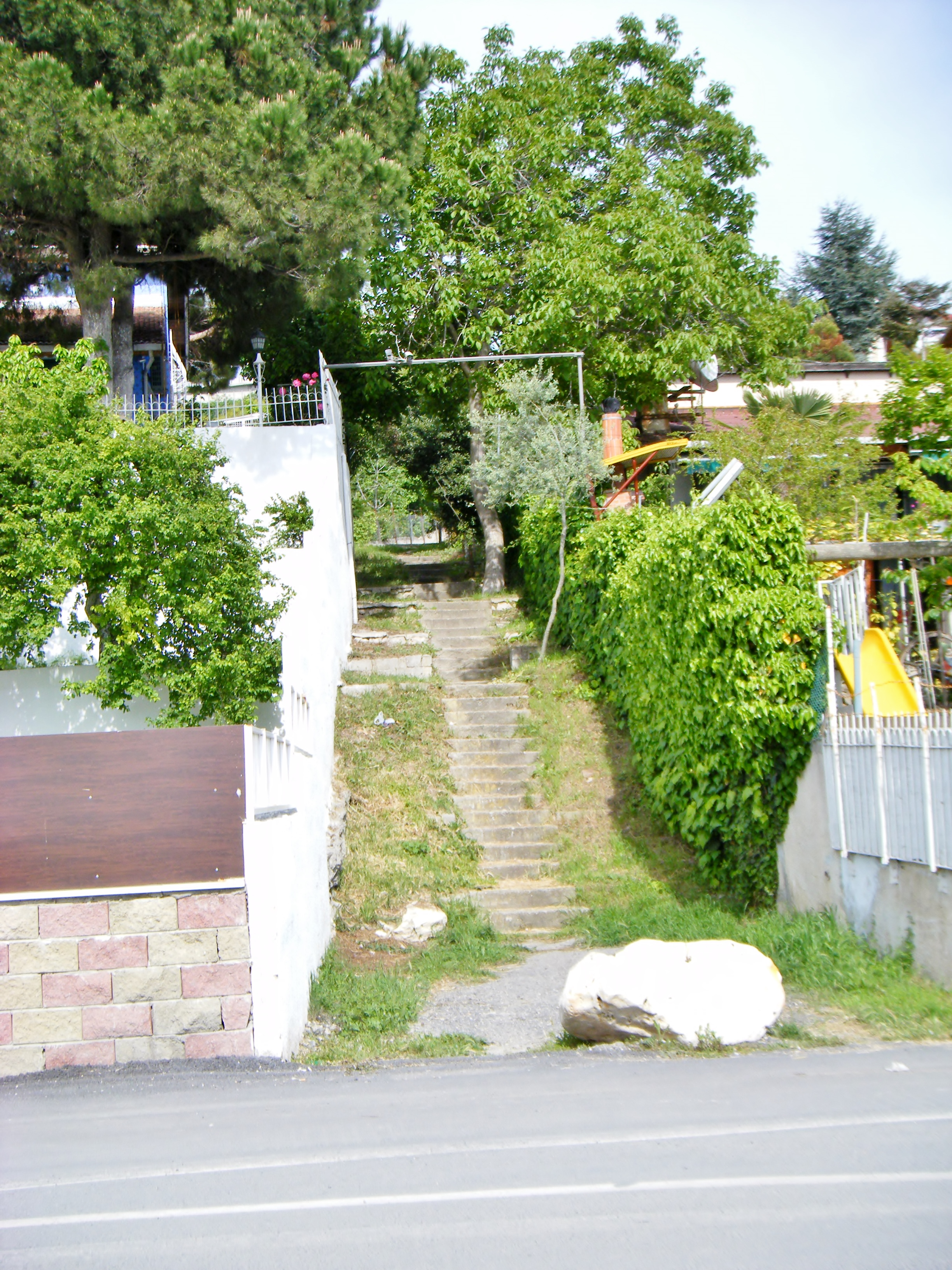
Seaside Area.

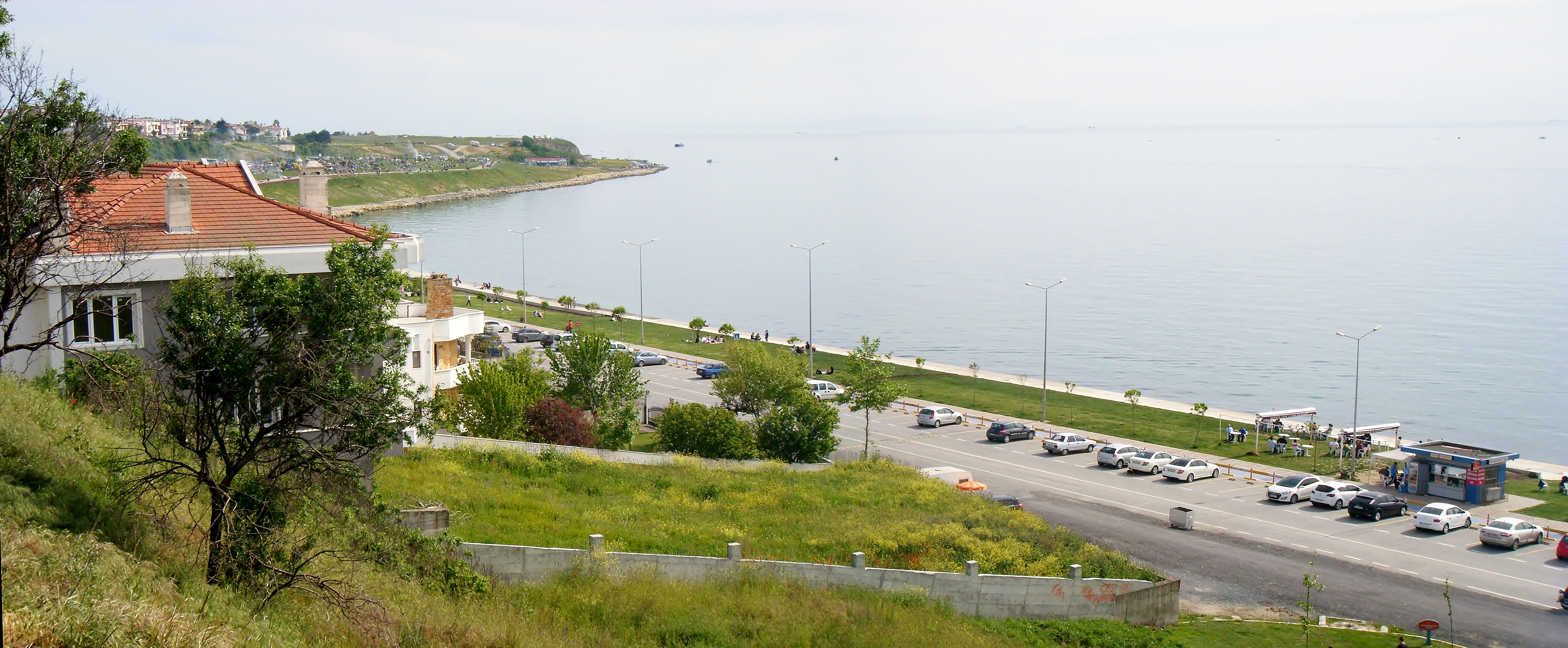
Beylikdüzü waterfront.

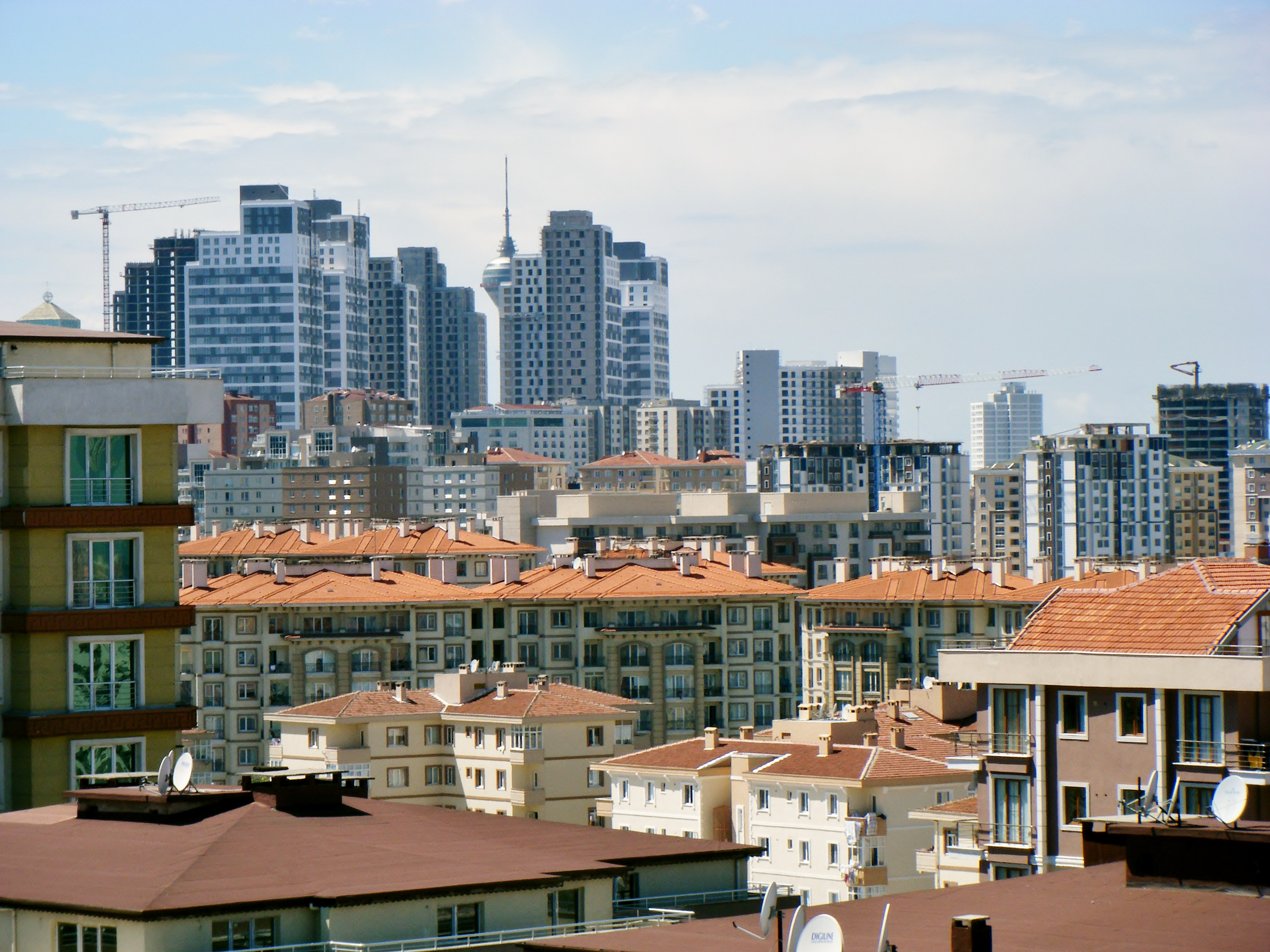
Esenyurt region of Beylikduzu; Urbanisation at its most extreme.

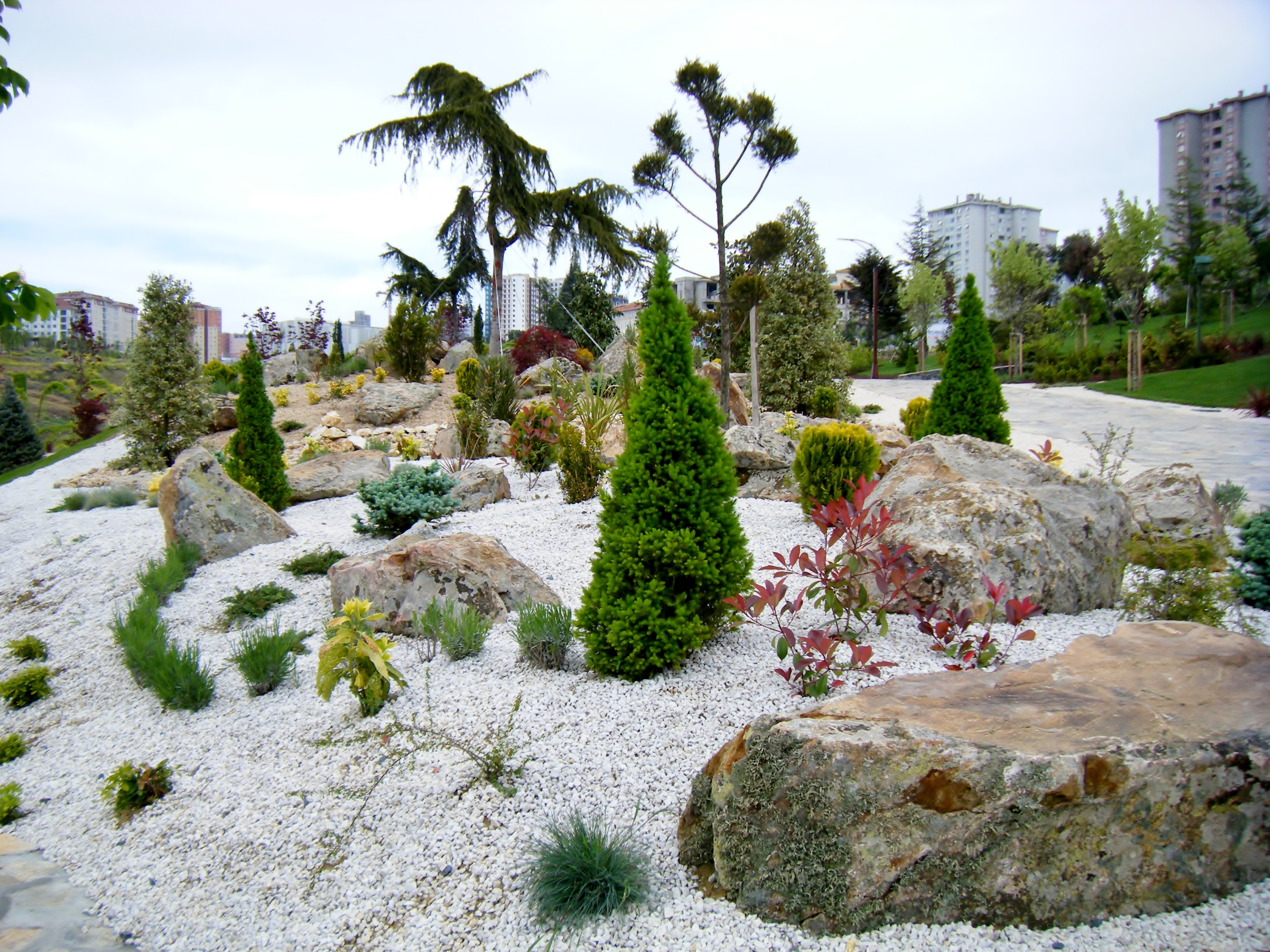
Beylikduzu Green Valley Botanical City Park.

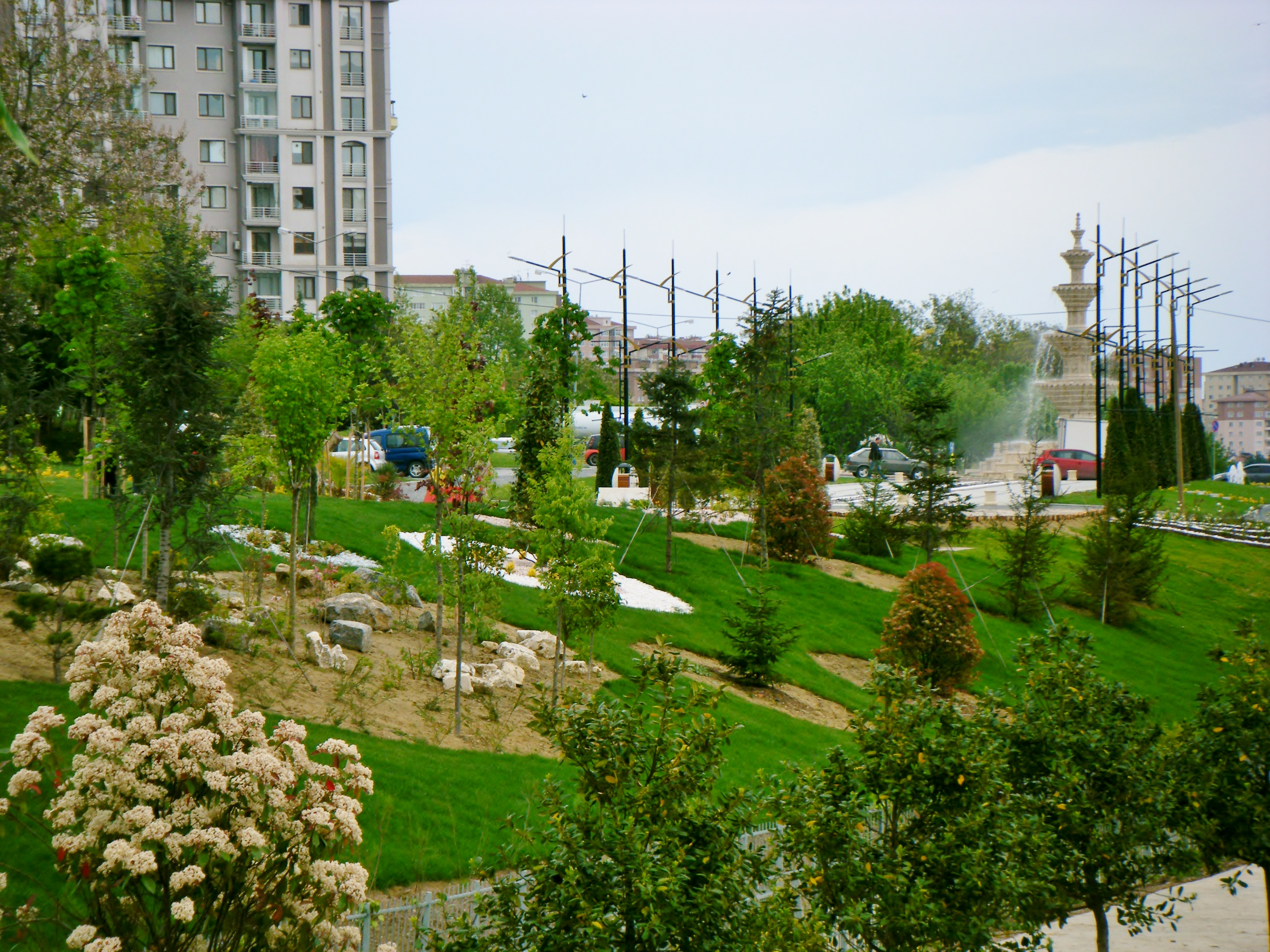
Beylikduzu Green Valley Botanical City Park.

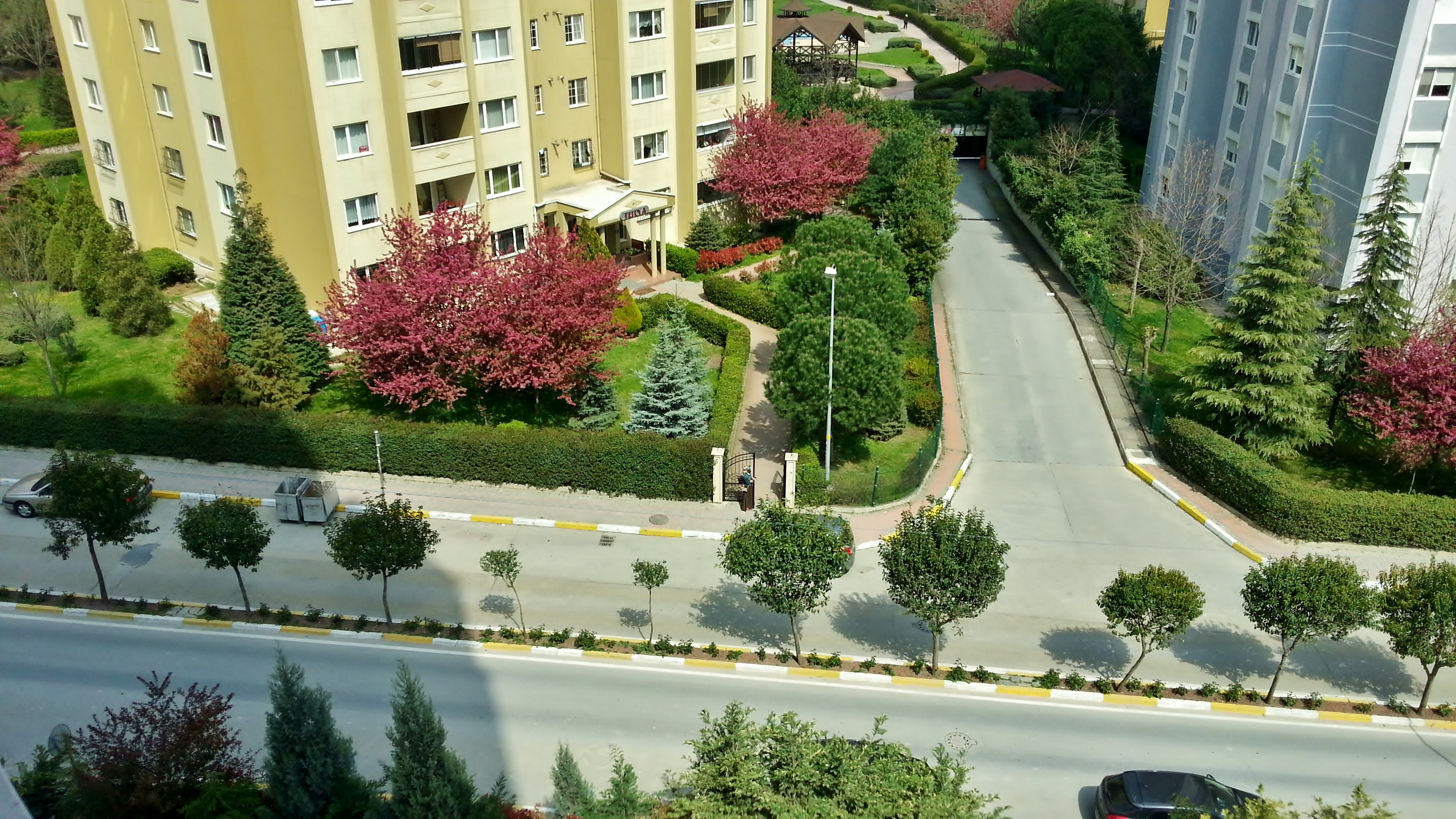
Adnan Kahveci Neighbourhood, Pasabahce Street.

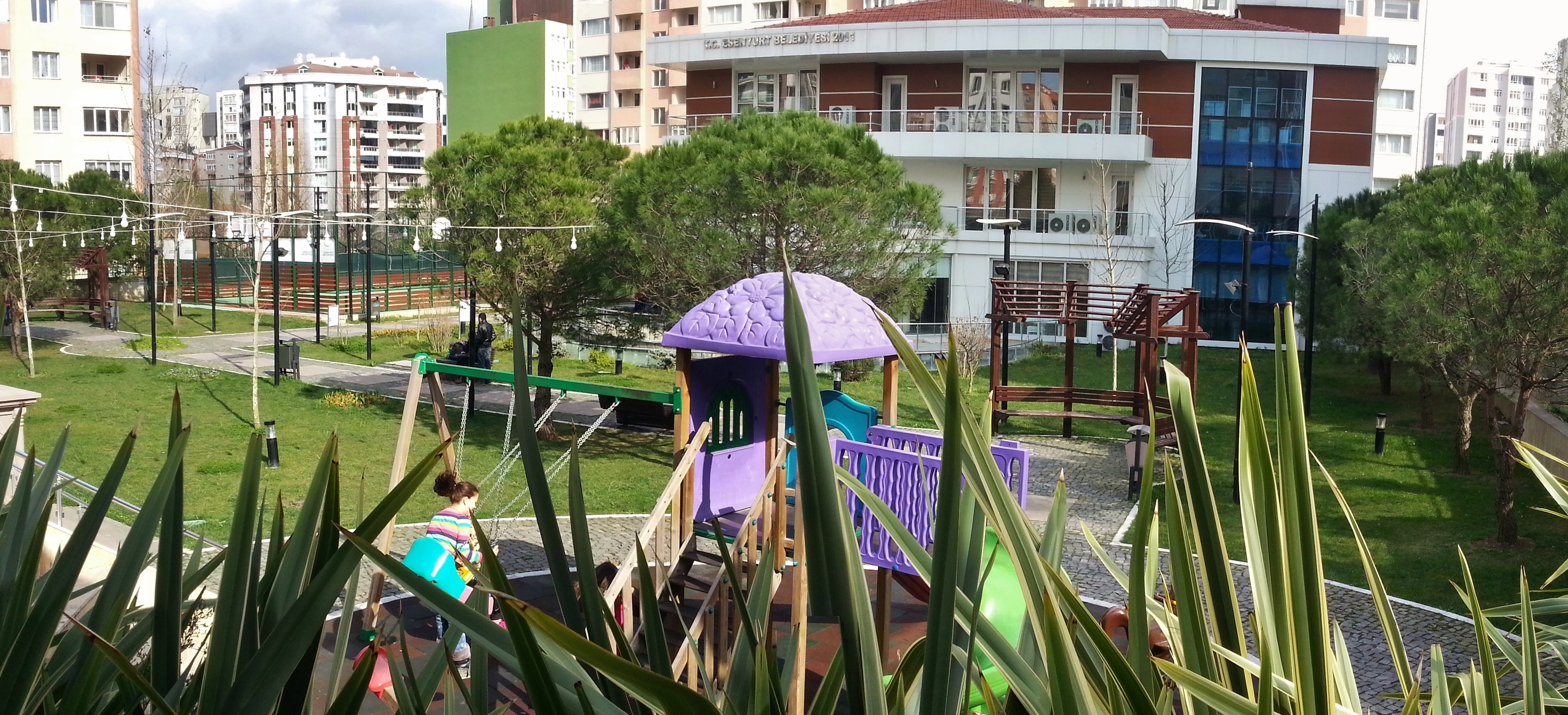
Yunus Balta Center of Culture.

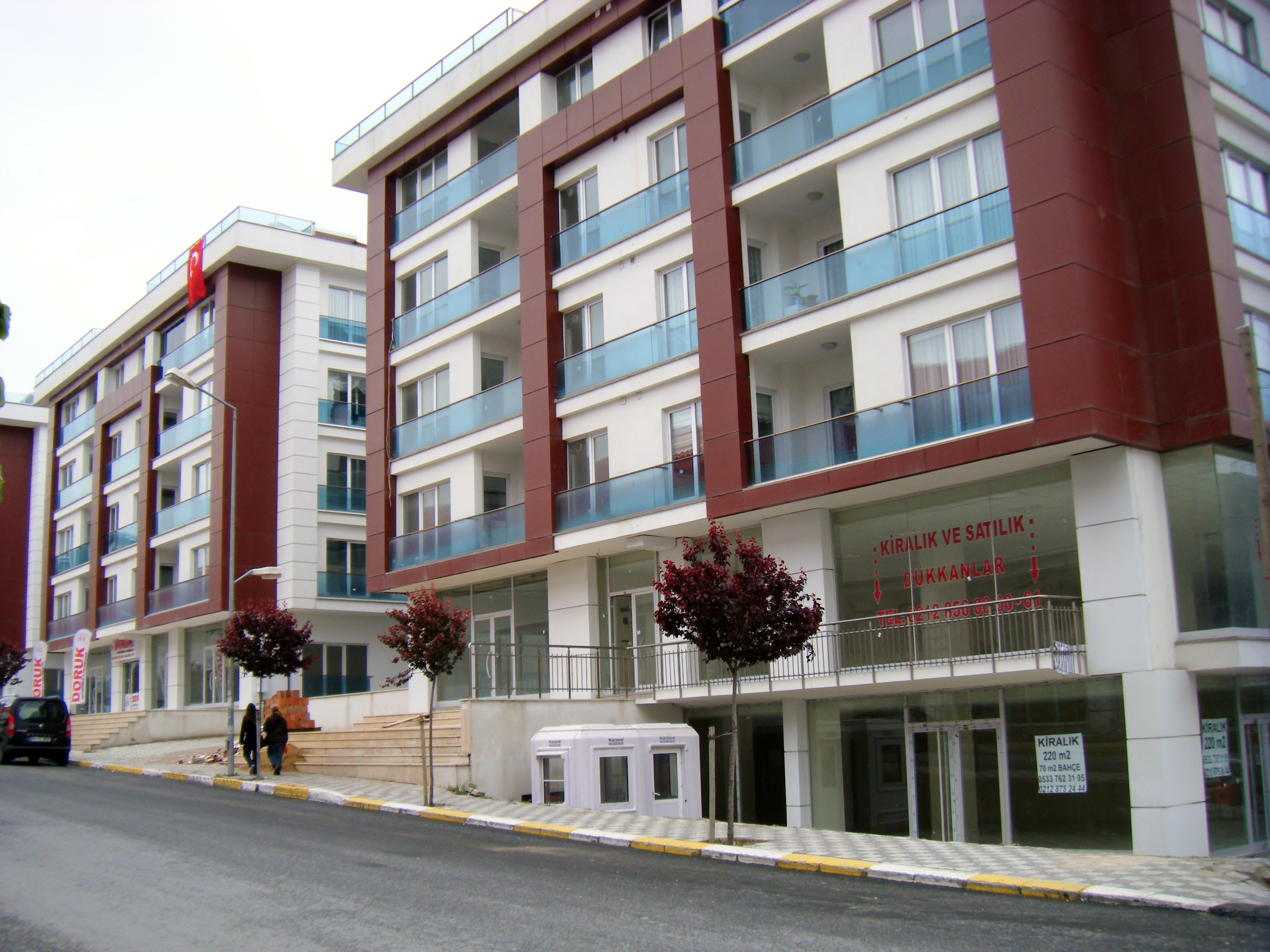
Erenler Street.

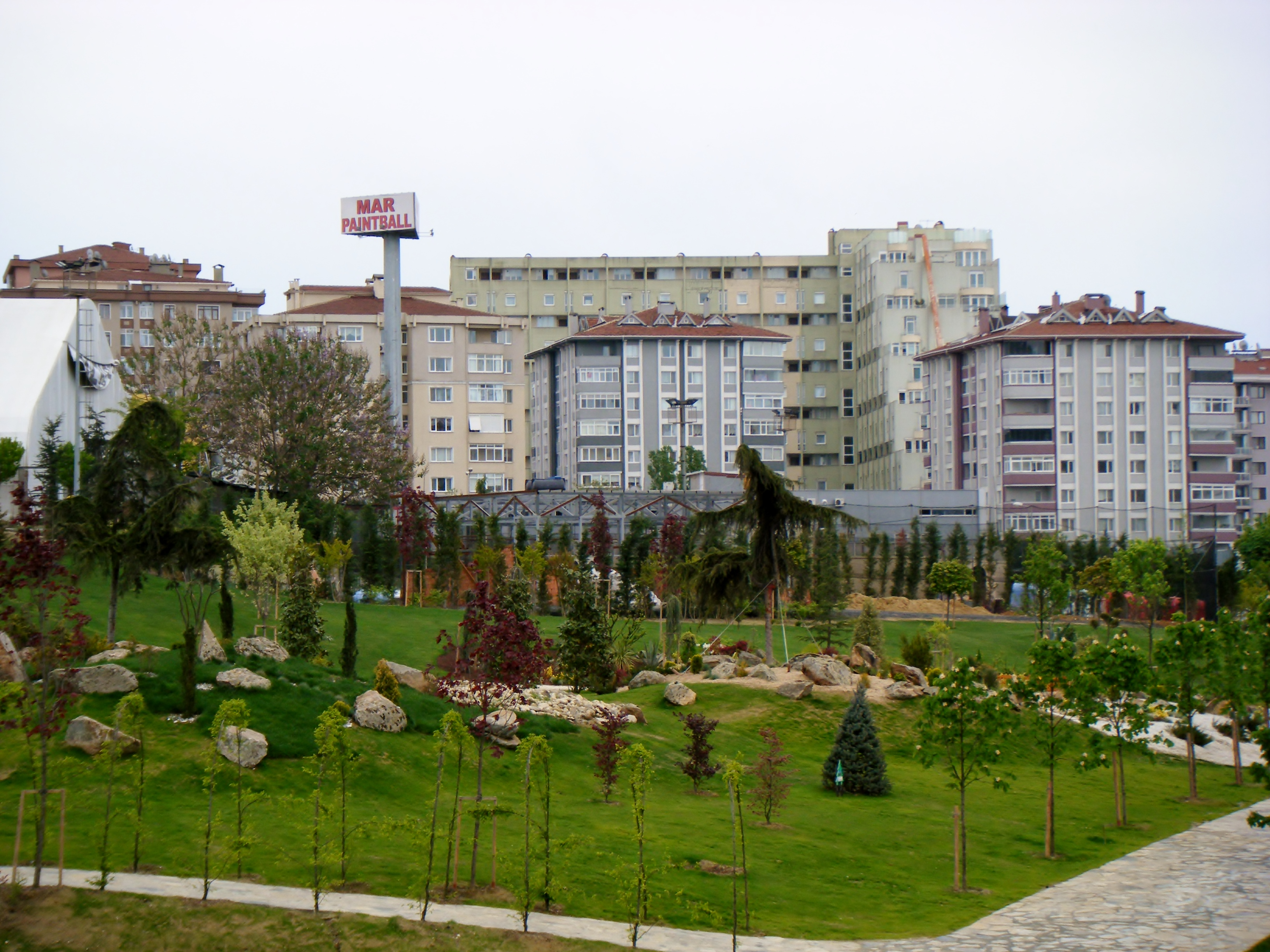
Cumhuriyet Neighbourhood.

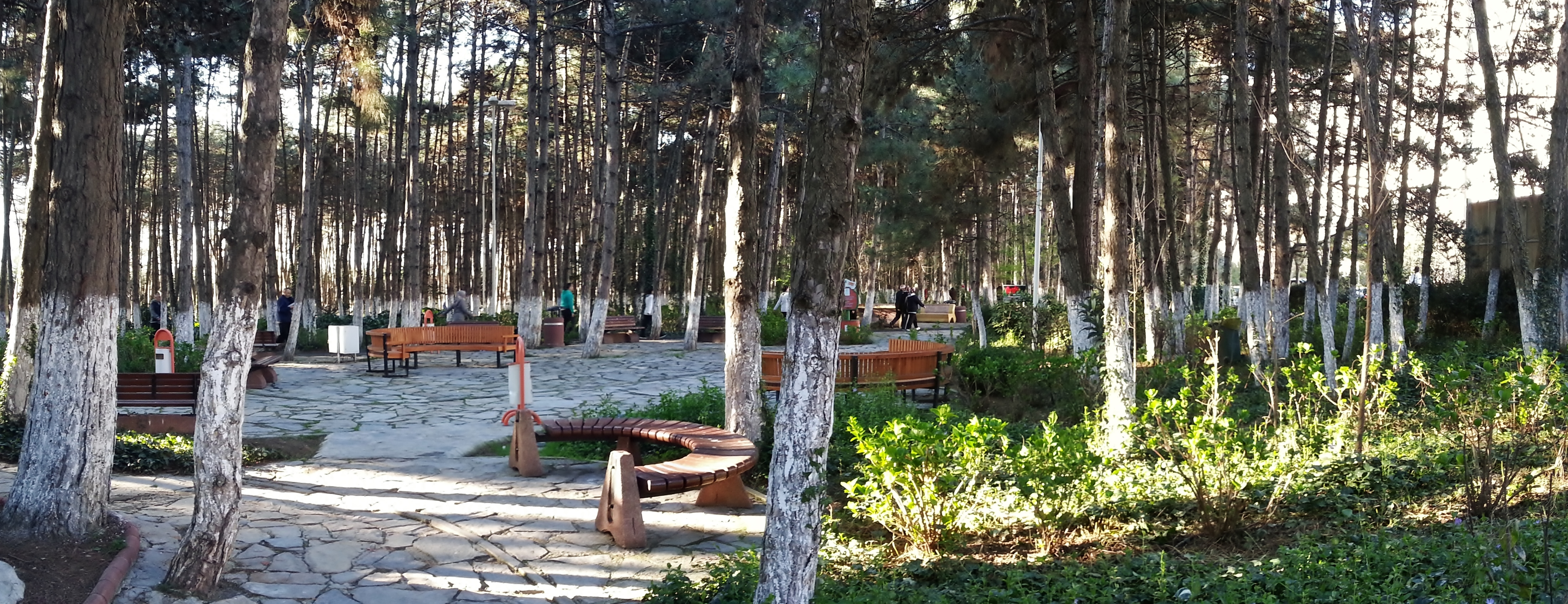
Beylikduzu Municipality Grove.

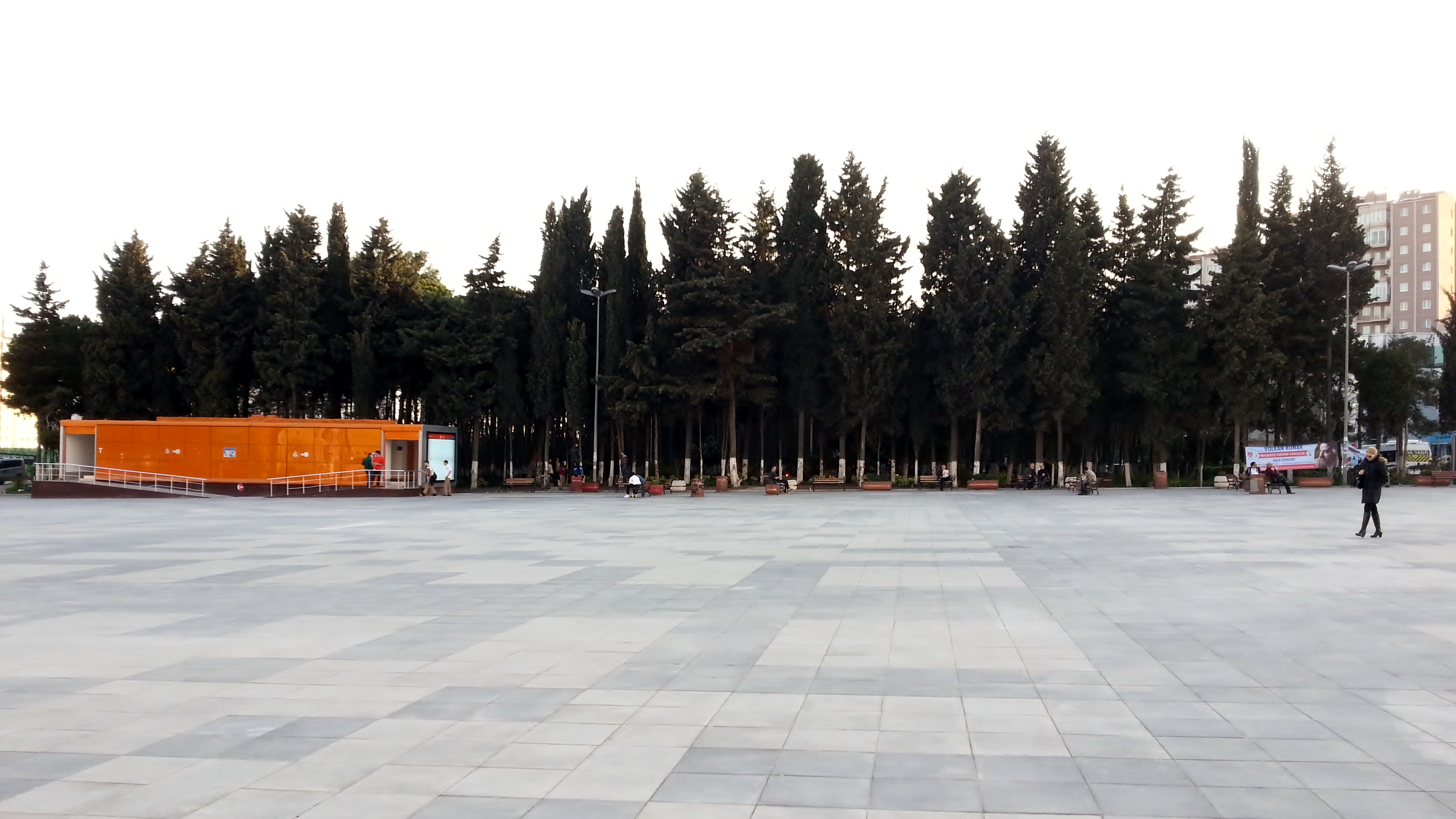
Beylikduzu Square.

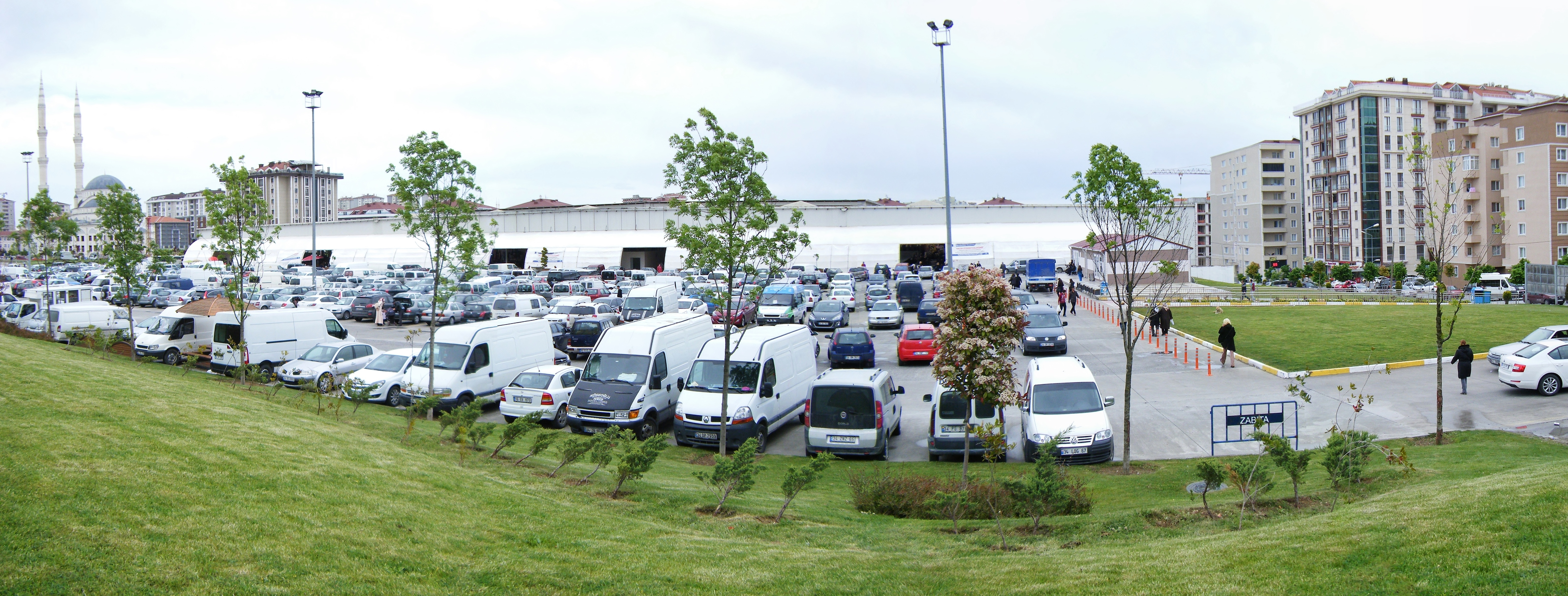
Beykent Bazaar.

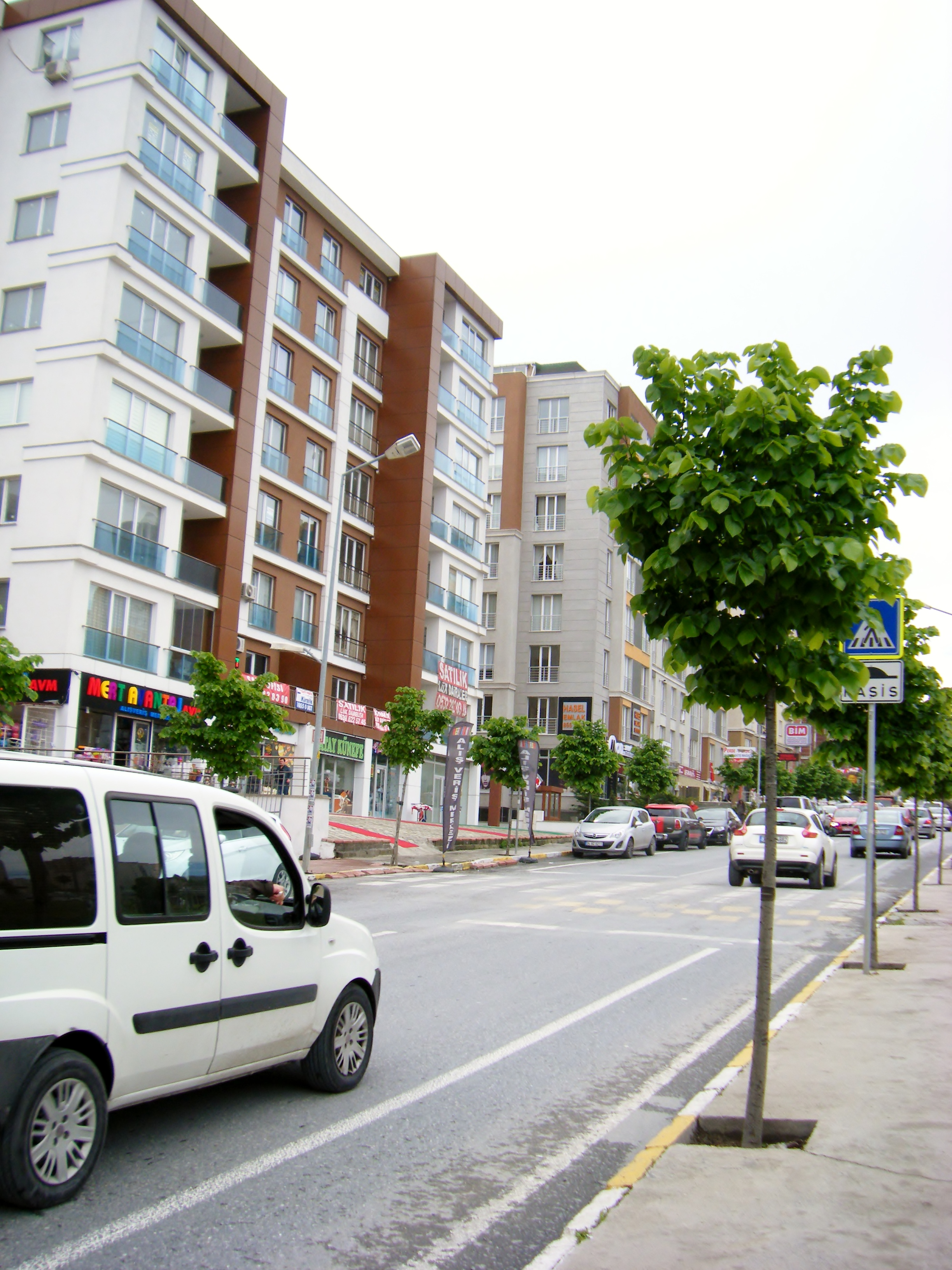
Anadolu Street.

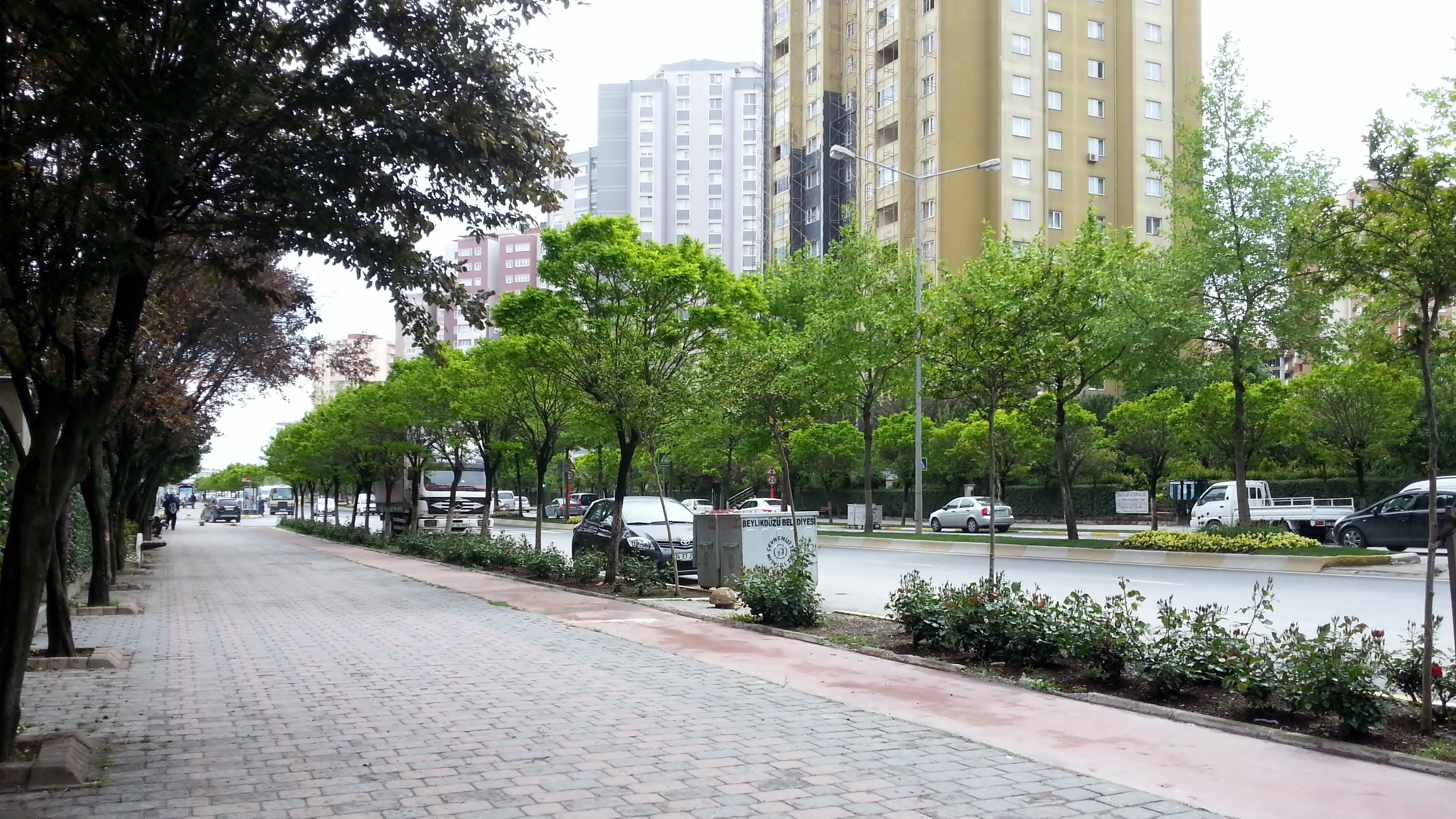
Yavuz Sultan Selim Boulevard.

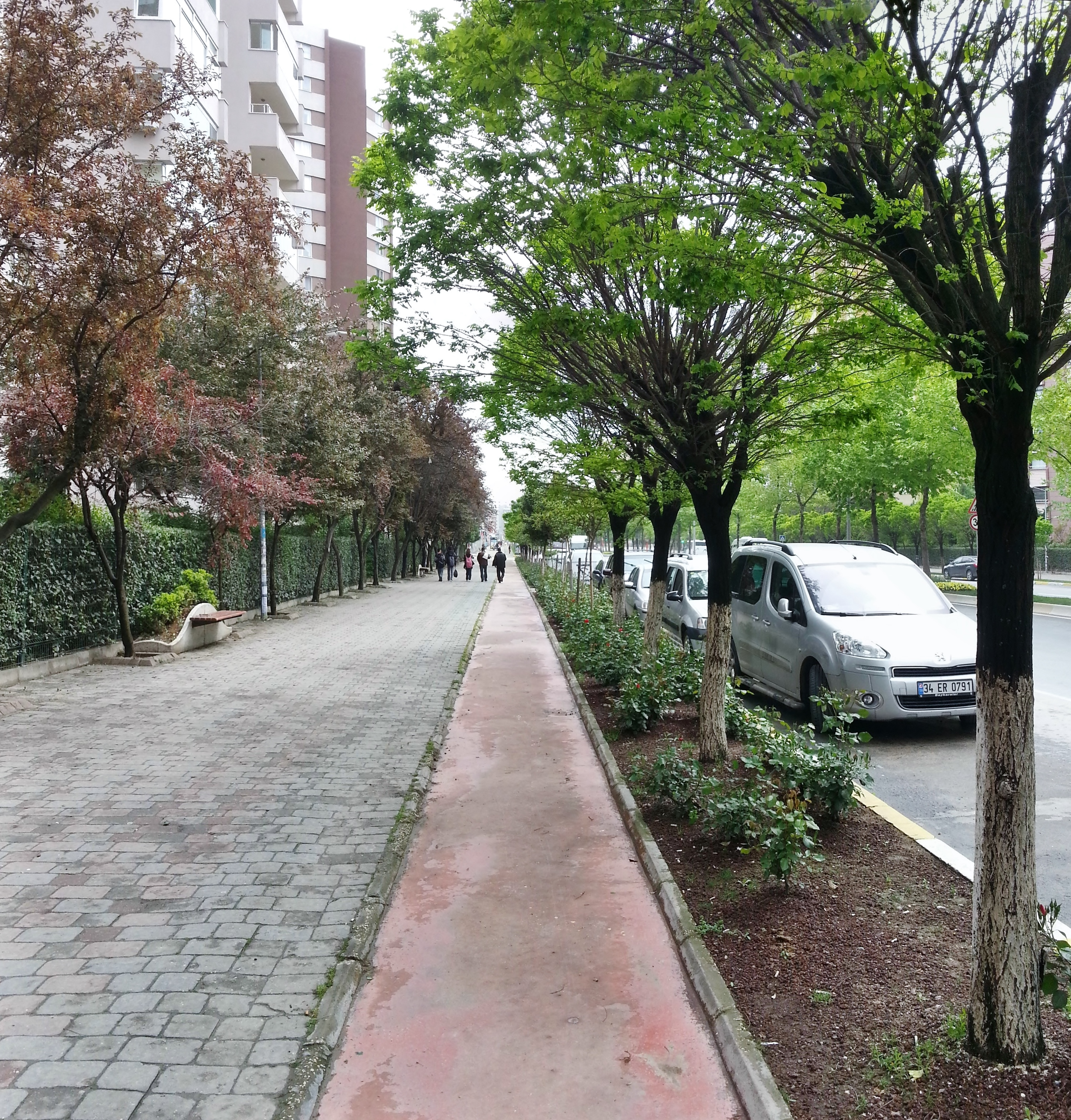
Beylikduzu Bicycle Lanes .

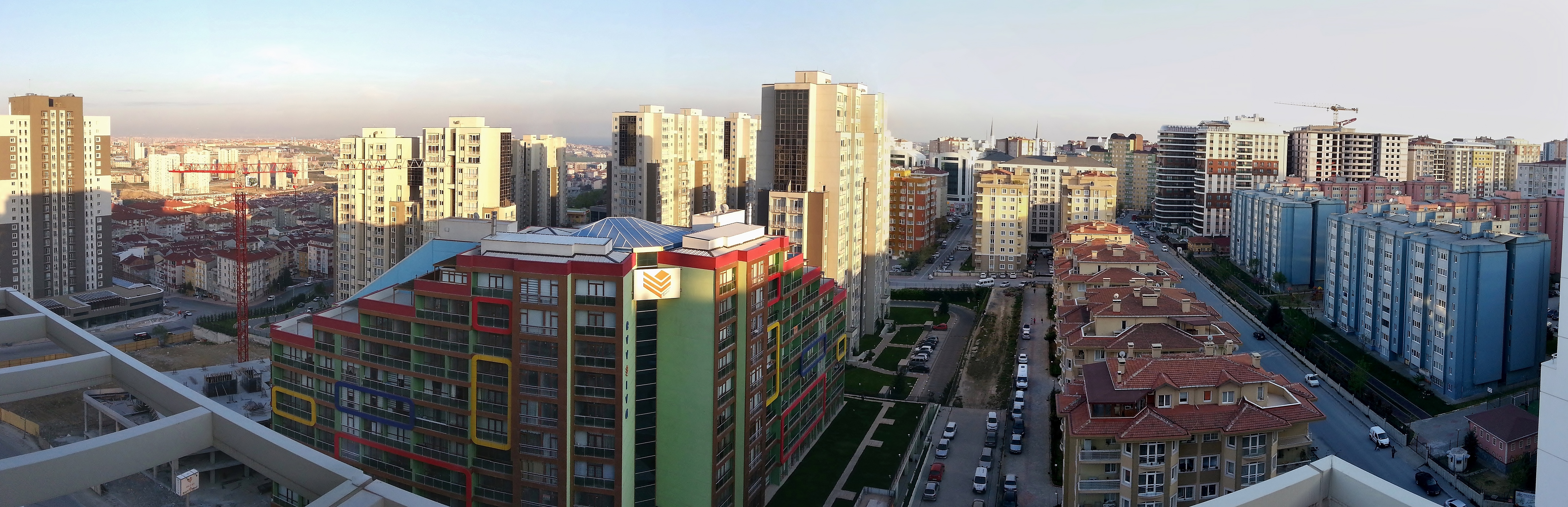
Esenyurt Beylikduzu district view.

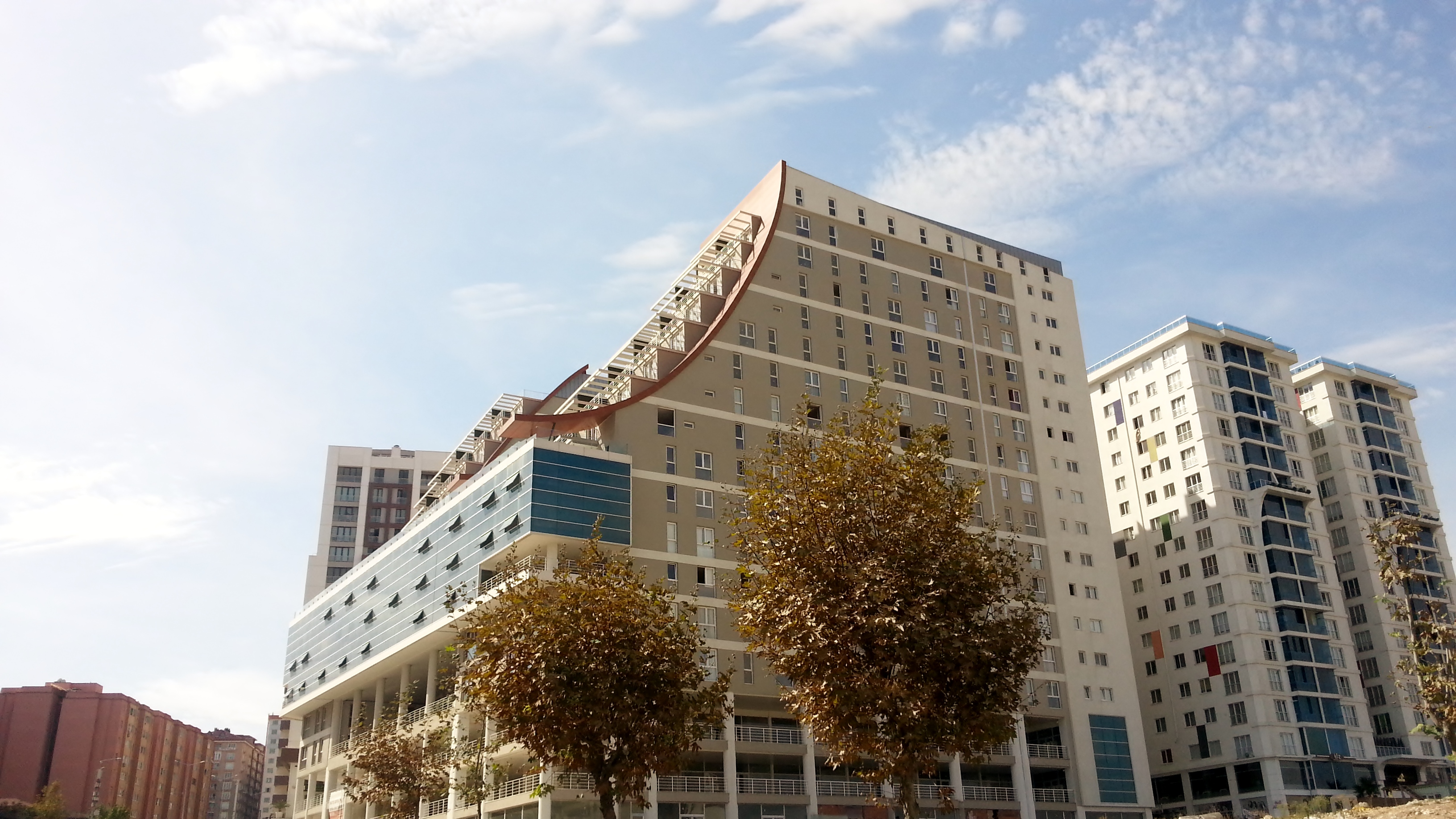
Modern buildings in Esenyurt Beylikduzu district.

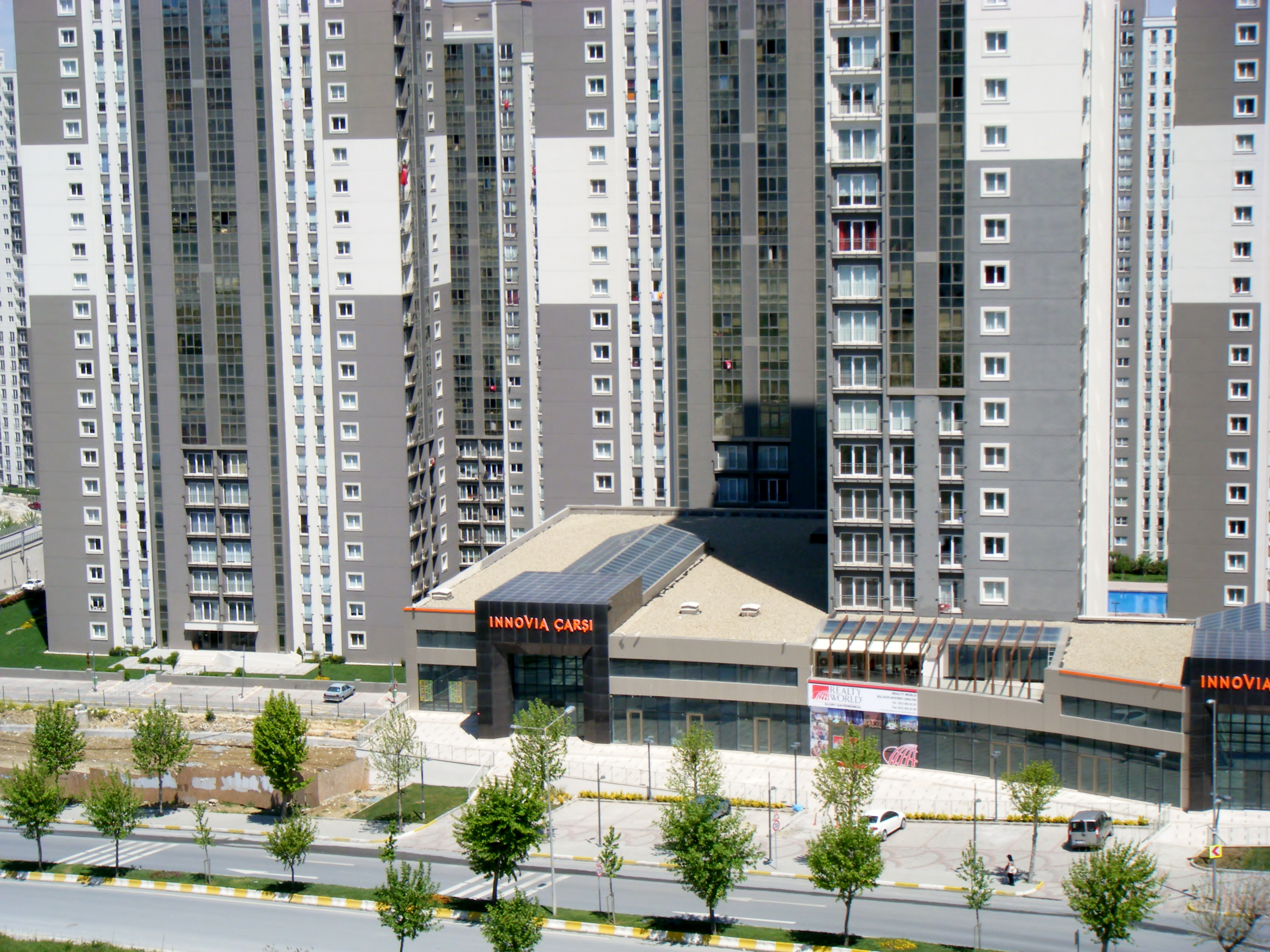
Esenyurt/Beylikduzu District Innovia Blocks.

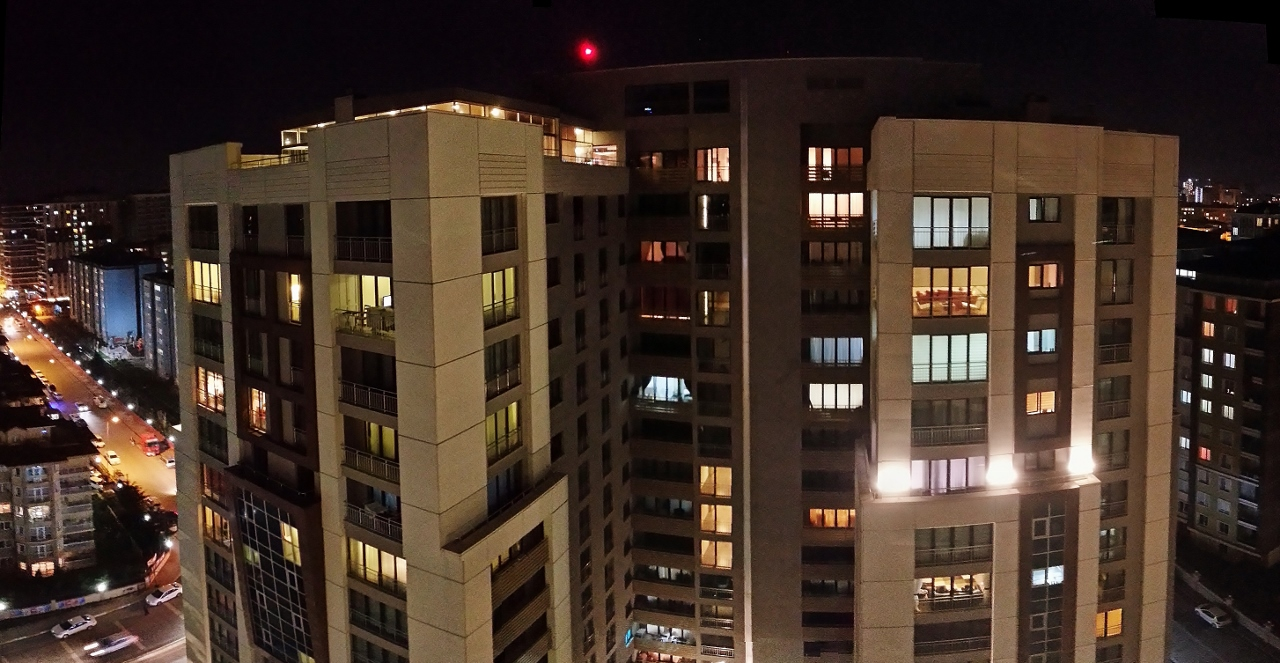
Beylikduzu at night.

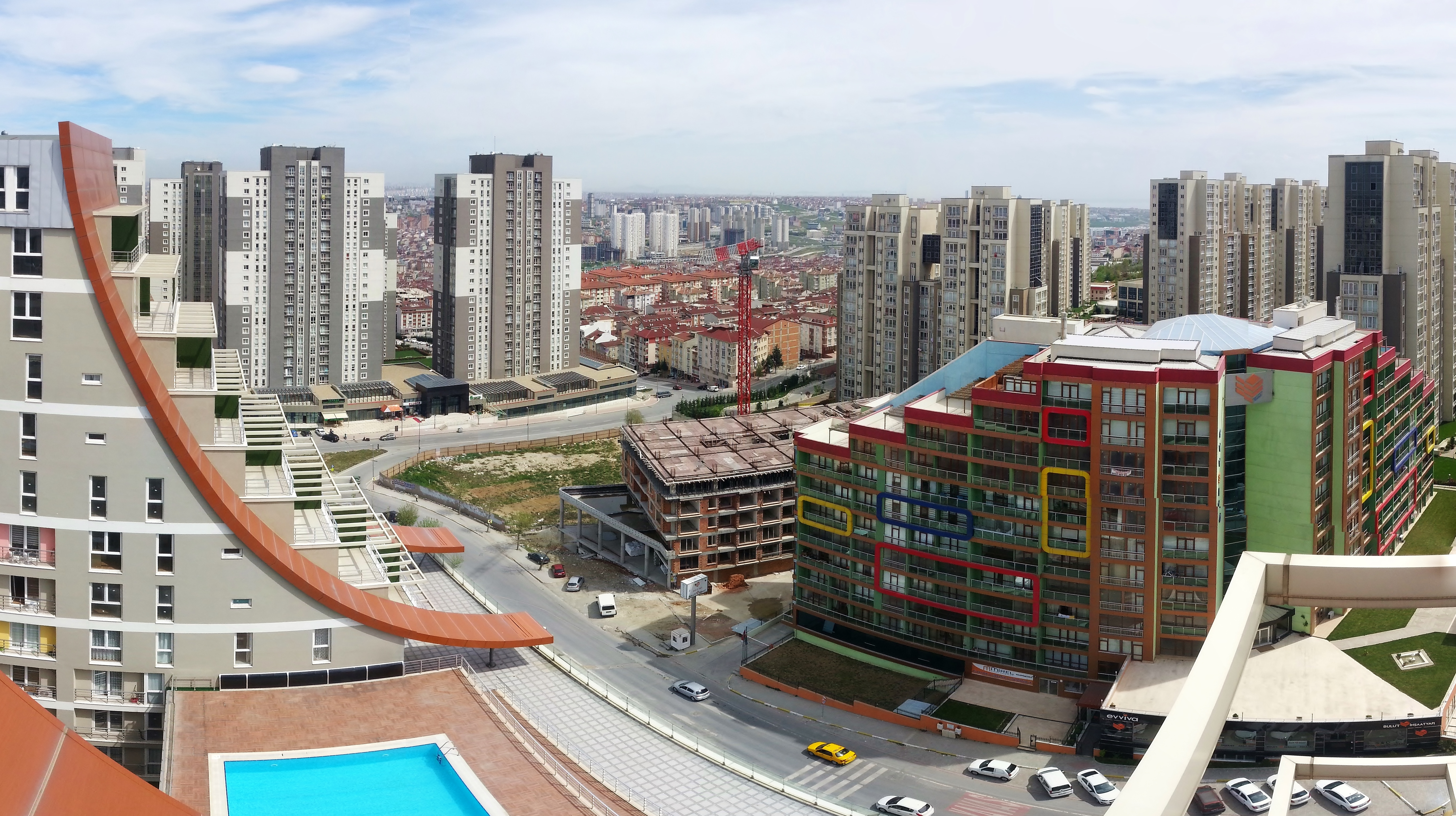
Esenyurt Beylikduzu district Skyline.

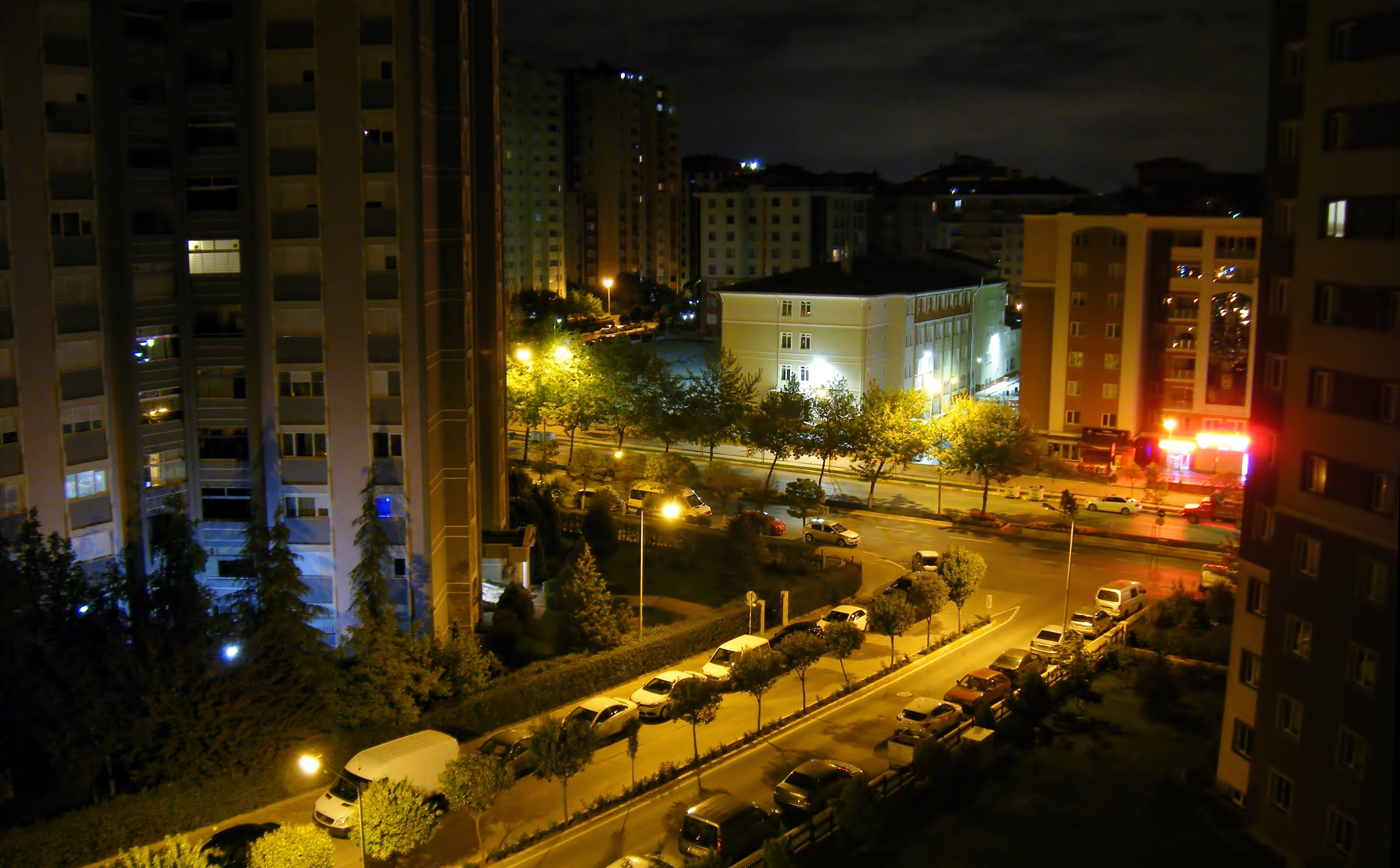
Pasabahce Street at night.

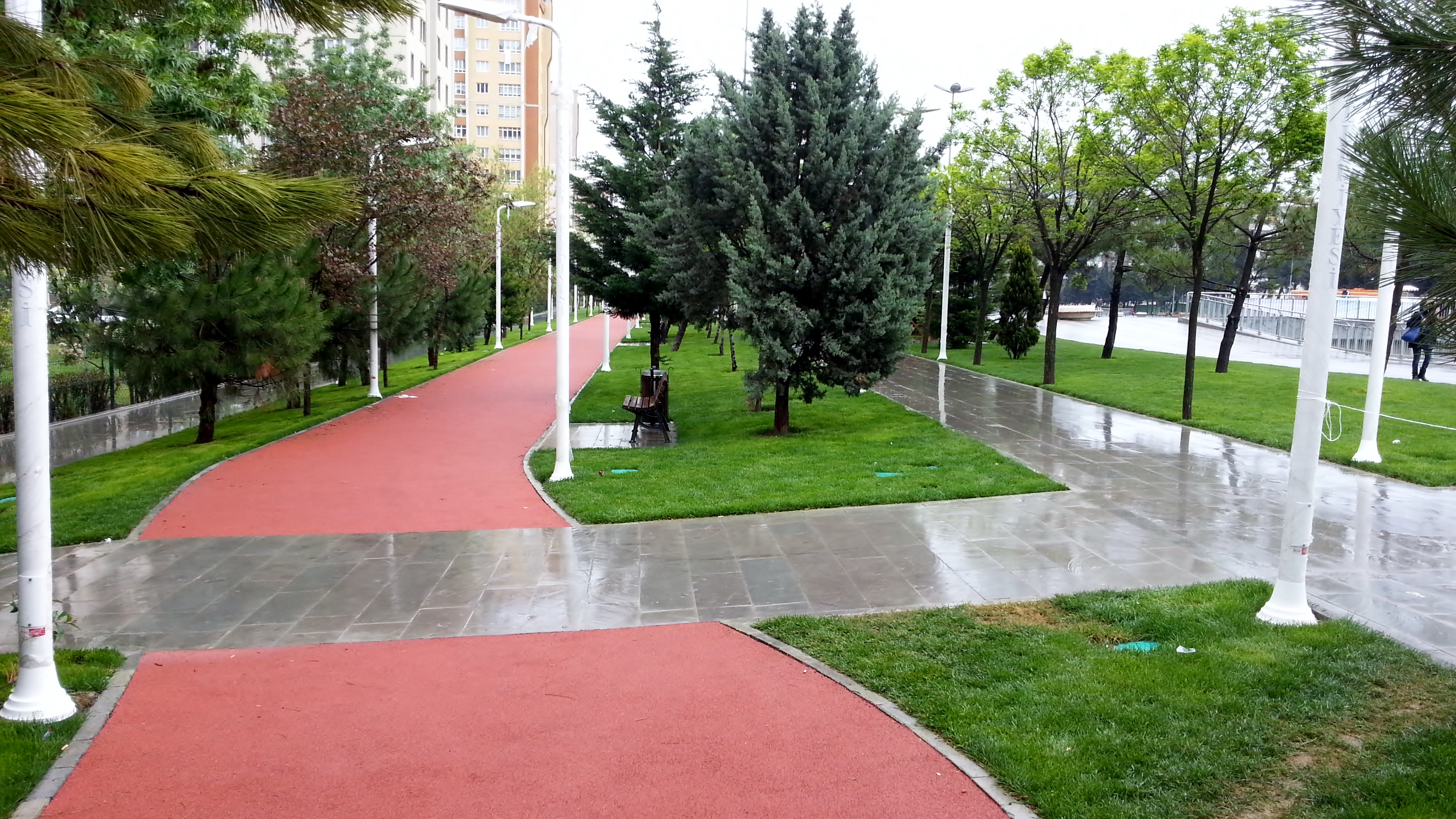
Beylikduzu Square Park.

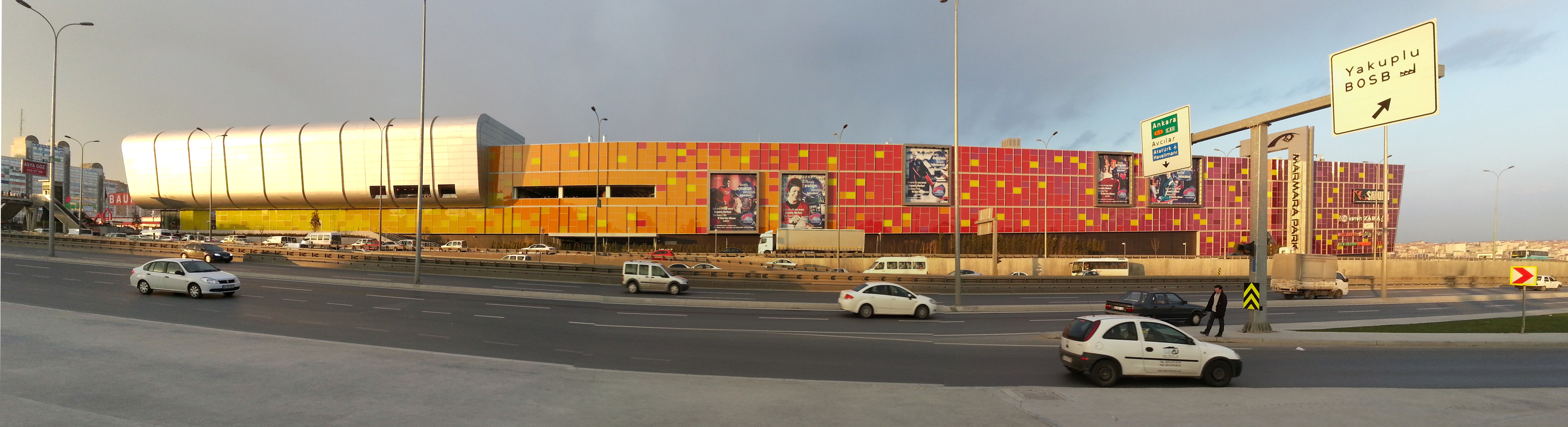
Marmarapark Shopping Mall.

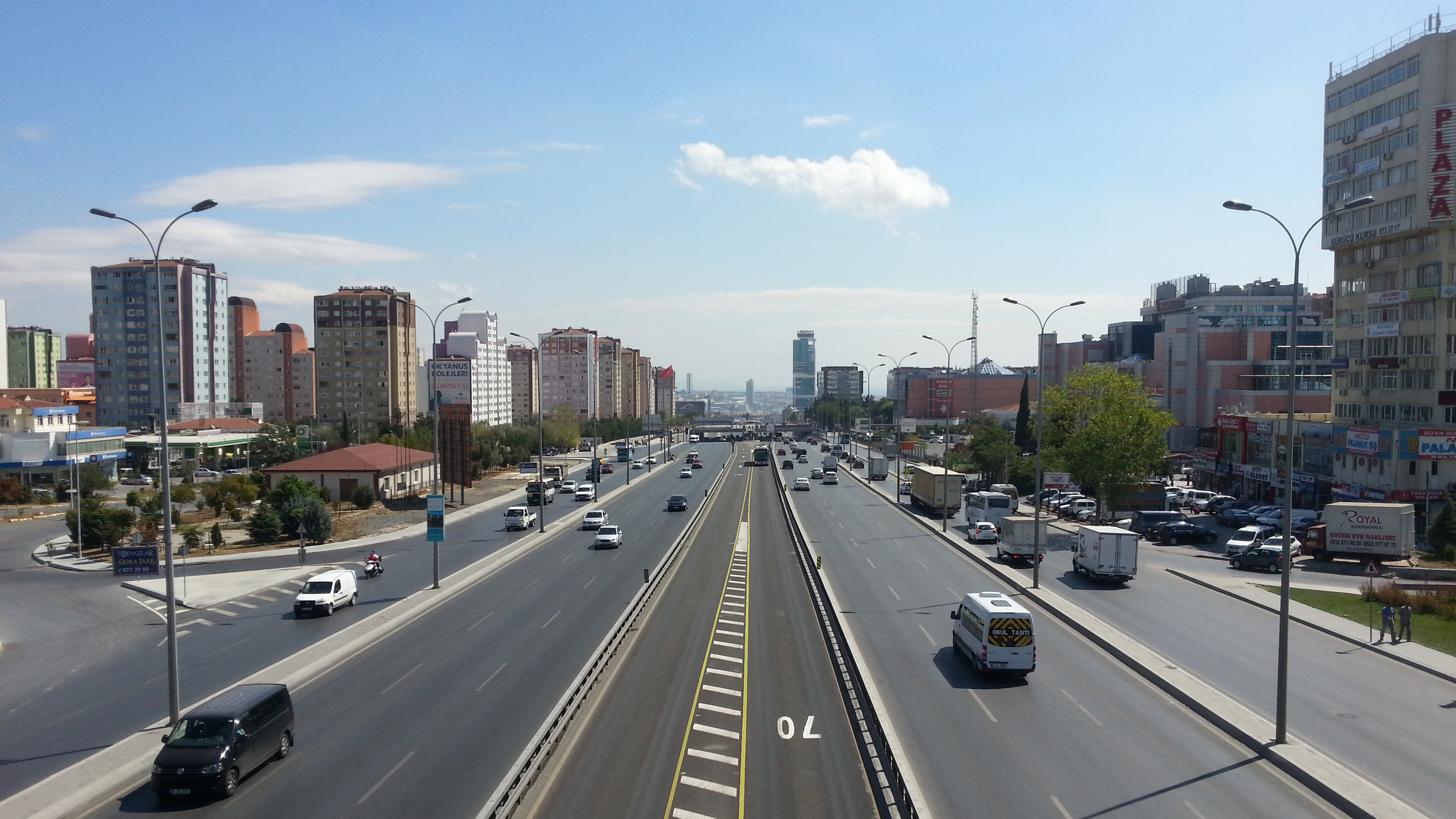
E-5 (D100) Highway.

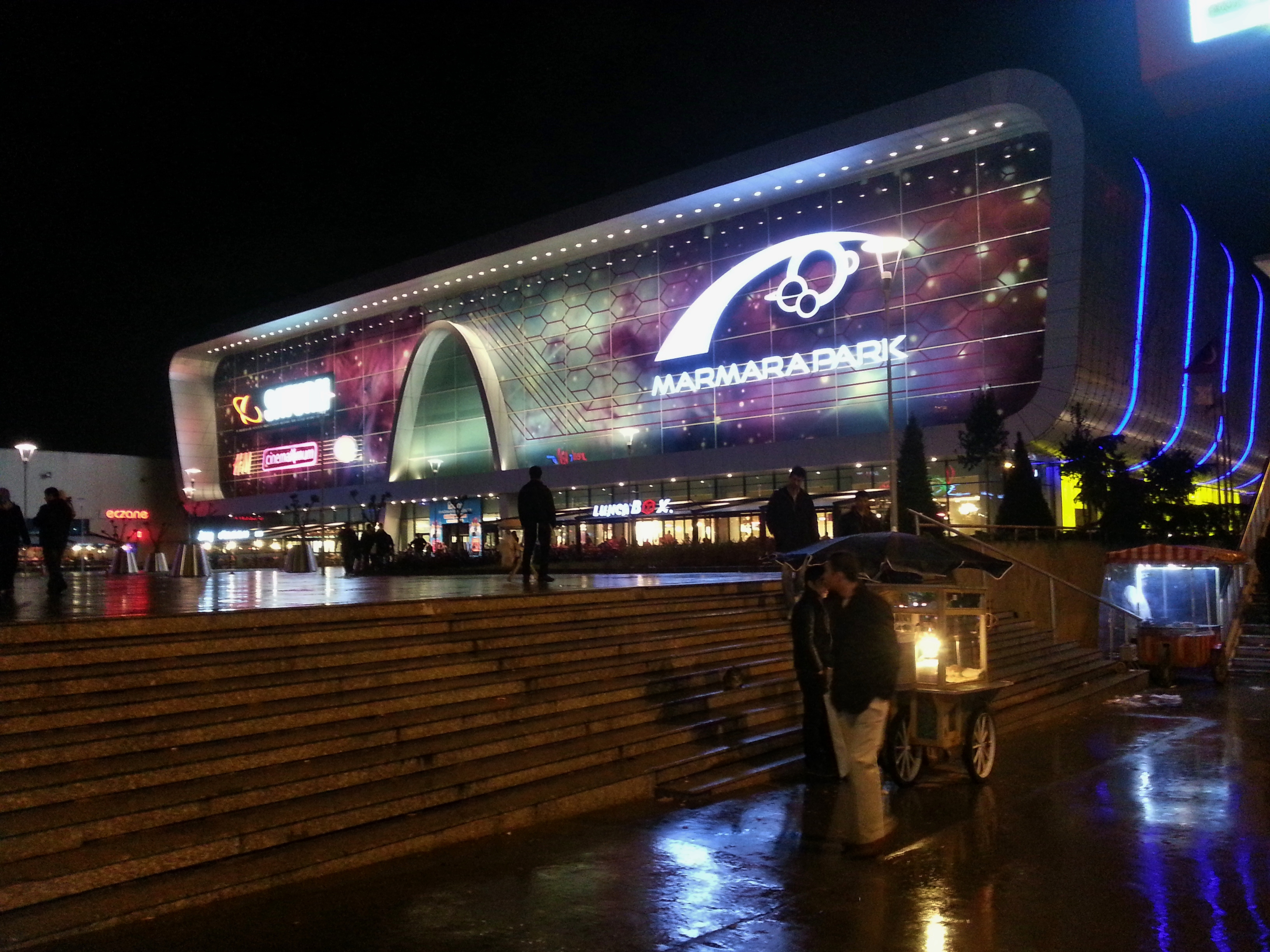
Marmarapark Shopping Mall.

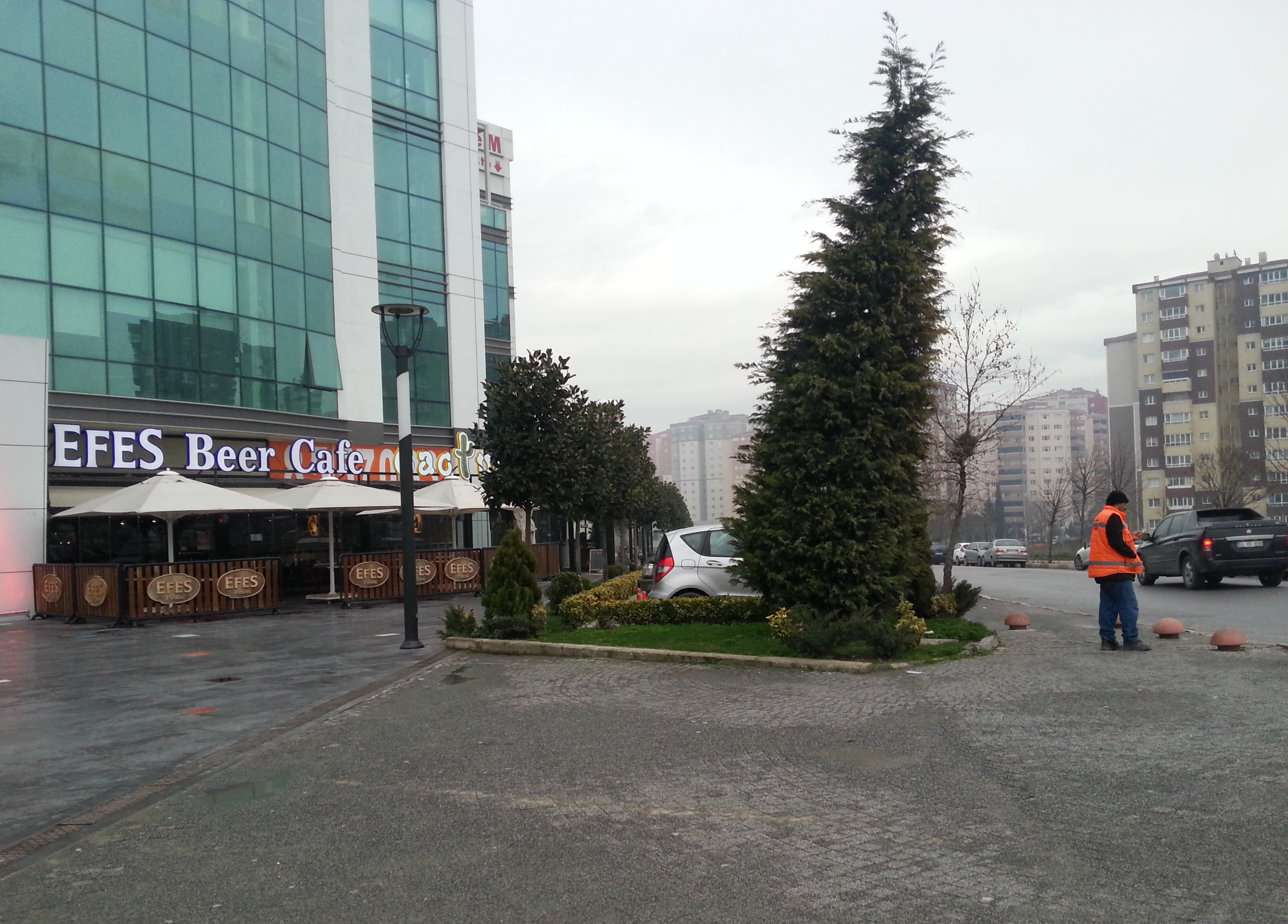
Beykent Perla Vista.
