= Bayan Yanı =

- A 2011 cover about cellulite
- Editor: co-operative
- Categories: Satirical magazine
- Frequency: Monthly
- First issue: March 2011
- Country: Turkey
- Based in: Avcılar near Istanbul
- Language: Turkish

Bayan Yanı is a Turkish language satirical magazine that addresses feminist issues facing Women in Turkey. It is Turkey's only women-led cartoon publication.

== History ==
Bayan Yanı was established in 2011. The magazine was originally intended to be a one-off publication for International Women's Day in 2011. It was started as a supplement to another satirical magazine, Leman.

Later the magazine became popular and it was converted into a monthly magazine. When it started it had a male editor. The magazine was later reported to be created via email without a named editor. The contributors are also known for their work with other Turkish satirical magazines. The magazine is led by Ezgi Aksoy and Feyhan Güver. The staff are mostly female but one of the main contributors is a man. There are twenty staff who wear jeans rather than headscarves. In 2011 the magazine had a circulation of 50,000 and a budget of $30,000. By 2017 they also had 240,000 followers on Facebook.

Bayan Yani translates as "women side by side", referencing a Turkish intercity bus rule that forbids unrelated men and women from sitting together which can resulted in people being denied tickets despite there being empty seats because they were the wrong gender to make a pair. The magazine is not intended to be a women's only magazine, in fact men have requested that the magazine's title should be changed so that they could avoid the embarrassment of buying a women's magazine. Most other magazine's in Turkey exploit women to gain sales. Bayan Yani is said to tackle these issues because these are the ones the contributors experience.

Citing as examples other arrested cartoonists such as Musa Kart, and the detention of many other media workers in Turkey, the contributors have said they know they risk the hazard of arrest in Turkey. In 2026 it was the only women-led cartoon publication in Turkey and its work has been the subject of academic study and it was credited with "reshaping contemporary women’s relationship to digital culture".
