= Great Central Mosque of Avcılar =

Mosque in Avcılar, Turkey

- Avcılar Merkez Ulu Cami
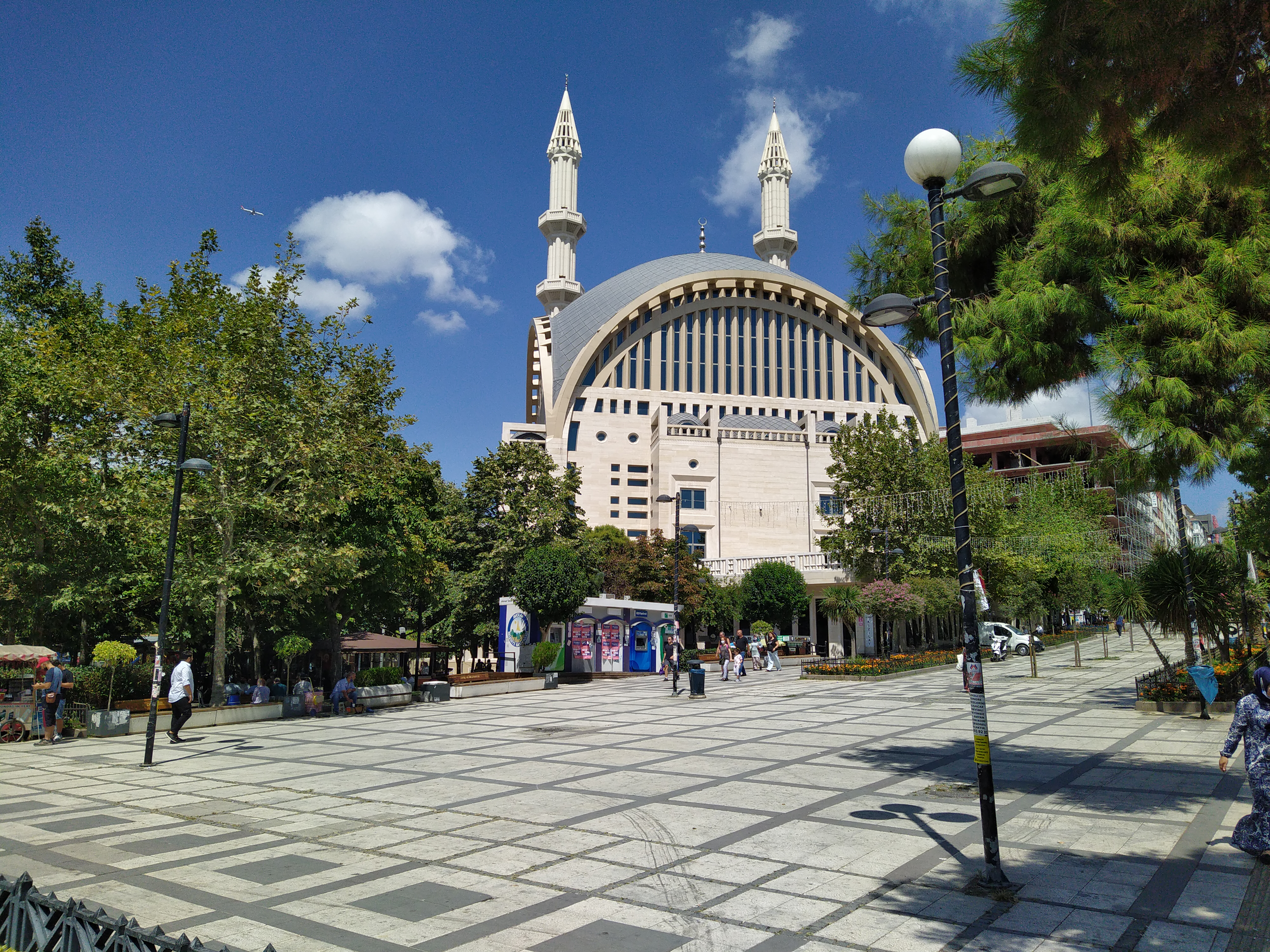

Religion
- Affiliation: Sunni Islam
- Province: Istanbul

Location
- Location: Avcılar
- Country: Turkey
- Interactive map of Great Central Mosque of Avcılar
- Administration: Diyanet
- Coordinates: 40.979839°N 28.7211845°E

Architecture
- Architect: İsmet Osmanoğlu
- Completed: 2019

Specifications
- Capacity: 5650 people
- Interior area: 1,500 square metres (16,000 sq ft)
- Minaret: 2

The Great Central Mosque of Avcılar (Turkish: Avcılar Merkez Ulu Cami) is a mosque in the Turkish municipality of Avcılar, near Istanbul. A mosque previously stood on the same site, but it was closed and demolished in April 2011, and replaced with a new building due to a lack of earthquake-resistant construction.

== History ==
The old Central Mosque was damaged in the 1999 İzmit earthquake. Following investigations by the provincial government and the city administration, it was decided to demolish and rebuild the structure. Construction began in 2013. The basement was opened for the first services in 2014, and the building complex was completed in 2018. In May 2019, the mosque was officially opened by the Mufti of Istanbul, Hasan Kamil Yılmaz, his deputy, Ömer Erden, the Mufti of Avcılar, Bekir Derin, and the former Minister of Health, Mehmet Müezzinoğlu.

== Fittings ==
The mosque offers space for 5,000 worshippers on approximately 1,500 square metres (16,000 sq ft), has a conference room for 500 people and a seminar hall for 150 people. The building was erected by the Avcılar Foundation for Culture, Art and Social Education (AKSEV), and the Istanbul Metropolitan Municipality financed the interior furnishings.
