= Avcılar, Istanbul =

Avcılar
- District and municipality
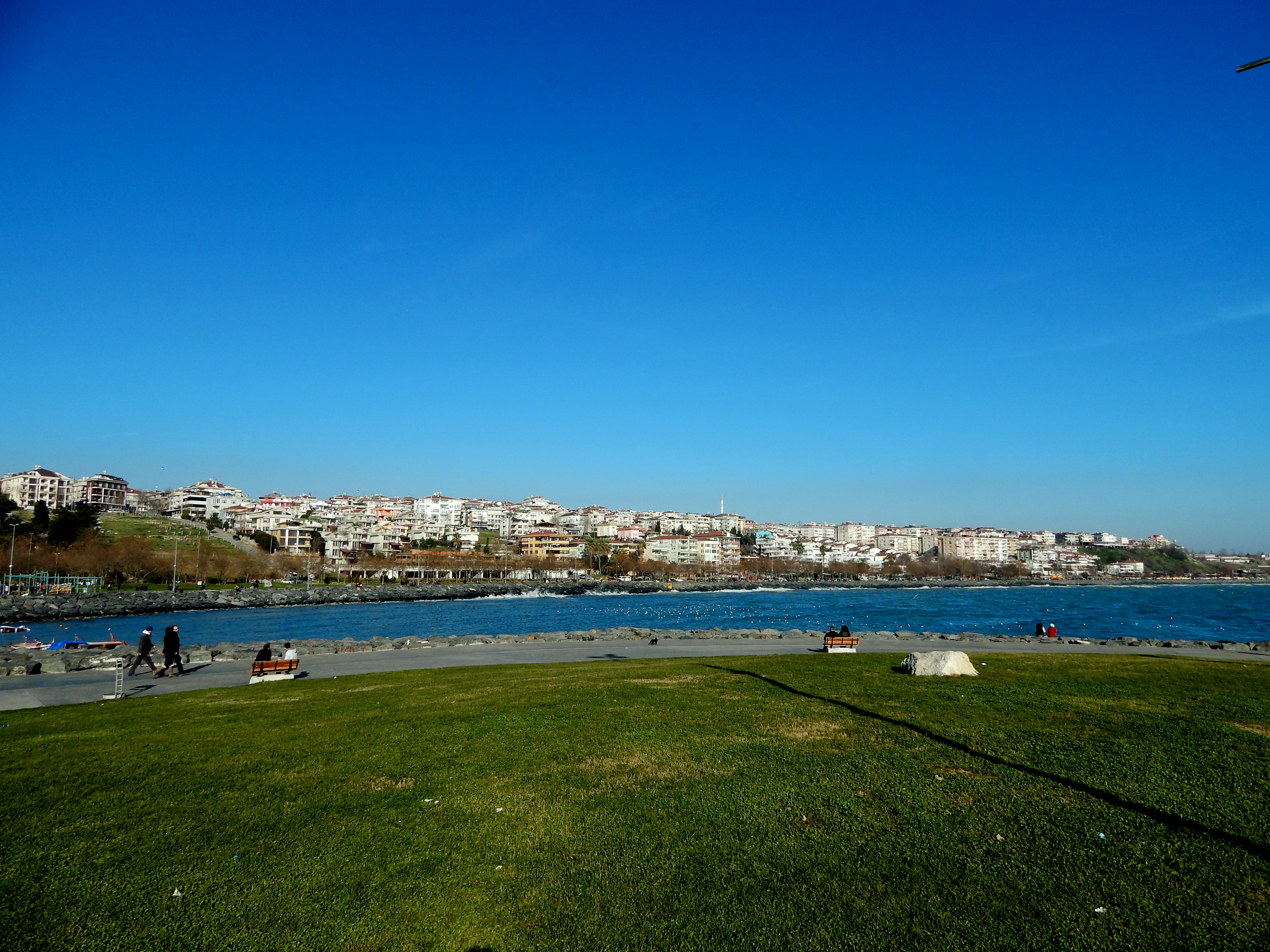
- Avcılar coast

- Logo

- Map showing Avcılar District in Istanbul Province

- Location within Turkey Location within Istanbul
- Coordinates: 40°58′45″N 28°43′17″E
- Country: Turkey
- Province: Istanbul

Government
  - Mayor: Yüksel Can (acting) (CHP)
- Area: 50 km^{2} (19 sq mi)
- Population (2022): 452,132
  - Density: 9,000/km^{2} (23,000/sq mi)
- Time zone: UTC+3 (TRT)
- Area code: 021
- Website: www.avcilar.bel.tr

Avcılar is a municipality and district of Istanbul Province, Turkey. Its area is 50 km^{2}, and its population is 452,132 (2022). It is on the European side of the city, just to the west of the Küçükçekmece inlet of the Sea of Marmara.

== History ==
The Marmara coast road bridges the mouth of the inlet, always an important route in wartime. Therefore, when preparing the conquest of Istanbul the Ottoman forces were keen to populate the Küçükçekmece area with the Turks, the Turkish presence in the area dates from this period.

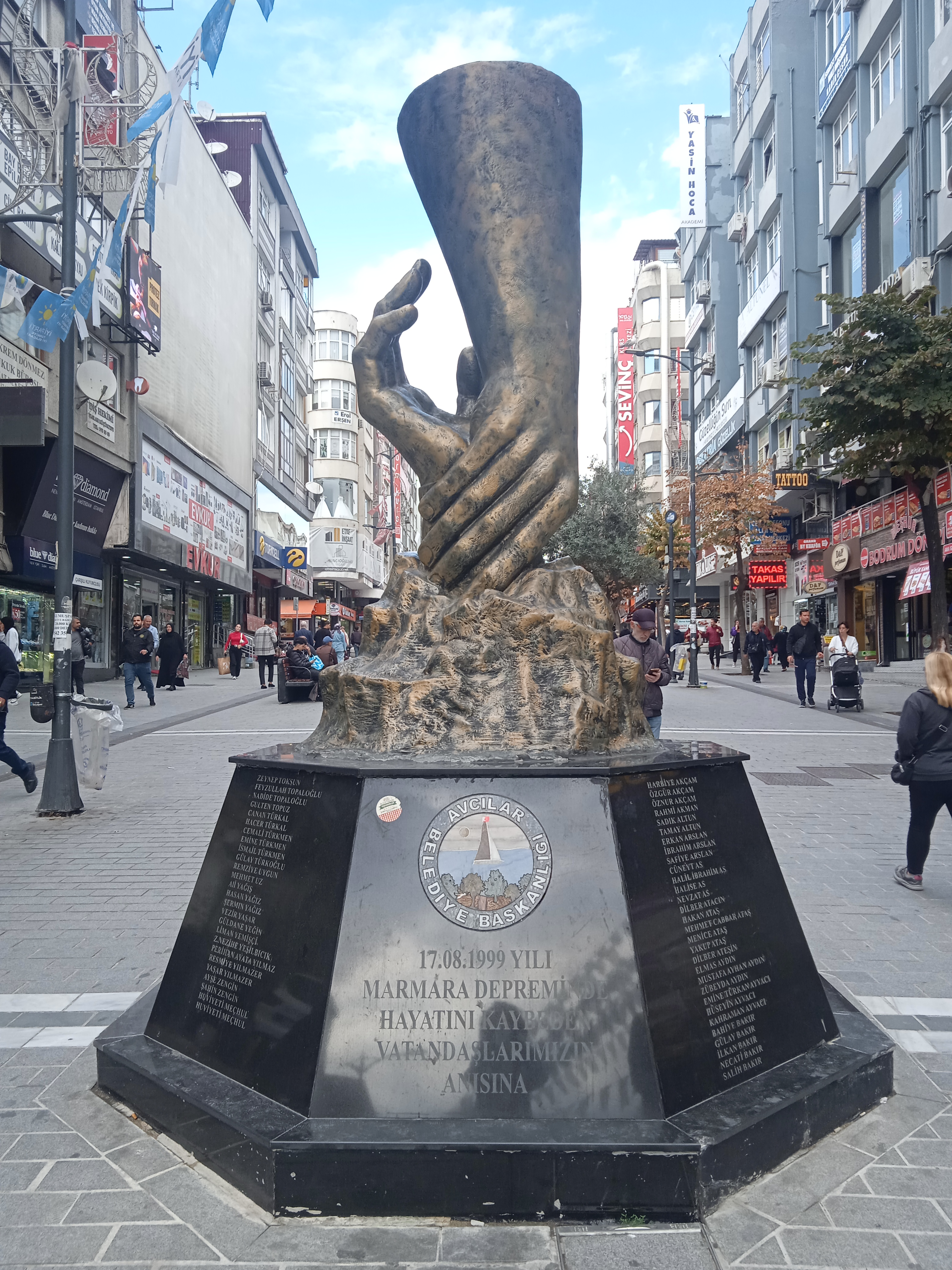
1999 Marmara Earthquake monument located in Avcılar.

The road from Istanbul to Europe has become increasingly important ever since and by the time of the population exchange with Greece at the founding of the Turkish Republic there were 50 Greek families in the village, the property they vacated was then used as a military depot. Little is left of this history; the church had long been converted to a mosque and was pulled down in 1977 for a new mosque to be built; fountains and ruins have disappeared. There is some remaining Ottoman architecture including a hunting lodge belonging to the sultans, (the name Avcılar means 'hunters' in Turkish) because actual hunters used to live in this area to protect the villages and some traditional farmhouses.

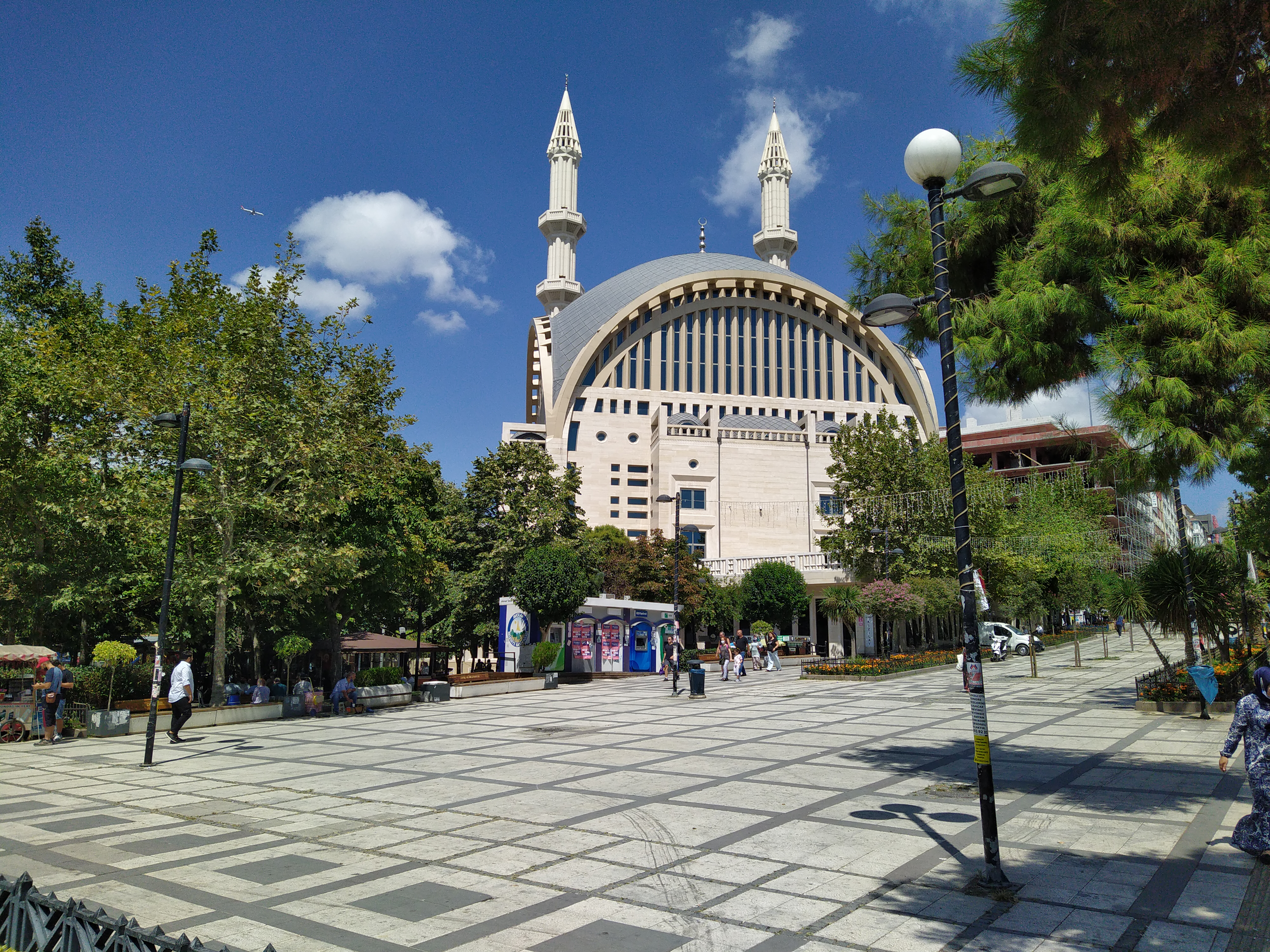
Avcılar center Mosque

== Composition ==
There are 10 neighbourhoods in Avcılar District:

- Ambarlı
- Cihangir
- Denizköşkler
- Firuzköy
- Gümüşpala
- Merkez
- Mustafa Kemal Paşa
- Tahtakale
- Üniversite
- Yeşilkent

== Avcılar today ==
The magazine Bayan Yani is created here and it has had resistance from the authorities. Their offices have been visited by people carrying petrol cans. 150 media workers have been held under arrest in Turkey including the cartoonist Musa Kart who is held in a location near to Avcilar.

== Istanbul University-Cerrahpaşa ==
One of Istanbul University-Cerrahpaşa's campuses is sited in Avcılar, housing the faculties of engineering, business management, sports and veterinary medicine. The campus is far away from the Anatolian Side of Istanbul and transportation was very complicated and difficult before the introduction of the Metrobus system. There is parkland in the campus and around Lake Küçükçekmece.

== Earthquake vulnerability ==
This district was badly hit during Marmara earthquake. A major fault-line follows the Marmara shore and Avcılar is built on low-lying sandy soil, some of its landfill, right on this shore. This and the fact that the buildings are tall and were very cheaply built make it a particularly vulnerable area. The old Central Mosque of Avcılar was damaged and demolished years later; a new building was completed in 2019. Buildings damaged in 1999 have been repaired but an earthquake centered nearer to Istanbul will likely have more severe impacts.
