= Altunizade (Metrobus) =

Bus station in Istanbul, Turkey

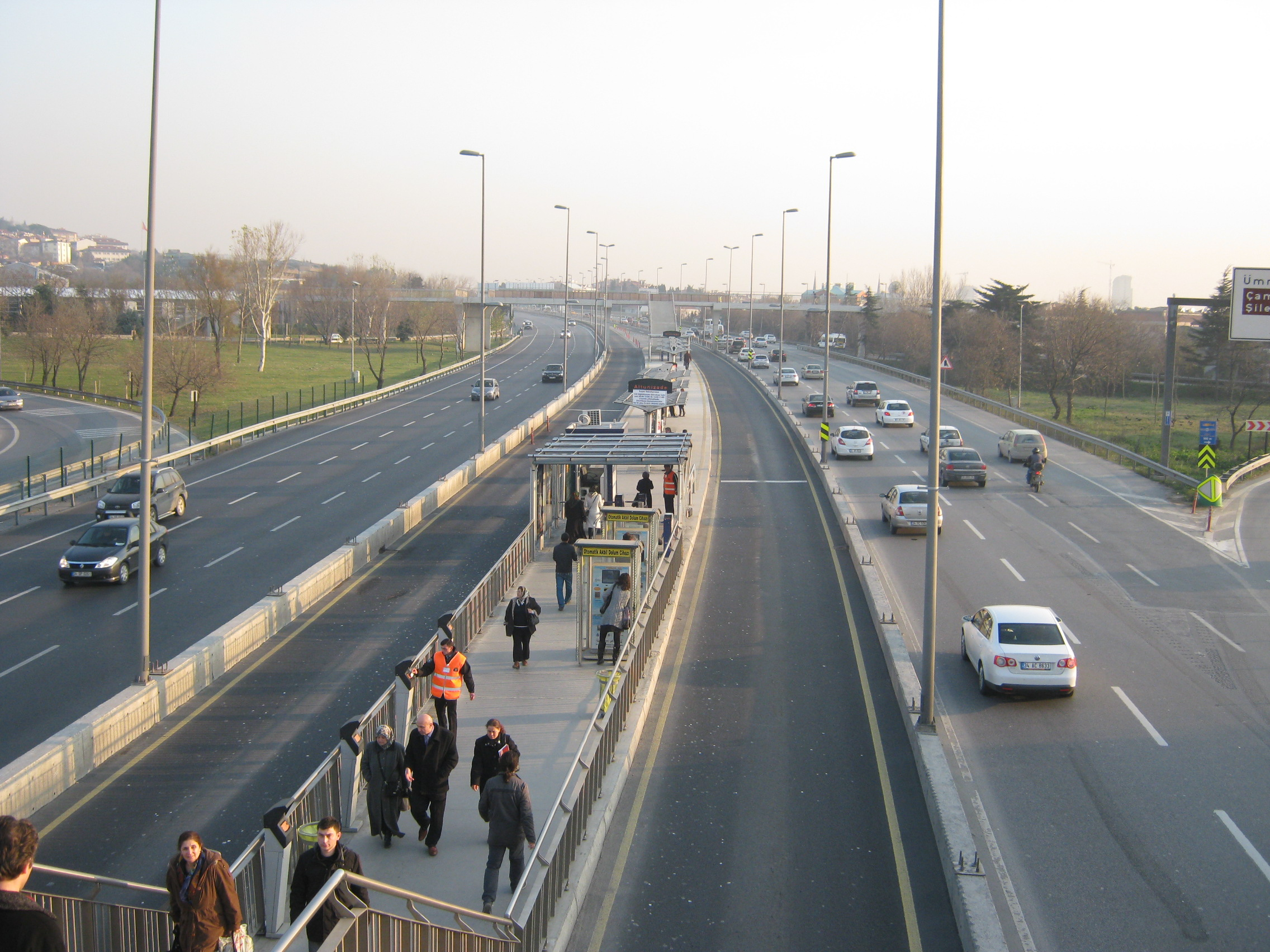

General information
- Location: Altunizade Kav., Hasanpaşa Mah., 34722; Üsküdar
- Coordinates: 41.0216°N 29.0485°E
- System: İETT Bus rapid transit station
- Owner: Istanbul Metropolitan Municipality
- Operator: İETT
- Line: Metrobüs
- Platforms: 1 island platform
- Connections: Istanbul Metro: at Altunizade; İETT Bus: 9, 9A, 9T, 9ÜD, 11, 11A, 11BE, 11C, 11D, 11E, 11K, 11L, 11M, 11N, 11P, 11ST, 11ÜS, 11V, 11Y, 13, 13B, 14, 14D, 14F, 14FD, 14K, 14M, 14R, 14Y, 14YK, 15F, 125, 129T, 139, 139A, 320, MR9; Istanbul Minibus: Üsküdar-Alemdağ・Üsküdar-Tavukçuyolu Cd.-Alemdağ・Üsküdar-Esatpaşa

Other information
- Station code: 5 (IETT)

History
- Opened: 3 March 2009

Services
Preceding station	İETT	Following station
Burhaniye towards Beylikdüzü Sondurak	34G	Acıbadem towards Söğütlüçeşme
Burhaniye towards Avcılar	34AS	Acıbadem towards Söğütlüçeşme
Burhaniye towards Cevizlibağ	34A	Acıbadem towards Söğütlüçeşme
Burhaniye towards Zincirlikuyu	34Z	Acıbadem towards Söğütlüçeşme
Location

Altunizade is a station on the Istanbul Metrobus Bus rapid transit line. It is located on the Istanbul Inner Beltway, within the Altunizade interchange. The station is serviced by four of the seven Metrobus routes.

Altunizade station was opened on 3 March 2009 as part of the eastward expansion of the line across the Bosporus.
