= Acıbadem (Metrobus) =

General information
- Location: Acıbadem Cd., Küçük Çamlıca Mah., 34696; Üsküdar/Istanbul; Turkey
- Coordinates: 41.0146°N 29.0570°E
- System: İETT Bus rapid transit station
- Owner: Istanbul Metropolitan Municipality
- Operator: İETT
- Line: Metrobüs
- Platforms: 1 island platform
- Connections: İETT Bus: 1, 3B, 6, 11ES, 11Ü, 14

Other information
- Station code: 4 (IETT)

History
- Opened: 3 March 2009

Services
Preceding station	İETT	Following station
Altunizade towards Beylikdüzü Sondurak	34G	Uzunçayır towards Söğütlüçeşme
Altunizade towards Avcılar	34AS	Uzunçayır towards Söğütlüçeşme
Altunizade towards Cevizlibağ	34A	Uzunçayır towards Söğütlüçeşme
Altunizade towards Zincirlikuyu	34Z	Uzunçayır towards Söğütlüçeşme
Location

Acıbadem is a station on the Istanbul Metrobus Bus rapid transit line. It is located on the Istanbul Inner Beltway and accessible via Acıbadem Avenue. The station is serviced by four of the seven Metrobus routes.

Acıbadem station was opened on 3 March 2009 as part of the eastward expansion of the line across the Bosporus.
