= Uzunçayır (Metrobus) =

General information
- Location: Çamlıca Kav., Hasanpaşa Mah., 34722; Kadıköy/Istanbul; Turkey
- Coordinates: 40.9988°N 29.0565°E
- System: İETT Bus rapid transit station
- Owner: Istanbul Metropolitan Municipality
- Operator: İETT
- Line: Metrobüs
- Platforms: 1 island platform
- Connections: Istanbul Metro at Ünalan; İETT Bus: 3A, 11T, 13M, 13Y, 14A, 14BK, 14DK, 15BK, 16A, 16, B, 16C, 16F, 16KH, 16M, 16S, 16U, 16Y, 16Z, 17K, 17P, 18A, 18E, 18K, 18M, 18Ü, 18V, 18Y, 19, 19A, 19B, 19E, 19FK, 19H, 19T, 19Z, 20E, 20Ü, 21B, 21C, 21G, 21K, 21U, 130, 130A, 130Ş, 319, 320A, E-10, E-11, Istanbul Minibüs: Harem-Gebze, Kadıköy-Armağanevler, Kadıköy-Atakent, Kadıköy-Batı Ataşehir, Kadıköy-Bulgurlu, Kadıköy-Kartal, Kadıköy-Uğur Mumcu, Kadıköy-Yukarı Dudullu, Kadıköy-Özel Eyüboğlu Koleji, Üsküdar-Ataşehir, Üsküdar-Ferhatpaşa, Üsküdar-Kozyatağı

Other information
- Station code: 3 (IETT)

History
- Opened: 3 March 2009

Services
| Preceding station | İETT | Following station |
|---|---|---|
| Acıbadem towards Beylikdüzü Sondurak | 34G | Fikirtepe towards Söğütlüçeşme |
| Acıbadem towards Avcılar | 34AS | Fikirtepe towards Söğütlüçeşme |
| Acıbadem towards Cevizlibağ | 34A | Fikirtepe towards Söğütlüçeşme |
| Acıbadem towards Zincirlikuyu | 34Z | Fikirtepe towards Söğütlüçeşme |
Location

Uzunçayır is a station on the Istanbul Metrobus Bus rapid transit line. It is located on the Istanbul Inner Beltway, within the Uzunçayır interchange. The station is serviced by four of the seven Metrobus routes. Connection to the M4 line of the Istanbul Metro is available.

Uzunçayır station was opened on 3 March 2009 as part of the eastward expansion of the line across the Bosporus.
