= Burhaniye (Metrobus) =

General information
- Location: Burhaniye Mah., Enveriye Sk., 34676; Üsküdar, Istanbul; Turkey
- Coordinates: 41.031824°N 29.046870°E
- System: İETT Bus rapid transit station
- Owner: Istanbul Metropolitan Municipality
- Operator: İETT
- Line: Metrobüs
- Platforms: 1 island platform
- Connections: İETT Bus: 3, 11BE, 14M, 15F, 15

Other information
- Station code: 6 (IETT)

History
- Opened: 3 March 2009

Services
Preceding station	İETT	Following station
Boğaziçi Köprüsü towards Beylikdüzü Sondurak	34G	Altunizade towards Söğütlüçeşme
Boğaziçi Köprüsü towards Avcılar	34AS	Altunizade towards Söğütlüçeşme
Boğaziçi Köprüsü towards Cevizlibağ	34A	Altunizade towards Söğütlüçeşme
Boğaziçi Köprüsü towards Zincirlikuyu	34Z	Altunizade towards Söğütlüçeşme
Location

Burhaniye is a station on the Istanbul Metrobus Bus rapid transit line. It is located on the Istanbul Inner Beltway and accessible via Burhaniye Abdullahağa Avenue. The station is serviced by four of the seven Metrobus routes.

Burhaniye station was opened on 3 March 2009 as part of the eastward expansion of the line across the Bosporus.
