= M20 (Istanbul Metro) =

Transit line in the largest city of Turkey

M20 (Sefaköy – TÜYAP)

Overview
- Status: Under Construction
- Owner: Istanbul Metropolitan Municipality
- Line number: M20
- Locale: Istanbul, Turkey
- Termini: Sefaköy; TÜYAP
- Stations: 10

Service
- Type: Rapid transit
- System: Istanbul Metro
- Operator: Metro Istanbul
- Depot: TÜYAP

History
- Planned opening: 9 September 2027

Technical
- Line length: 18.51 km (11.50 mi)
- Number of tracks: 2
- Track gauge: 1,435 mm (4 ft 8 1/2 in) standard gauge

The M20, officially referred to as the M20 Sefaköy–TÜYAP Metro Line is a planned rapid transit line in Istanbul.

The line was originally conceived as an extension to the M2 line but was later made into its own lines due to conflict between the opposition-controlled Istanbul Metropolitan Municipality and the government-controlled Ministry of Transport and Infrastructure and was later given the line code M20 on the vision map.

== History ==
The line will be crucial for the districts it passes through with a total population of 3.5 million people, who currently have no alternative other than the Metrobus. Works on the line have not started yet, the plans and projects prepared by Istanbul Metropolitan Municipality (IMM) were not approved by the General Directorate of the Infrastructural Investment (AYGM) for a period spanning more than a year. As a result of long discussions, the environmental impact assessment report process started on August 5, 2022. In a statement made by the Mayor of Istanbul, Ekrem İmamoğlu, he announced that the AYGM approval had been received and that the project had been sent for approval to the treasury. Later on, the line received approval from the treasury and the project was sent to the signature of the President of Turkey.

In January 2026, the Turkish Presidency didn't give approval to start the construction for the eighth time, even though all planning for the project was complete. The common view among the public on why the Presidency denies a signature from the project is the political polarization in Turkey. In recent years, Istanbul at large and the districts that the metro line surpasses tended to vote for the main opposition party, instead of President Erdoğan and his political party. Also, Erdoğan views Mayor İmamoğlu as an opponent in the next presidential election, and by delaying the construction, he seeks to prevent a political victory for İmamoğlu.

== Stations ==
No	Station	District	Transfer	Type	Notes
1	Sefaköy	Küçükçekmece	・ (Sefaköy); İETT Bus: 36AS, 73B, 73F, 73H, 76, 76C, 76O, 76V, 79Y, 89, 89A, 89B, 89BS, 89F, 89K, 89S, 98, 98AB, 98KM, 98S, 98TB, 146, AVR1A, HS3, HT20, KÇ2, MR42	Underground	
2	Cennet	Küçükçekmece	İETT Bus: 76, 76C, 76O, 89F, 146	Underground	
3	Küçükçekmece	Küçükçekmece	(Küçükçekmece)・ (Küçükçekmece); İETT Bus: 76, 76C, 76D, 76O, 89F, 145, 146, MK16, BN1	Underground	
4	Reşitpaşa	Avcılar	İETT Bus: 76, 76C, 76O, 145, 146	Underground	
5	Avcılar Merkez	Avcılar	(Avcılar Merkez); İETT Bus: 76, 76B, 76BA, 76C, 76D, 76G, 76O, 142, 142A, 142ES, 142F, 142K, 144A, 145, 146, 303A, 401, 429A, 458, BM4, HS2, HT29, HT48	Underground	Istanbul University-Cerrahpaşa
6	Cihangir	Avcılar	(Cihangir Universitesi); İETT Bus: 76, 76BA, 76C, 76G, 76TM, 76Y, 145, 146, 147, 303A, 401, 429A, 458, BM4, HT29, HT48	Underground	
7	Saadetdere	Avcılar	İETT Bus: 76, 76BA, 76C, 76G, 145, 303A, 401, 429A, 458, BM4, HT29, HT48	Underground	
8	Beylikdüzü	Beylikdüzü	・ (Beylikdüzü); İETT Bus: 76, 76BA, 76C, 76G, 76TM, 144, 144H, 145, 303A, 400A, 401, 401T, 418, 429A, 448, 458, BM5, ES1, HT29, HT48	Underground	Beylikdüzü Square・Marmara Park
9	Yıldırım Beyazıt	Beylikdüzü	(Cumhuriyet Mahallesi); İETT Bus: 76BA, 76C, 76G, 76TM, 142B, 142T, 144, 144H, 303A, 400A, 401, 401T, 418, 429A, 448, BM6, BM7, ES1, ES3, HT48	Underground	
10	TÜYAP	Büyükçekmece	(Beylikdüzü Sondurak); İETT Bus: 76TM, 142B, 142T, 300, 300B, 300C, 300D, 300G, 300M, 300S, 303A, 401, 401T, 448, HT19, HT48	Underground	TÜYAP Fair and Congress Center

== See also ==
- Istanbul Metro
- Public transport in Istanbul
