= Haramidere (Metrobus) =

General information
- Location: Güzelyurt Mah., D100, 34515; Esenyurt/Istanbul; Turkey
- Coordinates: 41.006045°N 28.673081°E
- System: İETT Bus rapid transit station
- Owner: Istanbul Metropolitan Municipality
- Operator: İETT
- Line: Metrobüs
- Platforms: 1 island platform
- Connections: İETT Bus: 76, 76BA, 76C, 76G, 76TM, 144H, 145T, 303A, 400A, 401, 401T, 418, 429, 429A, 448, 458, BM4, ES1, ES3, HT18, HT29, HT48

Other information
- Station code: 38 (IETT)

History
- Opened: 19 July 2012

Services
Preceding station	İETT	Following station
Güzelyurt towards Beylikdüzü Sondurak	34C	Haramidere Sanayi towards Cevizlibağ
Güzelyurt towards Beylikdüzü Sondurak	34BZ	Haramidere Sanayi towards Zincirlikuyu
Güzelyurt towards Beylikdüzü Sondurak	34G	Haramidere Sanayi towards Söğütlüçeşme
Location

Haramidere is a station on the Istanbul Metrobus Bus rapid transit line. It is located on the D.100 state highway, with entrances/exits on both sides of the road.

Haramidere station was opened on 19 July 2012 as part of the westward expansion of the line.
