= Çağlayan (Metrobus) =

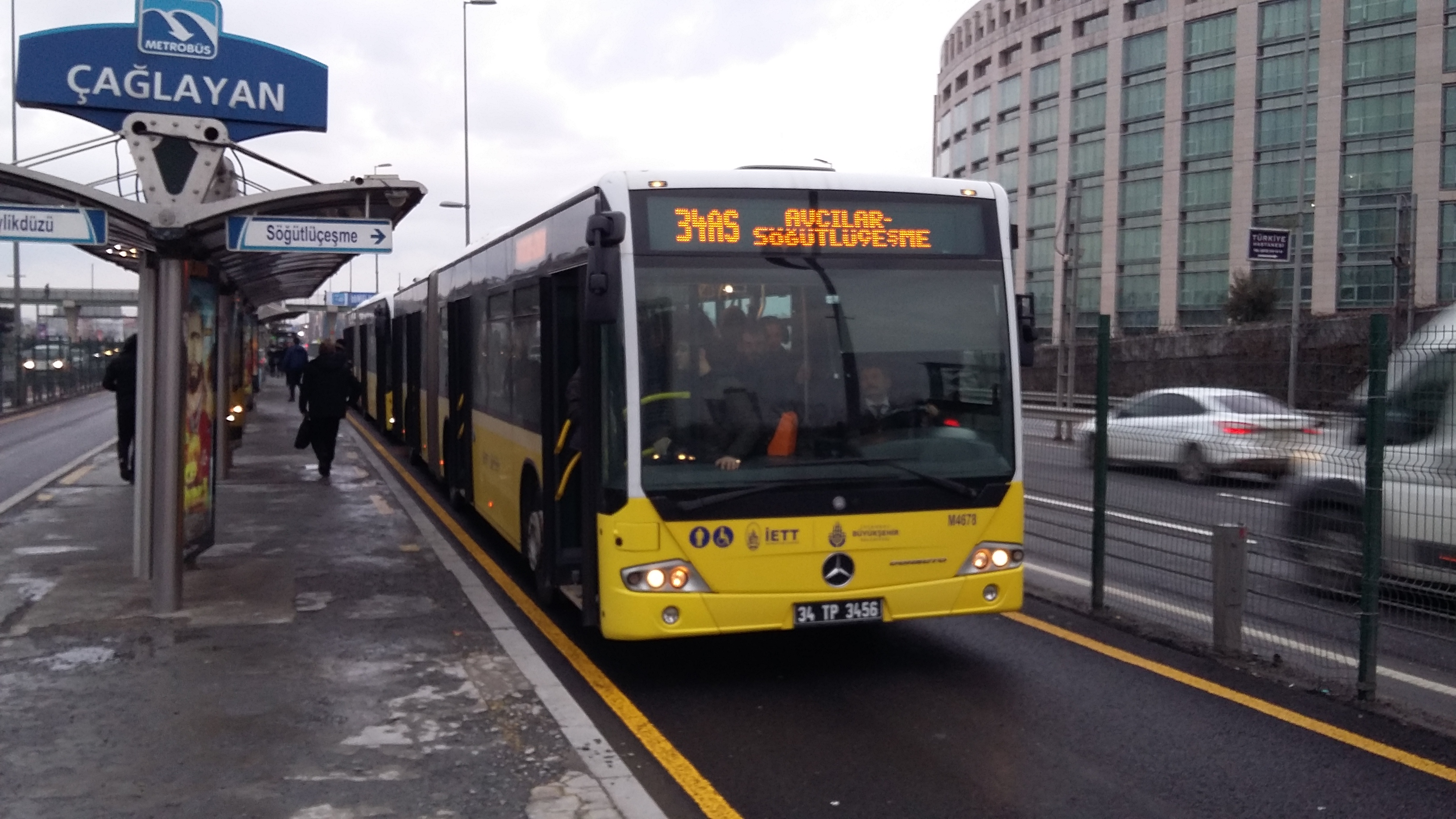
- Çağlayan station.

General information
- Location: İstanbul Çevre Yolu, Merkez Mah., 34381; Şişli/Istanbul; Turkey
- Coordinates: 41.0673°N 28.9802°E
- System: İETT Bus rapid transit station
- Owner: Istanbul Metropolitan Municipality
- Operator: İETT
- Line: Metrobüs
- Platforms: 1 island platforms
- Connections: İETT Bus:32M, 33M, 33TM, 46Ç, 46E, 46H, 46T, 48, 48H, 48N, 48S, 50C, 65A, 77A, 79KM, 92M, 92Ş, 97M, 141M, 146M, 336M, E-58, H2, K4; Istanbul Minibus: Şişhane-Şişli, Şişli-Başak Konutları, Şişli-Göktürk, Şişli-Güzeltepe, Şişli-Zincirdere

Other information
- Station code: 10 (IETT)

History
- Opened: 8 September 2008

Services
Preceding station	İETT	Following station
Okmeydanı Hastane towards Avcılar	34	Mecidiyeköy towards Zincirlikuyu
Okmeydanı Hastane towards Beylikdüzü Sondurak	34BZ	Mecidiyeköy towards Zincirlikuyu
Okmeydanı Hastane towards Beylikdüzü Sondurak	34G	Mecidiyeköy towards Söğütlüçeşme
Okmeydanı Hastane towards Avcılar	34AS	Mecidiyeköy towards Söğütlüçeşme
Okmeydanı Hastane towards Cevizlibağ	34A	Mecidiyeköy towards Söğütlüçeşme
Location

Çağlayan is a station on the Istanbul Metrobus Bus rapid transit line. It is located on the Istanbul Inner Beltway in Şişli, Istanbul, adjacent to the Istanbul Justice Palace. The station is serviced by five of the seven metrobus routes

The station was opened on 8 September 2008 as part of the ten station eastward expansion of the line.
