= Fikirtepe (Metrobus) =

General information
- Location: Yıldırım Sk.-Özbey Cd., Fikirtepe Mah., 34720; Kadıköy/Istanbul; Turkey
- Coordinates: 40.9936°N 29.0471°E
- System: İETT Bus rapid transit station
- Owner: Istanbul Metropolitan Municipality
- Operator: İETT
- Line: Metrobüs
- Platforms: 1 island platform
- Connections: İETT Bus: 8A

Other information
- Station code: 2 (IETT)

History
- Opened: 3 March 2009

Services
Preceding station	İETT	Following station
Uzunçayır towards Beylikdüzü Sondurak	34G	Söğütlüçeşme Terminus
Uzunçayır towards Avcılar	34AS	Söğütlüçeşme Terminus
Uzunçayır towards Cevizlibağ	34A	Söğütlüçeşme Terminus
Uzunçayır towards Zincirlikuyu	34Z	Söğütlüçeşme Terminus
Location

Fikirtepe is a station on the Istanbul Metrobus Bus rapid transit line. It is located on the Istanbul Inner Beltway, with entrances on Yıldırım Street and Özbey Avenue. The station is serviced by four of the seven Metrobus routes.

Fikirtepe station was opened on 3 March 2009 as part of the eastward expansion of the line across the Bosporus.
