= Boğaziçi Köprüsü (Metrobus) =

General information
- Location: Beylerbeyi Mah., 34676; Üsküdar, Istanbul; Turkey
- Coordinates: 41.036513°N 29.043182°E
- System: İETT Bus rapid transit station
- Owner: Istanbul Metropolitan Municipality
- Operator: İETT
- Line: Metrobüs
- Platforms: 2 island platforms
- Connections: İETT Bus: 129T, 251, 252, 256, 522

Other information
- Station code: 7 (IETT)

History
- Opened: 3 March 2009

Services
Preceding station	İETT	Following station
Zincirlikuyu towards Beylikdüzü Sondurak	34G	Burhaniye towards Söğütlüçeşme
Zincirlikuyu towards Avcılar	34AS	Burhaniye towards Söğütlüçeşme
Zincirlikuyu towards Cevizlibağ	34A	Burhaniye towards Söğütlüçeşme
Zincirlikuyu Terminus	34Z	Burhaniye towards Söğütlüçeşme
Location

Boğaziçi Köprüsü is a station on the Istanbul Metrobus Bus rapid transit line. It is located on the Istanbul Inner Beltway and accessible via Abdullahağa Avenue. The station is serviced by four of the seven Metrobus routes.

Boğaziçi Köprüsü station was opened on 3 March 2009 as part of the eastward expansion of the line across the Bosporus.
