= İncirli (Metrobus) =

Bus station in Istanbul

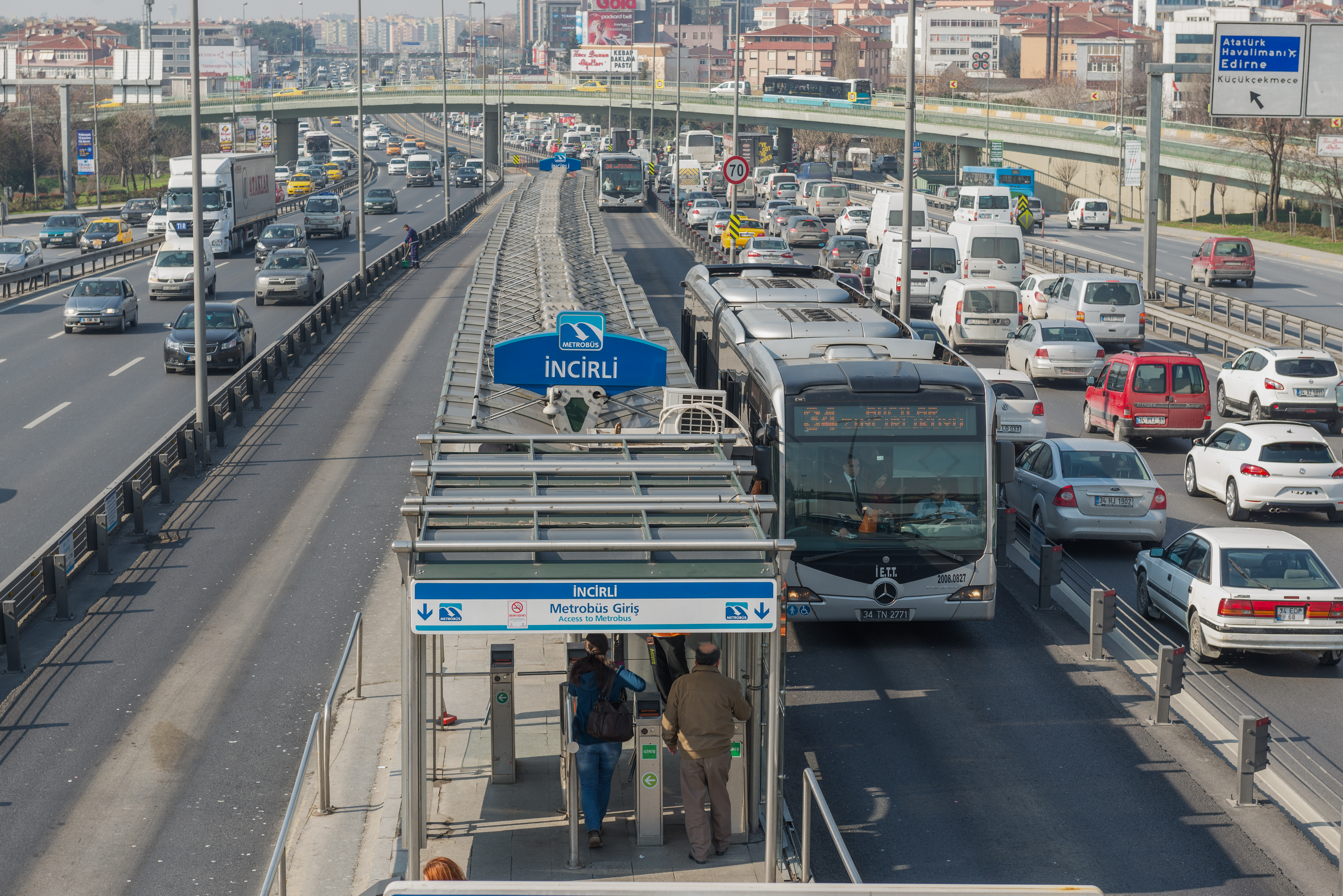
- İncirli station.

General information
- Location: D.100, Bahçelievler Mah., 34515; Bahçelievler/Istanbul; Turkey
- Coordinates: 40.9979°N 28.8728°E
- System: İETT Bus rapid transit station
- Owner: Istanbul Metropolitan Municipality
- Operator: İETT
- Line: Metrobüs
- Platforms: 1 island platform
- Connections: Istanbul Metro at Bakırköy—İncirli; İETT Bus: 31, 31E, 50B, 71T, 72T, 73, 73F, 76D, 78ZB, 79G, 79Ş, 82, 89, 89A, 89B, 89K, 89M, 89S, 92, 97, 97A, 97BT, 97E, 97KZ, 97T, H-9, HT13, MK97; Istanbul Minibus: Bakırköy-Topkapı, Bakırköy Metro-Kocasinan, Bakırköy Metro-Basın Tesisleri, Bakırköy Metro-Barbaros Mahallesi, Bakırköy Metro-Yenibosna Metro, Bakırköy Metro-Yenimahalle, Bakırköy Metro-İstoç

Other information
- Station code: 22 (IETT)

History
- Opened: 17 September 2007

Services
Preceding station	İETT	Following station
Bahçelievler towards Avcılar	34	Zeytinburnu towards Zincirlikuyu
Bahçelievler towards Beylikdüzü Sondurak	34BZ	Zeytinburnu towards Zincirlikuyu
Bahçelievler towards Beylikdüzü Sondurak	34G	Zeytinburnu towards Söğütlüçeşme
Bahçelievler towards Avcılar	34AS	Zeytinburnu towards Söğütlüçeşme
Bahçelievler towards Beylikdüzü Sondurak	34C	Zeytinburnu towards Cevizlibağ
Location

İncirli is a station on the Istanbul Metrobus Bus rapid transit line. It is located on the D.100 state highway, with the entrances/exits on both sides of the road.

İncirli station was opened on 17 September 2007 as part of the original metrobus line.
