= Beykent (Metrobus) =

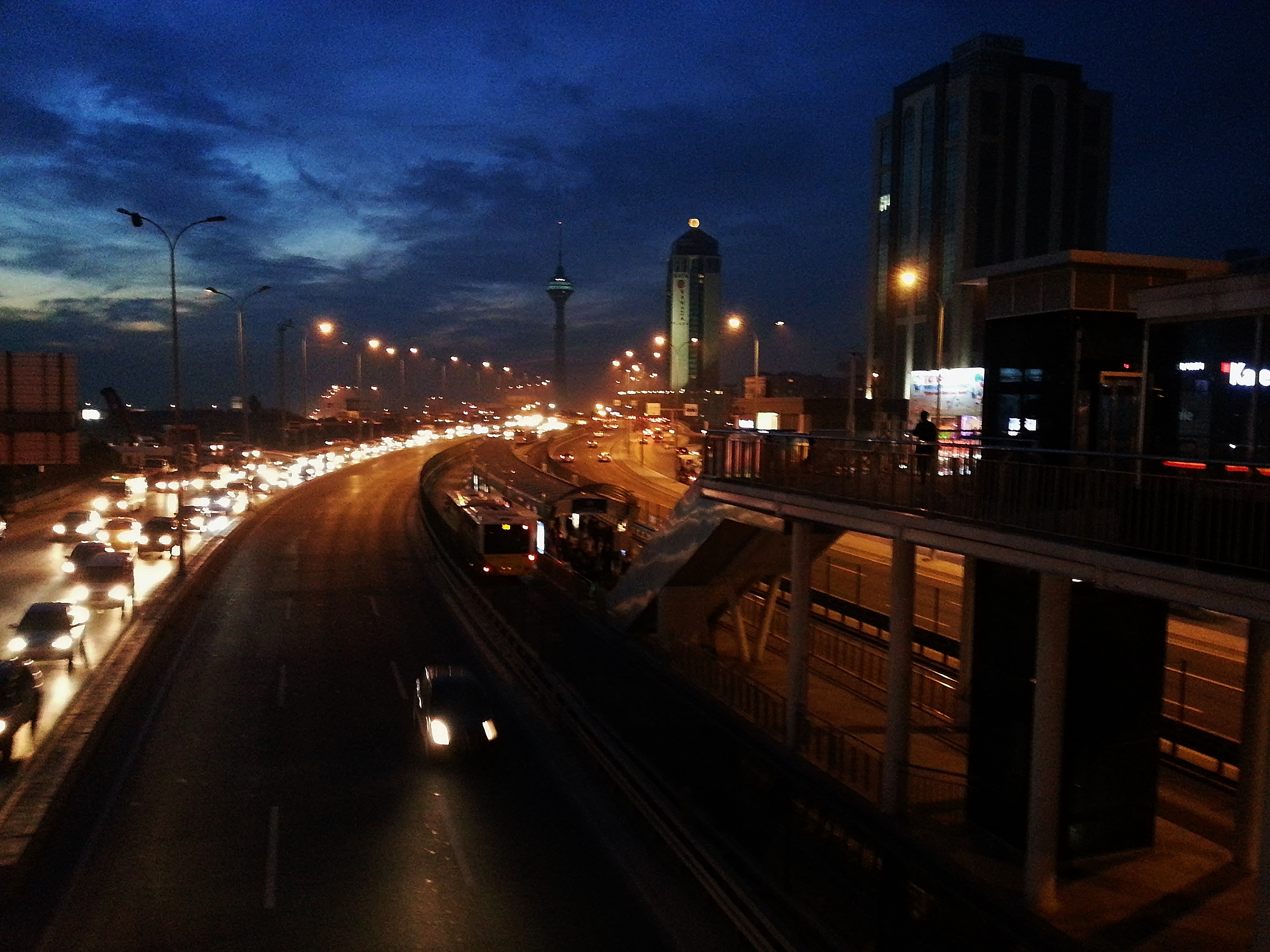
- Looking west from the station overpass.

General information
- Location: D.100, Cumhuriyet Mah., 34522; Beylikdüzü/Istanbul; Turkey
- Coordinates: 41.0192°N 28.6315°E
- System: İETT Bus rapid transit station
- Owner: Istanbul Metropolitan Municipality
- Operator: İETT
- Line: Metrobüs
- Platforms: 1 island platform
- Connections: İETT Bus: 76BA, 76C, 76G, 76TM, 142T, 145M, 303, 400A, 401T, 41; Istanbul Minibus: Büyükçekmece-Beykent Carrefour

Other information
- Station code: 43 (IETT)

History
- Opened: 19 July 2012

Services
| Preceding station | İETT | Following station |
|---|---|---|
| Beylikdüzü Sondurak Terminus | 34C | Cumhuriyet Mahallesi towards Cevizlibağ |
| Beylikdüzü Sondurak Terminus | 34BZ | Cumhuriyet Mahallesi towards Zincirlikuyu |
| Beylikdüzü Sondurak Terminus | 34G | Cumhuriyet Mahallesi towards Söğütlüçeşme |
Location

Beykent is a station on the Istanbul Metrobus Bus rapid transit line. It is located on the D.100 state highway, with entrances/exits on both sides of the road. It was previously named Hadımköy.

Beykent station was opened on 19 July 2012 as part of the westward expansion of the line.
