= Cumhuriyet Mahallesi (Metrobus) =

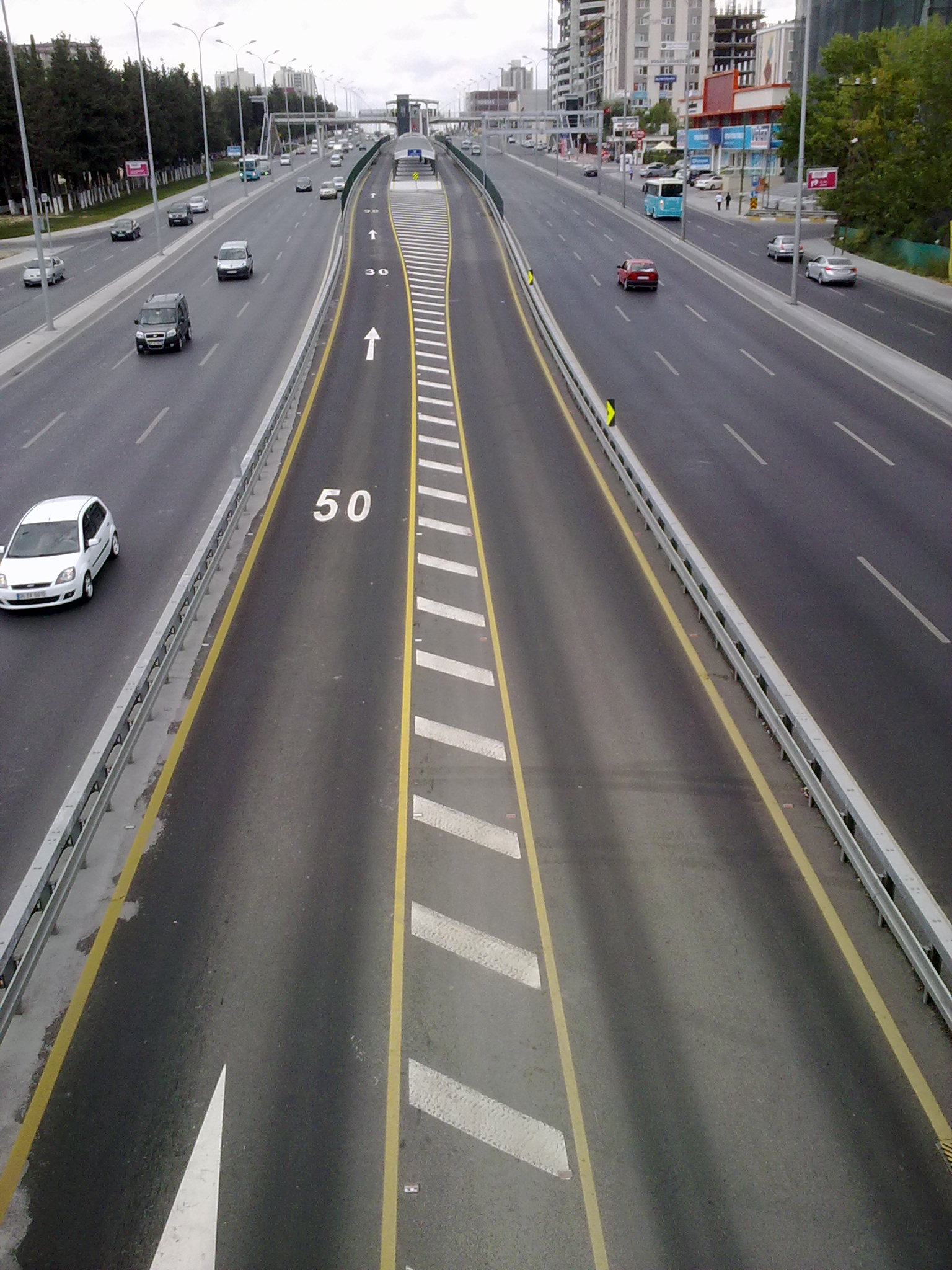

General information
- Location: Cumhuriyet Mah., E-5 Yanyolu, 34520; Beylikdüzü/Istanbul; Turkey
- Coordinates: 41.015722°N 28.640694°E
- System: İETT Bus rapid transit station
- Owner: Istanbul Metropolitan Municipality
- Operator: İETT
- Line: Metrobüs
- Platforms: 1 island platform
- Connections: İETT Bus: 76BA, 76C, 76G, 76TM, 142B, 142T, 144H, 303A, 400A, 401, 401T, 418, 429, 429A, 448, ES1, ES3, HT18, HT48

Other information
- Station code: 42 (IETT)

History
- Opened: 19 July 2012

Services
| Preceding station | İETT | Following station |
|---|---|---|
| Hadımköy towards Beylikdüzü Sondurak | 34C | Beylikdüzü Belediye towards Cevizlibağ |
| Hadımköy towards Beylikdüzü Sondurak | 34BZ | Beylikdüzü Belediye towards Zincirlikuyu |
| Hadımköy towards Beylikdüzü Sondurak | 34G | Beylikdüzü Belediye towards Söğütlüçeşme |
Location

Cumhuriyet Mahallesi is a station on the Istanbul Metrobus Bus rapid transit line. It is located on the D.100 state highway, with entrances/exits on both sides of the road.

Cumhuriyet Mahallesi station was opened on 19 July 2012 as part of the westward expansion of the line.
