= Mecidiyeköy (Metrobus) =

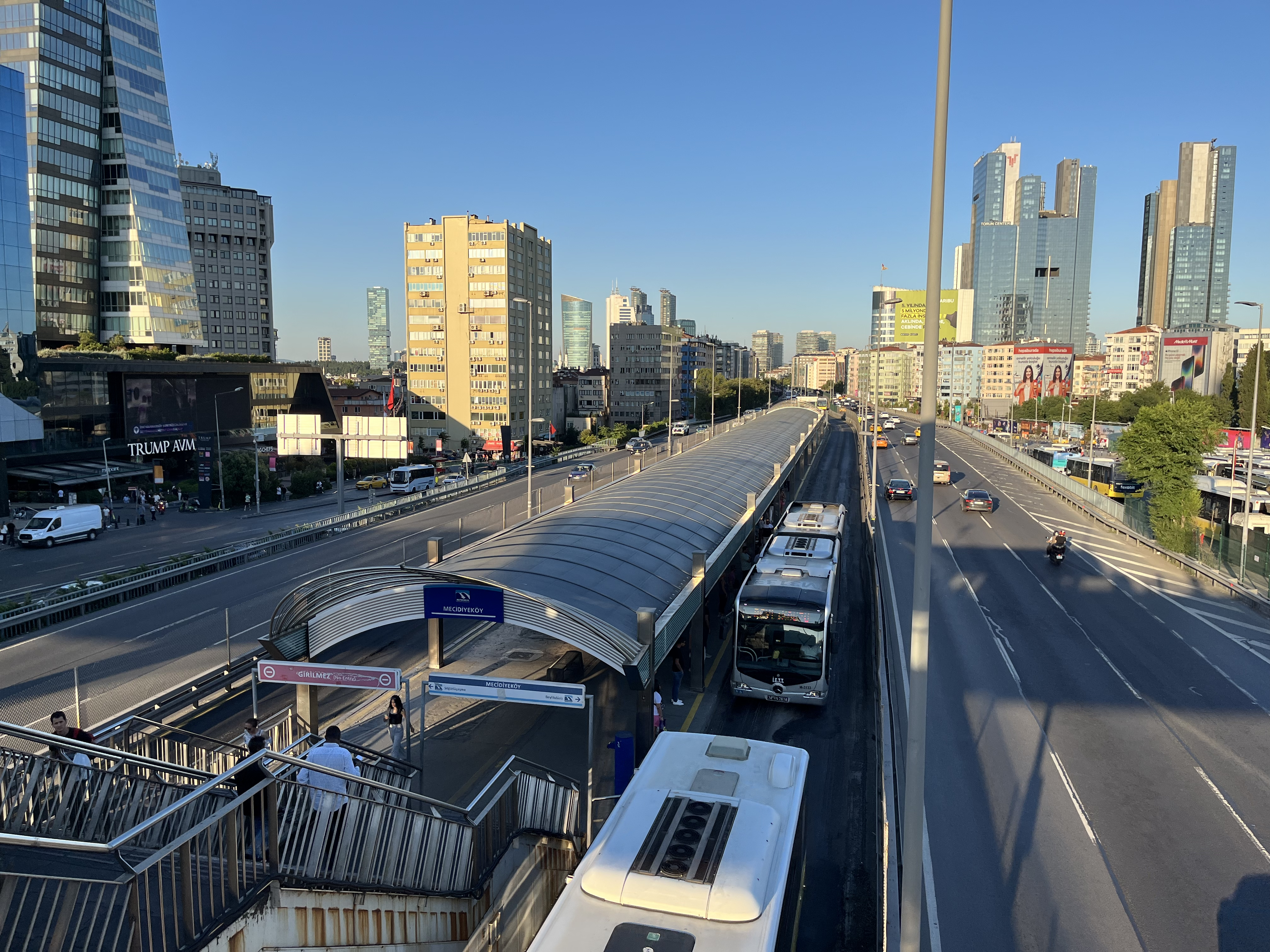
- Mecidiyeköy station with the Trump Towers in the background to the left.

General information
- Location: Mecidiyeköy Cd., Kuştepe Mah., 34387; Şişli/Istanbul; Turkey
- Coordinates: 41.0669°N 28.9912°E
- System: İETT Bus rapid transit station
- Owner: Istanbul Metropolitan Municipality
- Operator: İETT
- Line: Metrobüs
- Platforms: 1 island platforms
- Connections: Istanbul Metro at Şişli—Mecidiyeköy; İETT Bus: 25G, 27T, 29Ş, 30A, 30M, 32M, 33M, 33TM, 36M, 41AT, 46Ç, 46KT, 46T, 48, 48H, 48N, 48S, 50C, 50M, 50S, 54Ç, 54E, 54HŞ, 54K, 54ÖR, 54P, 54T, 55, 59A, 59B, 59CH, 59K, 59N, 59R, 59S, 59UÇ, 64Ç, 65G, 66, 66Z, 74, 74A, 77, 77A, 79KM, 92M, 92Ş, 93M, 97M, 121A, 121B, 121BS, 122B, 122C, 122D, 122M, 122Y, 141A, 141M, 146M, 202, 251, 252, 256, 336M, 522, 522ST, 622, DT1, DT2, E-58, H2, HM3, HM4, K4; Istanbul Minibüs Şişhane-Şişli, Şişli-Başak Konutları, Şişli-Göktürk, Şişli-Güzeltepe, Şişli-İmar Blokları, Şişli-Vialand, Şişli-Yahya Kemal, Şişli-Yunus Emre Mah., Şişli-Zincirdere

Other information
- Station code: 9 (IETT)

History
- Opened: 8 September 2008

Services
Preceding station	İETT	Following station
Çağlayan towards Avcılar	34	Zincirlikuyu Terminus
Çağlayan towards Beylikdüzü Sondurak	34BZ	Zincirlikuyu Terminus
Çağlayan towards Beylikdüzü Sondurak	34G	Zincirlikuyu towards Söğütlüçeşme
Çağlayan towards Avcılar	34AS	Zincirlikuyu towards Söğütlüçeşme
Çağlayan towards Cevizlibağ	34A	Zincirlikuyu towards Söğütlüçeşme
Location

Mecidiyeköy is a station on the Istanbul Metrobus Bus rapid transit line. It is located on the Istanbul Inner Beltway just west of Mecidiyeköy Square. The station is serviced by five of the seven metrobus routes A connection to the M2 of the Istanbul Metro is available as well as several city bus lines.

The station was opened on 8 September 2008 as part of the ten station eastward expansion of the line.
