= Mecidiyeköy =

Neighborhood in Istanbul, Turkey

- Neighbourhood
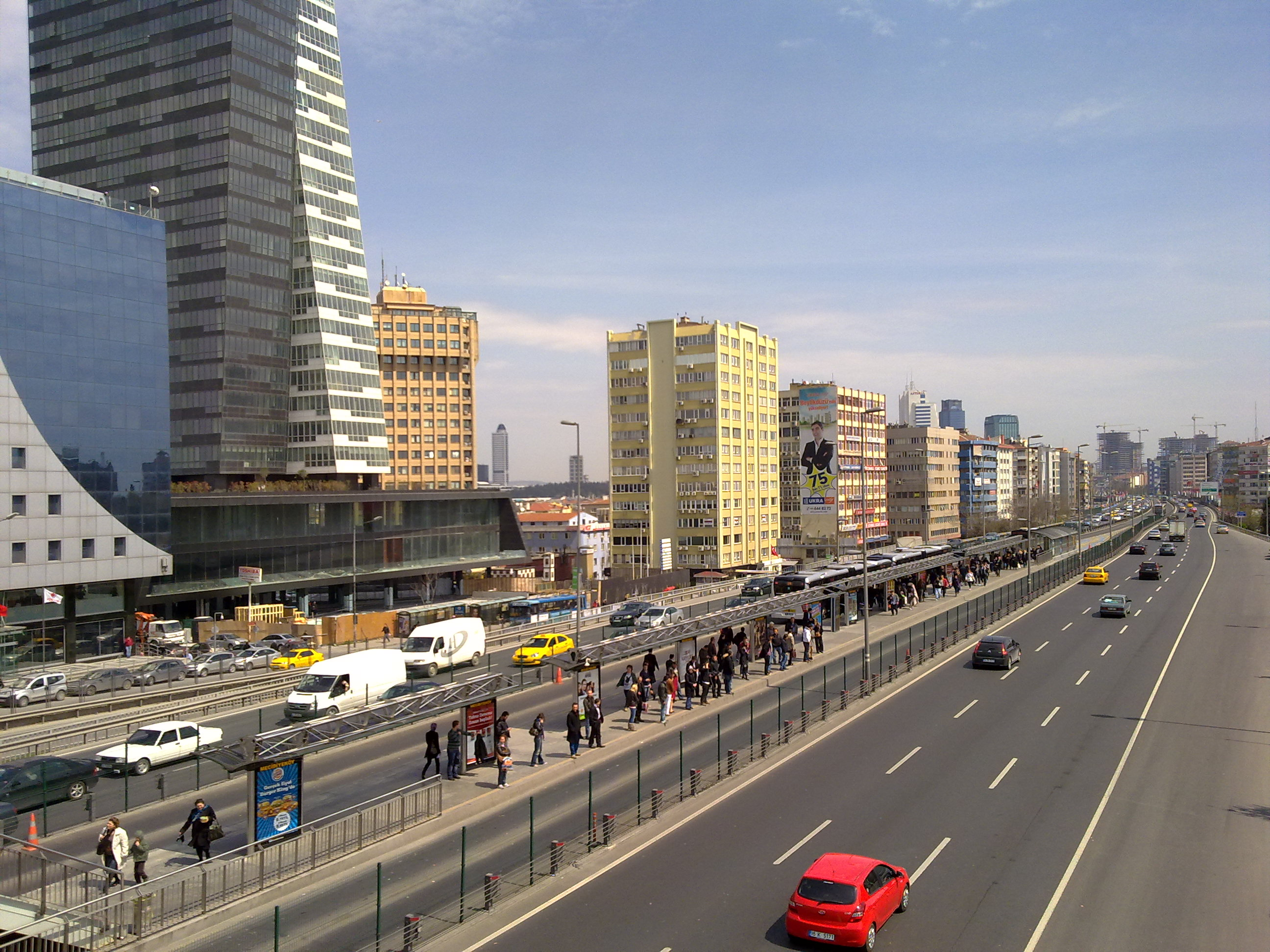
- Mecidiyeköy Metrobus station and Mecidiyeköy panorama

- Location within Turkey Location within Istanbul
- Coordinates: 41°04′N 29°00′E
- Country: Turkey
- Province: Istanbul
- District: Şişli
- Population (2022): 20,006
- Time zone: UTC+3 (TRT)

Mecidiyeköy (Turkish pronunciation: [meˈd͡ʒiːdijecøj] is a neighbourhood in the municipality and district of Şişli, Istanbul Province, Turkey. Its population is 20,006 (2022). It is a heavily built-up residential and business neighbourhood, squeezed in between the Fulya, Kuştepe, Gültepe, Esentepe, and Gülbahar neighbourhoods.

Mecidiyeköy means "Mecid's Village" in Turkish, a name it acquired because it was during the reign of the Ottoman sultan Abdülmecid I that it started to be settled.

== Attractions ==
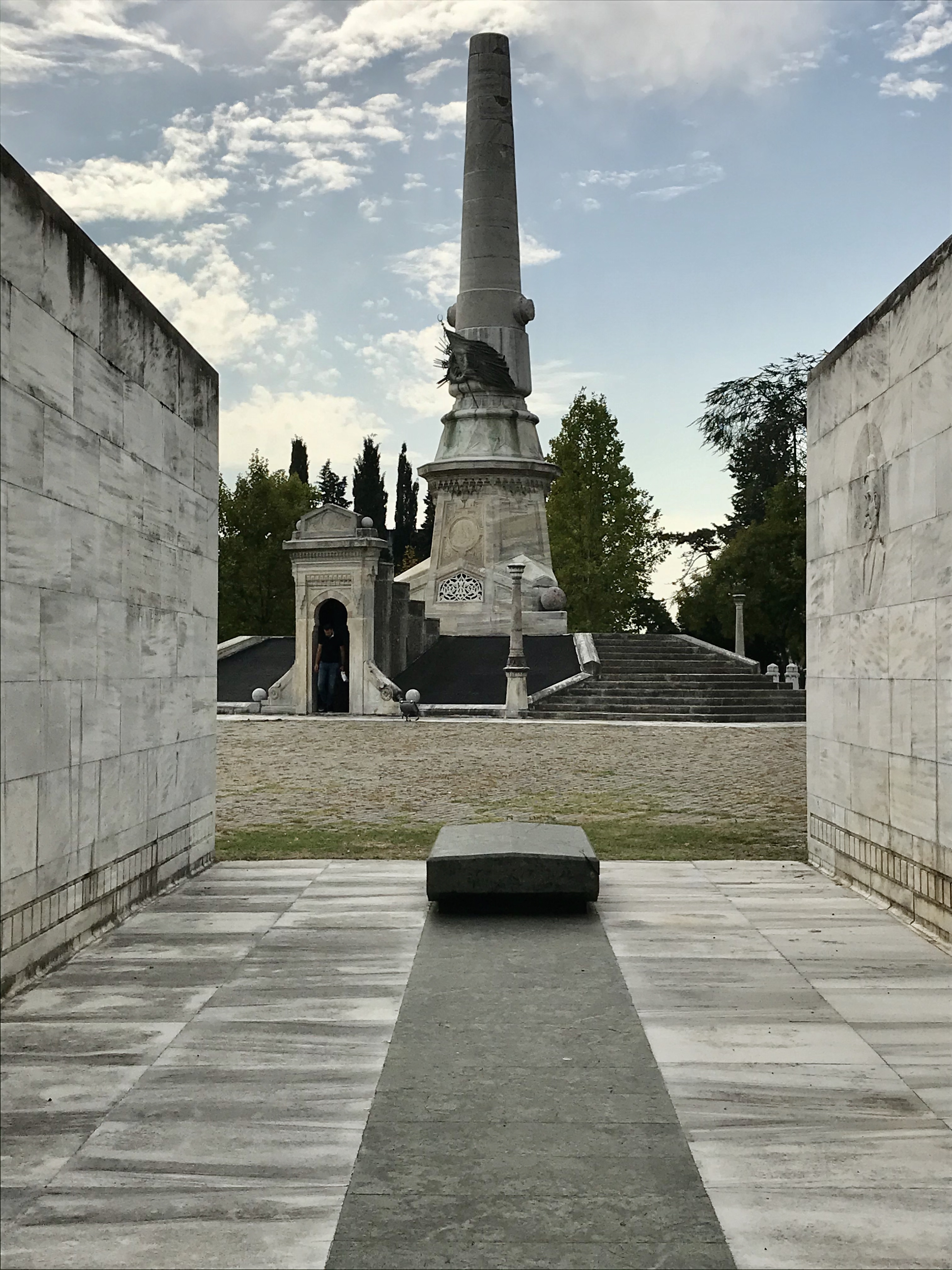
Abide-i Hürriyet monument in Mecidiyeköy

Mecidiyeöy barely features on the sightseeing radar although there are a couple of things to attract the curious, most obviously the Abide-i Hürriyet (Liberty Monument) isolated amid the traffic chaos where Halaskargazi Street meets the D100 flyover. The monument commemorates the so-called 31 March incident when counter-revolutionaries attempted to overturn the new Young Turk government and return Sultan Abdülhamid II to the throne. Their effort failed and shortly afterwards the sultan was removed from office. Work on the monument was completed in 1911 and it went on to become a site for memorials to some Young Turks leaders, Enver Paşa and Talat Paşa. There is also a monument to Mithad Paşa, a reformist grand vizier who died in exile in what is now Saudi Arabia. The assassinated grand vizier Mahmud Sevked Paşa was actually buried here.

Just to the south of the D100 flyway are three large cemeteries, one belonging to the Rum (Greek) Orthodox community, one to the Italian Jewish community and the third to the Armenian community. The Jewish cemetery is rarely open to outsiders. Buried in the Rum (Greek) Cemetery are the founders of the tiny and controversial Turkish Orthodox Church, Papas Eftim I, II and III.

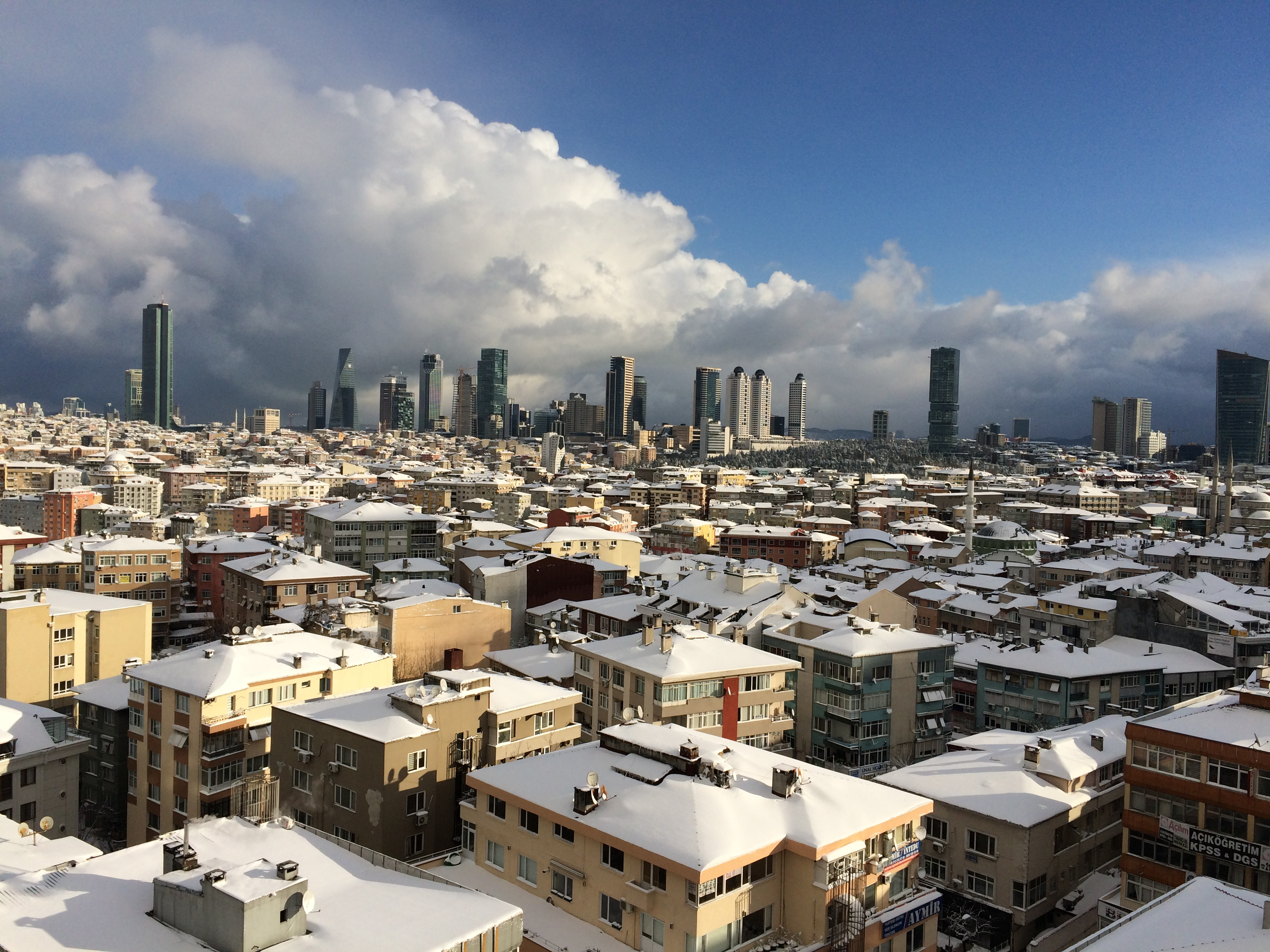
View of Levent from Mecidiyeköy

== Transportation ==
Mecidiyeköy is an important passenger transport hub on the European part of Istanbul. It is served by many important lines such as the Metrobus bus rapid transit line at Mecidiyeköy station, the M2 and M7 rapid transit lines at Şişli—Mecidiyeköy station, and various İETT bus lines.

The busy Halaskargazi street runs through Şişli to Mecidiyeköy where it intersects with the D100 motorway. The motorway Otoyol 1 that forms the inner half ring road of Istanbul connecting European and Asian parts via the Bosphorus Bridge, runs through Mecidiyeköy on a viaduct.

== See also ==
- Ali Sami Yen Stadium, demolished
- Istanbul Cevahir
- Profilo Shopping Center
- Trump Towers Istanbul
