= DLH =

DLH is a three-letter abbreviation which may refer to:

- Abbreviation for pre-war Deutsche Luft Hansa
- DLH Group, a Danish timber supply company
- Domestic long-haired cat
- Duluth International Airport in Duluth, Minnesota (IATA airport code DLH)
- Former abbreviation of General Directorate of the Infrastructural Investment in Turkey
- ICAO designator for Lufthansa, a German airline
- The Email-Domain for employees of Lufthansa.
- Station code of the Amtrak Thruway station in Duluth, Minnesota
- DLH, American data-platform abbreviation which may refer to: deductive lake house
