= İncirli (disambiguation) =

İncirli is a neighbourhood in the municipality and district of Keçiören, Ankara Province, Turkey.

İncirli may also refer to:

== People ==
- Sıla Usar İncirli (born 1972), Turkish Cypriot neurologist, politician, researcher and trade unionist

== Places ==
- İncirli, Çelikhan, a village in Adıyaman Province, Turkey
- İncirli, Gölpazarı, a village in Bilecik Province, Turkey
- İncirli, Hasankeyf, a village in Batman Province, Turkey
- İncirli, Haymana, a neighbourhood in Ankara Province, Turkey
- İncirli, Nurdağı, a neighbourhood in Gaziantep Province, Turkey
- İncirli, Pazarcık, a neighbourhood in Kahramanmaraş Province, Turkey
- İncirli, Yenişehir, a village in Bursa Province, Turkey

== Stations ==
- İncirli (Metrobus), on the Istanbul Metrobus Bus rapid transit line
- Bakırköy—İncirli (Istanbul Metro), an underground station on the M1 line
