= General Directorate of the Infrastructural Investments =

Turkish governmental establishment

- Altyapı Yatırımları Genel Müdürlüğü

Agency overview
- Formed: 1971
- Jurisdiction: Ministry of Transport and Communication
- Headquarters: Ankara, Turkey
- Website: aygm.uab.gov.tr

General Directorate of the Infrastructural Investments (Turkish: Altyapı Yatırımları Genel Müdürlüğü) is a Turkish governmental establishment responsible in official transportation investments.

== History ==
The directorate was established during the Ottoman Empire era as a part of Ministry of Public Works (Nafıa Nezareti in Ottoman Turkish). It was responsible in rail road construction and operation. In 1920, the directorate was transferred from Istanbul to Ankara, the newly established capital of Turkey. In 1938, the department of Sea Services which previously had been a part of the Ministry of Economy was merged to the directorate. Next year, the operational services were handed to the relevant establishments in other ministries and the responsibility of the directorate was limited to construction. In 1956 another directorate responsible in airport construction as well as pipelines was established within the same ministry. In 1971, both directorates were merged with. Next year, the name of the directorate was officially declared as Railways, Harbors, Airports Directorate (Demiryolları, Limanlar, Hava Meydanları Genel Müdürlüğü, DLH for short). Although, the Directorate was divided into three between 1977–1983, it resumed its former status in 1983. However in 1986, the directorate was transferred from The Ministry of Public works to the Ministry of Transport. In 2011 its name was changed to General Directorate of the Infrastructural Investments (AYGM for short).
