= Avcılar Merkez Üniversite Kampüsü (Metrobus) =

General information
- Location: D.100, Üniversite Mah., 34320; Avcılar/Istanbul; Turkey
- Coordinates: 40.9834°N 28.7262°E
- System: İETT Bus rapid transit station
- Owner: Istanbul Metropolitan Municipality
- Operator: İETT
- Line: Metrobüs
- Platforms: 1 side platform
- Connections: İETT Bus: 76, 76B, 76BA, 76C, 76D, 76G, 76O, 76TM, 76Y, 142, 142A, 142ES, 142F, 142K, 144A, 145, 146, 146BA, 303A, 400A, 401, 429, 429A, 448, 458, BM4, HS2, HT29, HT48

Other information
- Station code: 33 (IETT)

History
- Opened: 17 September 2007

Services
Preceding station	İETT	Following station
Terminus	34	Şükürbey towards Zincirlikuyu
Terminus	34AS	Şükürbey towards Söğütlüçeşme
Cihangir Üniv. Mahallesi towards Beylikdüzü Sondurak	34G	Şükürbey towards Söğütlüçeşme
Cihangir Üniv. Mahallesi towards Beylikdüzü Sondurak	34C	Şükürbey towards Cevizlibağ
Cihangir Üniv. Mahallesi towards Beylikdüzü Sondurak	34BZ	Şükürbey towards Zincirlikuyu
Location

Avcılar Merkez Üniversite Kampüsü, or just Avcılar is a station on the Istanbul Metrobus Bus rapid transit line. It is located between the D.100 state highway in Avcılar, Istanbul. The station is the terminus for two of the seven metrobus routes; 34 and 34AS.

Avcılar station was opened on 17 September 2007, as part of the original 16 stations of the Istanbul Metrobus system.
