= Zincirlikuyu (Metrobus) =

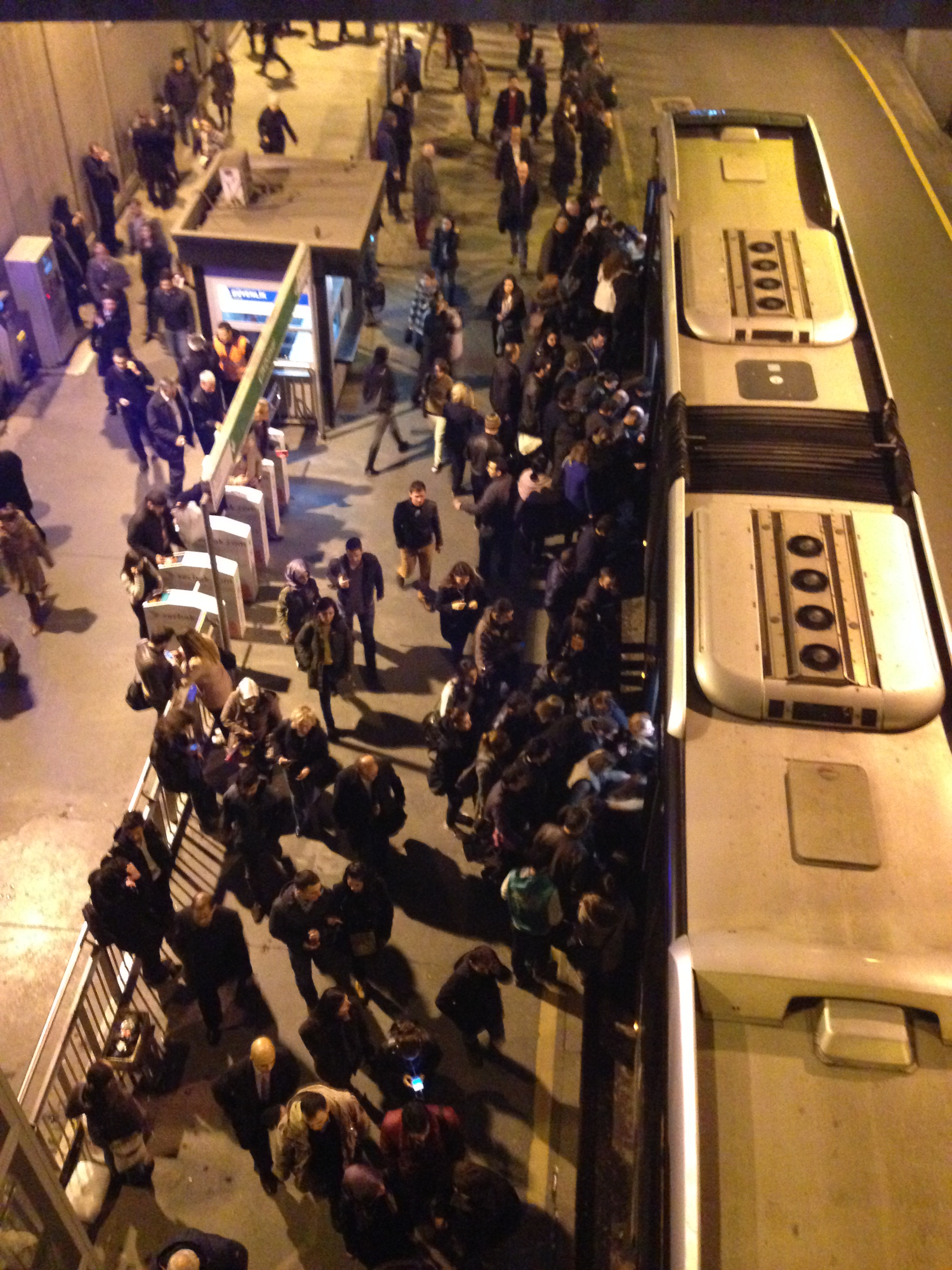
- Passengers boarding a westbound bus.

General information
- Location: Barbaros Blv., Balmumcu Mah., 34349; Beşiktaş/Istanbul; Turkey
- Coordinates: 41.0661°N 29.0130°E
- System: İETT Bus rapid transit station
- Owner: Istanbul Metropolitan Municipality
- Operator: İETT
- Line: Metrobüs
- Platforms: 2 side platforms
- Connections: Istanbul Metro at Gayrettepe Metrobus: 34, 34A, 34G, 34Z, 34AS, 34BZ at Zincirlikuyu İETT Bus: 25G, 27E, 27SE, 27T, 29, 29A, 29C, 29D, 29İ, 29P, 29Ş, 30A, 30M, 36G, 36L, 36Z, 40B, 41AT, 41E, 42, 42M, 42Z, 43R, 50Z, 58A, 58N, 58S, 58UL, 59A, 59B, 59CH, 59K, 59N, 59R, 59S, 59UÇ, 64Ç, 65G, 121A, 121B, 121BS, 122B, 122C, 122D, 122M, 122Y, 202, 251, 252, 256, 522, 522ST, 599C, 622, DT1, DT2, U1, U2; Istanbul Minibus: Beşiktaş-Sarıyer, Beşiktaş-Tarabya, Zincirlikuyu-Ayazağa, Zincirlikuyu-Bahçeköy, Zincirlikuyu-Poligon Mahallesi, Zincirlikuyu-Pınar Mahallesi, Zincirlikuyu-Vadistanbul

Other information
- Station code: 8 (IETT)

History
- Opened: 8 September 2008

Services
Preceding station	İETT	Following station
Mecidiyeköy towards Avcılar	34	Terminus
Mecidiyeköy towards Beylikdüzü Sondurak	34BZ	Terminus
Mecidiyeköy towards Beylikdüzü Sondurak	34G	Boğaziçi Köprüsü towards Söğütlüçeşme
Mecidiyeköy towards Avcılar	34AS	Boğaziçi Köprüsü towards Söğütlüçeşme
Mecidiyeköy towards Cevizlibağ	34A	Boğaziçi Köprüsü towards Söğütlüçeşme
Terminus	34Z	Boğaziçi Köprüsü towards Söğütlüçeşme
Location

Zincirlikuyu is a station on the Istanbul Metrobus Bus rapid transit line. It is located beneath Barbaros Boulevard and between the Istanbul Inner Beltway in south Levent. The station is a terminus for three of the seven Metrobus bus routes, leading to frequent transfers between Buses. A connection to the M2 of the Istanbul Metro is available as well as several city bus lines. Due to its location near the city's main financial district, Zincirlikuyu is one of the busiest stations on the Metrobus system.

The station was opened on 8 September 2008 as part of the ten station eastward expansion of the line.
