= Söğütlüçeşme (Metrobus) =

Metrobus station

General information
- Location: Ziverbey Yolu, Hasanpaşa Mah., 34349; Kadıköy/Istanbul; Turkey
- Coordinates: 40.9917°N 29.0375°E
- System: İETT Bus rapid transit station
- Owner: Istanbul Metropolitan Municipality
- Operator: İETT
- Line: Metrobüs
- Platforms: 1 side platform
- Connections: TCDD Taşımacılık: Marmaray at Söğütlüçeşme; İETT Bus: 2, 8E, 9K, 10B, 10E, 10G, 14AK, 14B, 14CE, 14ES, 14Y, 14ÇK, 14ŞB, 15SK, 15YK, 15ÇK, 17, 17L, 19ES, 19F, 19K, 19M, 19S, 19Y, 20D, 20K, ER1, ER2, FB1, FB2, GZ1, GZ2

Other information
- Station code: 1 (IETT)

History
- Opened: 3 March 2009

Services
Preceding station	İETT	Following station
Fikirtepe towards Beylikdüzü Sondurak	34G	Terminus
Fikirtepe towards Avcılar	34AS	Terminus
Fikirtepe towards Cevizlibağ	34A	Terminus
Fikirtepe towards Zincirlikuyu	34Z	Terminus
Location

Söğütlüçeşme is the eastern terminus of the Istanbul Metrobus Bus rapid transit line. It is located along Ziverbey Road, just west of the Istanbul Inner Beltway, adjacent to the Söğütlüçeşme railway station. Connection to Marmaray commuter rail service as well as high-speed, intercity and regional rail will be available towards the end of 2018.

Söğütlüçeşme station was opened on 3 March 2009 as part of the eastward expansion of the line across the Bosporus.
