= Cevizlibağ (Metrobus) =

General information
- Location: D.100, Maltepe Mah., 34010; Zeytinburnu/Istanbul; Turkey
- Coordinates: 40.0164°N 28.9107°E
- System: İETT Bus rapid transit station
- Owner: Istanbul Metropolitan Municipality
- Operator: İETT
- Line: Metrobüs
- Platforms: 1 island platform
- Connections: Tram: İETT Bus: 31, 31E, 33B, 41AT, 50B, 71T, 72T, 73, 73F, 76D, 79Ş, 82, 85C, 85T, 89, 89B, 89K, 92, 92T, 97, 97A, 97B, 97BT, 97T, 500L, H-9, MR11; Istanbul Minibus: Cevizlibağ-Yenimahalle, Merter-Cevizlibağ, Cevizlibağ-Yıldıztabya; Istanbul Dolmuş: Taksim-Cevizlibağ

Other information
- Station code: 19 (IETT)

History
- Opened: 17 September 2007

Services
Preceding station	İETT	Following station
Merter towards Avcılar	34	Topkapı towards Zincirlikuyu
Merter towards Beylikdüzü Sondurak	34BZ	Topkapı towards Zincirlikuyu
Merter towards Beylikdüzü Sondurak	34G	Topkapı towards Söğütlüçeşme
Merter towards Avcılar	34AS	Topkapı towards Söğütlüçeşme
Terminus	34A	Topkapı towards Söğütlüçeşme
Merter towards Beylikdüzü Sondurak	34C	Terminus
Location

Cevizlibağ is a station on the Istanbul Metrobus Bus rapid transit line. It is located between the D.100 state highway in Zeytinburnu, Istanbul. The station is served by six of the seven metrobus routes and a terminus for two of them; 34A and 34C. Connection to the T1 tram line is available.

Cevizlibağ station was opened on 17 September 2007, as part of the original 16 stations of the Istanbul Metrobus system.
