= Beylikdüzü Sondurak (Metrobus) =

Beylikdüzü—Sondurak
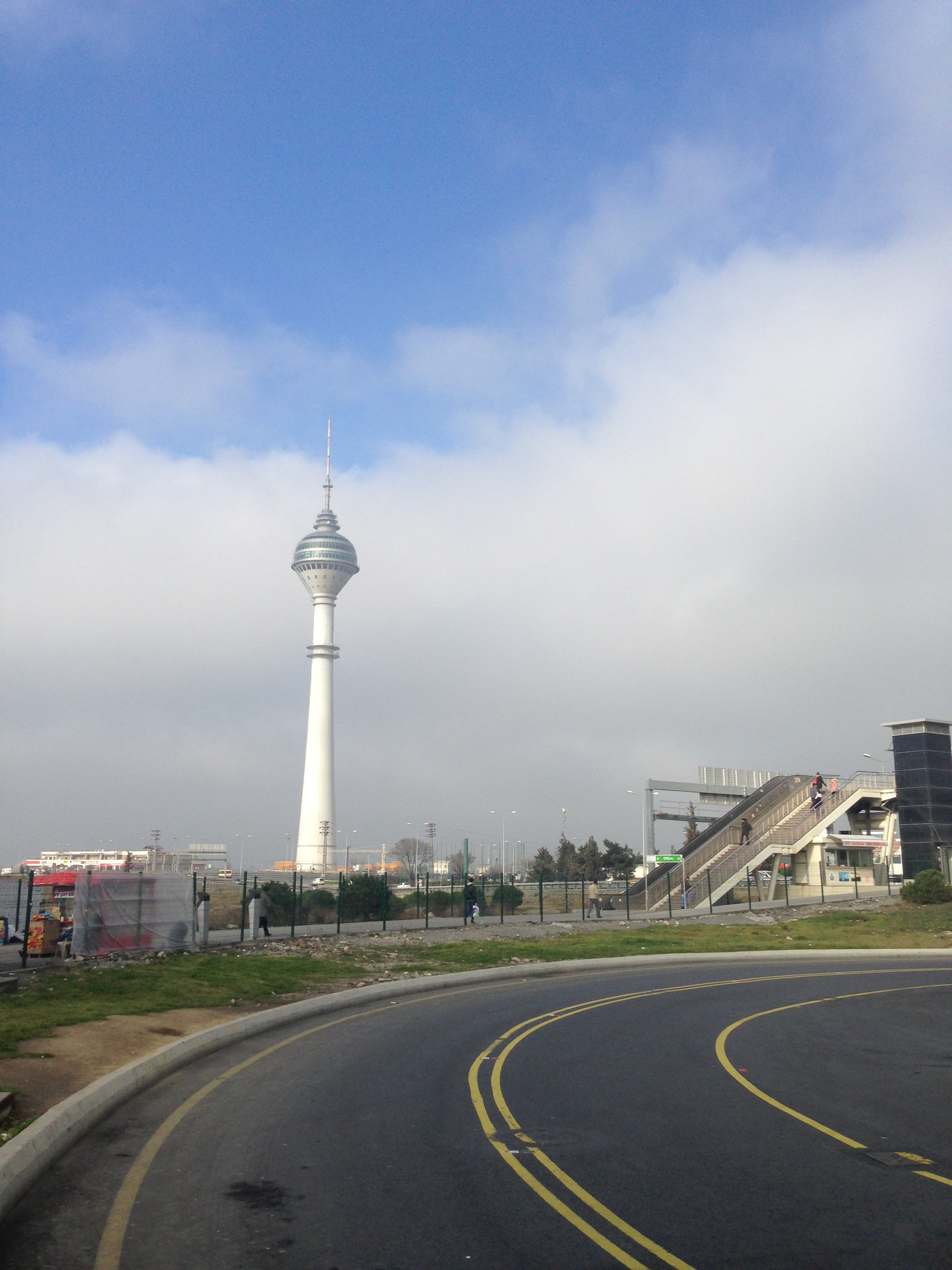
- Looking west from the station towards the Endem TV Tower.

General information
- Location: Büyükçekmece Yolu, Cumhuriyet Mah., 34500; Beylikdüzü/Istanbul; Turkey
- Coordinates: 41.0221°N 28.6245°E
- System: İETT Bus rapid transit station
- Owner: Istanbul Metropolitan Municipality
- Operator: İETT
- Line: Metrobüs
- Platforms: 1 side platform
- Connections: İETT Bus: 76TM, 142B, 144B, 300, 300G, 303, 401, 401T, 448, ES2, HT48, İST-2; Istanbul Minibus: Celaliye-TÜYAP, Mimaroba-TÜYAP, Muratçeşme-TÜYAP, Tepekent-TÜYAP, TÜYAP-Hadımköy

Construction
- Structure type: at-grade, with passenger access bridges

Other information
- Fare zone: 44 (IETT)

History
- Opened: 19 July 2012

Services
Preceding station	İETT	Following station
Terminus	34C	Hadımköy towards Cevizlibağ
Terminus	34BZ	Hadımköy towards Zincirlikuyu
Terminus	34G	Hadımköy towards Söğütlüçeşme
Location

Beylikdüzü—Sondurak is the western terminus of the Istanbul Metrobus Bus rapid transit line. It is located along Büyükçekmece Road adjacent to the D.100 state highway. It is the westernmost public transport station in Istanbul.

Beylikdüzü—Sondurak station was opened on 19 July 2012 as part of the westward expansion of the line.

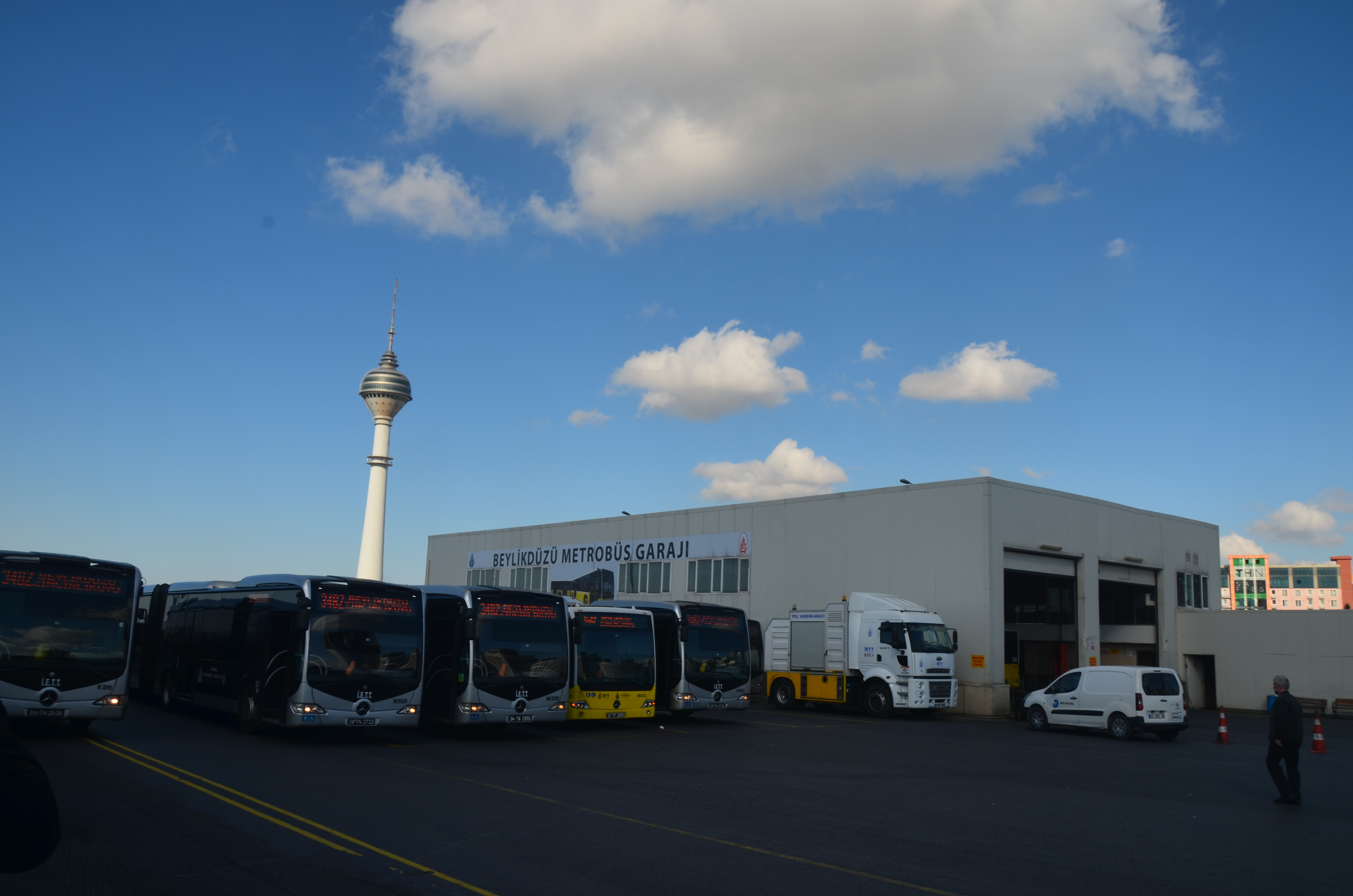
Metrobus Garage at Beylikdüzü Sondurak
