= Metrobus (Istanbul) =

Bus rapid transit route in Istanbul, Turkey

Metrobüs

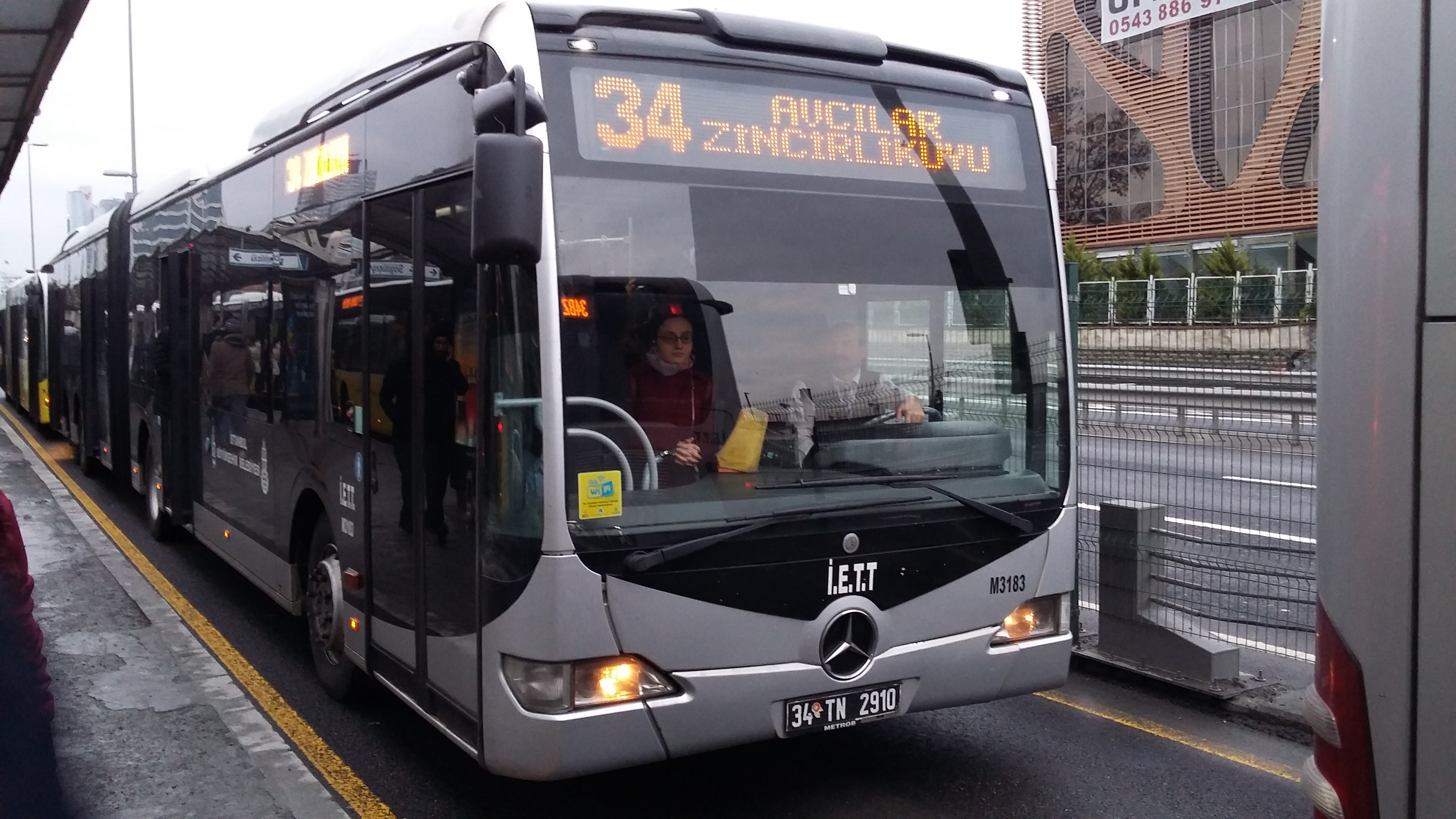

Overview
- Locale: Istanbul
- Transit type: Bus rapid transit (BRT)
- Number of lines: 1
- Number of stations: 44
- Daily ridership: 1,000,000

Operation
- Began operation: 17 September 2007
- Operator: IETT
- Number of vehicles: 334

Technical
- System length: 52 km (32.3 mi)

The Metrobus (Turkish: Metrobüs) is a 52 km (32.3 mi) bus rapid transit route in Istanbul, Turkey. The system has 44 stations that follow the city's ring road via Avcılar, Zincirlikuyu and the Bosphorus Bridge to Söğütlüçeşme using dedicated bus lanes for almost the entire length of the route. (Note: The Bosphorus Bridge does not have dedicated bus lanes, but does provide priority to Metrobus vehicles.)

The busway, the first section of which opened in 2007 after two years of construction, is used by a number of Metrobus lines which operate within a 'closed' system carrying 1 million people daily. Turkish authorities have since assisted with the development of a similar system in Lahore, Pakistan, which opened in 2013. Its name was coined by the İETT to suggest that the system is a hybrid between a metro train (Turkish: metro) and a bus (Turkish: otobüs).

The BRT corridor Avcılar - Söğütlüçeşme is certified to meet the BRT Standard with excellence: silver (2022)

From 2007 to 2025 Istanbul was the only Turkish city with a metrobus line. The second Turkish metrobus line was opened in Sakarya on 15 July 2025.

== History ==
=== Planning and construction ===
Construction of the first section of the busway, between Avcılar (serving Istanbul University's Avcılar campus) and Topkapı started in 2005.

=== Operation ===
The busway opened on September 17, 2007. It was then extended in an easterly direction from Topkapı to Zincirlikuyu, and then from Zincirlikuyu to Söğütlüçeşme, the latter of which is on the Anatolian side of Istanbul. In 2012, it was extended from Avcılar to a western residential suburb, Beylikdüzü.

== Route ==
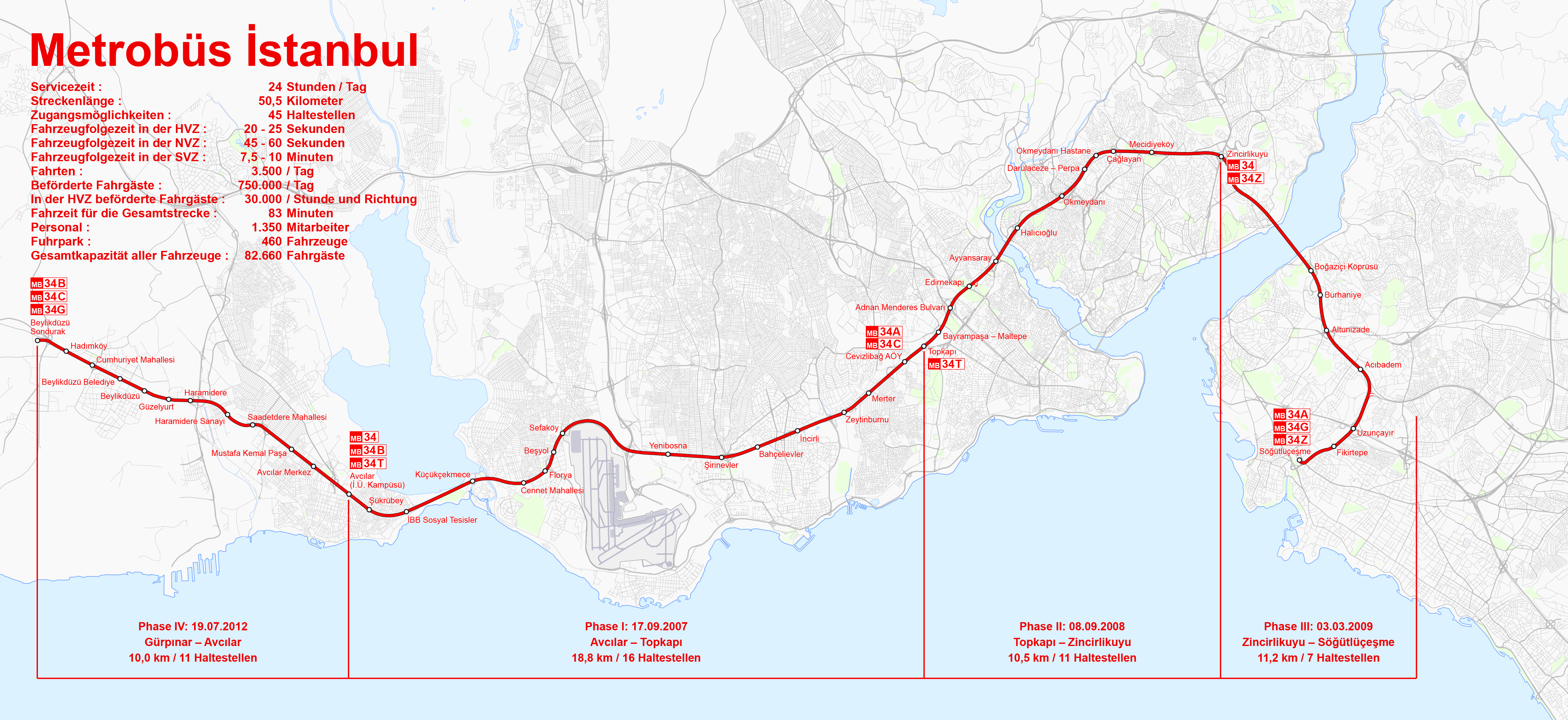
The route and stops of the Metrobus.

The busway is approximately 50 km (31 mi) in length and has 45 stations, with one lane each direction following Istanbul's main highway D.100.

The system mainly follows the city's ringroad, with a fully separated right-of-way between Avcılar and Zincirlikuyu and between the eastern end of the Bosphorus Bridge and Söğütlüçeşme. There are no intersections with a dedicated bus lane in each direction with few passing lanes. Buses drive on the left-hand side of the bus lane, so that their doors, designed for conventional operation with door to the right-hand side of the vehicle, open onto the bidirectional central platforms. Most services operate only with the 'closed' BRT system.

The following table shows the interval between buses (headway) for each of three sections of the line for vehicles traveling in an easterly direction; intervals for buses in the other direction are similar.

The system implements all-door-boarding except for the late night time. The buses perform compulsory stopping except for the late night time (there is an internal PA when the line operates in the request stopping regime).

Section of Route	Avcılar – Topkapı			Edirnekapı – Zincirlikuyu			Bosphorus Bridge – Söğütlüçeşme
Days of week	Weekday	Saturday	Sunday	Weekday	Saturday	Sunday	Weekday	Saturday	Sunday
Average headway (during busiest hour)	0:14	0:24	0:36	0:17	0:24	0:40	0:42	1:05	1:15
Average headway (between 1am to 6am)	2:00	2:51	6:00	4:17	2:51	6:00	8:34	6:40	6:40
Average headway (over 24 hours)	0:28	0:45	1:19	0:40	0:46	1:24	1:33	1:59	2:15
Number of Trips / Day	3,138	1,919	1,093	2,180	1,895	1,023	926	726	642

Times above shown as 'minutes:seconds'

== Lines ==
There are six main services, each operating on different sub-sections of the route, and also the infrequent Beylikdüzü - Söğütlüçeşme which operates over the full length for the busway, which is deployed in late night times and/or times with overall low anticipated demand, such as a curfew or a widespread travel restriction.

Table showing the number of trips made by different lines using the busway

Route Termini	Daily Number of Trips			Notes
Route Termini	Weekdays	Saturdays	Sundays & Holidays	Notes
Avcılar – Zincirlikuyu	1,824	1,732	1,012
Avcılar – Topkapı	1,284	174	70
Zincirlikuyu – Söğütlüçeşme	570	566	631
Edirnekapı – Söğütlüçeşme	326	150	0
Beylikdüzü – Söğütlüçeşme	30	10	11	Night service
Total	4,034	2,632	1,724

== Proposed developments ==
At the eastern end, a new extension to Göztepe is planned.

== Fleet ==
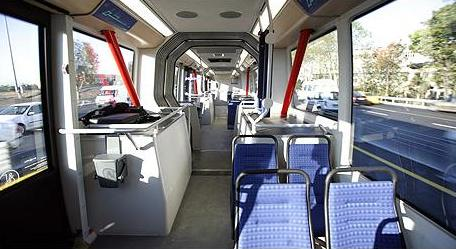
Inside of a Metrobüs, Phileas brand vehicle

Metrobus Fleet
Vehicle	Length (meters)	Number of seats	Passenger Capacity	Number of Axles
Mercedes-Benz Conecto G	18.00	42	149	3
Mercedes CapaCity	19.54	42	193	4
Akia Ultra LF25	25.00	29	286 (dispatch target 225)	5
Otokar Kent XL	21.00	38	220 (dispatch target 180)	4

== Controversy and criticism of Phileas buses ==
=== Reliability and safety ===
It has been suggested that Phileas buses, which are now rarely used, were underpowered and not strong enough to carry heavy passenger loads and climb steep hills typical of the topography of Istanbul. The hillclimbing aspect of this perception, though widely reported by the press, does not appear to have much evidential basis.

İETT's stated loading capacity (no. of people) for Phileas buses was considerably higher than that of the manufacturer. According to Phileas manufacturer APTS, the total capacity of the Phileas buses bought by İETT was 185 passengers. In comparison, former İETT president Mehmet Öztürk stated that the buses could safely operate with upwards of 280 passengers.

The single-lane Metrobus roads are frequently blocked by Phileas buses breaking down, causing delays for the all buses in a single direction. In May 2009, then-İETT president Mehmet Öztürk invited press members to "falsify untrue allegations against the Phileas brand buses". During the demonstration, another Phileas bus operating on the same lane broke down, thus blocking the route of the press bus for approximately five minutes. Öztürk later argued that the accident was the result of operator error. Also in 2009, İETT dismissed concerns regarding their institutional incompetence and the design of Phileas buses, citing "the very high loading at peak hours as the reason for malfunctioning rather than the road slope."

Phileas buses were designed with the capacity to use an electronic guided bus system. Öztürk pointed out that the guided bus system ensured that Phileas buses were safer than others, and that, even in the case of a front tire blowing out at speeds of up to 80 kilometers per hour, the vehicle would not crash. Despite his confidence in the safety of Phileas buses, one caught on fire in early 2015, further deepening concerns amongst the press and the Istanbulite public regarding their reliability and safety.

The manufacturers of the Phileas buses, APTS, were taken to court in 2010 by İETT over the failures. In 2017, CHP MP Gürsel Tekin stated that former Minister of the Interior Beşir Atalay, along with other members of the AKP cabinet, twice prevented the Istanbul Metropolitan Municipality (İBB) from initiating an investigation into the matter. An official investigation was launched by the government with the company.

=== Finances and corruption allegations ===
The purchase of the Phileas buses was widely criticized in media as a waste of resources. In 2007, each Phileas bus cost 1.2 million Euros, (Note: 1.45 million inflation-adjusted Euros as of 2020.) and a total of 63 million Euros was paid by İETT to acquire 50 of them. In contrast, a Mercedes-Benz CapaCity only cost 300,000 Euros, (Note: 363,000 inflation-adjusted Euros as of 2020.) and proved to be much more useful for the Metrobus. In 2008, civil service inspectors from the Ministry of the Interior uncovered 100 million Euros worth of irregular financial transactions in the İETT, chiefly relating to the purchase of the Phileas fleet. Their report to the Ministry, implicating high-ranking İETT officials including former president Mehmet Öztürk, indicated that the 63 million Euro purchase was made without a tender. By the request of the inspectors, a judicial investigation into İETT leadership was initiated by the Beyoğlu Office of the Chief Public Prosecutor, with Öztürk providing a written testimony.

== Stations and route stopping patterns ==
Shaded boxes indicate route operates from the station.

- Routes
1. 34 (Avcılar – Zincirlikuyu)
2. 34A (Söğütlüçeşme – Cevizlibağ AÖY)
3. 34AS (Avcılar – Söğütlüçeşme)
4. 34BZ (Beylikdüzü – Zincirlikuyu)
5. 34C (Beylikdüzü – Cevizlibağ)
6. 34G (Beylikdüzü – Söğütlüçeşme)
7. 34U (Uzunçayır – Zincirlikuyu)
8. 34Z (Zincirlikuyu – Söğütlüçeşme)

Stations & Route Stopping Patterns
Station	Routes							
Station	34	34A	34B	34C	34G	34T	34U	34Z
Route length (km)	30	22	10	29	52	15	11	11.5
Route duration (min)	60	50	22	57	100	60	25	30
Number of stations	26	19	12	26	44	15	6	8
Söğütlüçeşme								
Fikirtepe								
Uzunçayır								
Acıbadem								
Altunizade								
Burhaniye								
15 Temmuz Şehitler Köprüsü								
Zincirlikuyu								
Mecidiyeköy								
Çağlayan								
Okmeydanı Hastanesi								
Darülaceze – Perpa								
Okmeydanı								
Halıcıoğlu								
Ayvansaray – Eyüpsultan								
Edirnekapı								
Bayrampaşa - Maltepe - Koç Üniversitesi Hastanesi								
Topkapı								
Cevizlibağ								
Merter								
Zeytinburnu								
İncirli								
Bahçelievler								
Şirinevler								
Yenibosna								
Sefaköy								
Beşyol								
Florya								
Cennet Mahallesi								
Küçükçekmece								
İBB Sosyal Tesisleri								
Şükrübey								
Avcılar Merkez								
Cihangir Üniversite Mahallesi								
Mustafa Kemal Paşa								
Saadetdere Mahallesi								
Haramidere Sanayi								
Haramidere								
Güzelyurt								
Beylikdüzü								
Beylikdüzü Belediyesi								
Cumhuriyet Mahallesi								
Beykent								
Beylikdüzü Son Durak								

== See also ==
- Public transport in Istanbul
- Istanbul nostalgic tramways
- Sabiha Gökçen Airport
- Ferries in Istanbul
- Istanbul Airport
- Istanbul Metro
- Istanbul Tram
- Marmaray
