= Istanbul Electricity, Tram and Tunnel Establishments =

Transportation authority in Istanbul

- İstanbul Elektrik, Tramvay ve Tünel İşletmeleri

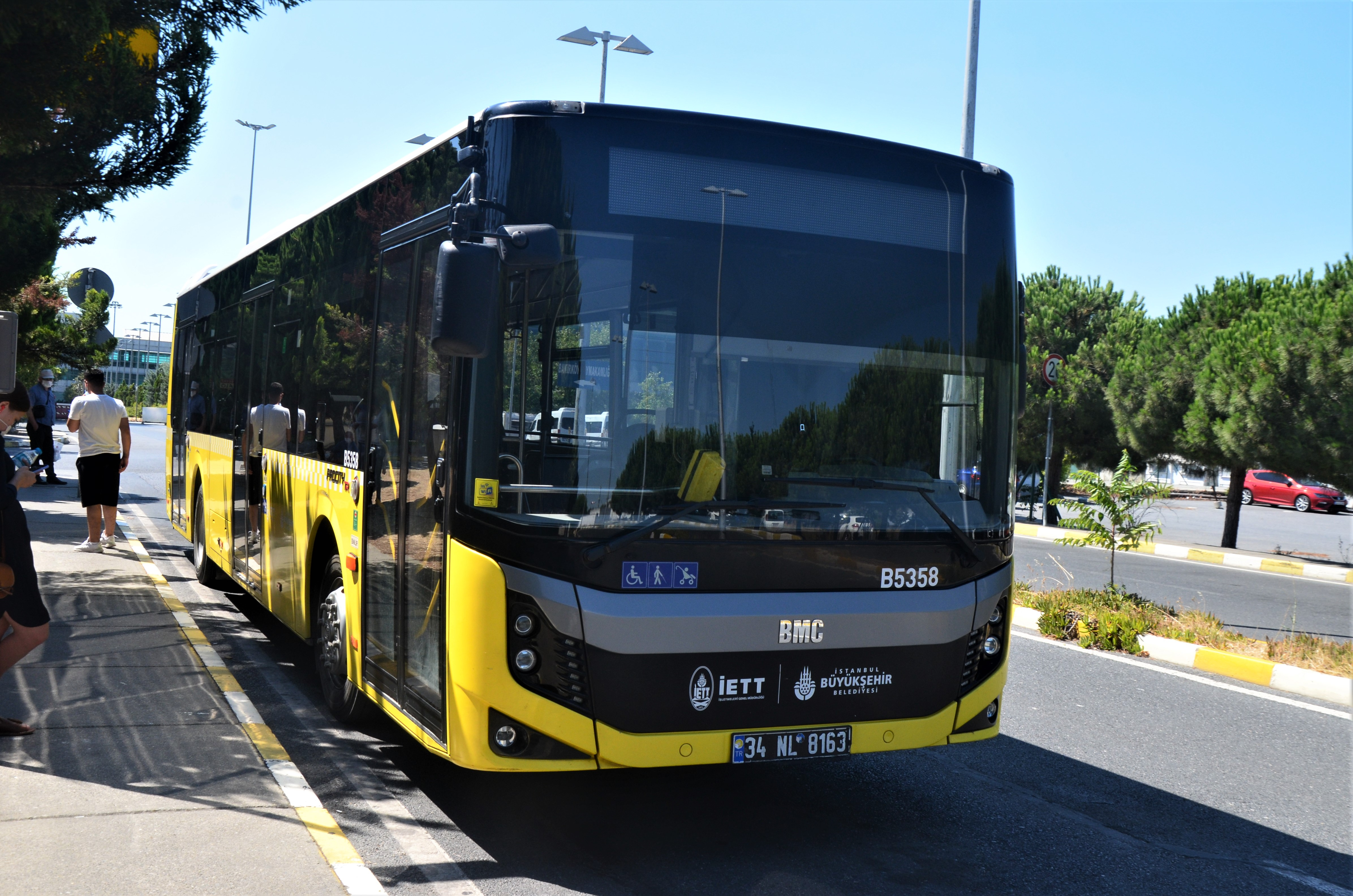
- A BMC Procity bus operated by the IETT

Agency overview
- Formed: 1871 (155 years ago)
- Headquarters: Istanbul
- Employees: 10,469 (2023)
- Annual budget: 15 billion, 400 million TL (2023)
- Agency executive: İrfan Demet, General Director
- Parent agency: Istanbul Metropolitan Municipality
- Website: iett.istanbul

The Istanbul Electricity, Tram and Tunnel Establishments (Turkish: İstanbul Elektrik, Tramvay ve Tünel İşletmeleri) or İETT is the transportation authority in Istanbul connected to the Istanbul Metropolitan Municipality specializing in public transportation.

== History ==
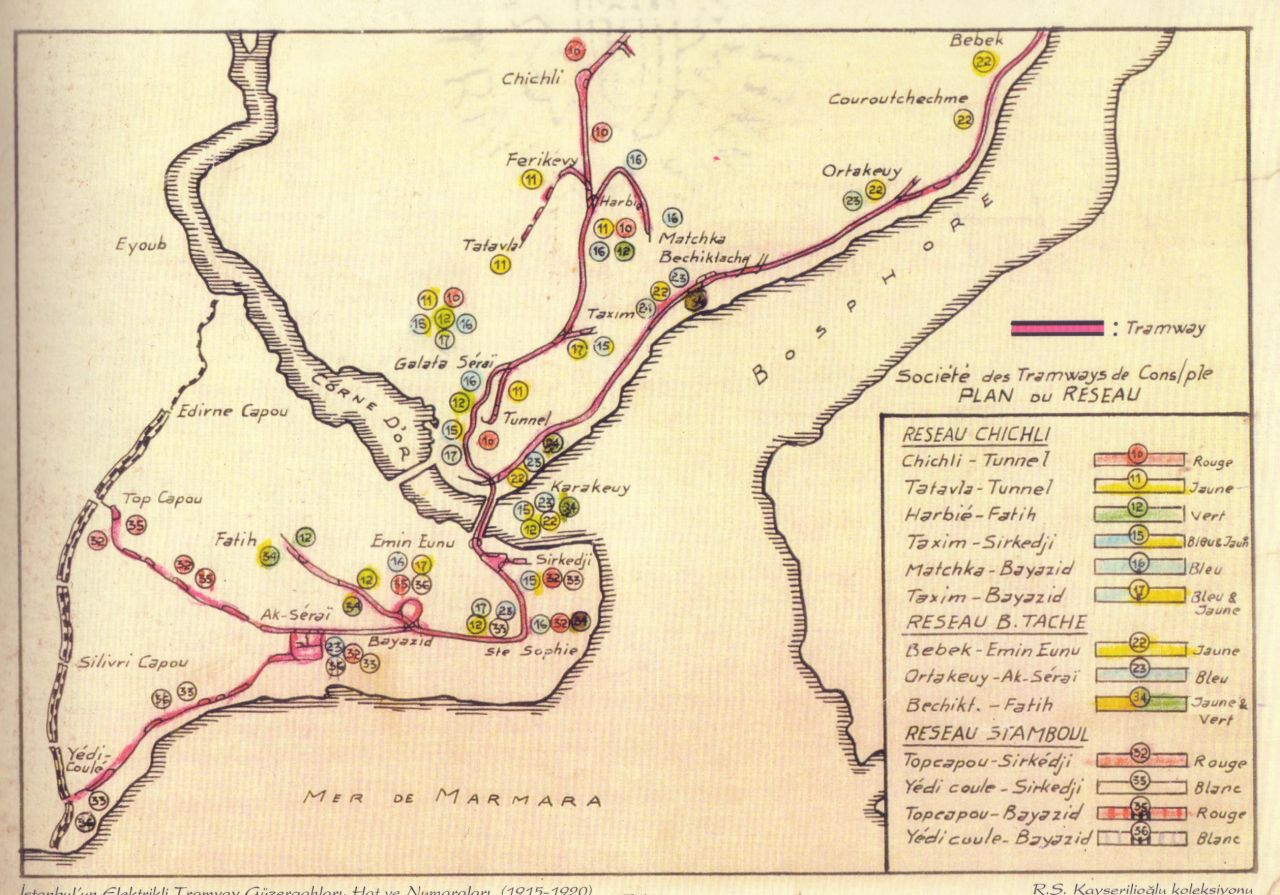
Tram lines in 1920

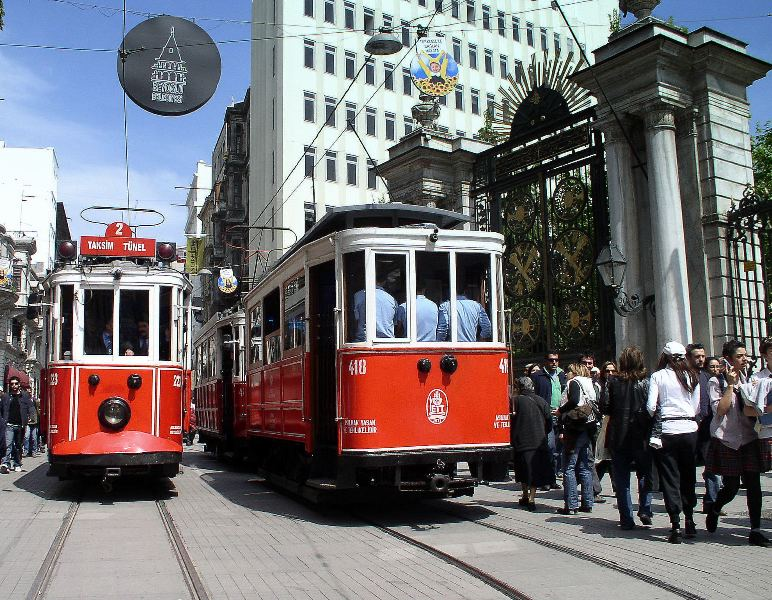
Two nostalgic trams meeting on the Taksim - Tünel nostalgic tram line

After nationalizing various companies and combining them in 1939 with law 3645, the “Istanbul Electric Tram and Tunnel General Directorate” reached the status it has today. In 1945 the Yedikule and Hasanpaşa Coal gas factories and the pipes fed by this factory that distributed coal gas to Istanbul and Anatolia were handed over to the IETT. IETT constructed a trolleybus system in 1961, and opened it in 1962, and it operated until 1984. A law passed in 1982 gave all authority and right over electricity to the Turkish Electricity Administration (TEK). Coal gas production and distribution was ended in 1993. Today, the IETT only handles public transportation including buses, trams and tunnels as well as the administration, management and supervision of Istanbul Ulaşım A.Ş.

=== Tram ===
Urban transportation in Istanbul began with the founding of the Dersaadet Tram Company and the decision to construct the Tünel. In 1871, this company began providing horse-drawn tram services for various routes including Azapkapı - Galata, Aksaray - Yedikule, Aksaray - Topkapı and Eminönü - Aksaray and amassed 4.5 million people in its first year. The 45 trams on these routes were pulled by 430 horses on meter gauge railway. In 1912, during the Balkan Wars, all horses were sent to the front line, and therefore all horse-drawn tram services were suspended for a year.

On February 2, 1914, tram lines were electrified. On June 8, 1928, a new tram line was opened between Üsküdar and Kısıklı. On October 29, 1933, all 320 trams and 4 buses were ordered directly by Mustafa Kemal Atatürk to fully operate, as part of the 10th year anniversary celebrations of the founding of the Republic. By 1950 tram routes had reached 130 kilometers in total. In 1956, the trams had their peak year, with 108 million people using 56 tram lines and 270 trams in total. After the 1960 coup d’état, tram services started to be phased out for more modern trams. The lines were replaced to support more up-to date motorized trams that could go faster. The old trams continued servicing the European side until August 12, 1961 and the Anatolian side until November 14, 1966. Today, IETT runs the nostalgic tram line T2 from Taksim to Tünel, which runs on the famous Istiklal Avenue, and the line T3 operating as a ring in Moda, Kadıköy.

Tünel

Alongside with trams, construction of the Tünel (lit. 'Tunnel') began in 1871. It opened on December 5, 1874, making it the second-oldest underground train line after the London Underground. Used only for livestock and cargo at first, it opened for passenger transportation on January 17, 1875.

=== Bus ===
Starting from 1871, to help the existing tram lines, the Dersaadet Tram Company was given permission to operate buses, although little is known about this period. In 1926, 4 Renault-Scémia brand buses were purchased and one of these buses subsequently began operating between on June 2, 1927, between Beyazıt and Taksim as a trial. The remaining buses started operating between Beyazıt and Eminönü, with stops in between. This route was later extended to Karaköy.

During the nationalization and merging with the IETT, the company had only three buses. In 1942, 23 buses were ordered from the White Motor Company. The first part of this order, comprising nine buses, arrived in pieces inside crates and were shipped to Turkey via ship on February 27, 1942. But because of the growing war, they were first dropped off at the Port of Alexandria in Egypt. In 1943, the crates were moved to Istanbul under harsh conditions, but it was determined that there were missing pieces. After the materials were taken from customs, they were immediately assembled, but because the factory in the United States stopped production, only nine White Motor Company buses could enter service. The other 14 that couldn't reach Istanbul were scrapped. Alternative routes were opened for these buses. In 1947, two buses were scrapped. After Scania-Vabis buses were ordered in bulk, the remaining 7 buses were retired.

By the end of that same year, 25 Scania-Vabis brand motorbuses were imported from Sweden and allocated to the IETT. From April 1943 to 1944, 20 new buses were bought, creating a fleet of 29 buses. After a fire in the Ankara bus garage on October 17, 1946 this fleet, alongside a fleet from Hatay was sent to replace the damaged buses.

A short while after, 12 Twin Coach, 2 Chevrolet and 1 Fargo brand buses were bought to make a fleet of 15 with the help of the municipality. These buses continued servicing Istanbul until 1955. Until 1960 the IETT purchased buses from various brands including Škoda, Mercedes, Büssing and Magirus, making a total fleet size of 525 buses, followed by a purchase of 300 buses from the Leyland Motors company in England. Bus purchased continued in 1979-1980 with Mercedes-Benz, Magirus and Ikarus brand buses and with MAN in 1983-1984. In 1993, the IETT purchased the first double-deck bus to enter service, the DAF Optare. In 1998 Mercedes brand, human and eco-friendly buses, and in 2006 buses with the eco-friendly Euro III engine that were purchased by the IETT entered service.

The IETT had 3,059 buses in service in 2014. These were single, articulated and Metrobus. The IETT has 900 Otokar, 540 Karsan Bredamenarinibus, 1569 Mercedes-Benz and 50 Phileas. The IETT also has 3,075 buses under the Private Public Bus (Turkish: Özel Halk Otobüs) brand.

Under the law passed on September 17, 2020, by the Metropolitan Municipality Council, buses under Istanbul Ulaşım A.Ş. and Private Public Bus are to operate under one color under IETT's roof.

Metrobus

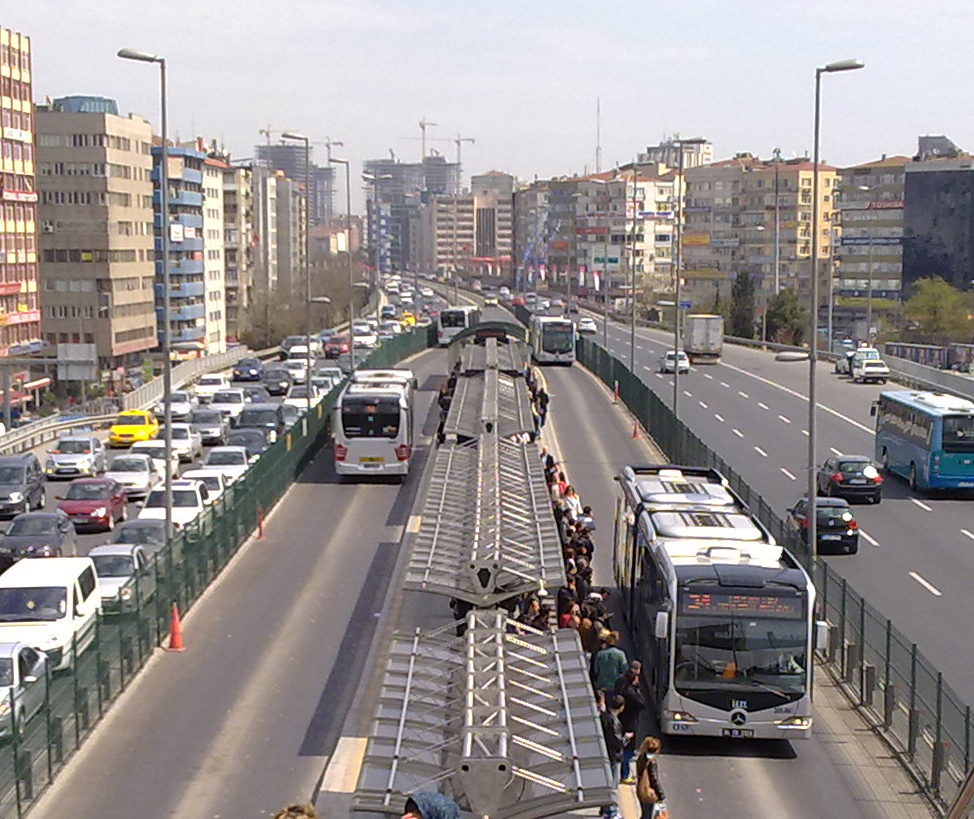
Mecidiyeköy Metrobus Stop

In 2007, the Metrobus line started service. On this line, high capacity, air-conditioned, low floor and accessible buses are used. In 2022, the Metrobus carried an average of 800,000 people per day.

=== Trolleybus ===
Due to the trams that had operated on both sides of Istanbul being unable to keep up with demand, the tram system was replaced on the European side by a trolleybus system in the early 1960s, with trolleybuses chosen over conventional buses for their being more economically viable. Trolleybuses served almost 20 routes, with 100 vehicles operating on around 45 kilometres (28 mi) of route until 1984, when 75 of the 101 trolleybuses were sold to ESHOT to be used on the İzmir trolleybus system and the Istanbul system was closed, with the justification that frequent power outages caused the buses to cause traffic jams on the roads.

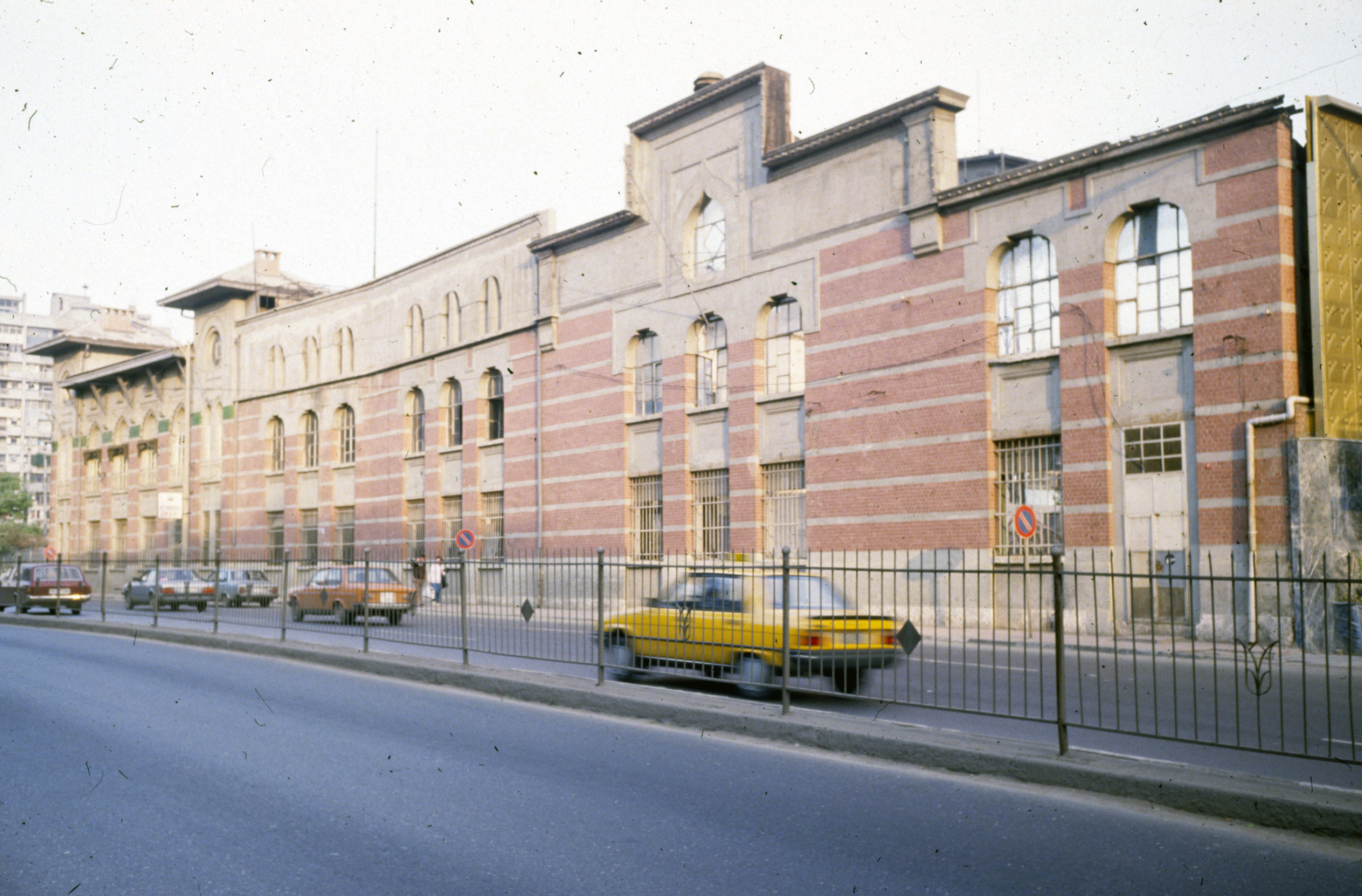
Şişli Depot, used for trams and trolleybuses until 1987

=== Electricity ===
Turkey's first electricity distribution company came to life in Istanbul. Under the modernization movements during the Second Constitutional Era, the right to distribute electricity was given to the Ganz Corporation after careful investigation. In 1911, the Ganz Corporation formed the Ottoman Incorporated Electricity Company (Turkish: Osmanlı Anonim Elektrik Şirketi), producing electricity for trams after the First World War.

After the founding of the Republic, The Ministry of Public works (Turkish: Nafıa Velaketi) enacted the Private Electric Company (Turkish: Özel Elektrik Şirketi) on December 31, 1937, for 11,500,000 Turkish liras, taking the name of General Directorate for Electric Works (Turkish: Elektrik İşleri Umum Müdürlüğü). The Directorate was responsible for production and distribution of electricity.

The IETT Management General Directorate (Turkish: İETT İşletmeleri Umum Müdürlüğü) formed on June 16, 1939, with the intent of taking over the distribution and production of electricity until 1952, in which they started buying electricity from Etibank. On July 25, 1970, with the law of the Turkish Electricity Institution (Turkish: Türkiye Elektrik Kurumu), TEK became responsible for distribution of electricity. In 1982, distribution of electricity was completely handed over to TEK.

=== Coal Gas ===
Production of Coal gas in Istanbul is started in 1853, intending to illuminating the Dolmabahçe Palace. The production and distribution business, which was carried out by private companies with foreign capital first in Yedikule until 1878 and later in Kadıköy in 1891, was transferred to IETT in 1945 with the law numbered 4762, after having changed hands a few times.

With the transfer of Beyoğlu Polygon Gas Factory, the IETT became a monopoly in gas production and distribution. The company, which also produced and sold coke and employed around a thousand people, had an average daily capacity of 300 thousand cubic meters until it was liquidated in June 1993 due to the introduction of natural gas into daily life and outdated technology.

== Fleet ==
All buses in the fleet are low floor.

Brand	Model	Production Years	Type	Quantity	Fleet Code
Akia	Ultra LF25	2021	Double Articulated	106	A5001-A5107
BMC	Procity	2012	Solo	4	B3001-B3004
BMC	Procity	2016	Solo	44	B4001-B4044
BMC	Procity TR	2017	Solo	381	B5001-B5381
Karsan BM	Avancity CNG	2013	Solo	245	K1001-K1248
Karsan BM	Avancity S Plus	2013	Articulated	309	K1501-K1810
Green Car	LSV 4 Cabin		Solo	20	
Green Car	S 14 Cabin		Solo	40	
Mercedes-Benz	Citaro	2006-2007	Solo	380	M2001-M2394
Mercedes-Benz	Citaro G	2006	Articulated	98	M2501-M2600
Mercedes-Benz	CapaCity	2007-2008-2009	Articulated	249	M3001-M3250
Mercedes-Benz	Conecto G	2012	Articulated	265	M4501-M4765
Mercedes-Benz	Conecto G	2015	Articulated	137	M4801-M4926
Otokar	Kent 290 LF	2013	Solo	919	O1001-O1306/O2001-O2306/O3001-O3303
Otokar	Kent 290 LF	* 2012	Solo	23	O4001-O4023
Otokar	Otokar Kent XL	2021	Articulated	120	O5001-O5120
Temsa	Temsa Avenue	* 2014	Solo	107	T1001-T1108
SGMS	Mastiff M4		Solo	60	
Cleanvac	Emiro		Solo	50	
Total				3541	

=== Bus Depots ===
Depot	District	Type
Anatolian Side
Anadolu	Ataşehir	City service
Hasanpaşa Şehit Ahmet Dokuyucu	Kadıköy	Metrobüs
Kurtköy	Pendik	City service
Samandıra Parklanma	Sancaktepe	City service
Sarıgazi	Sancaktepe	City service
Şahinkaya	Beykoz	City service
Yunus	Kartal	City service
European Side
Avcılar Merkez Kampüsü	Avcılar	Metrobüs
Beylikdüzü	Beylikdüzü	Metrobüs
Cebeci	Sultangazi	City service
Edirnekapı	Eyüpsultan	Metrobüs
İkitelli	Küçükçekmece	City service
Kağıthane	Kağıthane	City service
Topkapı	Fatih	City service

== Gallery ==
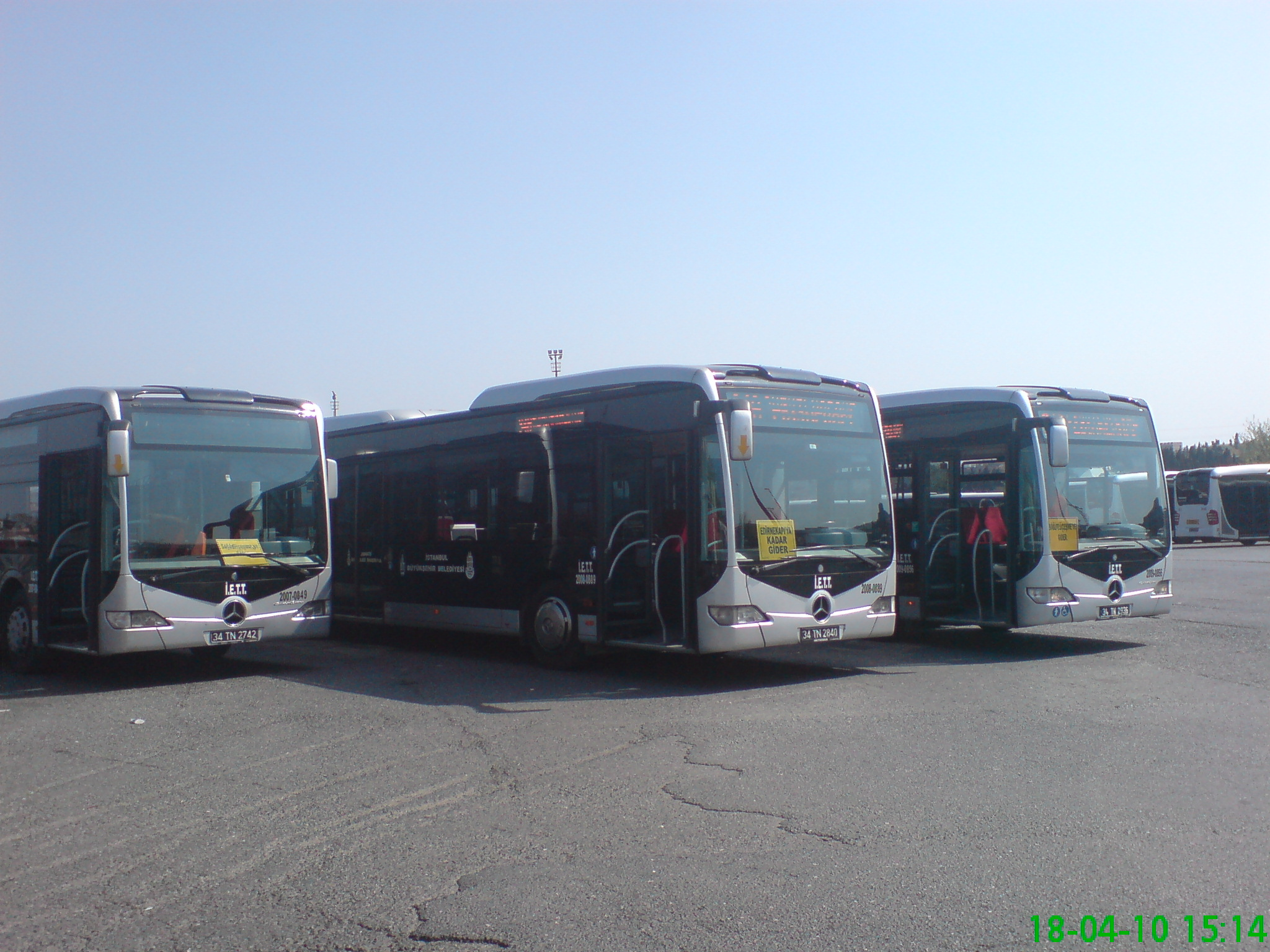
Mercedes-Benz CapaCity buses used on the Metrobus.

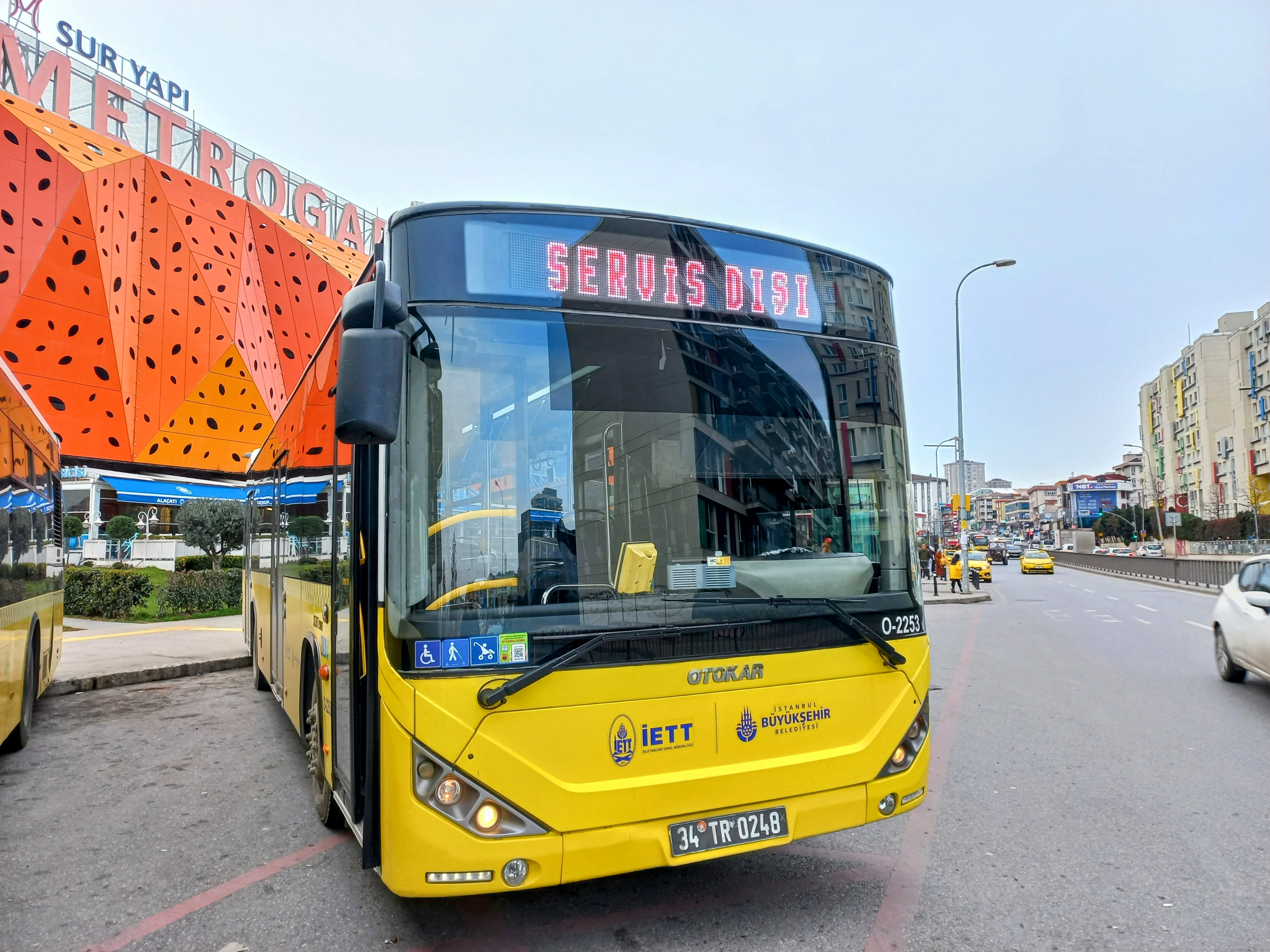
Otokar Kent model bus waiting for departure.

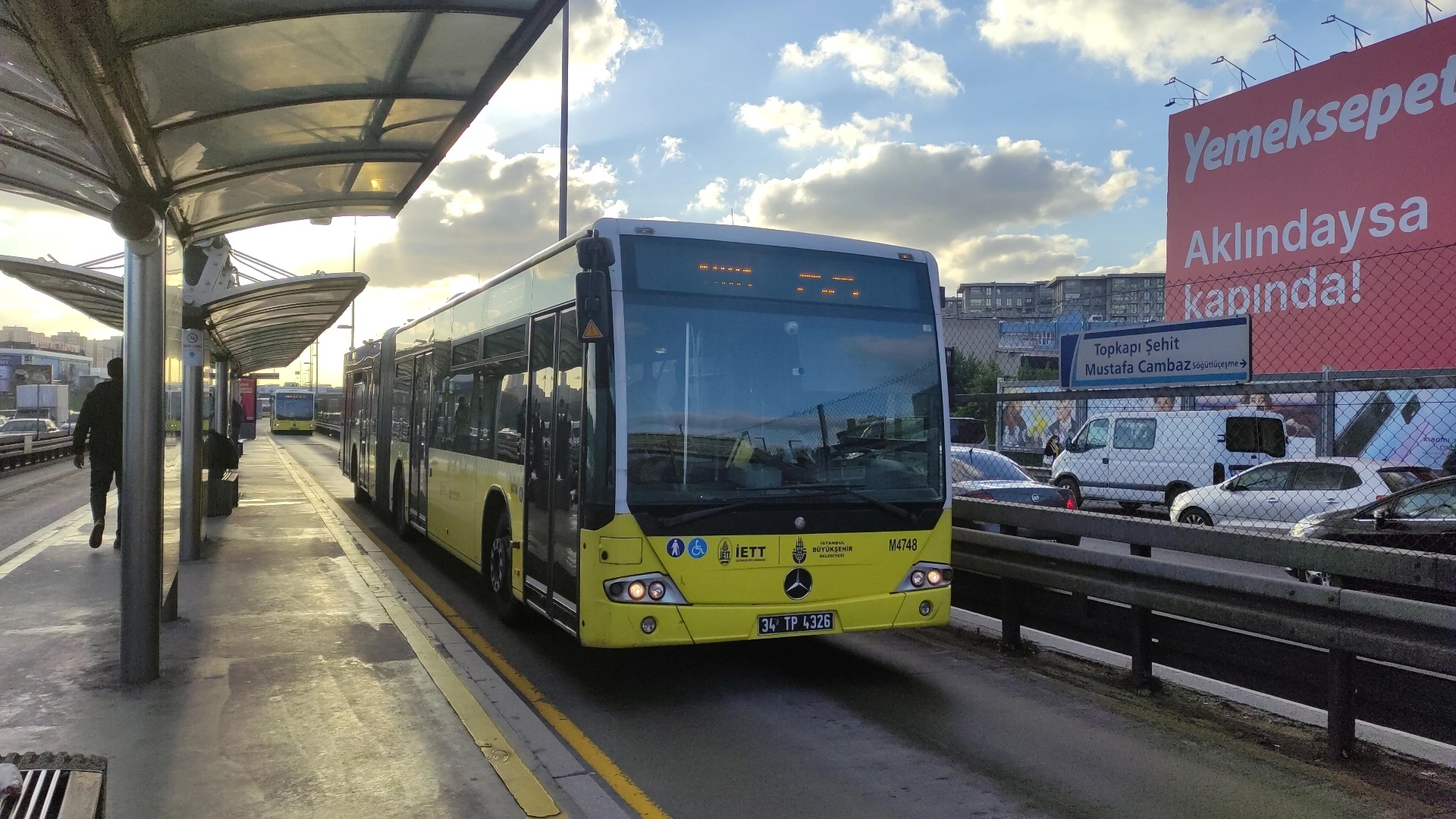
Mercedes-Benz Citaro bus on the Metrobus line.

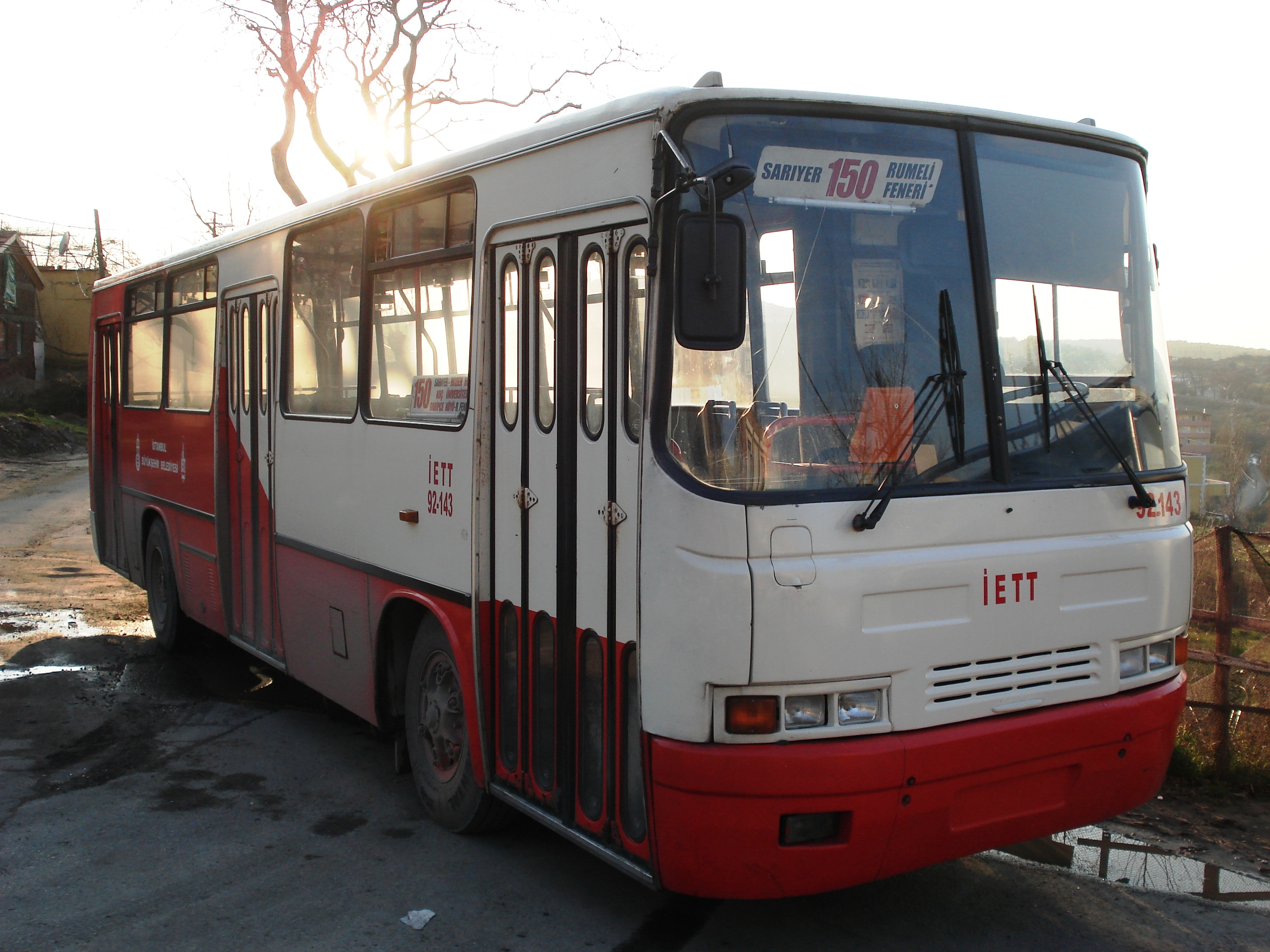
Ikarus bus no longer in the fleet.

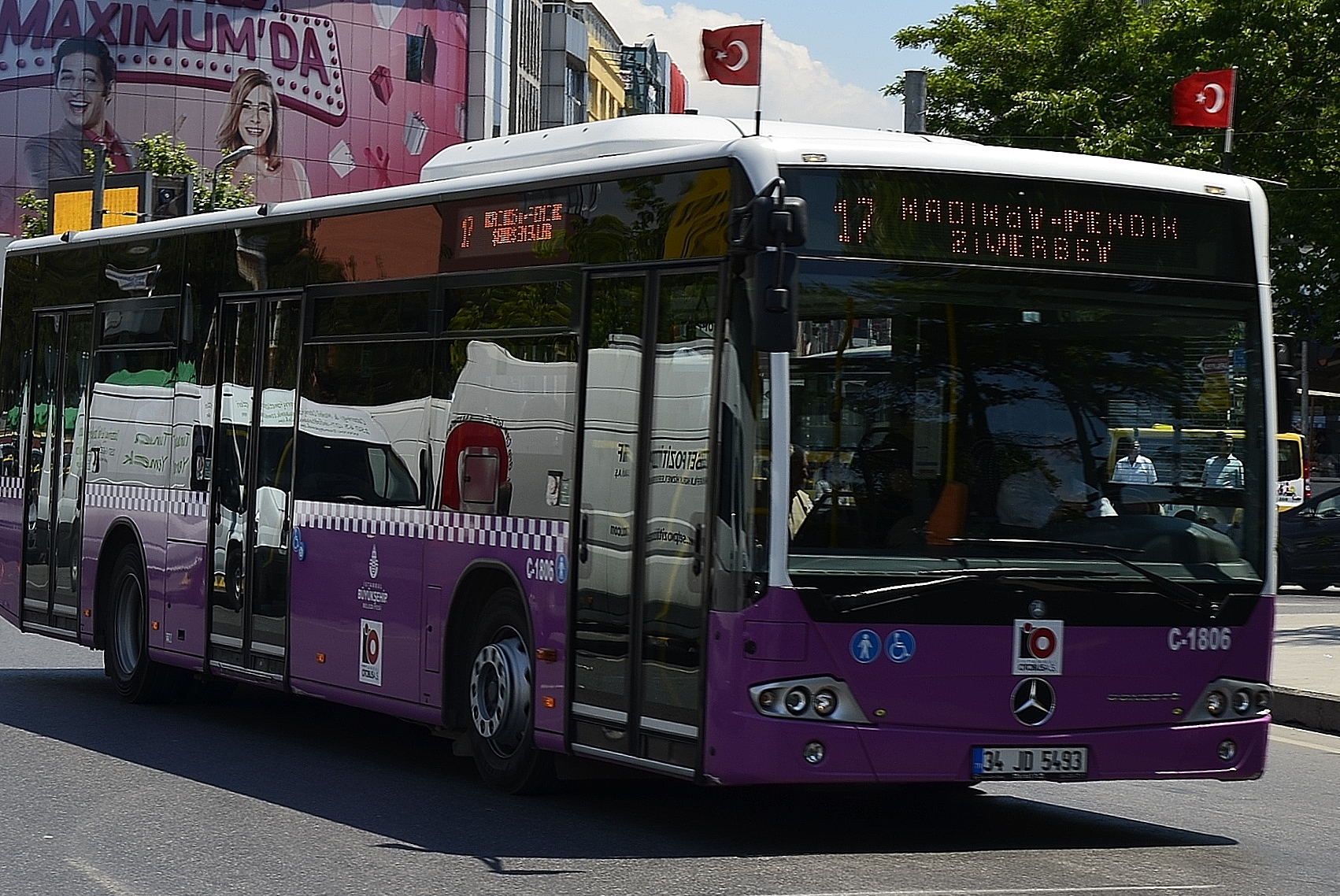
Bus in the old purple livery (Private Public Bus).

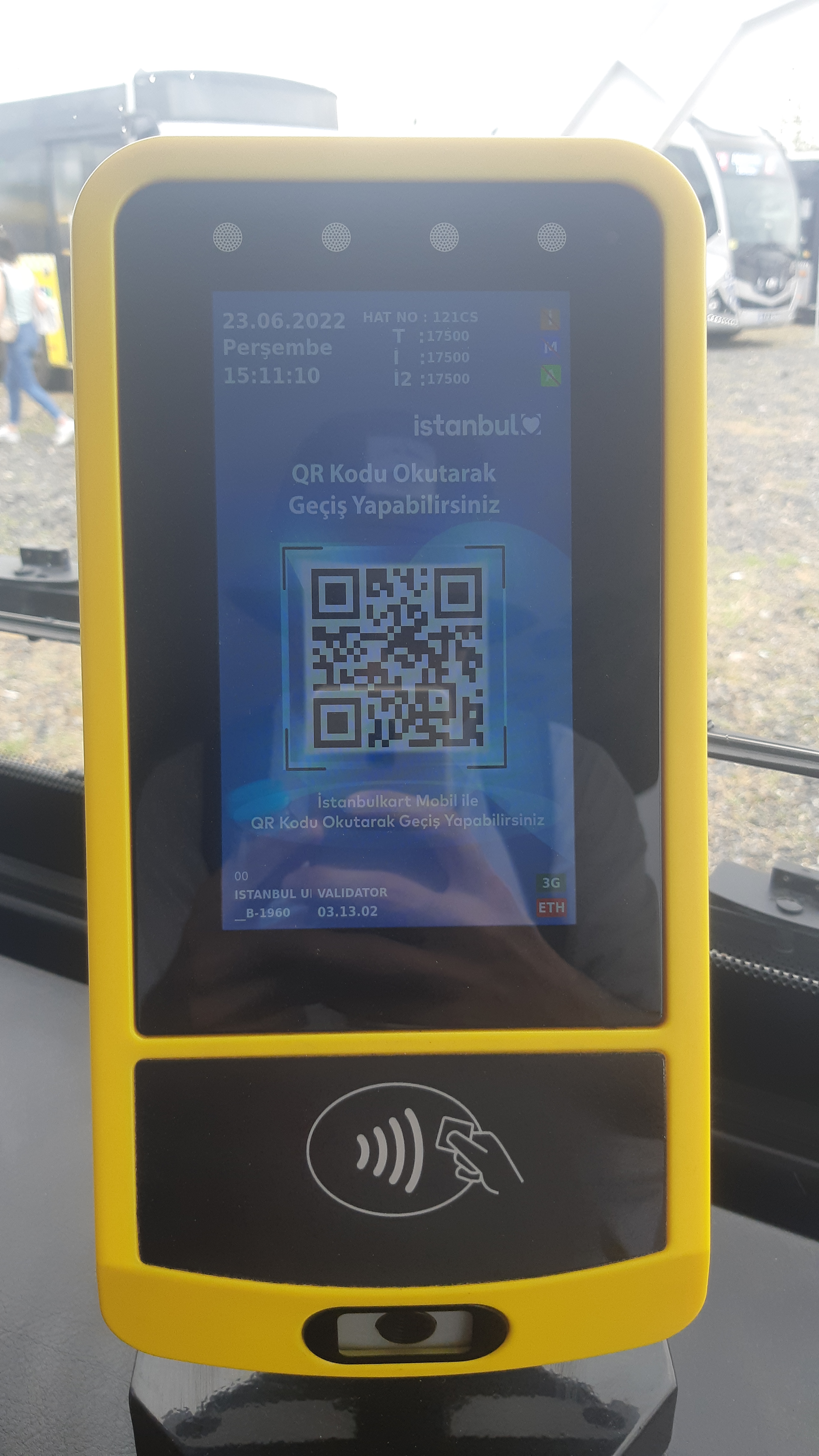
IstanbulKart reader on a bus, equipped with QR code.

== See also ==
- Public transport in Istanbul
- Istanbulkart
- Istanbul nostalgic tramways
- Metrobüs
- Transport in Turkey
- Boji (dog)
