= Istanbul Canal =

Artificial sea-level waterway project in Turkey

- Planned route of the canal
- Location: Istanbul
- Country: Turkey

Specifications
- Length: 45 km (28 miles)
- Maximum boat length: 350 m (1,148 ft 4 in)
- Maximum boat beam: 77.5 m (254 ft 3 in)
- Maximum boat draft: 17 m (55.8 ft)
- Status: Pre-feasibility studies commenced April 2009, feasibility studies conducted April 2012, Construction has started June 2021

Geography
- Direction: One way at a time
- Start point: Black Sea
- End point: Sea of Marmara
- Beginning coordinates: 41.3375°N 28.6975°E
- Ending coordinates: 40.9800°N 28.7675°E
- Connects to: Lake Küçükçekmece

The Istanbul Canal (Turkish: Kanal İstanbul pronounced [kɑnɑɫ isˈtɑnbuɫ]) is a project for an artificial sea-level waterway planned by Turkey in East Thrace, connecting the Black Sea to the Sea of Marmara, and thus to the Aegean and Mediterranean seas. The Istanbul Canal would bisect the current European side of Istanbul and thus form an island between Asia and Europe (the island would have a shoreline with the Black Sea, Sea of Marmara, the new canal and the Bosporus). The new waterway would bypass the current Bosporus.

The canal aims to minimise shipping traffic in the Bosporus. It is projected to have a capacity of 160 vessel transits a day – similar to the current volume of traffic through the Bosporus, where traffic congestion leaves ships queuing for days to transit the strait. Some analysts have speculated that the main reason for construction of the canal is to bypass the Montreux Convention, which limits the number and tonnage of warships from non-Black Sea powers that could enter the sea via the Bosporus, as well as prohibiting tolls on traffic passing through it. Indeed, in January 2018, the Turkish Prime Minister Binali Yıldırım announced that the Istanbul Canal would not be subject to the Montreux Convention.

The Istanbul Canal project also includes the construction of ports (a large container terminal in the Black Sea, close to the Istanbul Airport), logistic centres and artificial islands to be integrated with the canal, as well as new earthquake-resistant residential areas along the channel. The artificial islands are to be built using soil dug for the canal. Transport projects to be integrated with the canal project include the Halkali-Kapikule high-speed train, the Turkish State Railways project, the Yenikapi-Sefakoy-Beylikduzu and Mahmutbey-Esenyurt metro lines in Istanbul and the D-100 highway crossing, Tem highway and Sazlibosna highway.

Financing the canal is expected to be via a build-operate-transfer model, but could also be funded through public-private partnerships. The government is expecting to generate US$8 billion in revenue per year from the Istanbul Canal, in part from a service fee for transits. Critics, such as Korkut Boratav, have questioned this number and said that the net revenues could be negative. Other criticisms include the need to direct resources for focusing on earthquake readiness and addressing economic issues, and potential negative environmental impacts.

== History ==
A canal linking the Black Sea with the Sea of Marmara has been proposed at least seven times.

=== Early proposals ===
The first proposal was made by the Ottoman sultan Suleiman the Magnificent (reigned 1520–1566). His architect, Mimar Sinan, was said to have devised plans for the project. The project was abandoned for unknown reasons.

On March 6, 1591, during the reign of Sultan Murad III, an imperial ferman (order) was issued and work on the project recommenced, but, again for unknown reasons, the project was stopped.

In 1654, during the reign of Sultan Mehmed IV, pressure for the recommencement of the canal was applied, but to no avail.

Sultan Mustafa III (reigned 1757–1774) attempted twice in 1760, but the project could not go ahead because of a lack of funds.

During the reign of Sultan Mahmud II (reigned 1808–1839), an Imperial Ottoman Committee was established to examine the project once again. A report was prepared in 1813, but no concrete steps were taken.

=== Modern proposals ===
The Energy Ministry's Consultant Yüksel Önem suggested constructing an alternative waterway to the Bosporus in the 1985 magazine of the Turkish Standards Institution and in the Science and Technical Magazine of the Scientific and Technological Research Council of Turkey in 1990.

In 1991, Nusret Avcı, head of the Istanbul Metropolitan Municipality Environment Commission, proposed that a canal 23 km (14 mi) long be constructed between Silivri and Karacaköy. He suggested that this channel would significantly reduce hazards of maritime traffic and pollution in the Bosporus.

Finally, on January 17, 1994, shortly before the local elections, the leader of the Democratic Left Party (DSP) Bülent Ecevit proposed a canal connecting the Black Sea with the Sea of Marmara.

Canal Istanbul was announced by President Recep Tayyip Erdoğan in June 2021. It would be large enough to accommodate VLCC class vessels.

== Project ==
=== Purpose ===
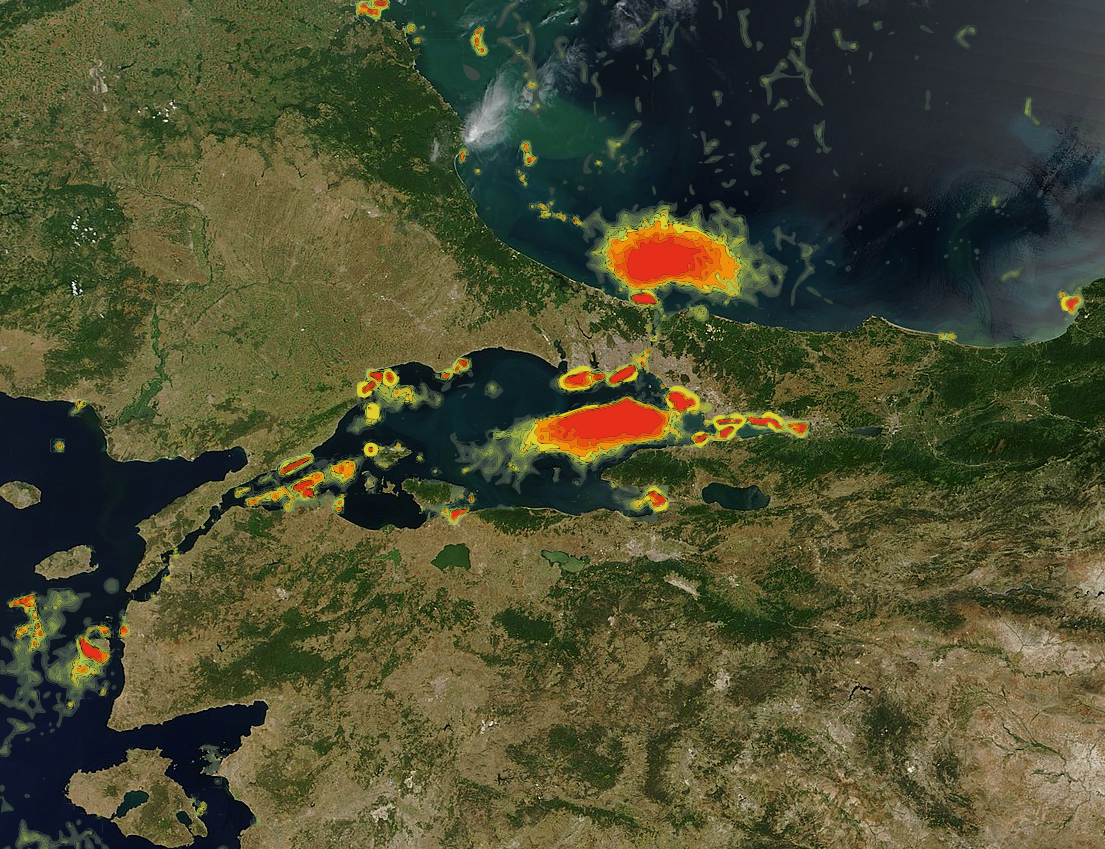
Heat map of marine traffic activity near Bosporus. Vessels are parked waiting to pass the Istanbul Strait

The stated purpose of the project is to reduce the large marine traffic through the Bosporus and minimise the risks and dangers associated particularly with tankers.

About 41,000 vessels of all sizes pass yearly through the Istanbul Strait, among them 8,000 tankers carrying 145 million tons of crude oil. International pressure is growing to increase the marine traffic tonnage through the Turkish straits, which brings risks for the security of marine navigation during the passage. The Bosporus sees nearly three times the traffic of the Suez Canal. The canal will further help prevent the pollution caused by cargo vessels passing through or mooring in the Sea of Marmara before the southern entrance of the Bosporus.

According to data of Ministry of Transport and Infrastructure, there was a decrease in total amount of vessels, but an increase in the amount of very large vessels and the total gross tonnage. The data are shown in the following table:

Year	Total gross tonnage	Vessels longer than 200 meters (660 ft)
2006	475,796,880	3,653
2007	484,867,696	3,653
2008	513,639,614	3,911
2009	514,656,446	3,871
2010	505,615,881	3,623
2011	523,543,509	3,800
2012	550,526,579	3,866
2013	551,771,780	3,801
2014	582,468,334	3,895
2015	565,216,784	3,930
2016	565,282,287	3,873
2017	599,324,748	4,005
2018	613,088,166	4,106
2019	638,892,062	4,400
2020	619,758,776	4,952
2021	631,920,375	5,306
2022	541,444,690	4,079
2023	621,638,378	4,770
2024	639,773,180	4,736
2025	619,298,004	4,314

=== Layout ===
On January 15, 2018, the route of the project was declared. The final route for Istanbul Canal was selected after studies on five alternative routes. The Ministry of Transport announced that the project will pass through Lake Küçükçekmece near the Marmara Sea. It will pass through the districts of Avcılar and Başakşehir before reaching the Black Sea in the Arnavutköy district north of the city. Seven kilometers of the route passes through Küçükçekmece, 3.1 kilometers goes through Avcılar, 6.5 kilometers goes through Başakşehir, and the major 28.6-kilometer part of the route goes through Arnavutköy.

The waterway will have a length of 45 km (28 mi), with a depth of 20.75 m (68.1 ft). Its width will be 360 m (1,180 ft) on the surface and 275 m (902 ft) wide at the bottom.

The largest ship sizes that can pass through the canal were determined as 275–350 meters long, 49 meters wide, draft of 17 meters and an air draft of 58 meters.

	Istanbul Canal	Panama Canal	Suez Canal
Width	275 m	62.5 m	205 m
Length	45 km	80 km	193 km
Beam max	77.5 m	51.2 m	51.2 m

=== Project preparations ===
On September 23, 2010, Hıncal Uluç, a columnist with the daily Sabah, wrote an article named "A Crazy Project from the Prime Minister" without mentioning the content of the project. In this article, Uluç wrote his reaction to his phone call with Prime Minister Erdogan, stating that, "I had the phone in my hand and froze. This is the most crazy project I've ever heard about Istanbul. If anyone would have asked me to come up with thousand projects, it still wouldn't have crossed my mind. It's that crazy." This article led to creating hype around the project, dubbing it the "Crazy Project" (Turkish: Çılgın Proje).

It appeared that the Justice and Development Party (AKP) government had started discreet studies on the project earlier and that concrete steps were taken for the revival of this project. The project was mentioned by Minister of Transport Binali Yıldırım in May 2009 at the parliament. On April 27, 2011, the then-prime minister Recep Tayyip Erdoğan officially announced the Kanal İstanbul project during a rally held in connection with the upcoming 2011 general elections

Studies relating to the project were completed within two years. The canal was initially planned to be in service at the latest in 2023, the 100th anniversary of the foundation of the Republic.

On 22 January 2013, the Turkish Government announced that research studies about the canal would commence in May 2013. In April 2013, the first stage of the Kanal İstanbul project, which includes the construction of various network bridges and highways, commenced.

By December 2019, construction had not yet commenced. President Erdoğan indicated that a request for tender for the project would be published in early 2020. Meanwhile, Ekrem İmamoğlu, elected as the mayor of Istanbul in 2019 from the opposition party CHP, is opposed to the project.

In January 2020, the Environment and Urbanization Ministry approved the final version of the Environmental Impact Assessment (EIA) report of the Istanbul Canal project. Construction work is scheduled to begin in mid-2021. The project is expected to take seven years to complete.

=== Construction ===
On June 26, 2021, construction started on Sazlıdere Bridge, which Erdogan also stated was the start of the canal construction.

=== Cost ===
Turkish President Recep Tayyip Erdogan and Istanbul Metropolitan Municipality officials have stated that Istanbul Canal will cost an estimated ₺75 billion (US$10 billion) to build. The central government has put forward a build-operate-transfer model as its main preference, but will use funds from the national budget if needed. Approximately 8,000–10,000 people are expected to be employed during the construction phase of the project, while 500-800 are to be employed during the operational phase.

=== Environmental impact ===
A multidisciplinary evaluation study on Canal Istanbul by a scientific team formed by IMM has been published as a book. The book, edited by Prof. Dr. Naci Görür, Prof. Dr. Derin Orhon and Prof. Dr. Seval Sözen, mainly discussed the environmental impacts of Canal Istanbul and whether these impacts were adequately addressed in the EIA report. The points that are not adequately explained in the EIA report can be summarized as follows:

- The first 16.2 km of the canal will pass through weak alluvial soil prone to liquefaction, creating a risky situation in terms of earthquake effects.
- The risk of destruction of the water resources of the Terkos Dam and the Sazlıdere Dam and salinization of groundwaters was not thoroughly examined.
- Failure to explain in detail how the 53 million m^{3} of bottom sludge to be dredged from Lake Küçükçekmece for the construction of the canal will be disposed of.
- The depth of the canal will not be sufficient for the safe navigation of ships with high draft.
- The Marmara Sea will undergo serious chemical changes such as decreased salinity and increased nitrogen load.
- Loss of flora and fauna in the region after the excavation of the canal.
- Both historical and natural structures such as Yarımburgaz Cave will be destroyed by the canal.
- Historical artifacts, for example Küçükçekmece Bridge, will have to be moved.
- Since the population of Istanbul will increase even more due to the new settlements planned to be established around the canal, it has the potential to increase the risk of loss of life and damage in a possible earthquake.

The Black Sea is 50 cm higher than the Marmara and less salty. Simulations predict that, unlike the Bosphorus, which flows both ways, water would rarely flow north through the canal but almost always south, which would make the top 25m of the Marmara less salty. However the ecosystems of both seas could be affected. The project has been criticized for destroying agricultural and forest land and a walking trail, and potentially contaminating groundwater with salt and increasing flooding. Other environmental criticism includes potential changes to the salinity of Marmara Sea, leading to Istanbul smelling of hydrogen sulfide.

=== Criticism ===
Some critics have stated that Turkey aims to bypass the Montreux Convention Regarding the Regime of the Straits, in order to attain greater autonomy with respect to the passage of military ships (which are limited in number, tonnage, and weaponry) from the Black Sea to the Sea of Marmara.

In 2013, Stratfor characterized the announced US$12 billion construction budget and initial operating date of 2023 as being "not realistic for a project of this magnitude."

The city government of Istanbul and local groups are opposed to the project because it would eliminate Lake Durusu, which is used for a fifth of the city's drinking water, and because they expect it will cause overcrowding as the local population increases. Observers said the plan to charge transit fees to oil and gas tankers is unrealistic, as long as free passage is guaranteed through the Bosporous. However, Article 3 of the Montreux convention does allow sanitary inspections before transiting the Bosphorus, leading to speculation that Turkey might apply lengthy sanitary inspections, making the canal a faster alternative. Along with members of the royal family of Qatar, Berat Albayrak, the former Turkish Minister of Finance and son-in-law of President Erdoğan, purchased property along the route, meaning he would personally benefit financially from the resulting real-estate development. Ekrem Imamoglu, Istanbul's mayor, said that limited financial resources should be used for getting Istanbul ready for an earthquake and solving economic problems, and that all buildings that have an earthquake risk in Istanbul could be rebuilt with Istanbul Canal's budget. According to a survey in Istanbul by MAK, 80.4% of the respondents were against Istanbul Canal project, while only 7.9% supported it.

In April 2021, ten retired Turkish navy admirals were arrested over public criticism of the Istanbul Canal project. The arrests followed a day after a group of 104 senior former navy officials signed an open letter warning that the proposed canal could, by invalidating the Montreux Convention, harm Turkish security.

=== Implications for anticipatory policy-making ===
The project has been described as a 'testing ground for anticipatory policy-making'. Should the world move decisively away from fossil fuels in the coming decades, the problem of traffic congestion in the Bosporus Strait will dissipate, removing one of the justifications for the canal.

== See also ==
- Black Sea trade and economy
- Yavuz Sultan Selim Bridge
- Istanbul Airport
