= Yarımburgaz, Küçükçekmece =

Neighborhood in Küçükçekmece district, Istanbul, Turkey

Coordinates: 41°02′57″N 28°45′08″E

Yarımburgaz is a neighborhood in the Küçükçekmece District on the European side of Istanbul, Turkey. Its population is 8,759 (2024).

== Location ==
The neighborhood is bordered on the north by the Trans-European Motorway, with the Başakşehir District lying on the other side of the highway; on the east by the Küçükçekmece neighborhoods of Atakent and İstasyon; on the south by Lake Küçükçekmece; and on the west by Lake Küçükçekmece and the Avcılar District.

== Name ==
Yarımburgaz means literally "half tower" (Turkish: yarım + burgaz).

== Notable features ==
Because of changes to administrative boundaries in 2008, the archeologically important Yarımburgaz Cave is no longer in Yarımburgaz, but in Altınşehir, Başakşehir.

The Istanbul campus of the Nuclear Energy Research Institute (formerly the Çekmece Nuclear Research and Education Center) is located in Yarımburgaz. Some of its structures are registered historical monuments.

Structures dating from the late Roman-early Byzantine period have been found in excavations on the western bank of Nakkaşdere near Lake Küçükçekmece. On the grounds of the Nuclear Energy Research Institute, structures contemporaneous with the site across Lake Küçükçekmece called Bathonea have been excavated.
