= M34 =

M34 or M-34 may refer to:

== Transportation ==
- M-34 (Michigan highway), a road in the United States of America
- M34 highway (Tajikistan), a road connecting Dushanbe and the Anzob Pass
- M34 (Cape Town), a Metropolitan Route in Cape Town, South Africa
- M34 (Johannesburg), a Metropolitan Route in Johannesburg, South Africa
- M34 (Pretoria), a Metropolitan Route in Pretoria, South Africa
- M34 (Durban), a Metropolitan Route in Durban, South Africa
- HızRay, also known as M34, planned metro line in Istanbul

== Vehicles ==
- Mikulin M-34, the Soviet Union's first indigenous mass-produced liquid-cooled aircraft engine
- M34 2½ ton cargo truck, a variant of the United States Army M35 2½ ton cargo truck
- M34 (keelboat), a French sailboat design

== Other uses ==
- M34 (New York City bus) SBS and M34A (New York City bus) SBS, two New York City Bus routes in Manhattan
- M34 grenade
- M34 cluster bomb
- Messier 34, an open cluster in the constellation Perseus
- Samsung Galaxy M34 5G, an Android-based smartphone
