= Küçükçekmece =

- District and municipality
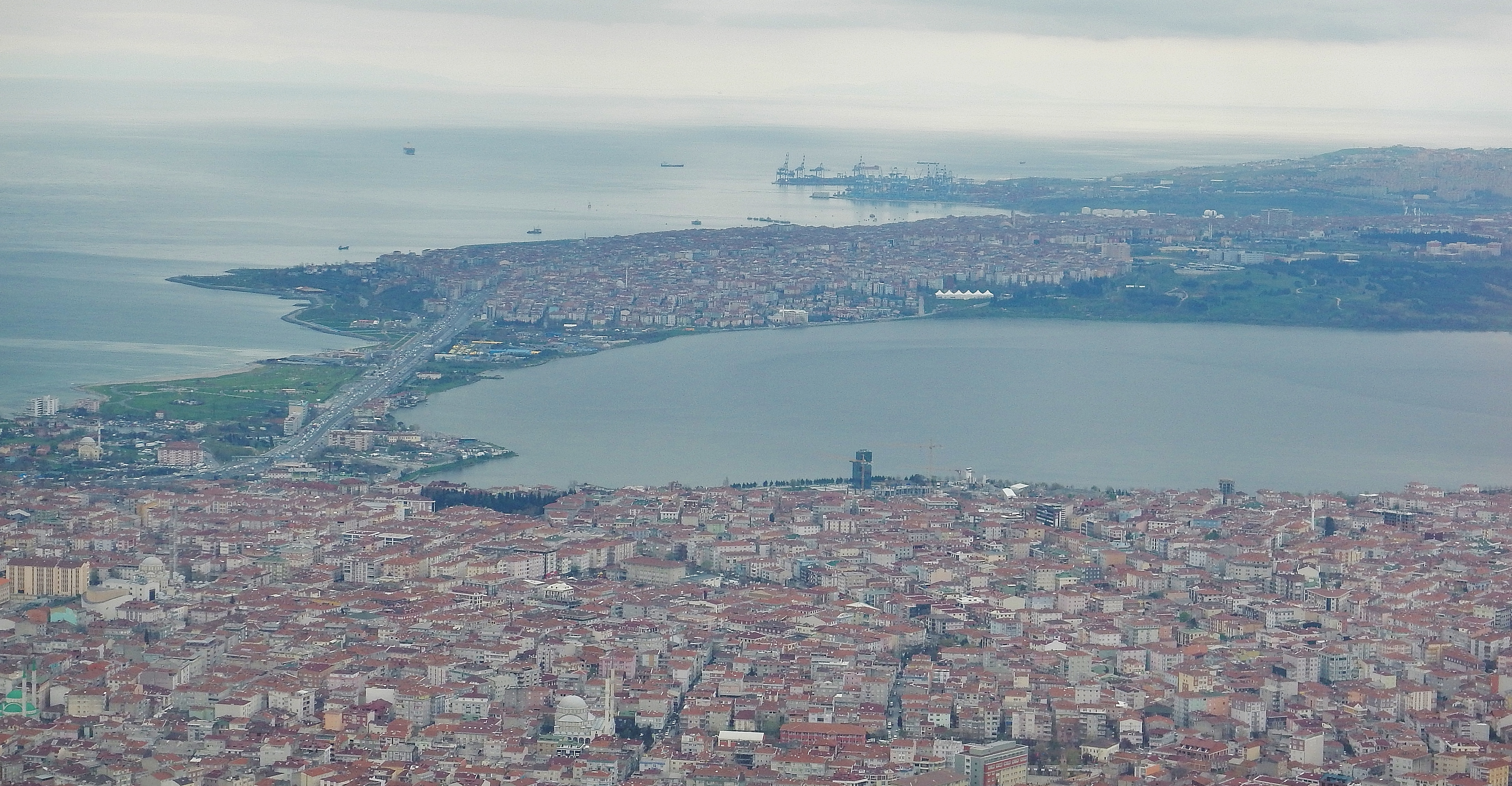
- Aerial view above Cumhuriyet neighborhood lying by the shores of & overlooking the Lake of Küçükçekmece

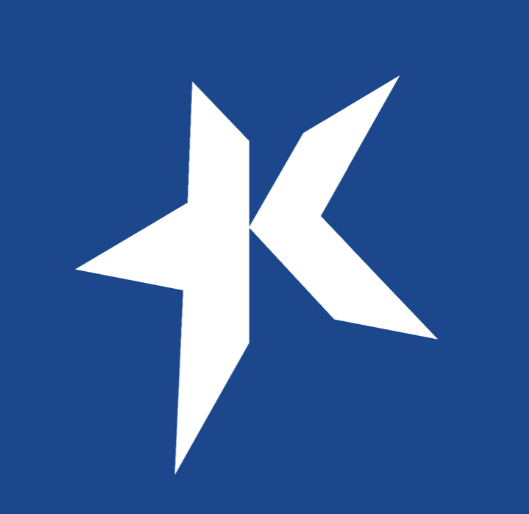
- Logo

- Map showing Küçükçekmece District in Istanbul Province

- Location within Turkey Location within Istanbul
- Coordinates: 41°0′N 28°48′E
- Country: Turkey
- Province: Istanbul

Government
  - Mayor: Kemal Çebi (New Party)
  - Kaymakam: Mustafa Anteplioğlu
- Area: 44 km^{2} (17 sq mi)
- Elevation: 70 m (230 ft)
- Population (2022): 789,033
  - Density: 18,000/km^{2} (46,000/sq mi)
- Time zone: UTC+3 (TRT)
- Postal code: 34290
- Area code: 0212
- Website: www.kucukcekmece.bel.tr

Küçükçekmece (Turkish: [cyˈtʃyc.tʃec.me.dʒe]; meaning "small-drawer", from much earlier Rhegion (Greek: Ρήγιον) and Küçükçökmece as "little breakdown" or "little depression", in more ancient times just as Bathonea), is a municipality and district of Istanbul Province, Turkey. Its area is 44 km^{2}, and its population was 789,033 in 2024. It is 23 kilometers west of the city centre and lies next to Lake Küçükçekmece. Both the lake and land reside on the European shore of the Sea of Marmara. It is the second most populous district of Istanbul.

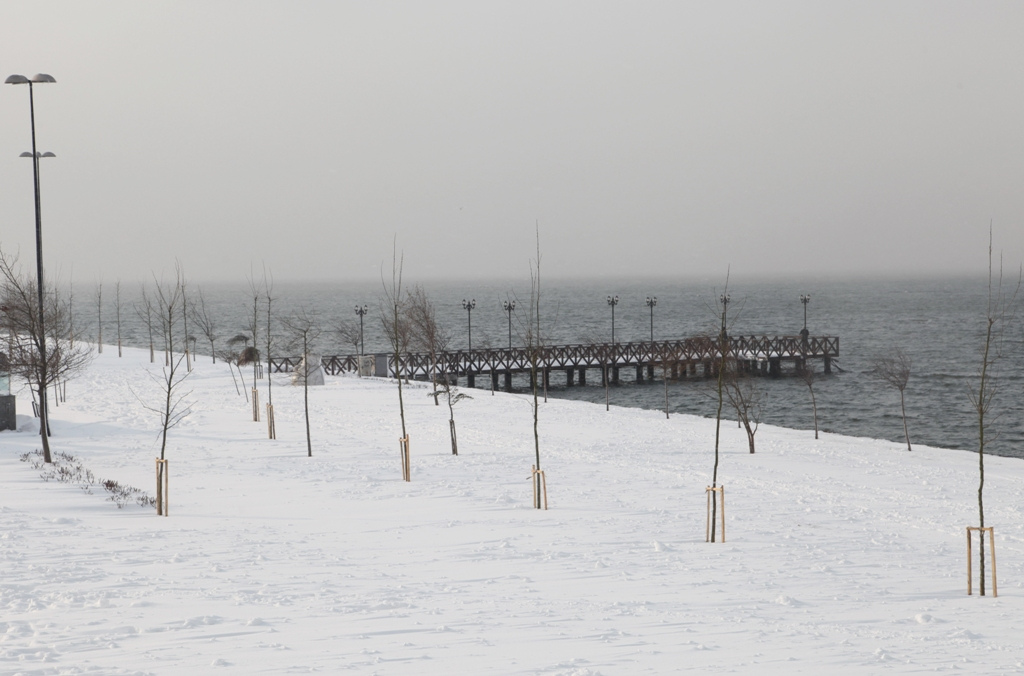
A view of Lake Küçükçekmece in winter

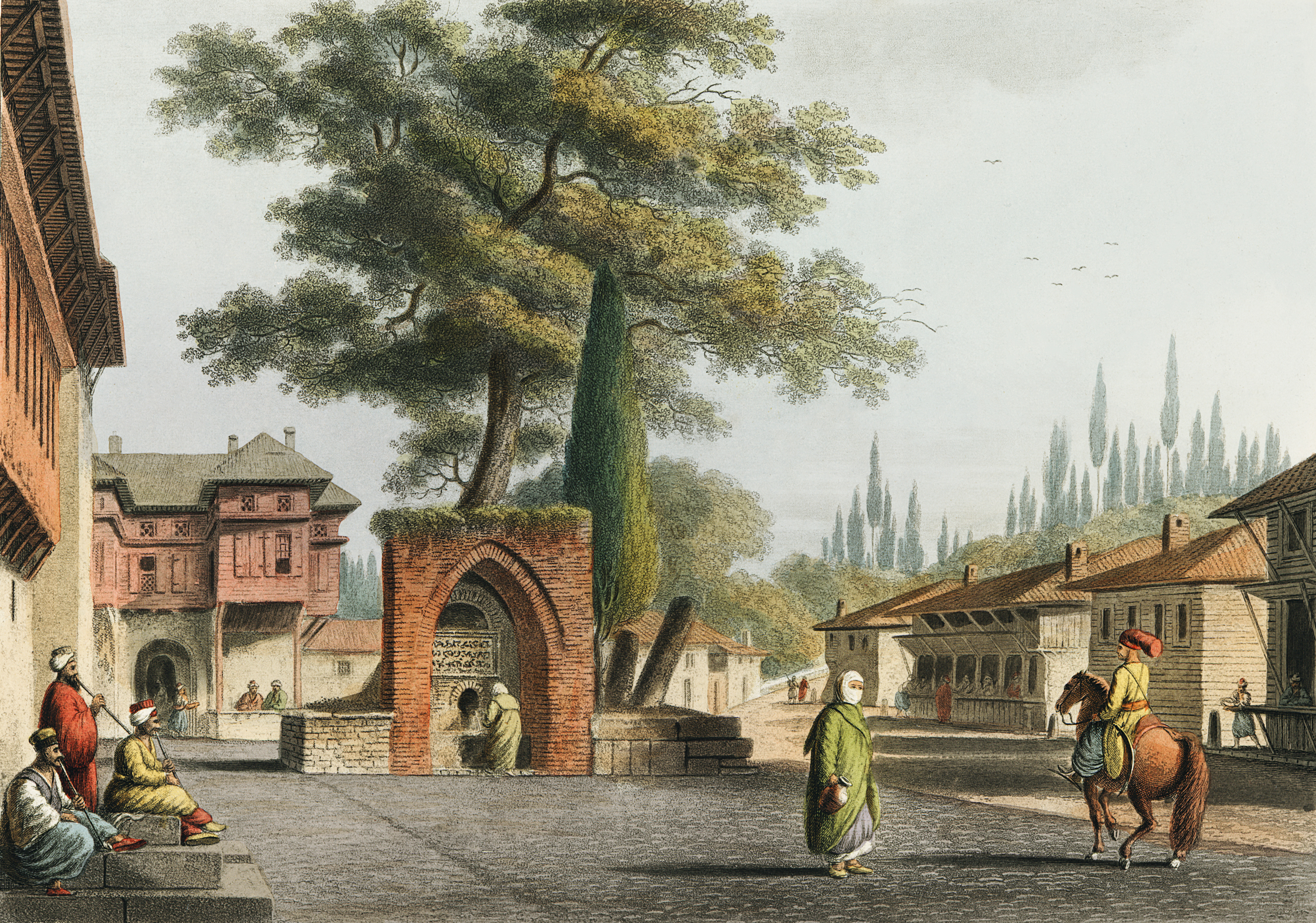
An illustration of the former town by Luigi Mayer, 1700s

== History ==
The area was known as Rhégion in antiquity. The lagoon has almost always been controlled by the same imperial power in control of Istanbul (then Constantinopolis), as the Via Egnatia, the road from Istanbul to Western Europe also passed by here. Küçükçekmece was part of the significant trade route.

According to the Ottoman General Census of 1881/82-1893, the kaza of Küçükçökmece (also referred to as Rhagion by Ottomans back then) had a total population of 17,975, consisting of 10,945 Greeks, 5,340 Muslims, 1,396 Armenians, 61 Catholics, 31 Latins, 15 Bulgarians and 187 foreign citizens in the 1800s, and the population did not see a significant change until the early-mid 1900s.

During the Byzantium and Roman periods the site of Küçükçekmece had also been inhabited. The ruins of this town, which have always remained visible, had been studied extensively in 1930 specially during the Republican era by the Swiss archeologist Ernest Mamboury, who - basing upon ancient sources - identified the settlement with the town of Regium (Ρήγιον in Greek). In 2009 a new identification has been proposed, this time with the small Roman and Byzantine village of Bathonea, which was home to Viking settlers, specifically Varangians and Varangian Guards. Many artifacts, such as Norse Crosses rather than Orthodox ones belonging to the Vikings were found.

The settlement was likely once only made up of the small village of Bathonea, to later turn into the town of Rhagion or also Küçükçökmece, and later as the Küçükçekmece we know today around the 30s.

=== Küçükçekmece today and in the future ===
The population of Küçükçekmece is growing, and new schools, supermarkets, parks, shopping centres, modern living spaces, cultural centers and other facilities are rapidly being built, and an ongoing metro-line construction which will connect from Bağcılar, Kirazlı to a new Halkalı metro.

Alongside 9 other metro constructions all around İstanbul, Istanbul has the highest amount of metros being constructed in a city in the world, construction being carried out by the İBB (Istanbul Municipality).

Many residential areas in certain districts were gecekondu neighbourhoods, illegally built quasi-slums typical of old working-class Istanbul. The remaining lot of these are being gradually replaced by large housing projects, or "Kentleşme, Kentsel Dönüşüm projeleri" in Turkish.

Küçükçekmece, along with Başakşehir, Bağcılar, Gaziosmanpaşa, Esenler, Bayrampaşa, Zeytinburnu, and Fatih, are home to many refugees of Middle Eastern origin, especially urban areas around the Küçükçekmece Lake.

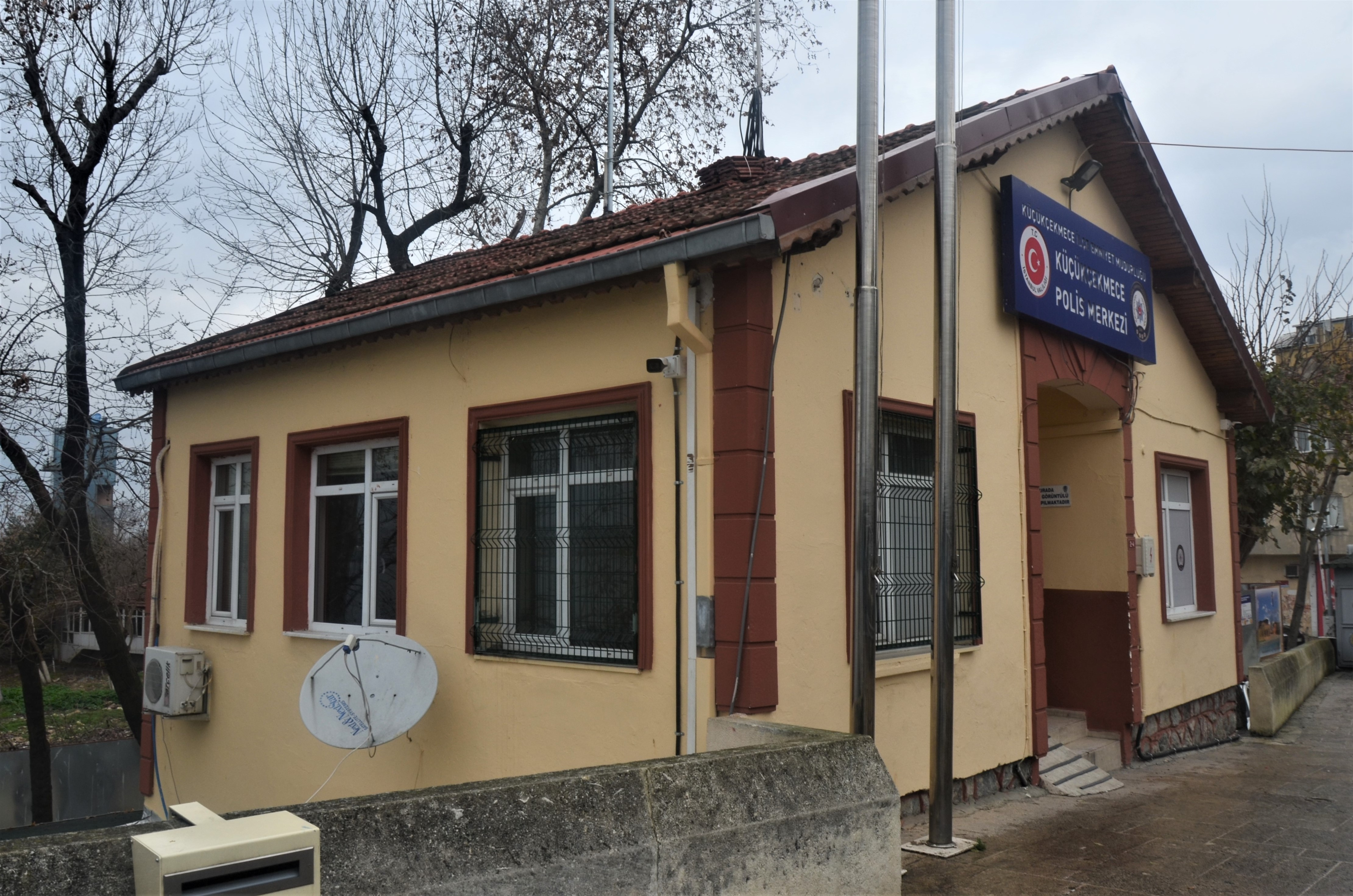
An old small local sheriff's office in the town, by the historic bridge

== Geography ==
The settlement lies 20 km west from Istanbul. The district is eight kilometers wide, reaching a small inlet west of Istanbul on the banks of Lake Küçükçekmece. The land here is flat, rising very gently away from the sea shore and lake shore, and as such is easily built upon. This has historically encouraged, and still encourages further growth and development in the area. Future growth and development is expected in the municipality.

Though, some parts of the land right around the edges reaching to the lake are man-made and also build upon, making it risky for old buildings or building vulnerable for earthquakes to be built there, but the Küçükçekmece Municipality and Istanbul Metropolitan Municipality closely monitor development around the region as part of their ongoing "Earthquake-proof Istanbul" program.

The government-based TOKİ development project in the 2000s started mostly focused on this region, thus many TOKİ buildings are present, and even today some are being built alongside the private-firm urban projects.

It is quite an ideal flat land, but is affected by earthquakes due to being near the North Anatolian fault, and earthquakes are felt aggressively in most cases.

Buildings built and being built there today are quite modern and earthquake-proof, as they are obligated to be built as such by law. Old buildings, damaged buildings, and gecekondu buildings are demolished safely by either the Istanbul Metropolitan Municipality, Küçükçekmece Municipality on the behalf of ministries involved, or the ministries themselves.

=== Location ===
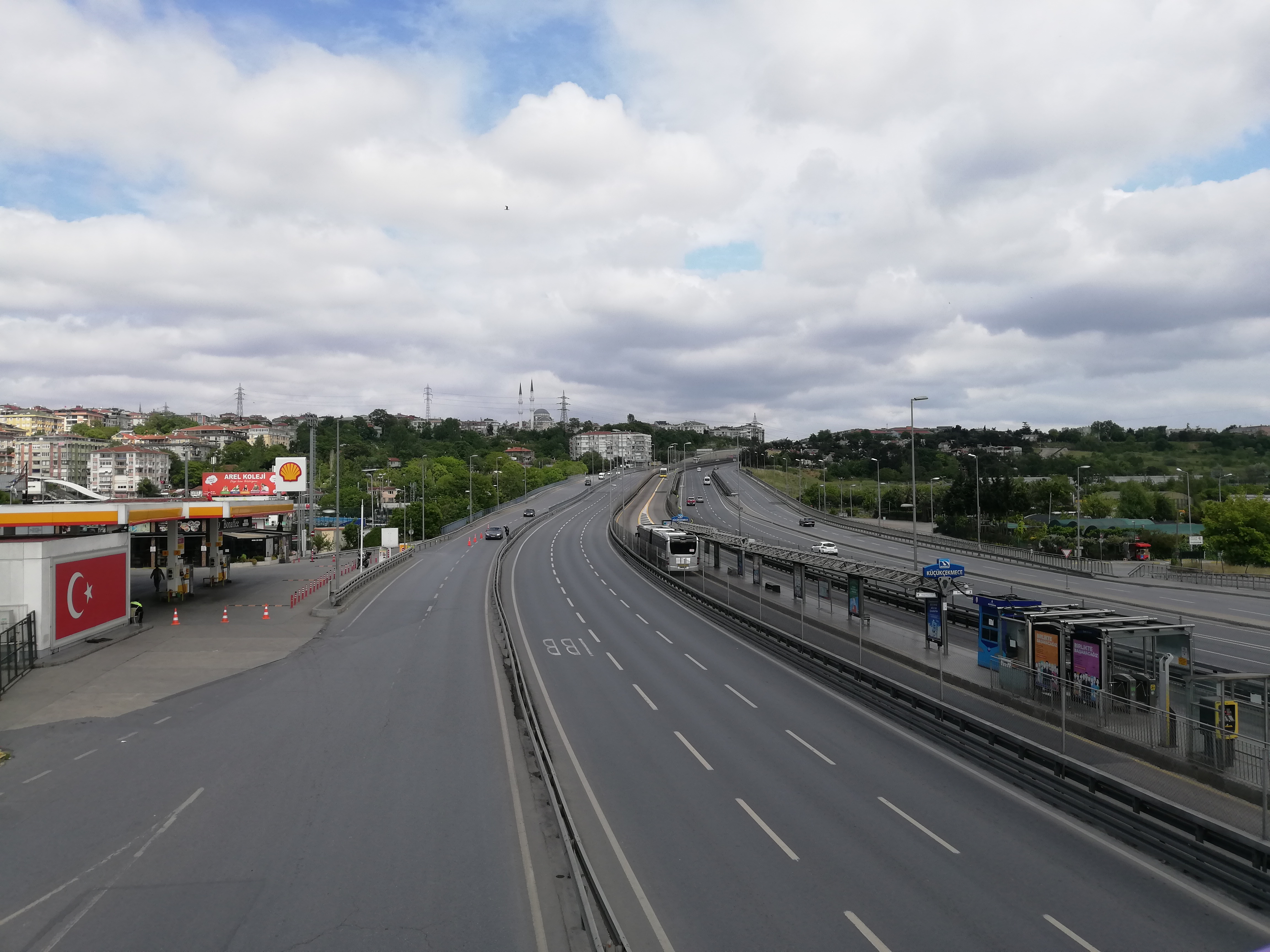
The D.100 highway during the COVID-19 lockdown

Küçükçekmece lies on the European shore of the Sea of Marmara, settled on a lagoon named Lake Küçükçekmece. Across the inlet is the district of Avcılar and the campus of Istanbul University. The inlet is connected to the Sea of Marmara by a very narrow channel, therefore the water has low salinity.

The EU80/TEM, D.100 (Part of EU80) & E3 highways and motorways pass through this municipality, connecting to the rest of Europe and Turkey, making the highways a very significant economic and cargo route.

== Composition ==
There are 21 neighbourhoods in Küçükçekmece District:

- Atakent
- Atatürk
- Beşyol
- Cennet
- Cumhuriyet
- Fatih
- Fevzi Çakmak
- Gültepe
- Halkalı Merkez
- İnönü
- İstasyon
- Kanarya
- Kartaltepe
- Kemalpaşa
- Mehmet Akif
- Söğütlü Çeşme
- Sultan Murat
- Tevfikbey
- Yarımburgaz
- Yeni Mahalle
- Yeşilova

Atakent is the most populous neighbourhood, with 102,682 inhabitants (2022).

== Places of interest and attractions ==
The Küçükçekmece Bridge, also known as the Küçükçekmece Mimar Sinan Bridge, is a historic stone arch bridge built by famous Ottoman architect Mimar Sinan in the 1500s, which crosses the mouth of the lagoon. The bridge has been restored and is well-maintained.

The Mehmet Arsay Klasik Automobile Museum is a classic automobile museum in the Atatürk neighborhood of Küçükçekmece, opened in the 1900s featuring many classic well-maintained and polished old cars. It is next to the Arena Park AVM, a large shopping center in the heart of the Halkalı district, (and near Atakent) which is also both a top attraction for outsiders and locals in Küçükçekmece. It is easily accessible by bus, bicycles, car, and soon metro. There are many cultural centers, theaters, restaurants, shops and galleries in Küçükçekmece, such as the Atatürk Kültür Merkezi, Cennet Kültür and Art Center, and Sefaköy Cultural Center.

Lake Küçükçekmece and its surrounding area is home to parks, living spaces and institutions around the lakeside, the parks are both for walking and for doing sports outdoors right next to the lake. Picnics are also available around the wide lake.

The Yarımburgaz Caves, although not entirely inside the district, but on the north of Lake Küçükçekmece are pre-historic and ancient 400,000 year old cave settlements, once hosting inhabitants, (Homo erectus) who would later migrate to prehistoric Europe and begin the first footsteps of civilizations in Europe.

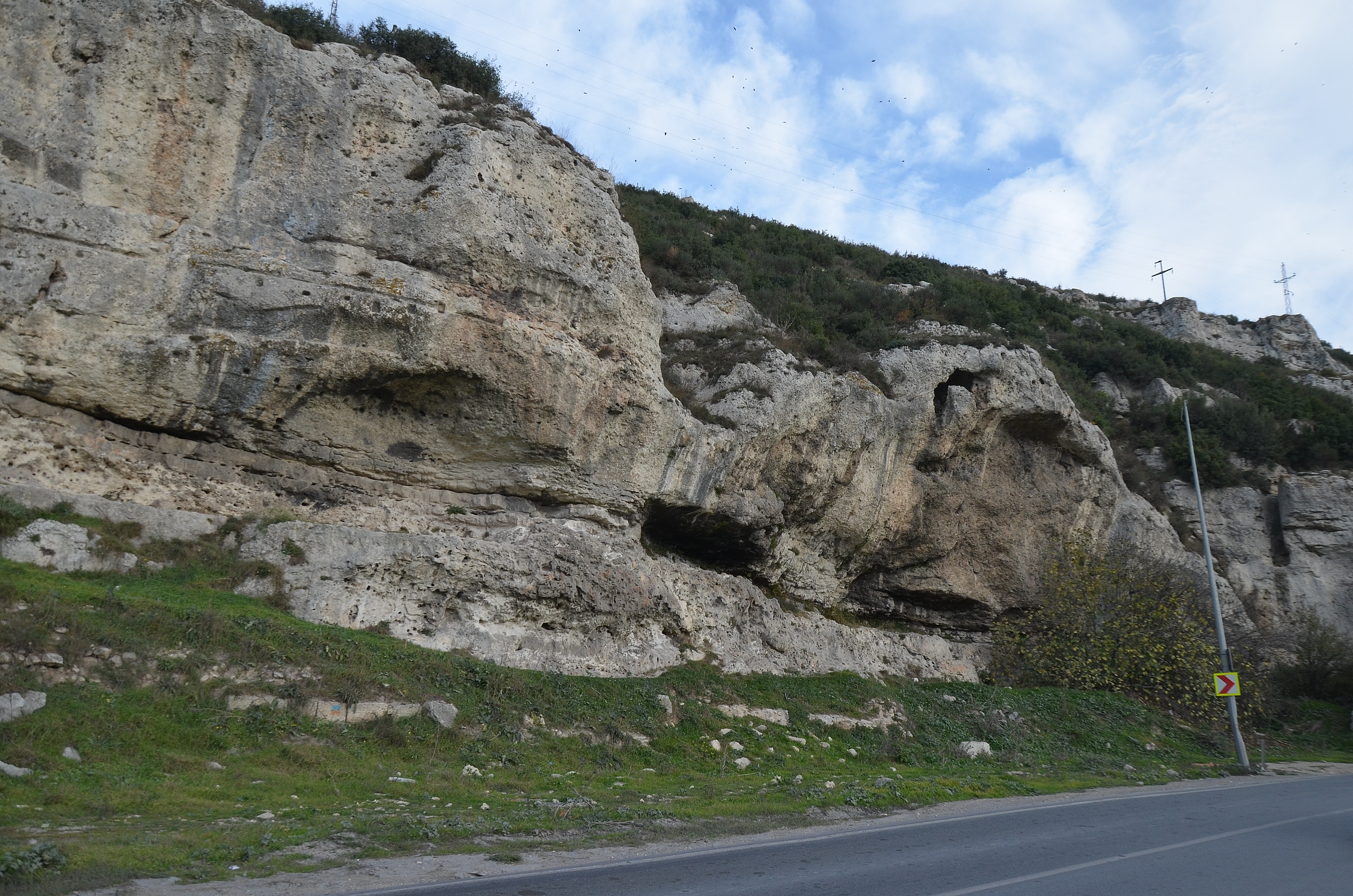
View of some entrances into the caves from the outside

The cave had ancient cave paintings on its walls, and artifacts from the Stone Age. The cave, before there was any proper scientific and archeological research surrounding it, was subject to vandalism, specifically vandalized while being used as a set location in several movies in the 1970s and 1980s. In the 1990s after the cave started gaining global attention, illegal treasure hunters, mostly smuggling into the Middle East and Balkans, started illegal digging in the caves, but the Ministry of Culture stepped in and closed off the site. Today, the maintenance of the cave is questionable, it still has significant archeological and paleontological impact and such research has still been going on there. Some artifacts and other findings from the caves are on display in the Istanbul Archaeology Museums in the Fatih municipality. Most of its parts are closed off to the ordinary public.

The Bathonea Ancient City is a currently active archeological and paleontology site, with ongoing scientific research. Access is only available for certain university students, professionals in the field, scientists, researchers, journalists and professors or can be accessed by others on behalf of a granted permission by the institution under the Kocaeli University. Known as the "Viking Neighbourhood of Ancient Istanbul".

== Sports and culture ==
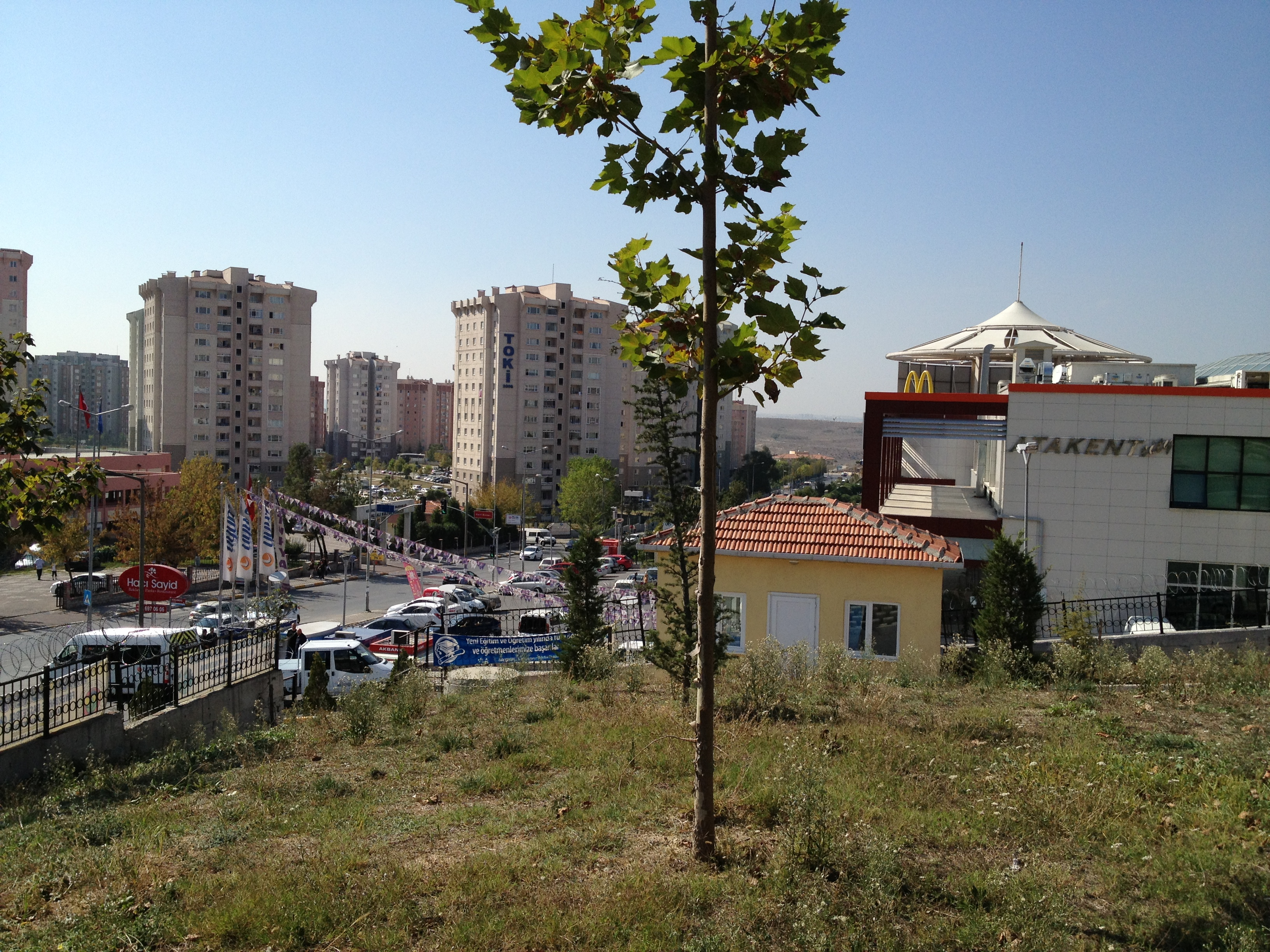
Central Atakent neighborhood

The 1911-founded football club Küçükçekmece S.K. plays in the Istanbul First Amateur League, there are many more clubs and teams in many different sports field based in and representing the Küçükçekmece region.

Other than those clubs and teams, such as many private colleges, schools, organizations and such have their own sports teams in all fields which can and play in their own or differ clubs, teams, matches from women's sports to men's sports, which also includes and is available for the younger children. Matches are hosted across many available spaces such as in private or public, indoors or outdoors sports fields, centers, and schools. (Which also can be the hosts on the behalf of the played games.)

There is also a newly built (by membership) Esports center, gaming/cosplay events, events similar to VidCon and ComiCon can also be hosted there. The opening and hosting was done by Mayor Kemal Çebi, İstanbul Mayor İmamoğlu, and several internet personalities (mainly Twitch streamers) that were invited and present.

Most prominent fields are the basketball, volleyball, football, and swimming fields.

== Transportation ==
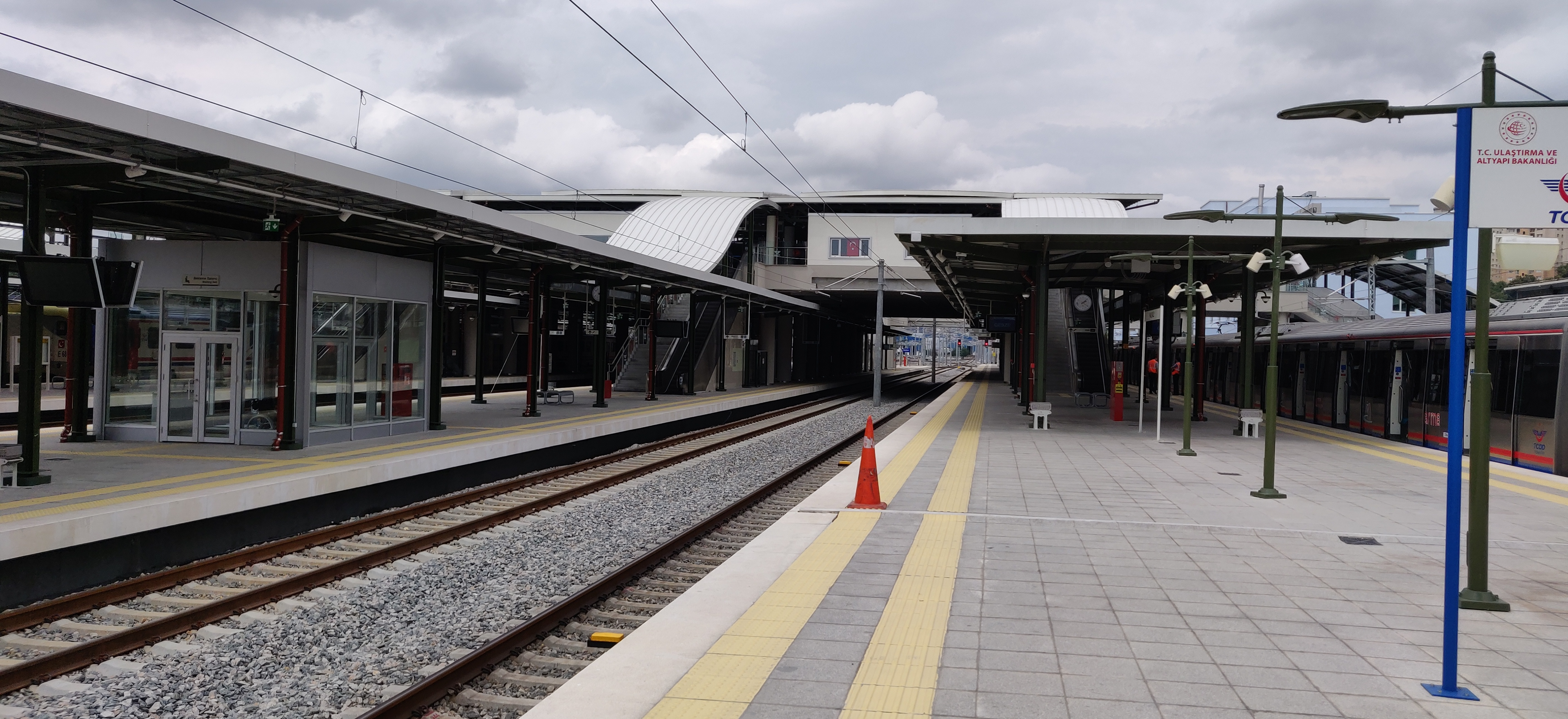
View of the Halkalı Marmaray railway/train station to the north

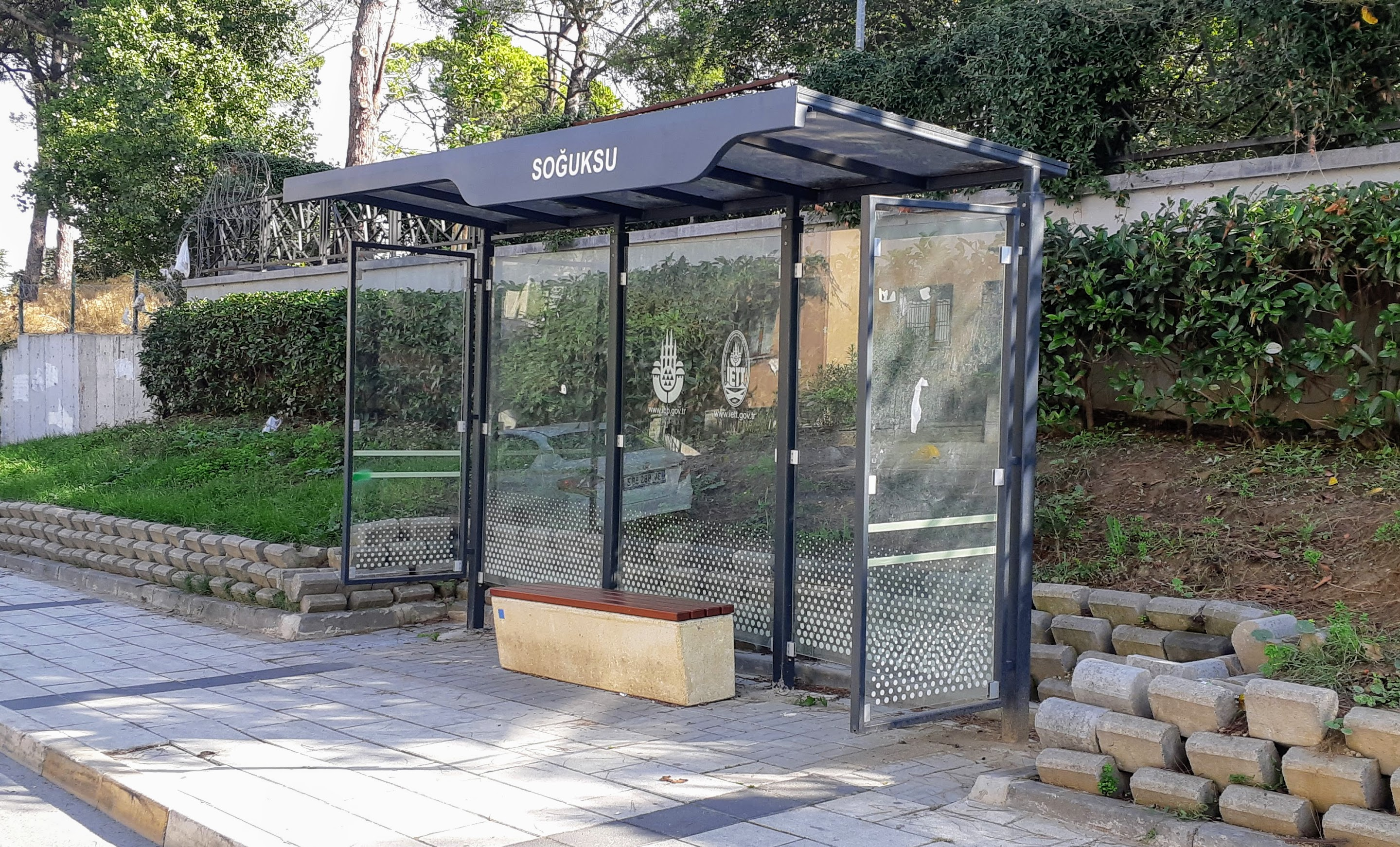
A bus stop at the Soğuksu neighborhood

Other than significant highways and significant roads that pass through the municipality, there is the Marmaray commuter rail line that also passes through Küçükçekmece and serves the railway stations; Küçükçekmece, Mustafa Kemal, and Halkalı. An ongoing metro-line extension of M1B will connect from Bağcılar, Kirazlı to Halkalı and the planned HızRay (M34) will pass through Küçükçekmece.

Public transportation is widely used in the municipality, especially among the students and elderly. Traffic can be an issue at entry/rush hours in the early mornings, specially on school and work days. Exit hours are rather calmer in the municipality.

== International relations ==
Küçükçekmece has a cultural, economic and educational cooperation agreement with Józsefváros (Budapest District VIII), Hungary, which was signed in 2015.

== See also ==
- Büyükçekmece
- Bakırköy

== Sources ==
- Mamboury, Ernest (1953). The Tourists' Istanbul. Istanbul: (Çituri Biraderler Basımevi).
