= HızRay =

Transit line in the largest city of Turkey

HızRay M34 (Beylikdüzü – Sabiha Gökçen Airport) Fast Metro Line

Overview
- Status: In planning phase
- Line number: M34
- Locale: Istanbul, Turkey
- Stations: 13

Service
- Type: Rapid transit
- System: Istanbul Metro
- Operator: Metro Istanbul

History
- Planned opening: 15 May 2028

Technical
- Line length: 74.5 km (46.3 mi)
- Number of tracks: 2
- Operating speed: 140 km/h (87 mph)

HızRay (lit. 'SpeedRail') or M34 is a 74.5 km long planned line of the Istanbul Metro to be constructed in the east–west direction of Istanbul, and is currently undergoing feasibility tests by the Istanbul Metropolitan Municipality.

The line was proposed by Ekrem İmamoğlu, the Mayor of the Istanbul Metropolitan Municipality, in September 2020. it was initially planned to span 62.8 km with 10 stations, operating at a speed of 160 km/h (which was later reduced to 140 km/h after the revision), and was initially proposed to run between Halkalı on the European side and Sabiha Gökçen Airport on the Anatolian side.

However, during the Raylı Sistemlerde Büyük Hamle (lit. 'Major Leap in Rail Systems') press conference held by Ekrem İmamoğlu on 7 February 2021, it was announced that due to high demand from the Esenyurt and Beylikdüzü districts, the new terminus would be Beylikdüzü, extending to 13 stations, and increasing the length of the line to 74.5 km.

On 9 November 2022, the Istanbul Metropolitan Municipality revealed the updated route of the line, including detailed designs, revisions, and technical specifications for many of the stations.

== Specifications ==
- Owner: Istanbul Metropolitan Municipality
- Operator: Metro Istanbul
- Number of Stations: 13
- Line Length: 74.5 kilometres (46.3 miles)
- Travel Time: 50 minutes
- Type: Express Line
- Operating Speed: 140 km/h (87 mph)
- Commercial Speed: 100 km/h (62 mph)
- Approximate Cost: €4,000,000,000
- Construction Period: 6 years
- Target Completion Date: 2030
- Track Gauge: 1,435 mm (4 ft 8 1/2 in) standard gauge
- Power Supply: 1500/3000V DC overhead line
- Number of tunnel boring machines: 27 (26 units with a radius of 5.7 m, 1 unit with a diameter of 9.6 m)
- Project Designers: Yüksel Proje, Metro Istanbul, Arup, EMAY

== Stations ==
No	Station	District	Transfer	Type	Notes
1	Beylikdüzü	Beylikdüzü	(Beylikdüzü)・ (Beylikdüzü); İETT Bus: Beylikdüzü Bus Station: 76, 76BA, 76C, 76G, 76TM, 144, 144H, 145T, 303A, 400A, 401, 401T, 418, 429A, 448, 458, BM5, ES1, ES3, HT48, HVL2 (Istanbul Airport Bus -HAVAIST)	Underground	Beylikdüzü Square・Marmara Park • Bauhaus Beylikdüzü
2	Nazım Hikmet	Esenyurt	(Nazım Hikmet); İETT Bus: Cumhuriyet Meydanı Bus Station:76D, 142, 142E, 144A, 146, 147, ES1, HS2	Underground	Esenyurt Square
3	Halkalı	Küçükçekmece	・・・ İETT Bus: Halkalı Marmaray Bus Station: 79Y, 89A, 143, BN1, H-3, HVL8 (Istanbul Airport Bus -HAVAIST), MK16, MR40, MR42, MR50, MR51, MR52, MR54	Underground	
4	Kirazlı	Bağcılar	・ İETT Bus: Kirazlı Metro Bus Station:92K, 98K, HT10, MK42	Underground	
5	Otogar	Bayrampaşa	・ İETT Bus: Otogar Bus Station:50R, 76O, 303B	Underground	Esenler Coach Terminal
6	Kağıthane	Kağıthane	・ İETT Bus: Kağıthane Bus Station:41ST, 46Ç, 46T, 48, 48H, 48N, 48T, 50D, 62, 63, 64Ç, 65A, 65G, K1, K2, K3, K4, TM3	Underground	Kâğıthane Creek
7	4. Levent	Şişli	İETT Bus: 4. Levent Metro Bus Station:25G, 27E, 27SE, 27T, 29, 29A, 29B, 29C, 29D, 29E, 29GM, 29P, 29Ş, 36G, 36L, 36Z, 40B, 41, 41A, 41AT, 41E, 41SM, 42, 42M, 48L, 50F, 50Z, 63, 64Ç, 65A, 122H, 122V, 500L, 500T, 59RK, 59RS, 65A, E-3, EL2	Underground	Büyükdere Avenue
8	Ümraniye	Ümraniye	İETT Bus: Ümraniye Metro Bus Station:7, 9A, 10, 11D, 11K, 11P, 11ST, 13, 13B, 13H, 14, 14B, 14DK, 14E, 14ES, 14K, 14YE, 15B, 15TY-2, 19D, 20, 131, 131A, 131B, 131T, 131YS, 131Ü, 138, 138B, 139, 139D, 320, 522, UM13	Underground	
9	Finance Center	Ataşehir	・ İETT Bus: Finans Merkezi Bus Station:13Y, 14BK, 20D, 256	Underground	
10	Mevlana	Ataşehir	İETT Bus: Kemalpaşa Bus Station:11T, 13FY, 14A, 14AK, 14CE, 14S, 14T, 14TM, 14ÇK, 14ŞB, 19D, 19E, 19EK, 19ES, 19S, 19SB, 19V, 320, E-3	Underground	
11	Sancaktepe	Sancaktepe	İETT Bus: Sancaktepe Belediyesi Bus Station:18E, 131B, 131Y, 132YM, AND2K, SM2, SM3, SM13, SM14, UM60	Underground	
12	Kurtköy YHT/Viaport	Pendik	İETT Bus: Dedepaşa Bulvarı Bus Station:130H, 133Ü, 134, UM73	Underground	Kurtköy Depot
13	Sabiha Gökçen Airport	Pendik	İETT Bus: Sabiha Gökçen Havalimanı (Sabiha Gökçen Airport) Bus Station:16S, 122H, 130H, 132H, E-3, E-10, MR60, UM73	Underground	Sabiha Gökçen International Airport
