= Rhegion (Thrace) =

Town of ancient Thrace

- Ῥήγιον (Ancient Greek); Rhegium (Latin)
- 41°00′N 28°48′E
- Type: Town
- Periods: Late Antiquity to Medieval Period
- Cultures: Roman, Greek
- Location: Turkey, Istanbul, Küçükçekmece

Rhegion, also called "Rhagion" or "Rhegium", (Ancient Greek: Ῥήγιον) was a town (sometimes described as a military compound) of ancient Thrace, inhabited during Byzantine times.

== Geography ==
Rhegion was located on the Roman road Via Egnatia. Going east, one would pass through Hebdomon, an imperial suburb adjacent to Constantinople, then reach the Golden Gate (Porte Aurea) before ascending to the Mese. When travelling to the west, the road would ultimately lead to Dyrrachium, modern-day Durrës.

The modern-day location of the site is at Küçükçekmece in European Turkey. Across Lake Küçükçekmece from the site are the ruins of Bathonea.

== History ==
According to Procopius of Caesarea, the stretch between Hebdomon and Rhegion had fallen into disrepair and would become boggy during rainfall. Justinian I paved it with large stone blocks.
