= Küçükçekmece Bridge =

Stone arch bridge in Küçükçekmece district of Istanbul, Turkey

Küçükçekmece Bridge Küçükçekmece Köprüsü
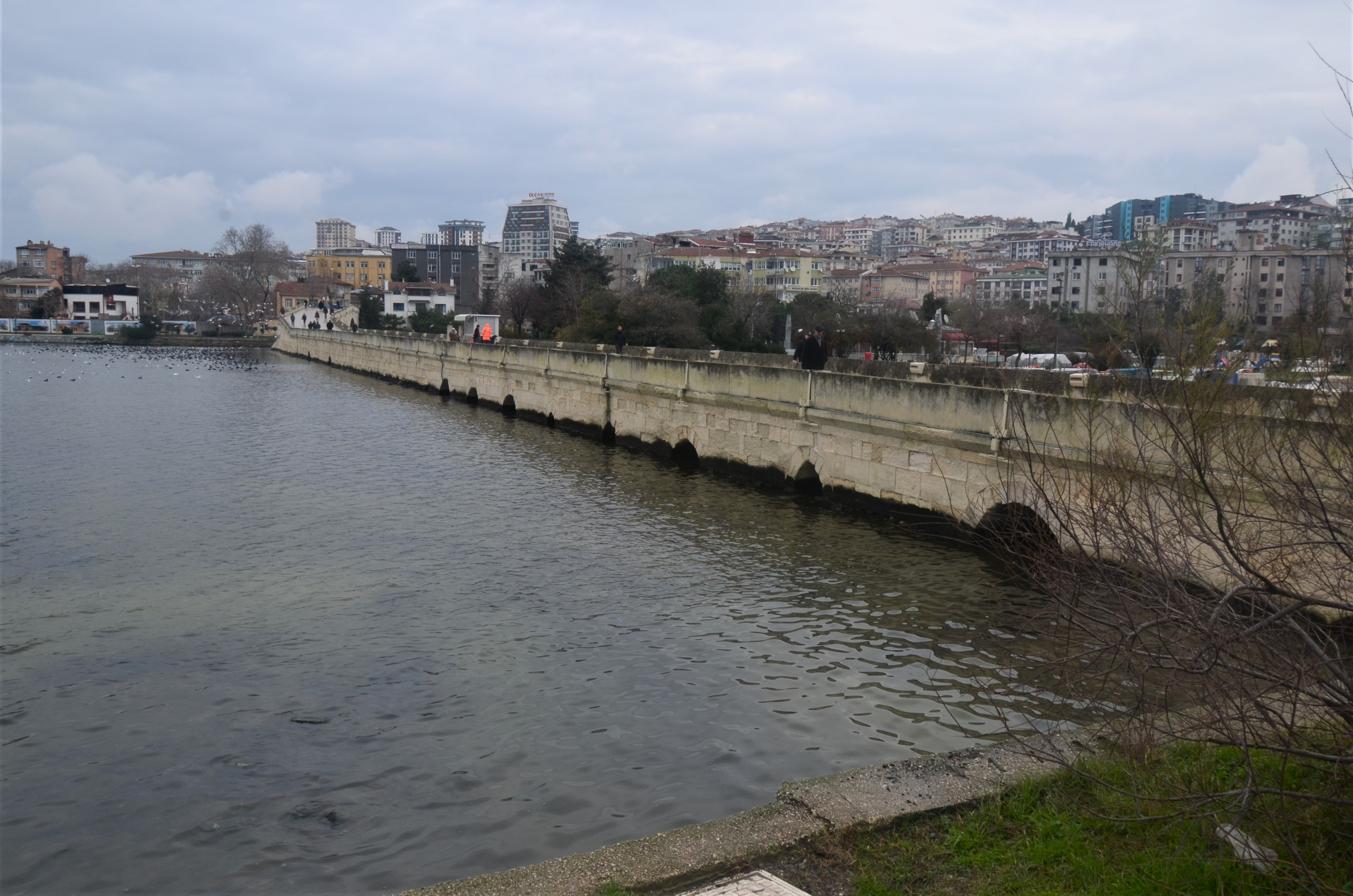
- A view of Küçükçekmece Bridge
- Coordinates: 40°59′20″N 28°46′20″E
- Locale: Küçükçekmece, Istanbul, Turkey

Characteristics
- Material: Stone
- Total length: 227 m (745 ft)
- Width: in average 7 m (23 ft)
- Height: 1.35–8.50 m (4 ft 5 in – 27 ft 11 in)
- No. of spans: 13

History
- Designer: Mimar Sinan
- Construction end: 1560; 465 years ago

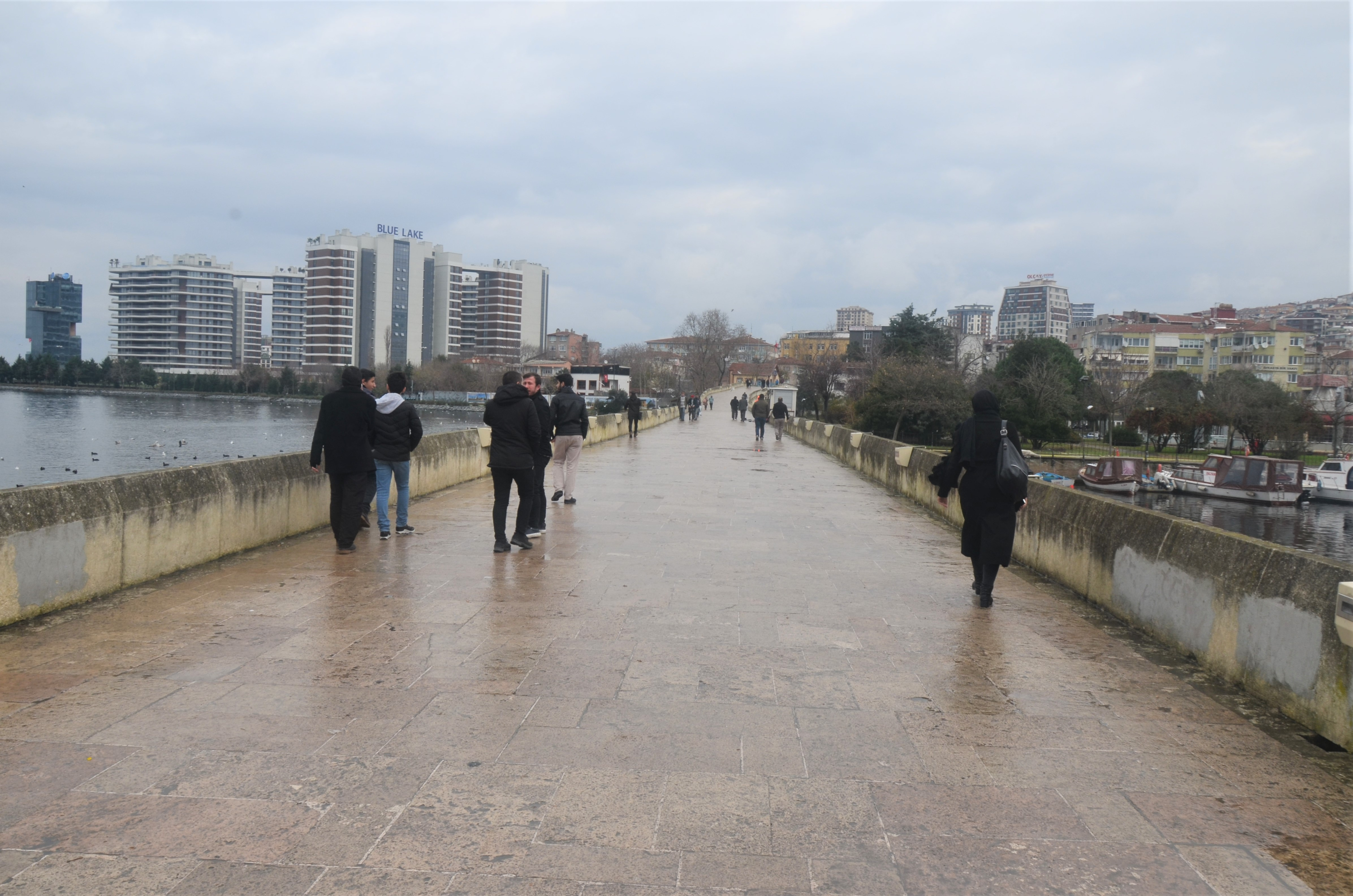
Pedestrians on the bridge.

The Küçükçekmece Bridge (Turkish: Küçükçekmece Köprüsü), also known as the Küçükçekmece Mimar Sinan Bridge, is a stone arch bridge in Küçükçekmece district of Istanbul, Turkey. It was built by Ottoman architect Mimar Sinan and was completed in 1560.

== History ==
A stone bridge, which was built in 558 by Eastern Roman emperor Justinian I (reigned 527–565), stood on the place of the Ottoman bridge. A new masonry bridge was later built on the same place by Byzantine emperor Basil I (r. 867–886). The historic Byzantine bridge was demolished over the time following earthquakes and invasions. The Ottoman bridge was built by the chief architect Mimar Sinan (c. 1488/1490–1588) during the reign of Ottoman Sultan Suleiman the Magnificent (r. 1520–1566).

== Characteristics ==
The Küçükçekmece Bridge is located at southeaster shore of the Lake Küçükçekmece on the mouth of a creek, which flows between the Lake Küçükçekmece and Marmara Sea, and is situated in south-north direction. The stone bridge has 13 arches at 227 m (745 ft) length and is in average 7 m (23 ft) wide. Its height varies between 1.35–8.50 m (4 ft 5 in – 27 ft 11 in). It runs through an islet, which is used as an urban park, in its halfway. The asymmetric bridge's highest place is at north, where the biggest arch is situated as the last arch of the bridge.

== Restorations ==
It underwent restorations in 1735 and 1861. During World War II years, the bridge was widened. In 1996, it was restored by the Metropolitan Municipality within a project approved through the Board of Preservation of Cultural and Natural Assets of Istanbul. Latest restoration of the historic bridge was completed in 2008 after three-year work, which cost ₺ 1.3 million (approx. US$0.85 million). The restoration revealed also that the bridge has 13 arches instead of 12 as known before.
