= Beylikdüzü Belediye (Metrobus) =

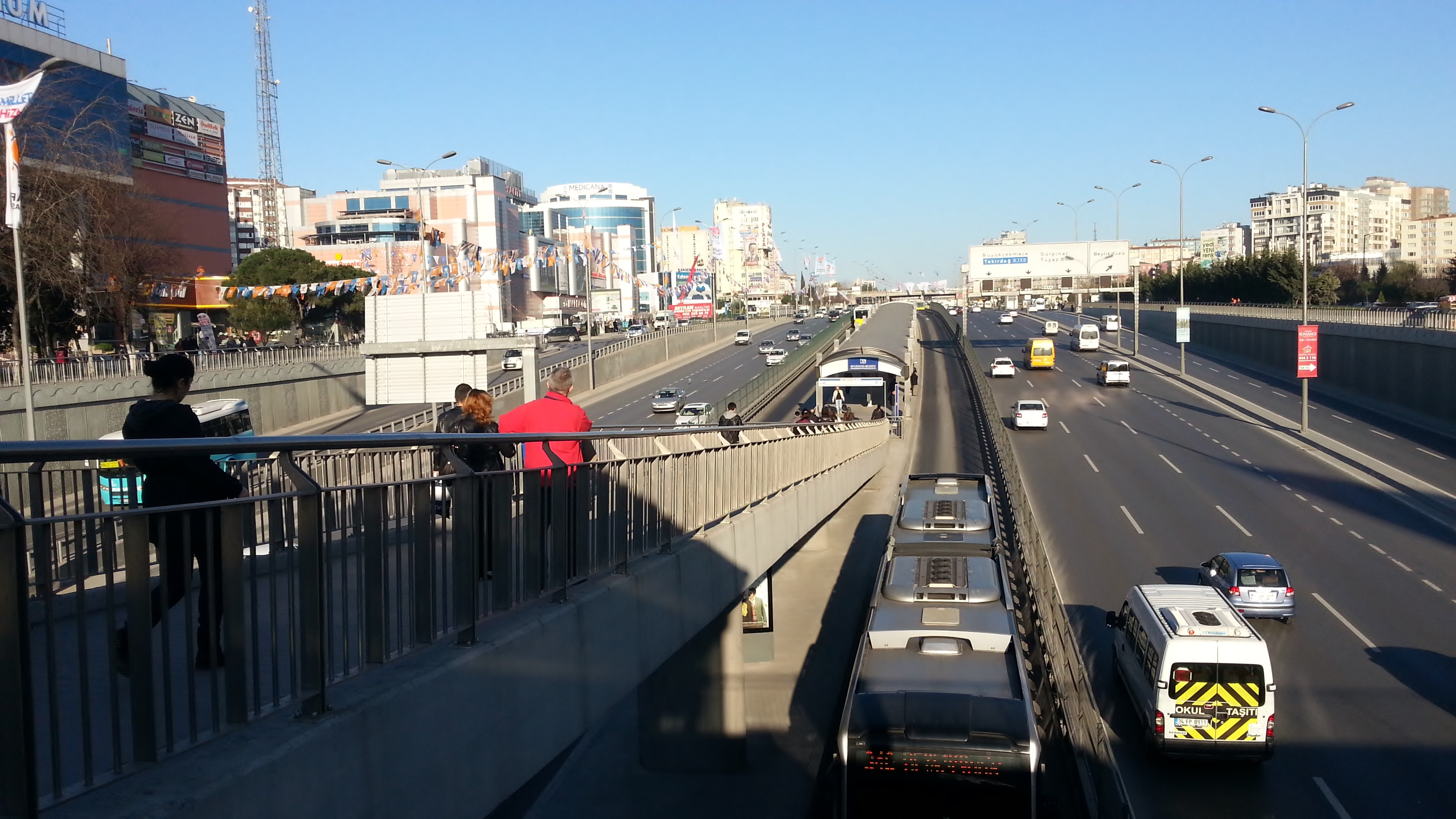
- Looking at the platform from Özgürlük Square.

General information
- Location: Özgürlük Meydanı, Güzelyurt Mah., 34515; Esenyurt/Istanbul; Turkey
- Coordinates: 41.0120°N 28.6506°E
- System: İETT Bus rapid transit station
- Owner: Istanbul Metropolitan Municipality
- Operator: İETT
- Line: Metrobüs
- Platforms: 1 island platform
- Connections: İETT Bus: 76, 76BA, 76C, 76G, 76TM, 144H, 145T, 303A, 400A, 401, 401T, 418, 429, 429A, 448, ES3, HT18, HT4

Other information
- Station code: 41 (IETT)

History
- Opened: 19 July 2012

Services
Preceding station	İETT	Following station
Cumhuriyet Mahallesi towards Beylikdüzü Sondurak	34C	Beylikdüzü towards Cevizlibağ
Cumhuriyet Mahallesi towards Beylikdüzü Sondurak	34BZ	Beylikdüzü towards Zincirlikuyu
Cumhuriyet Mahallesi towards Beylikdüzü Sondurak	34G	Beylikdüzü towards Söğütlüçeşme
Location

Beylikdüzü Belediye is a station on the Istanbul Metrobus Bus rapid transit line. It is located on the D.100 state highway, with the entrance/exit located on Özgürlük Square. The Beylikdüzü Municipality building, from which the station has its name, is located on the south side of the square.

Beylikdüzü Belediye station was opened on 19 July 2012 as part of the westward expansion of the line.
