= Beylikdüzü (Metrobus) =

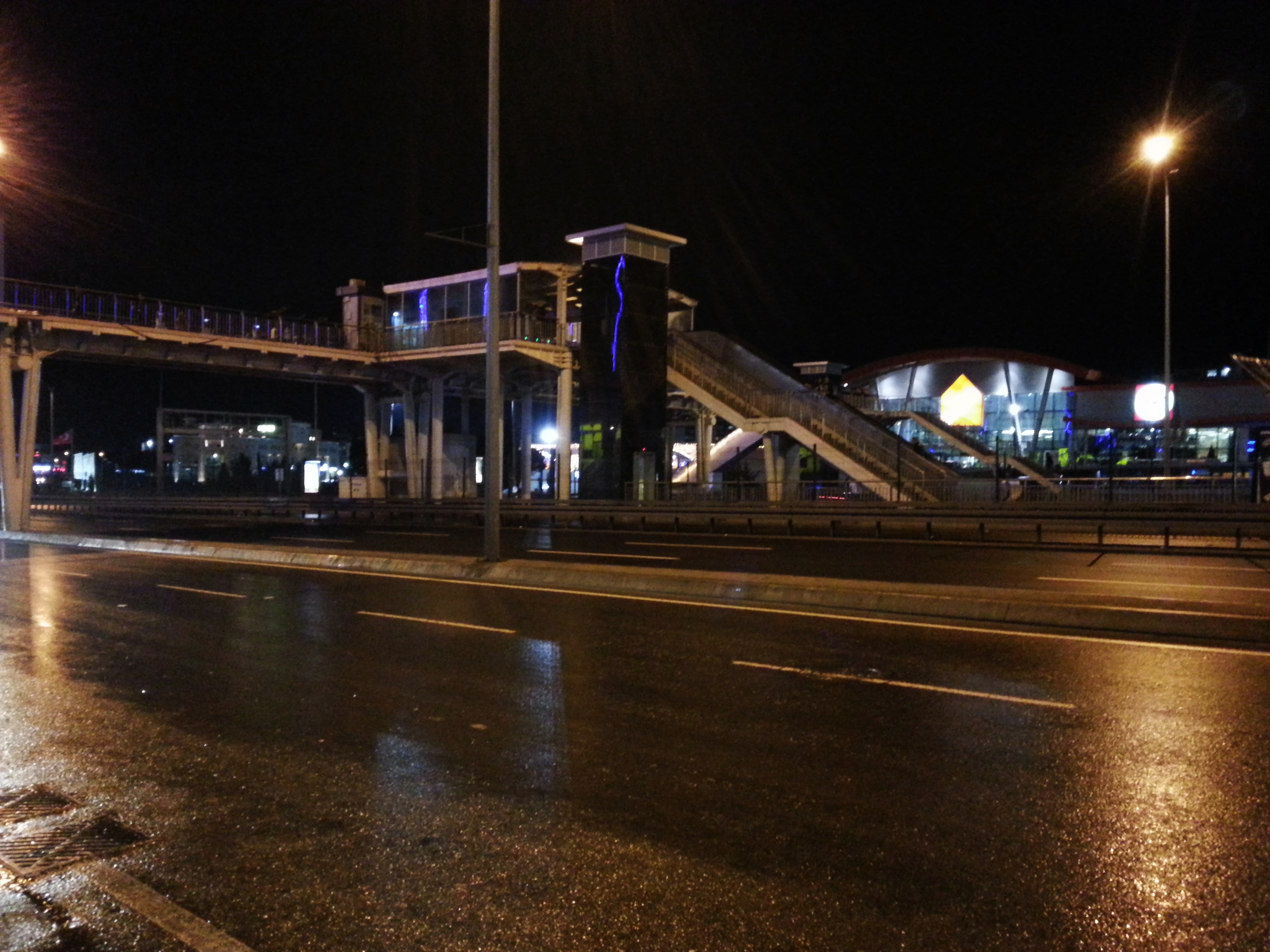

General information
- Location: Güzelyurt Mah., E5, 34515; Esenyurt/Istanbul; Turkey
- Coordinates: 41.009790°N 28.656615°E
- System: İETT Bus rapid transit station
- Owner: Istanbul Metropolitan Municipality
- Operator: İETT
- Line: Metrobüs
- Platforms: 1 island platform
- Connections: İETT Bus: 76, 76BA, 76C, 76G, 76TM, 76Y, 145, 303A, 400A, 401, 401T, 418, 429, 429A, 448, 458, BM4, HT29, HT48

Other information
- Station code: 40 (IETT)

History
- Opened: 19 July 2012

Services
Preceding station	İETT	Following station
Beylikdüzü Belediye towards Beylikdüzü Sondurak	34C	Güzelyurt towards Cevizlibağ
Beylikdüzü Belediye towards Beylikdüzü Sondurak	34BZ	Güzelyurt towards Zincirlikuyu
Beylikdüzü Belediye towards Beylikdüzü Sondurak	34G	Güzelyurt towards Söğütlüçeşme
Location

Beylikdüzü is a station on the Istanbul Metrobus Bus rapid transit line. It is located on the D.100 state highway, with entrances/exits on both sides of the road.

Beylikdüzü station was opened on 19 July 2012 as part of the westward expansion of the line.
