= Naci Görür =

Turkish seismologist

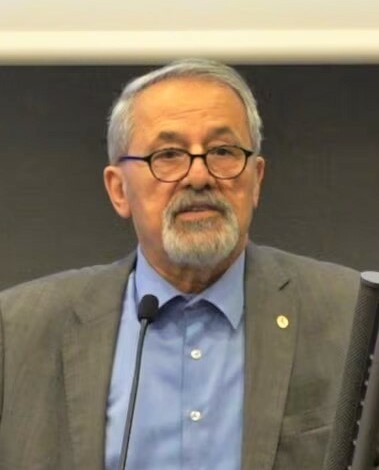
- Born: 9 September 1947 (age 78); Elazığ, Turkey
- Education: Istanbul Technical University; Imperial College London

Naci Görür (born 9 September 1947) is a Turkish seismologist, geologist, and a former professor at the Istanbul Technical University.

== Early life and education ==
Görür was born in Elazığ, Turkey. In 1966, he attended a geology program at a university in Istanbul. He worked as an assistant at the Istanbul Technical University until 1973. He earned his doctorate from Imperial College London.

== Academic career ==
Görür returned to Turkey in 1978. He became an associate professor and then professor at Istanbul Technical University, in 1983 and 1989 respectively. Between 1997 and 2000, he served as the dean of the Faculty of Mining.

An expert in sedimentology and marine geology, he conducted research on Turkey's sedimentary basins, tectonics and seas. His most well-known works were conducted based on the Marmara Sea.

He received the Science for Peace and Security Award (NATO Science Award) at the NATO Summit held in Istanbul in 2004.
