= Sancaktepe station =

Station of the Istanbul Metro

Sancaktepe
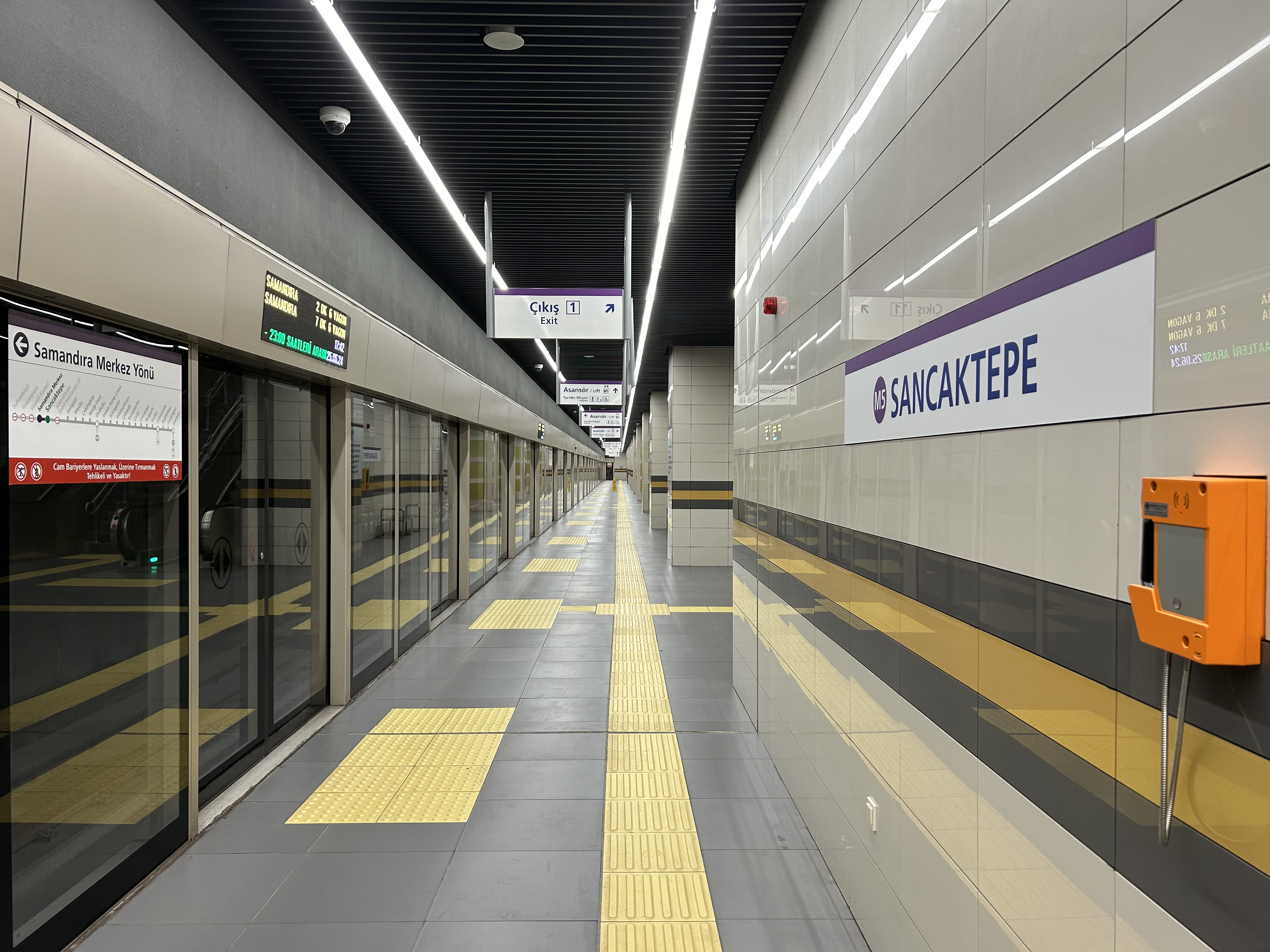
- Platform

General information
- Location: Abdurrahmangazi Neighborhood, Sevenler Street, Sancaktepe Meydan Park, 34791; Sancaktepe, Istanbul; Turkey
- Coordinates: 40°59′32″N 29°13′44″E
- System: Istanbul Metro rapid transit station
- Owner: Istanbul Metropolitan Municipality
- Operator: Istanbul Metro
- Line: M5
- Platforms: 1 Island platform
- Tracks: 2
- Connections: İETT Bus: Samandıra Kız Anadolu IHL: 11SA, 11ÜS, 122H, 122V, 131, 131A, 131B, 131H, 131H, 131Ü, 131V, 131Y, 132M, 132N, 132S, 132SB, 132YB, 132YM, 132ÇK, 14S, 18E,18F, 18UK, 18Ü, 18Y, 18V, 19SB, 19V, 320A, 522ST, KM70, UM60, UM73; Sancaktepe Municipality: 18E, 131B, 131Y, 132YM, UM60; Istanbul Minibus: Kartal - Merve Mahallesi

Construction
- Structure type: Underground
- Parking: No
- Cycle facilities: Yes
- Accessible: Yes

History
- Opened: 16 March 2024 (2 years ago)
- Electrified: 1,500 V DC Overhead line

Services
Preceding station	Istanbul Metro	Following station
Sancaktepe Şehir Hastanesi towards Üsküdar	M5 Line	Samandıra Merkez towards Sultanbeyli
Location

Sancaktepe is an underground station on the M5 line of the Istanbul Metro. It is located under Sevenler Street at Sancaktepe Meydan Park in the Abdurrahmangazi neighborhood of Sancaktepe. It was opened on 16 March 2024 with the M5 line extension from Çekmeköy to Samandıra Merkez.

== History ==
The Çekmeköy - Sultanbeyli Metro Line Second TBM Excavation Ceremony was held on 15 January 2021 for TBM-2 at this station, which started excavation during January 2021 from Sancaktepe to Çekmeköy. On 18 January 2022, TBM-3 started its excavation from Sancaktepe to Veysel Karani. At the same time as TBM-3, TBM-1 reached the TBM shaft between Meclis and Çekmeköy and completed its excavation.

== Station layout ==
Platform level	Westbound	← toward Üsküdar (Sancaktepe Şehir Hastanesi)
Platform level	Island platform, doors will open on the left
Platform level	Eastbound	toward Sultanbeyli (Samandıra Merkez) →

== Operation information ==
The line operates between 06:00 and 00:00 with a train frequency of 4 minutes and 40 seconds during peak hours and 7 minutes at all other times. The line also operates night metro services between 00:00 and 06:00 on Saturdays and Sundays, with trains running every 30 minutes. This provides 66 hours of uninterrupted service between Friday and Sunday. During these hours, fares are charged at double the price. During this time, only Entrance 1 is open at this station.

== Gallery ==
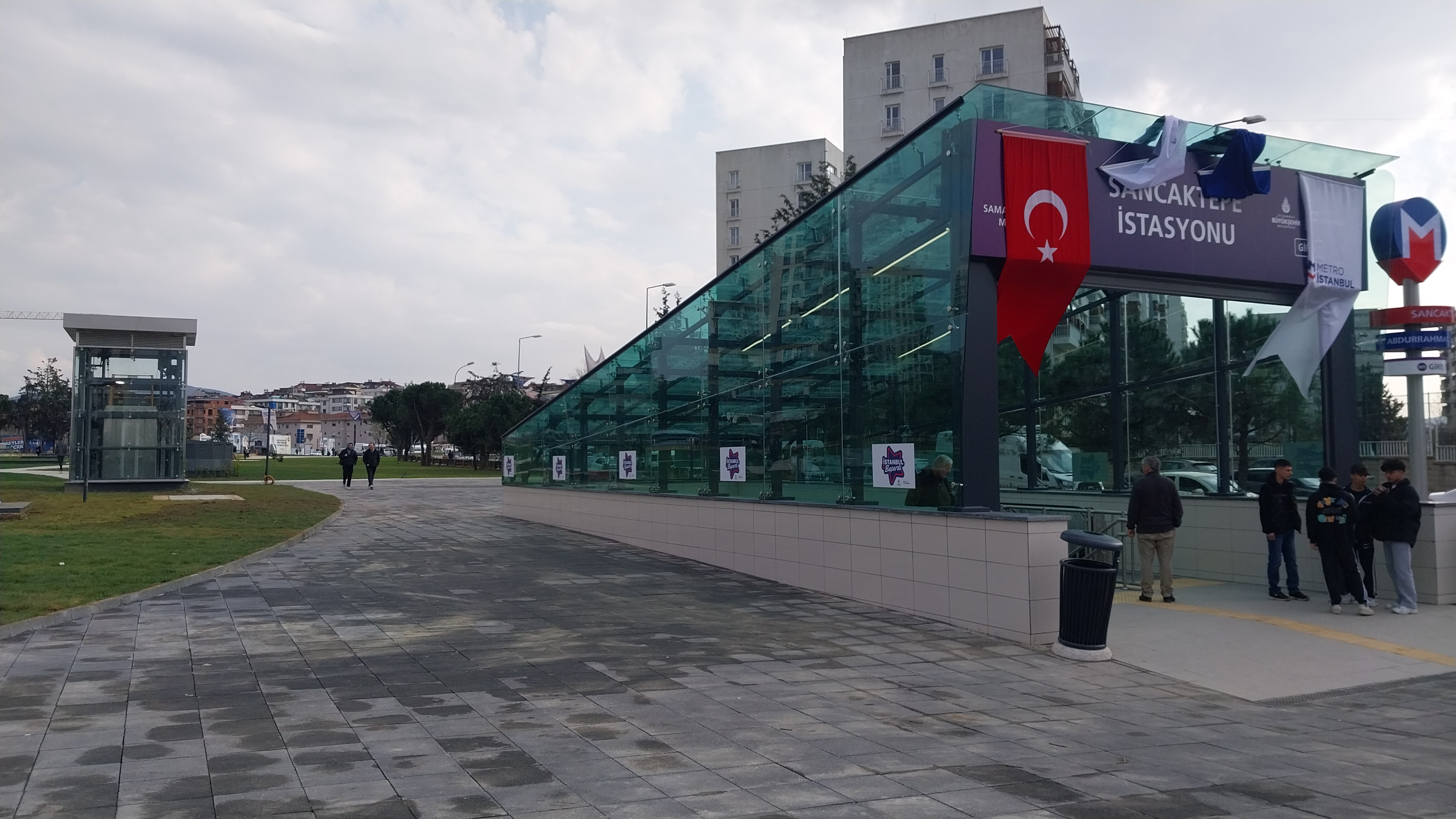
Entrance structure

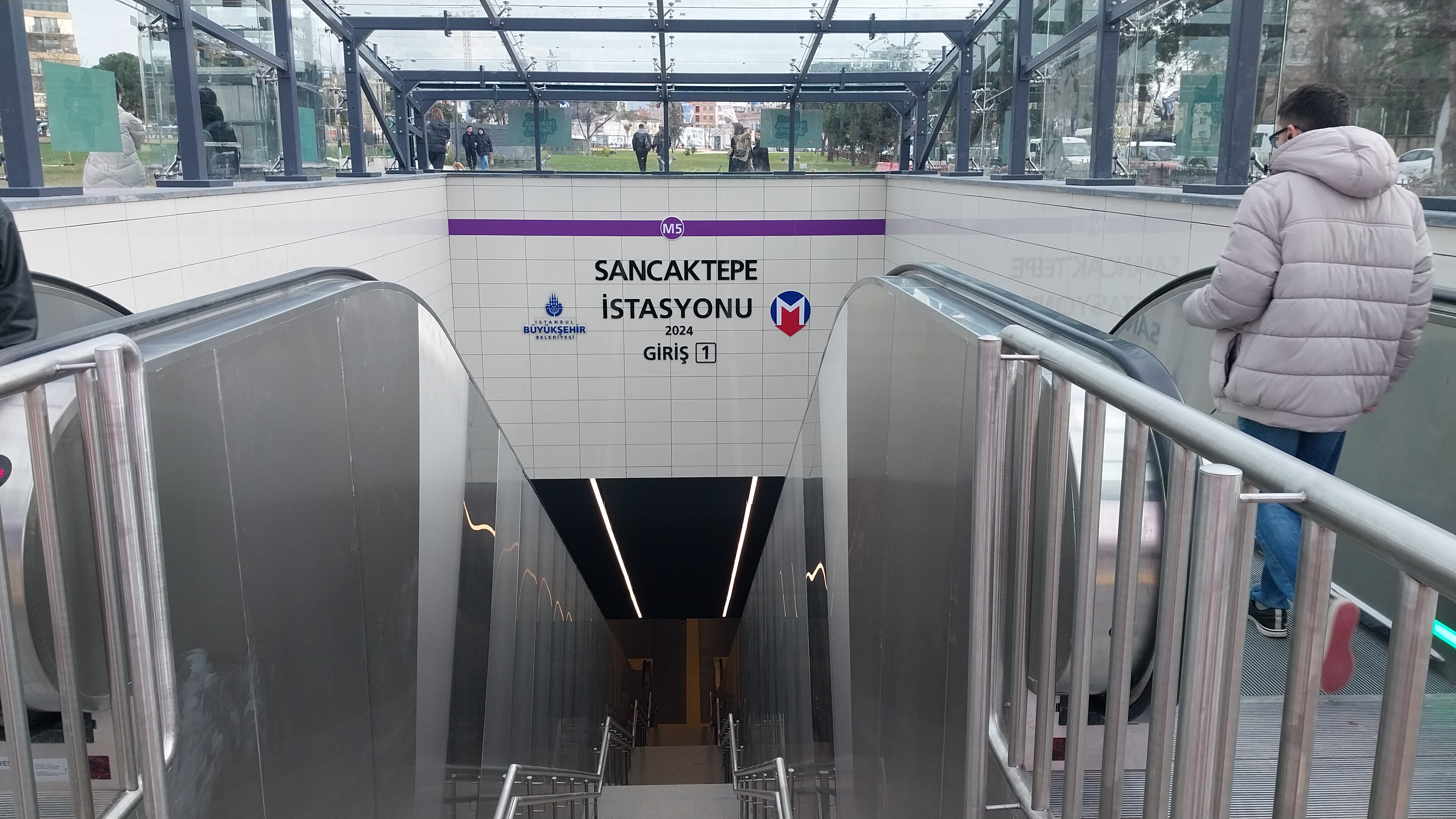
Entrance 1

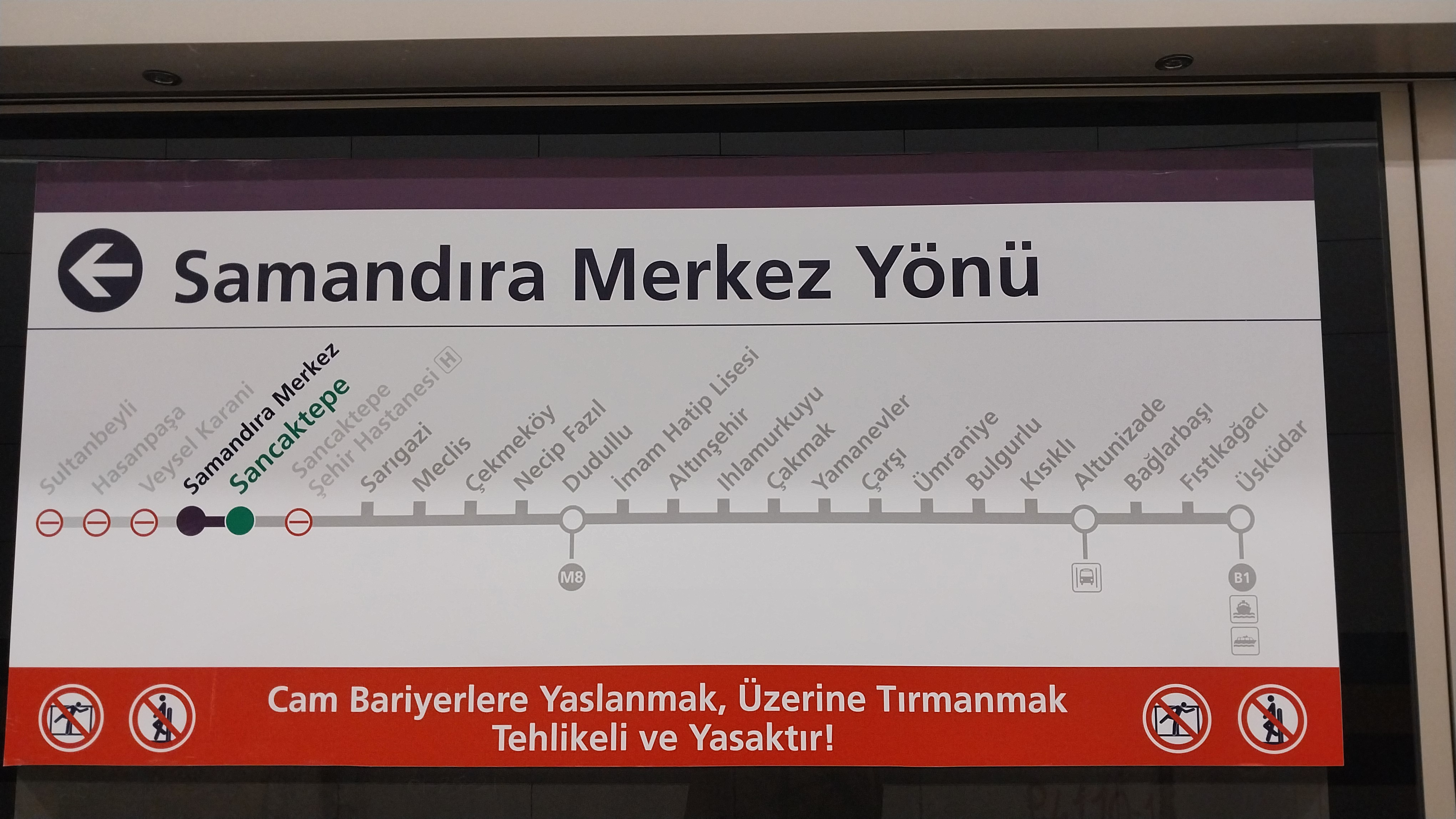
Line map

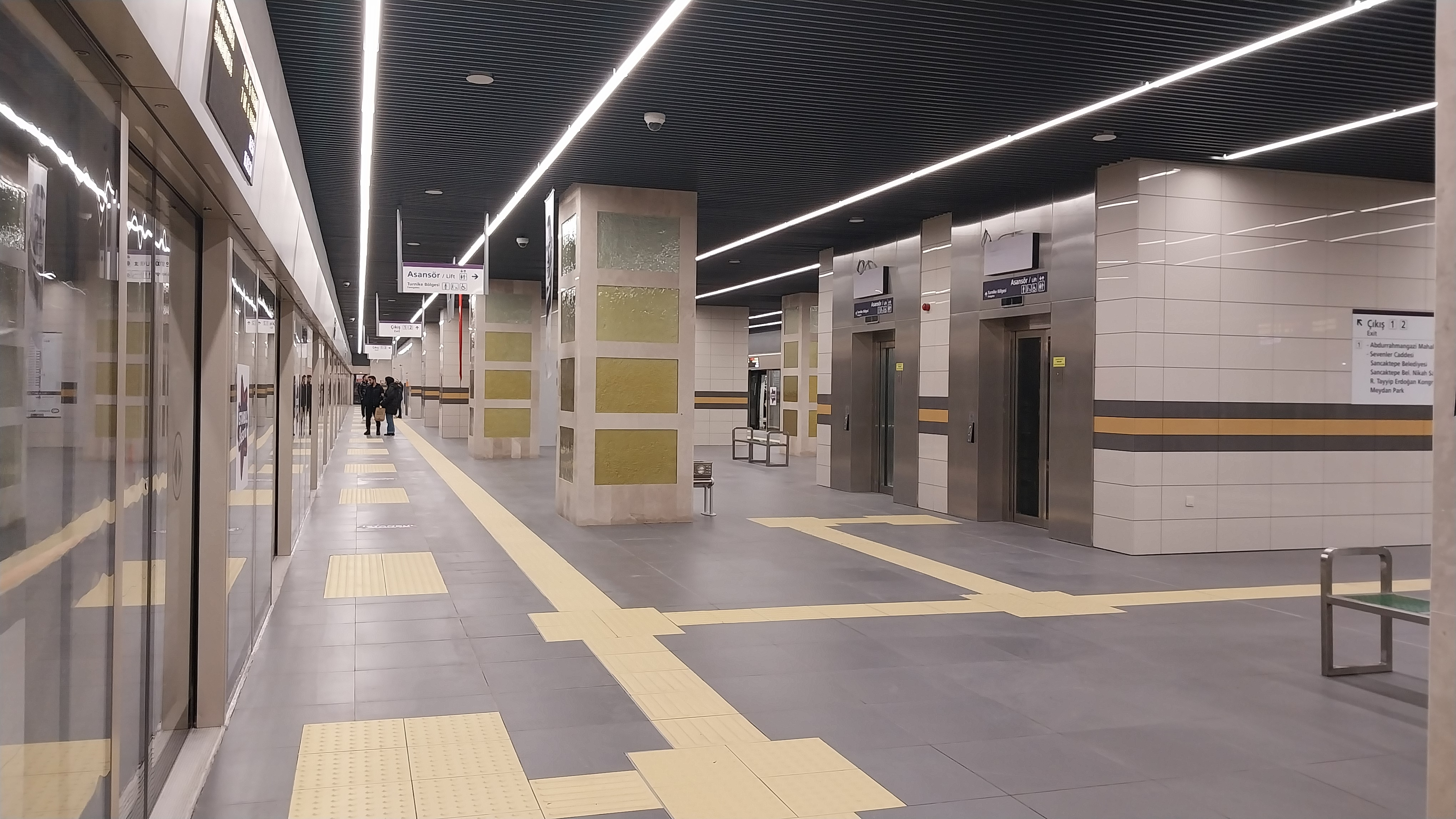
Platform span

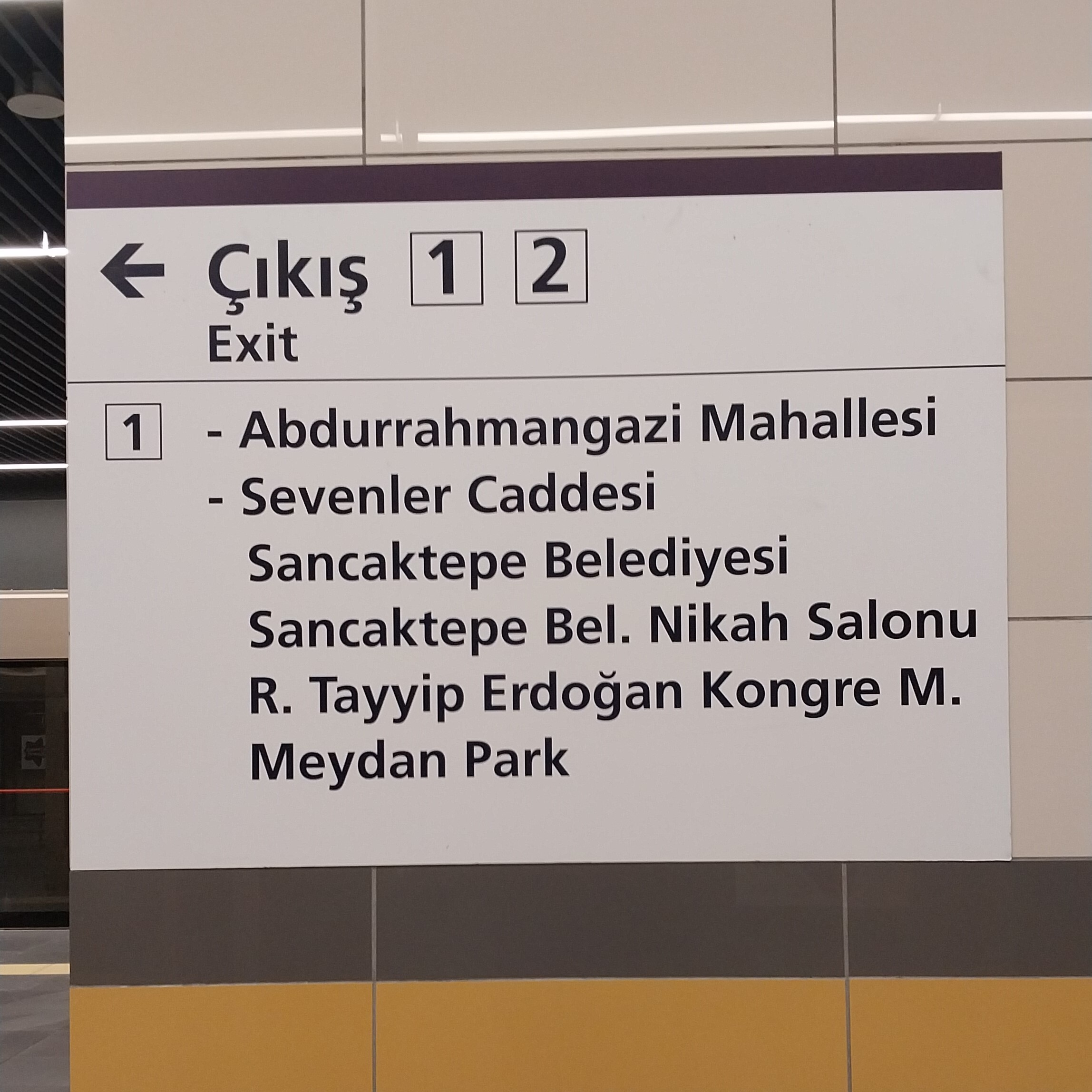
Exit sign

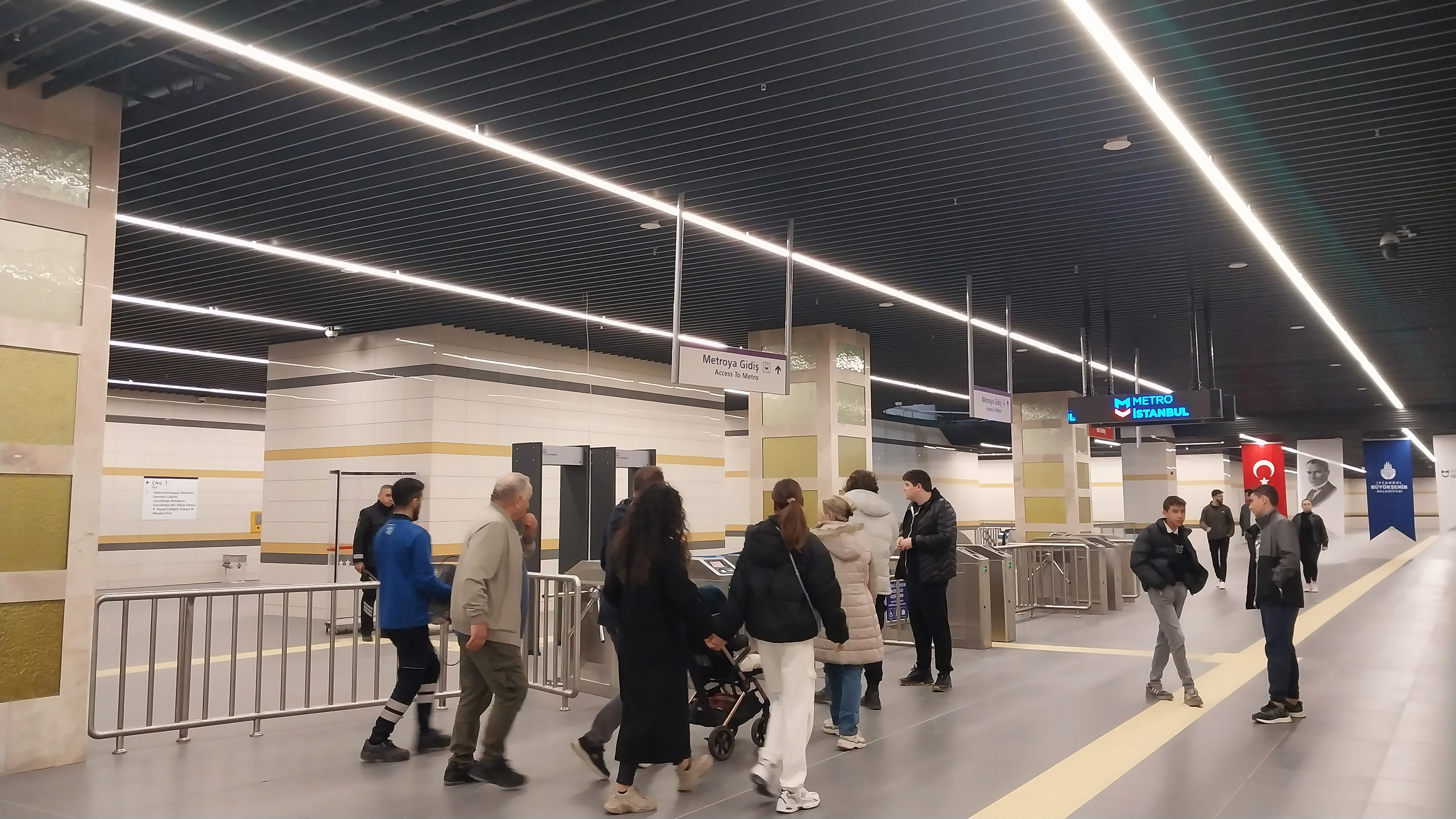
Ticket hall

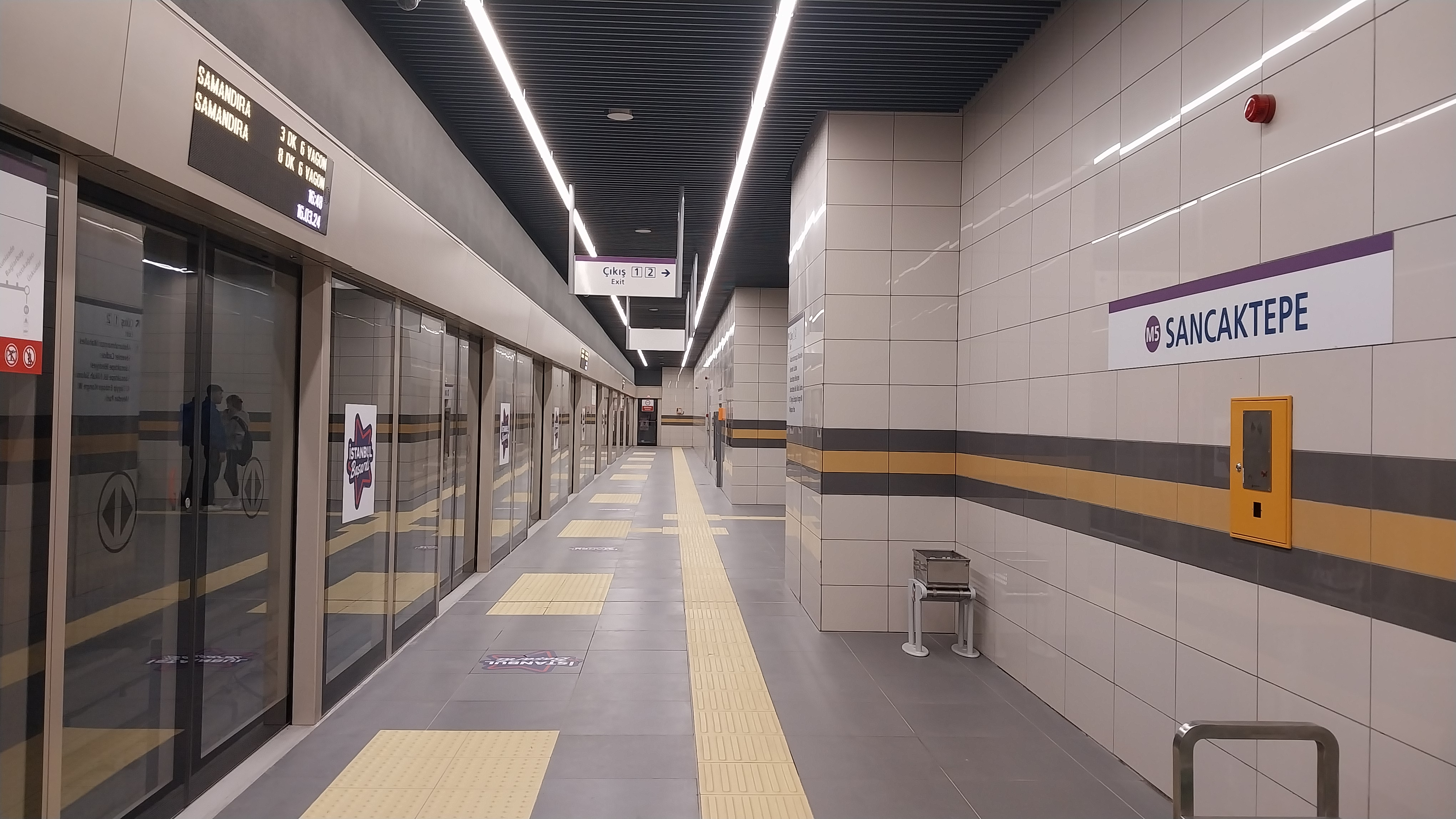
Platform
