= Bathonea =

Archaeological town site in Turkey

Coordinates: 41.0335°N 28.7339°E

Bathonea (Ancient Greek: Βαθονεία) is the probable name of a local community division known as a hekatostys (ἑκατοστύς, meaning "Hundred") of Byzantion or Rhegion that has generated considerable archaeological interest after being erroneously promoted as a "lost" city. It is located on the European shore of the sea of Marmara, 20 km west from Istanbul, Turkey, in Avcılar, Istanbul.

== Excavations ==
Among the claims are that it was at some point home to some of the Varangian Guards, elite Norsemen guards & settlers in Constantinople. The ruins found at the site, which have always remained visible, were studied extensively in 1930, specially during the Republican era by the Swiss archeologist Ernest Mamboury, who firstly thought and identified the settlement as the town of Rhegion based on some ancient sources.

In 2009, a new identification was proposed, as the Hellenistic-Roman city of Bathonea, which was taken as fact, generating considerable academic and public interest. At present, excavations are conducted under the direction of Dr. Şengül Aydıngün, an associate Professor of the Kocaeli University, and it continues to be promoted as a "lost" city despite the presence of only scant archaeological remains and no such city ever being referenced by any known contemporary sources from the Classical or Byzantine periods.

== Name ==
Because archeologists are at a site unknown by any historical sources, they are hesitant to draw conclusions. The name "Bathonea" is indeed a placeholder, taken from two inspirations. Pliny the Elder's Natural History names a river feeding the lake as the "Bathynias." Also, a monk named Theopanes' work refers to the local region as "Bathyasos." These are both likely variants of the name of the hekatostys.

== See also ==
- Archaeological sites at Lake Küçükçekmece

== Sources ==
- Mamboury, Ernest (1953). The Tourists' Istanbul. Istanbul: Çituri Biraderler Basımevi.
