= Lake Küçükçekmece =

- Küçükçekmece Gölü
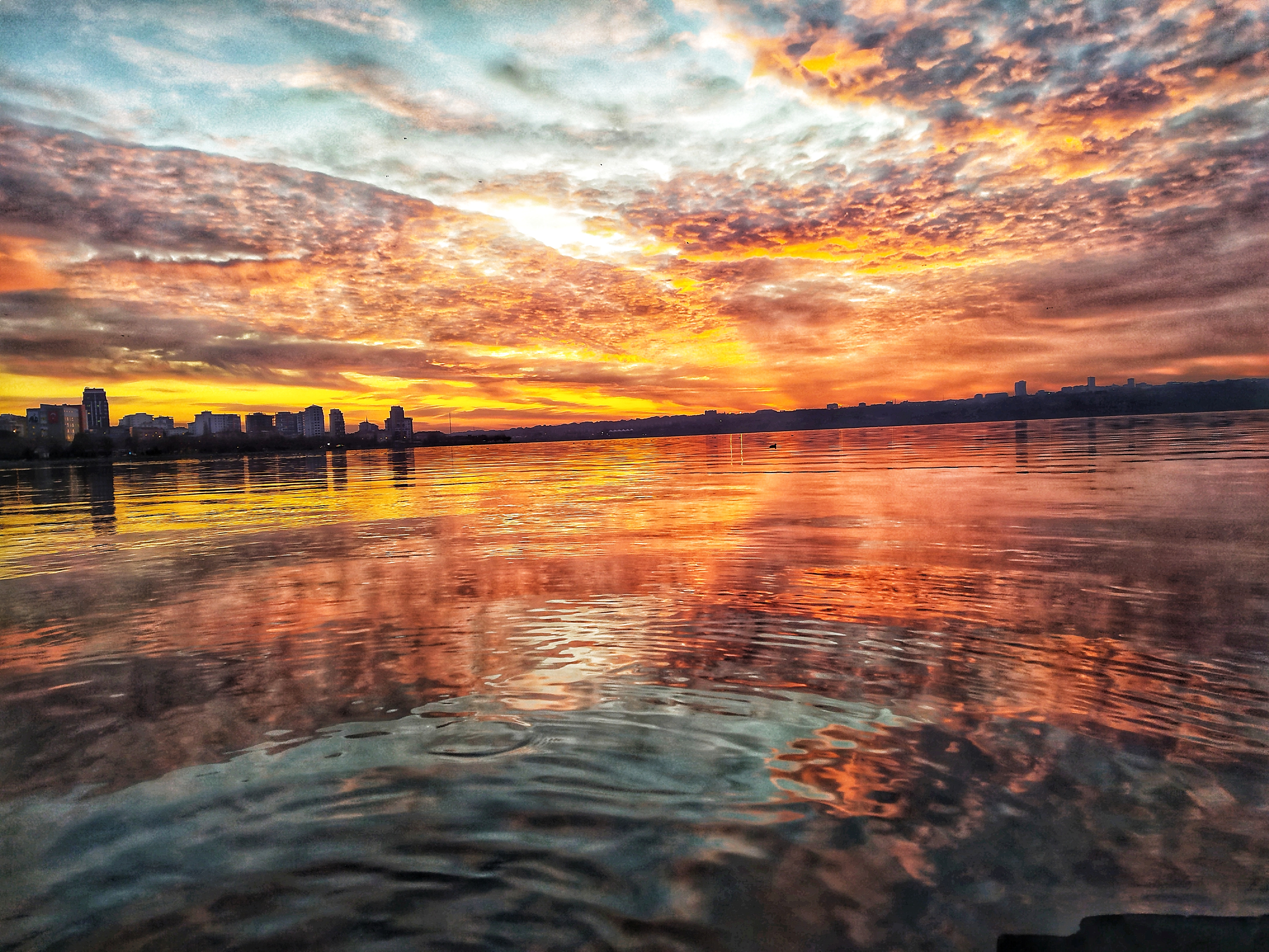
- Lake Küçükçekmece

- Location within Istanbul
- Location: Küçükçekmece, Istanbul Province
- Coordinates: 41°00′23″N 28°44′42″E
- Type: Lagoon
- Primary inflows: Nakkaş, Sazlıdere and Eşkinoz
- Primary outflows: Marmara
- Catchment area: 622 km^{2} (240 sq mi)
- Basin countries: Turkey
- Max. length: 10 km (6.2 mi)
- Max. width: 6 km (3.7 mi)
- Surface area: 16 km^{2} (6.2 sq mi)
- Max. depth: 22 m (72 ft)
- Surface elevation: 0 m (0 ft)
- Islands: No
- Settlements: Küçükçekmece, Avcılar, Esenyurt

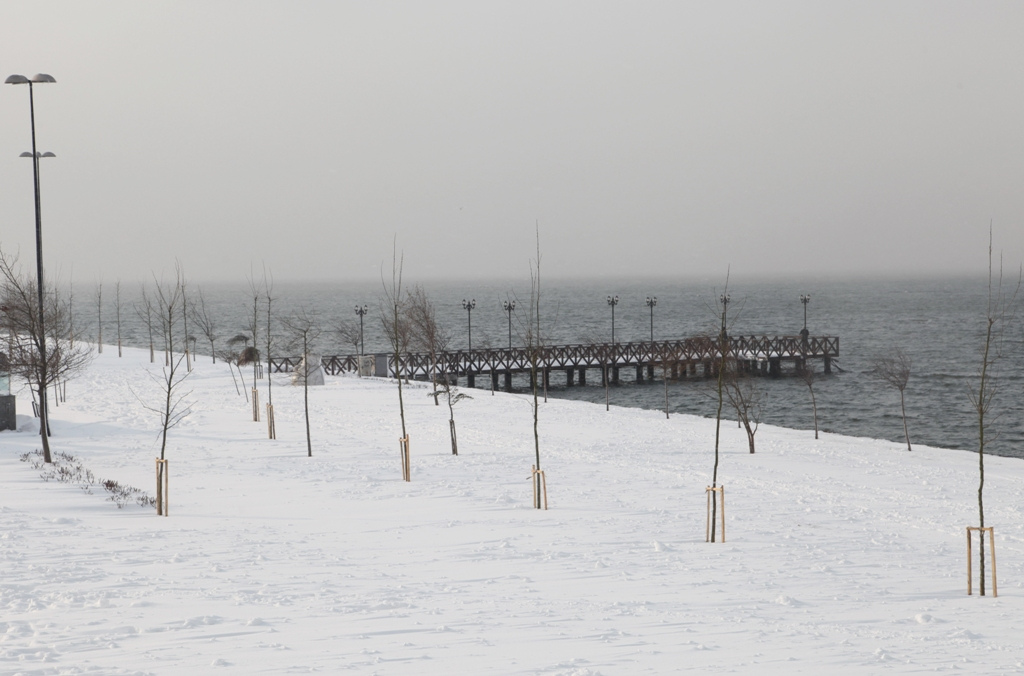
A view of the lake in winter.

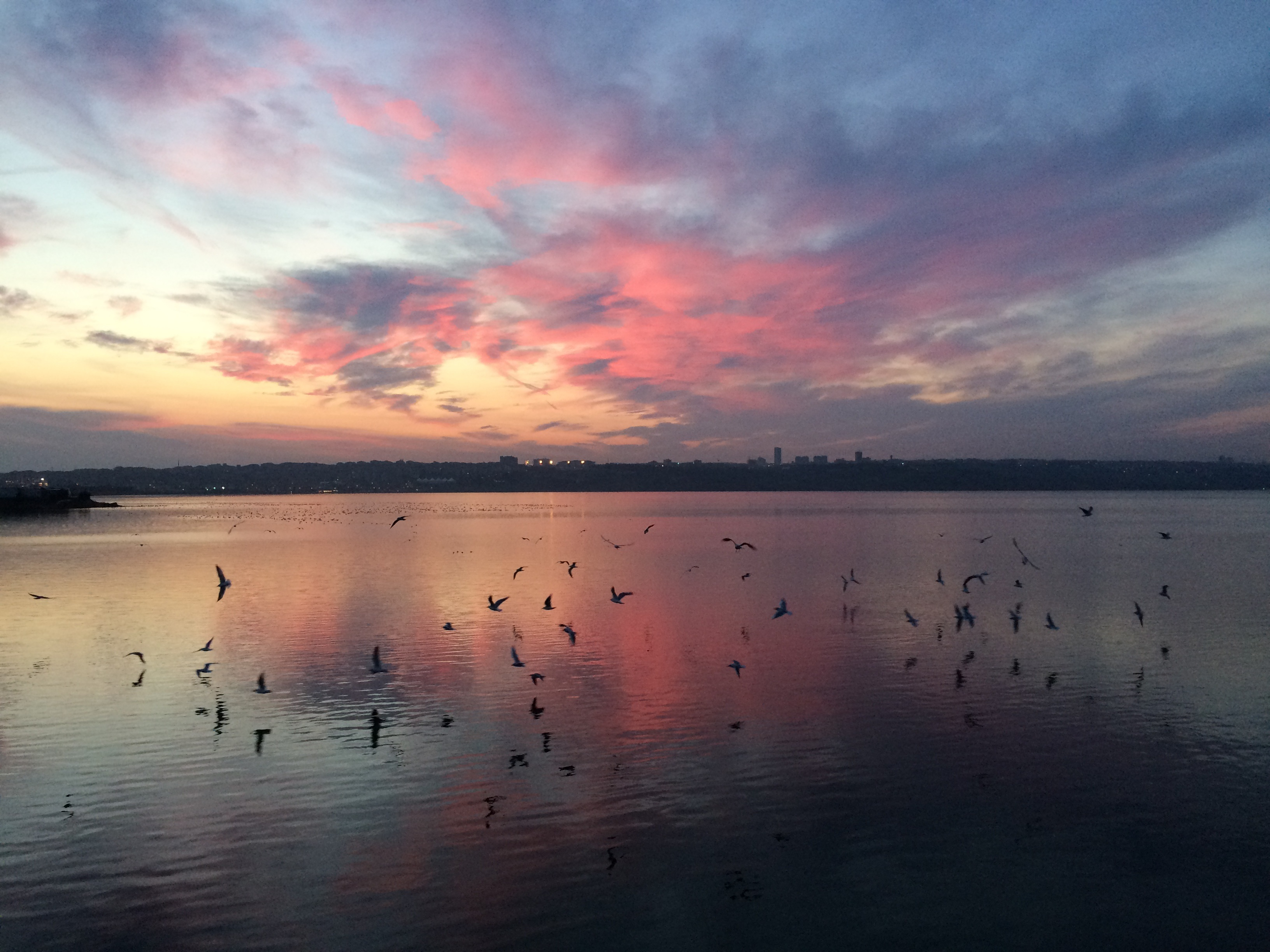

Lake Küçükçekmece (Turkish: Küçükçekmece Gölü) is a lagoon located between the Küçükçekmece, Esenyurt and Avcılar districts of the European portion of Istanbul Province, northwestern Turkey. The lake is neighbored in the south by state road D.100 and in the north by the O-3 motorway (European route E80).

The proposed controversial Istanbul Canal is intended to pass through the lake, though the so-called construction of the canal has been in-halt ever since its construction started by ceremony back in 2021.

== Location and characteristics ==
Situated 15 km (9.3 mi) west of Istanbul's city center, the lake was formed in shallow water when a sandbank caused its separation from the Sea of Marmara. A narrow channel in the east interrupts this sandbank, and serves as an outlet emptying excessive water in the lake into the Sea of Marmara. However, in situations where the sea is rough or the lake's water level gets too low due to drought, sea water may penetrate into the lake, causing the lake water to become brackish. The lake is fed from the north by the Nakkaş, Sazlıdere and Eşkinoz streams. The lake has a length of 10 km (6.2 mi) north-south by a maximum width of 6 km (3.7 mi). The lake's surface area is 16 km^{2} (6.2 sq mi), and its maximum depth is 20 m (66 ft).

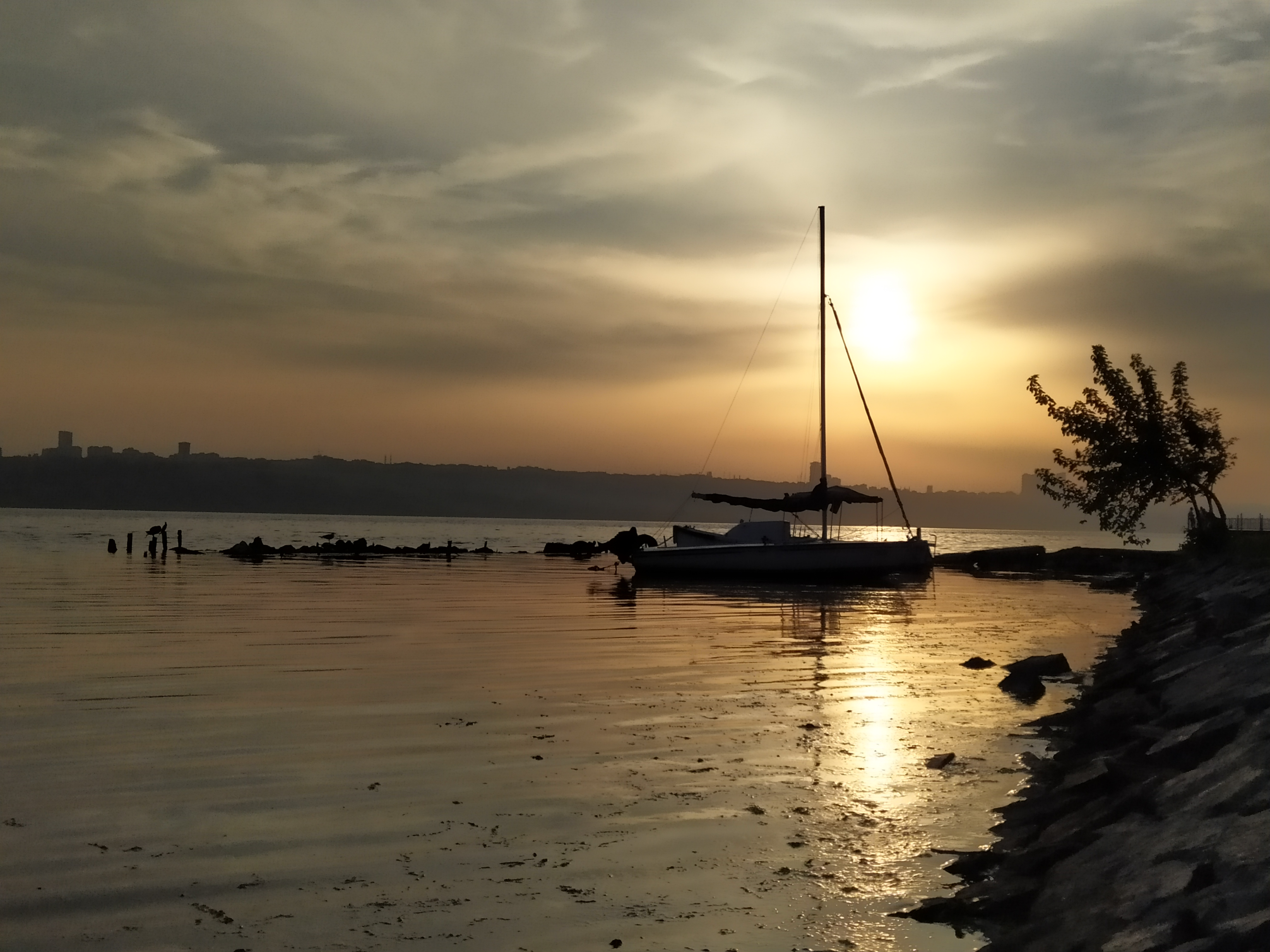

The lake is significantly polluted due to rapid urbanization, migration and industrialization activities over the last decade in the area around it. Its water is currently not compliant with safe drinking water standards.

Fauna observed in the lake basin consist of pygmy cormorant (Microcarbo pygmeus), great cormorant (Phalacrocorax carbo), and A4iii group waterbirds.

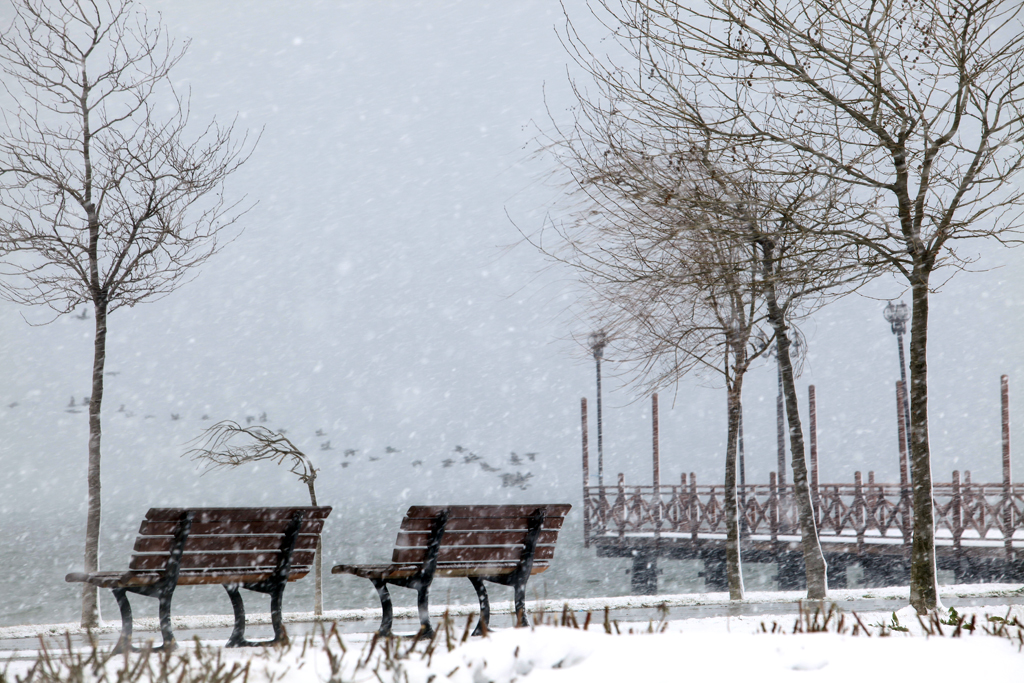
One of the lake shore-parks in winter.

== Archaeological sites ==
Within the lake basin, the ancient settlement of Bathonea was unearthed, which is estimated to be approximately 1,600 years old. Such archaeological finds extracted from and around the lake shed light on Istanbul's historical chronology.

The finds include stone tools indicating early agricultural activities, potsherds dating back to the Neolithic and Iron Age periods (8,000 – 1,000 BC), amphora fragments from the Hellenistic period (fourth century BC), remains of walls along the lake shore, column capitals, and works from the Roman period. 440 small terracotta bottles 10–20 mm (0.39–0.79 in) in size containing tar-like fossilized material also were discovered. Vessel anchors were found in the lake and along the lake shore. In 2011, a 14 m (46 ft)-wide and 7 m (23 ft)-deep cistern was uncovered that might span 120 m (390 ft). It was built with bricks bearing signs of the Emperor Constantine and a notable cleric of the time. In 2012, two underground water tunnels were discovered and subsequently, were surveyed by speleologists. They were built partly during the Roman Period and Late Roman period. Although one water tunnel is connected to the cistern, the other leads to a fountain still in use today. There are access shafts at certain points within the water tunnel. Structures in the ancient settlement, such as a lighthouse, port, and pier point toward the past existence of a port city.

From observations of aerial views, evidence of previous roads arranged in a grid plan was detected. According to the results of excavations and examinations carried out between 2007 and 2009, Bathonea was destroyed by a large-scale earthquake, after which it was abandoned.

An anthropological forensic study of a human skull extracted from one of the 70 historic graves in Bathonea, revealed that thousands of years ago, an attempt at brain surgery was made there.

== Sports ==
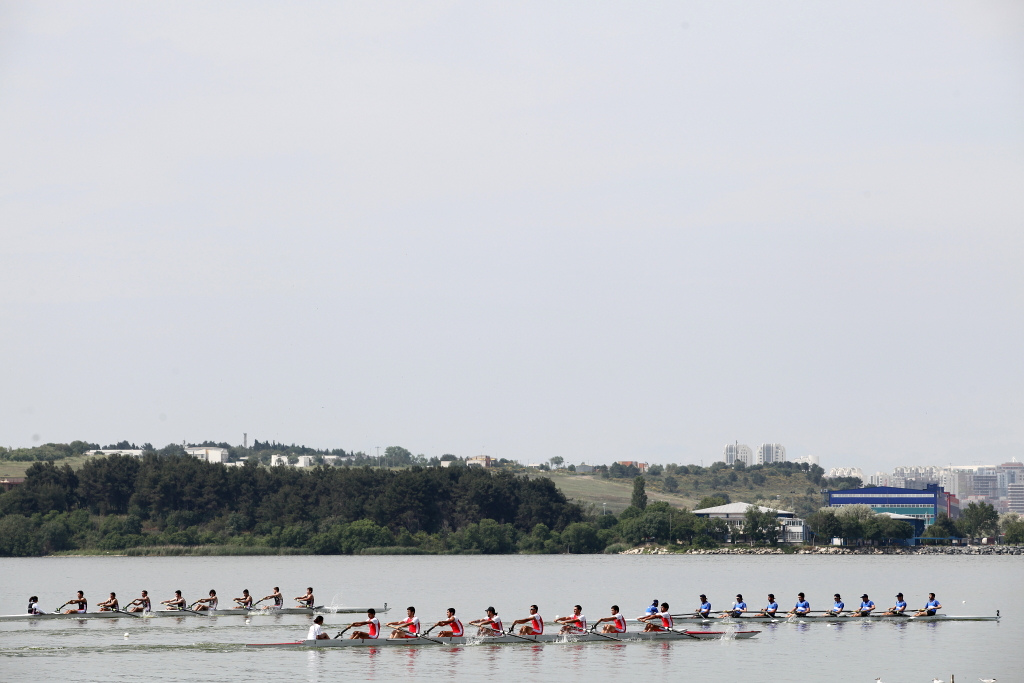
The Uniçek Water Sports festival

Since 2012, the municipality of Küçükçekmece holds "Uniçek", an annual water sports festival for university students. Some of the events featured in the 2015 festival were rowing, modern dragon boat racing and stillwater canoe sprint, in which around 800 sportspeople from 18 different universities, 7 canoe clubs and 40 corporations competed. In addition, shows of wakeboarding, waterskiing, jet-skiing and paramotoring were held as well.

Since 1999, Galatasaray's rowing division is based in Kanarya neighborhood at Lake Küçükçekmece with its 120 racing boats.

== See also ==
- Küçükçekmece
- Lake Büyükçekmece
