= Kayabaşı, Başakşehir =

Kayabaşı Ayayorgi
- Neighbourhood
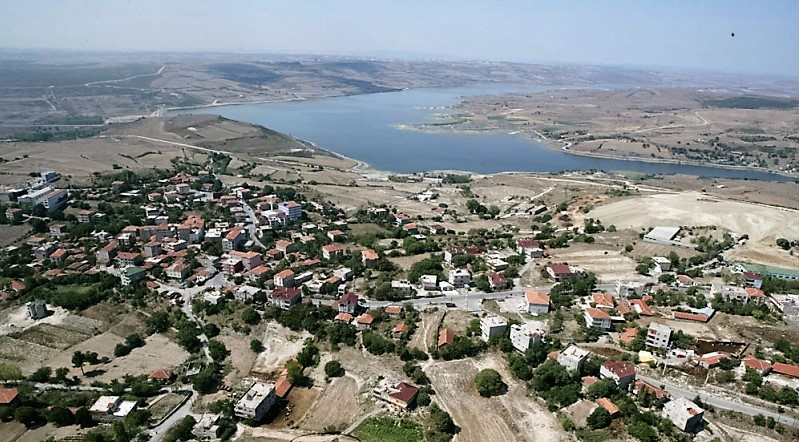

- Location within Turkey Location within Istanbul
- Coordinates: 41°06′40″N 28°44′30″E
- Country: Turkey
- Province: Istanbul
- District: Başakşehir

Government
  - Muhtar: Doğan Azat
- Elevation: 120 m (390 ft)
- Population (2022): 111,395
- Time zone: UTC+3 (TRT)
- Postal code: 34494
- Area code: 0212
- Website: www.kayabasimahallesi.com

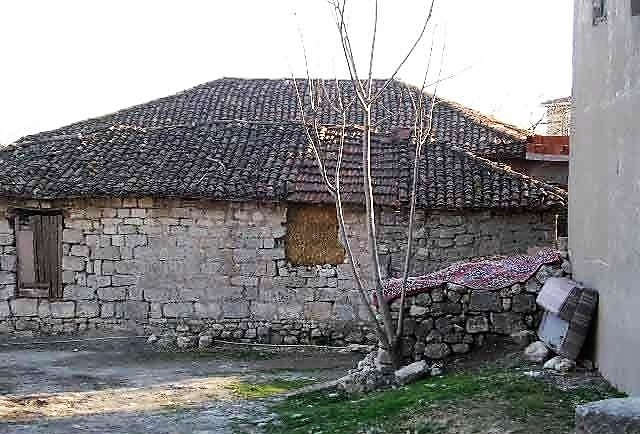
Ashlar building from Orthodox inhabitants in Kayabaşı

Kayabaşı is a neighbourhood in the municipality and district of Başakşehir, Istanbul Province, Turkey. Its population is 111,395 (2022). It was formerly known as Ayayorgi (from Greek: Άγιος Γεώργιος, "St. George") and Azatlı until the Greco-Turkish population exchange of 1923.

Kayabaşı was a district of Bakırköy until 1987 then it was a quarter of Küçükçekmece where was a part of the Çatalca kaza until 1908. By the last change of administrative division of İstanbul in 2009 it is a quarter of Başakşehir.

== Geography ==
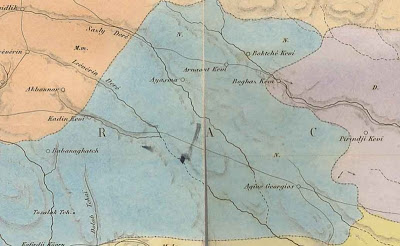
Map of the region Arnavutköy in 1850

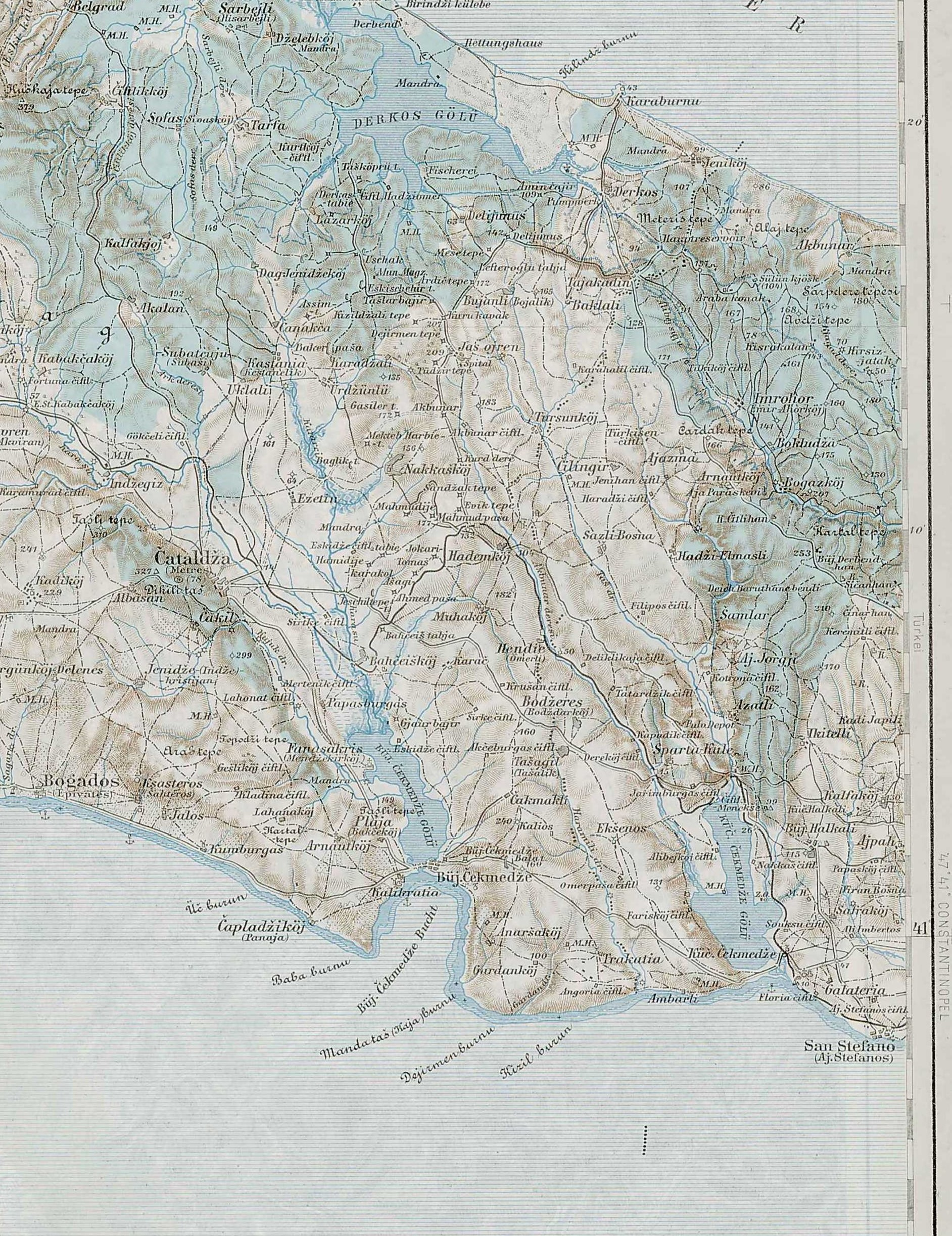
Settlements with old names in 1900

Kayabaşı is located about 4 km to north of Lake Küçükçekmece over Yarımburgaz Cave, about 1 km to west of Sazlıdere Dam and 5 km to south of Arnavutköy (Greek: Αρναούτκιοϊ) over Şamlar village. There is a new settlement, namely Kayaşehir which started to established in 2010 in the region.

== Etymology ==
"Kaya" means rocky in Turkish. It has taken Kaya-başı name in Turkish due to the rocky terrain.

== Population ==
It has about 450 households of mübadil (i.e. people exchanged during the Greco-Turkish population exchange) the in old village centre. It has taken over migration all over Turkey because of the established industrial site in the district. According to the administrative addition with new city of Kayaşehir it had a population of 60.191 in 2015 census.

== History ==
=== History of region ===
==== Yarımburgaz Cave ====
Yarımburgaz Cave has a historical importance for İstanbul. The cave is an important fossil site which has been researched by archeologists, paleontologists, geoarchaeologists and biospeleologists. In the Byzantine era, a cave-church was carved into the walls of the upper cave, and a monastery was built outside the cave mouth. Some artifacts found in Yarımburgaz Cave are exhibited in the Istanbul Archaeology Museums.

==== Azatlı Baruthanesi ====
The tr:Azatlı Baruthanesi (Azatlı Gunpowder Mill) was built in 1795 to serve the purpose of producing gunpowder for the Ottoman Army. Due to necessity of water for producing gunpowder Şamlar Bendi was built in Mahmut II's reign in 1826–1828. It was operated by Dadian family who was an Ottoman Armenian. Privileges were granted by Sultan to Armenian workforce in the region to produce gunpowder. On account of that privilege the region was known as Azatlı. The Baruthane was destroyed during the Russo-Turkish War (1877–78) by Russian Army and closed.

==== Şamlar village ====
The oldest building in the village is a mosque dated 1839 and school is dated 1903. A part of village territory was confiscated during the construction of Sazlıdere Dam.

==== Resneli Farm ====
After the Second Constitutional Era of the Ottoman Empire a farm was established in place of Azatlık; the farm was known as Resneli Farm referring to Resneli Niyazi Bey, a military officer from Resen (then a part of Ottoman Empire), who was a hero of Young Turk Revolution in 1908. Aftermath Ottoman Armanians send away from Azatlı.

=== Population Exchange ===
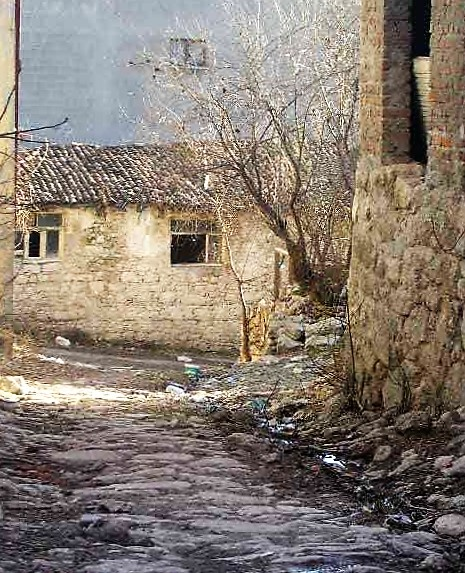
Another ashlar house and pathway from Orthodox inhabitants in Kayabaşı

Because of Treaty of Lausanne village was included the Greco-Turkish population exchange of 1923. Muslim inhabitants left from Kovitsa in Drama by train from Drama train station. Muslim inhabitants firstly settled in Yeşilköy in Istanbul but it is not suitable for animal husbandry especially goat raising. Then they settled in Kayabaşı and Mahmutşevketpaşa in Istanbul, and also others Halitpaşa in Manisa, Kadıköy in Keşan, Yağcılar in Akhisar and some villages of Orhangazi, and İznik in Bursa, hence Orthodox Christian inhabitants in Kayabaşı most of them went to Kayalar(Greek: Πτολεμαΐδα, Ptolemaïda) in Greece from Turkey.

Orthodox inhabitants of Kayabaşı marked living by vineyard and farming in particular. Kayabaşı remains water wells and tile drain ruins and part of wall ruins of church from Orthodox inhabitants. There are remained houses which was built by Orthodox inhibitans and there are still some old houses which was built by first Muslim inhabitants.

There were two church in Kayabaşı during the population exchange. Current mosque was built from a different palace of church with demolished church materials in 1950s. There was a school which was built in 1930s rebuilt with current school building in 2000s.

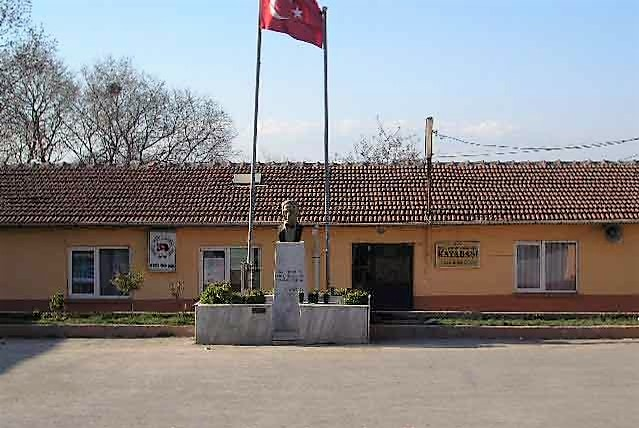
Demolished old school in Kayabaşı

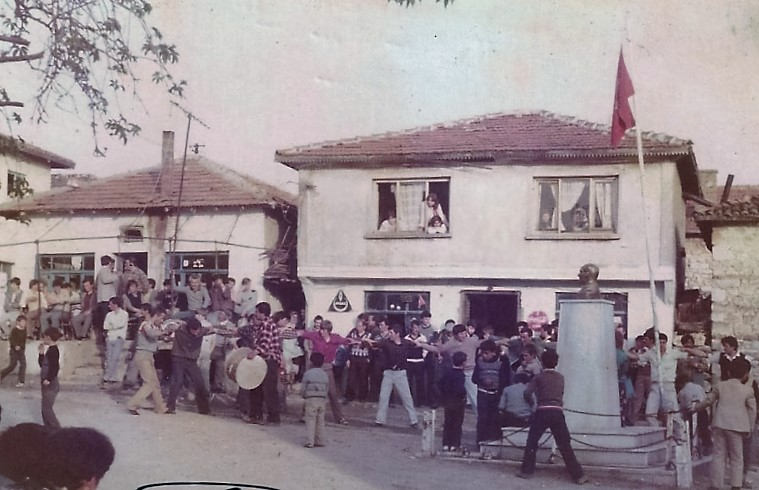
A wedding in public square of Kayabaşı

Nowadays, livestock and farming is gradually decreasing because of expropriation to establish new city cite. Some of the villagers migrated abroad because of changing business facilities.

== Gallery ==
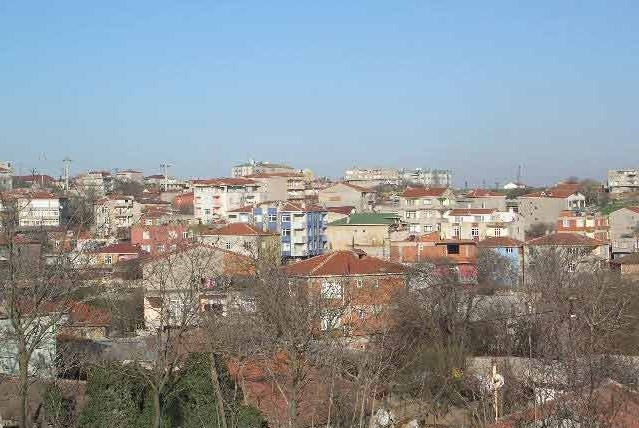
East side of Kayabaşı

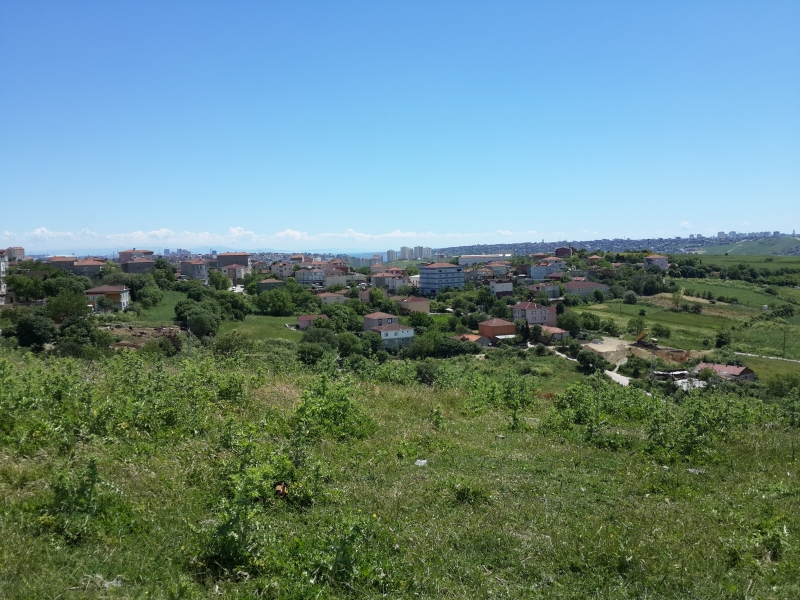
Kayabaşı in summer

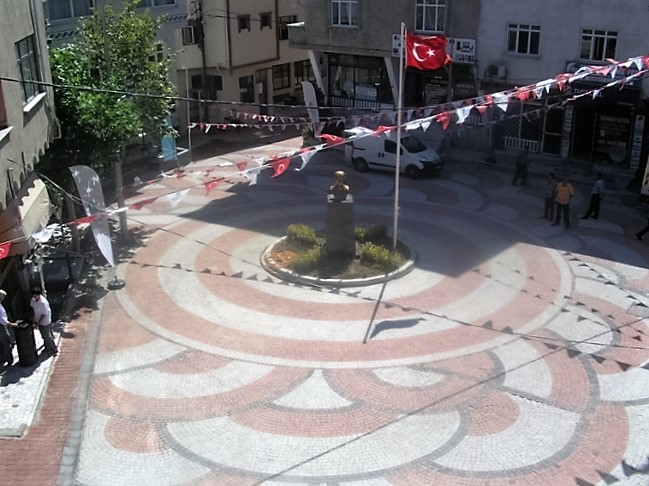
Public square of Kayabaşı

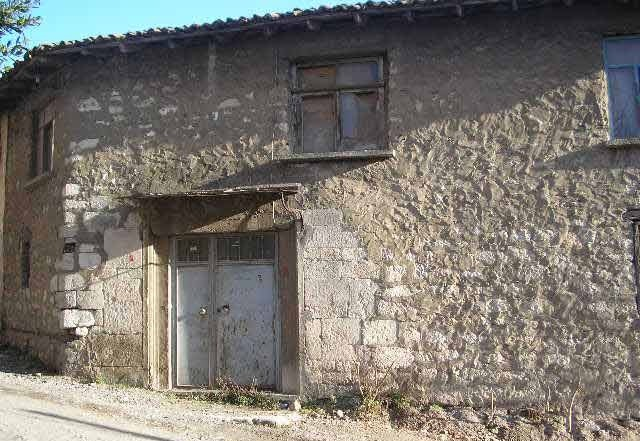
A ashlar house in kayabaşı

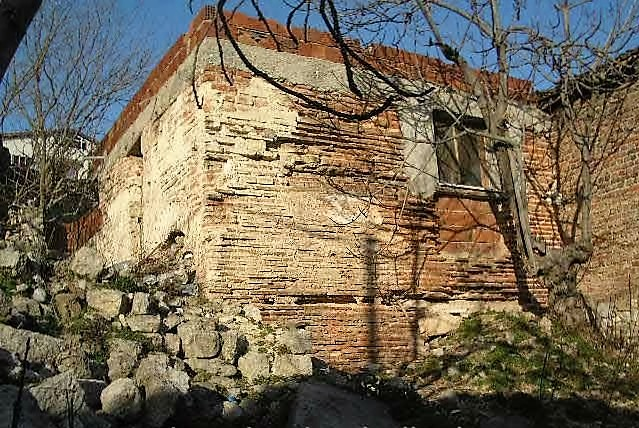
Old house in Kayabaşı
