= Başakşehir =

- District and municipality
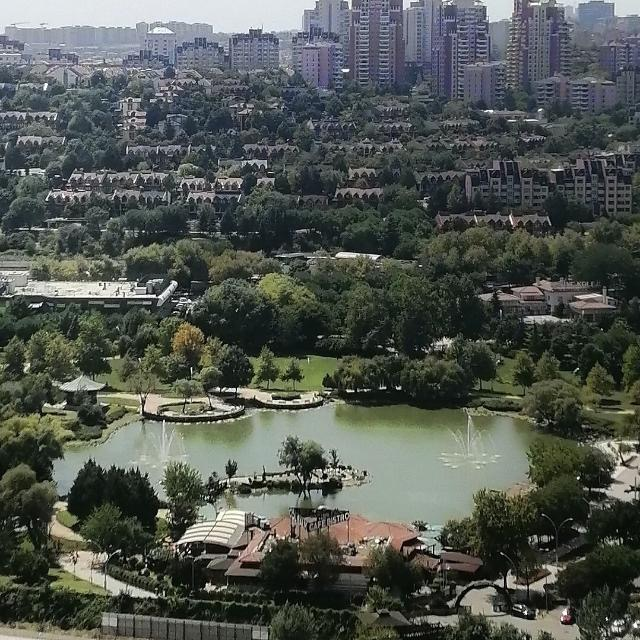
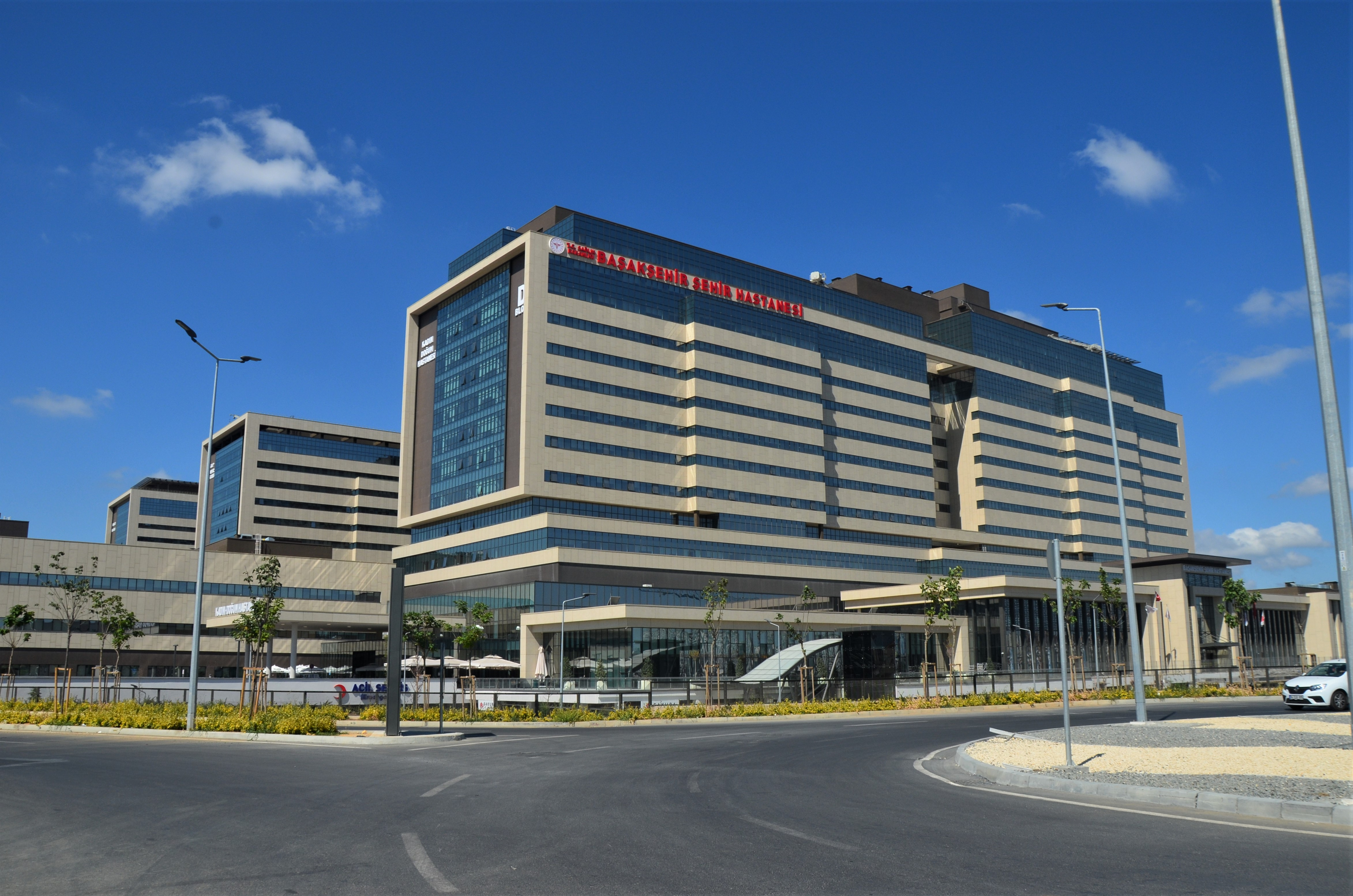
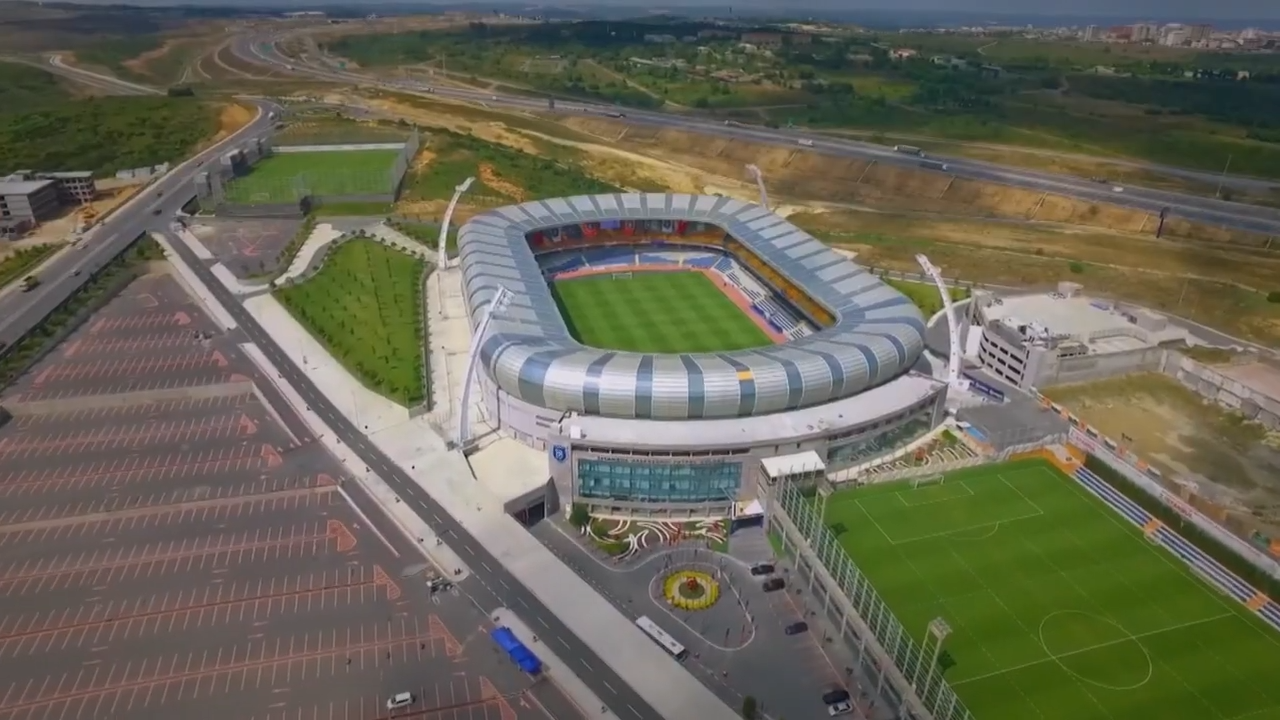
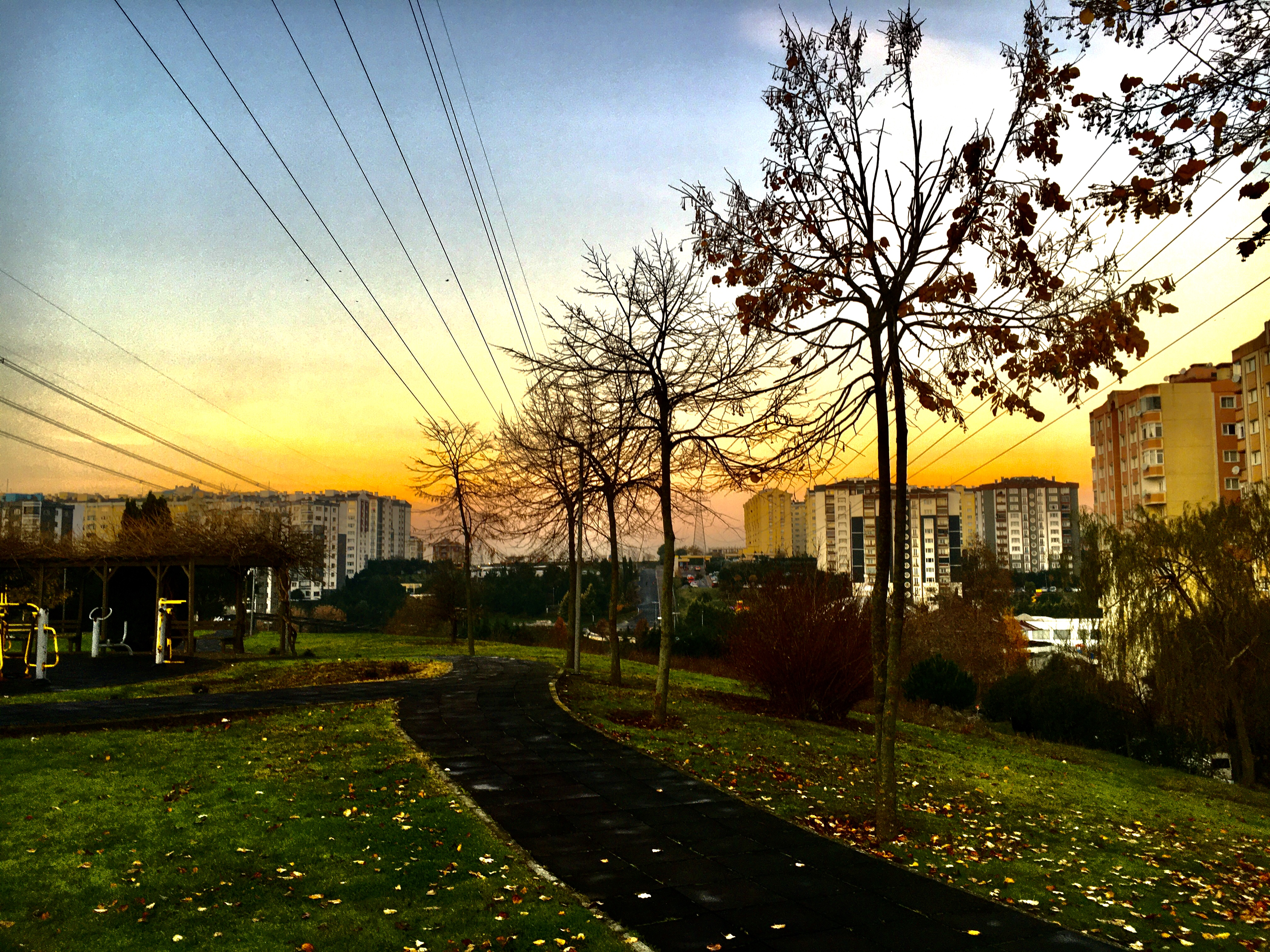
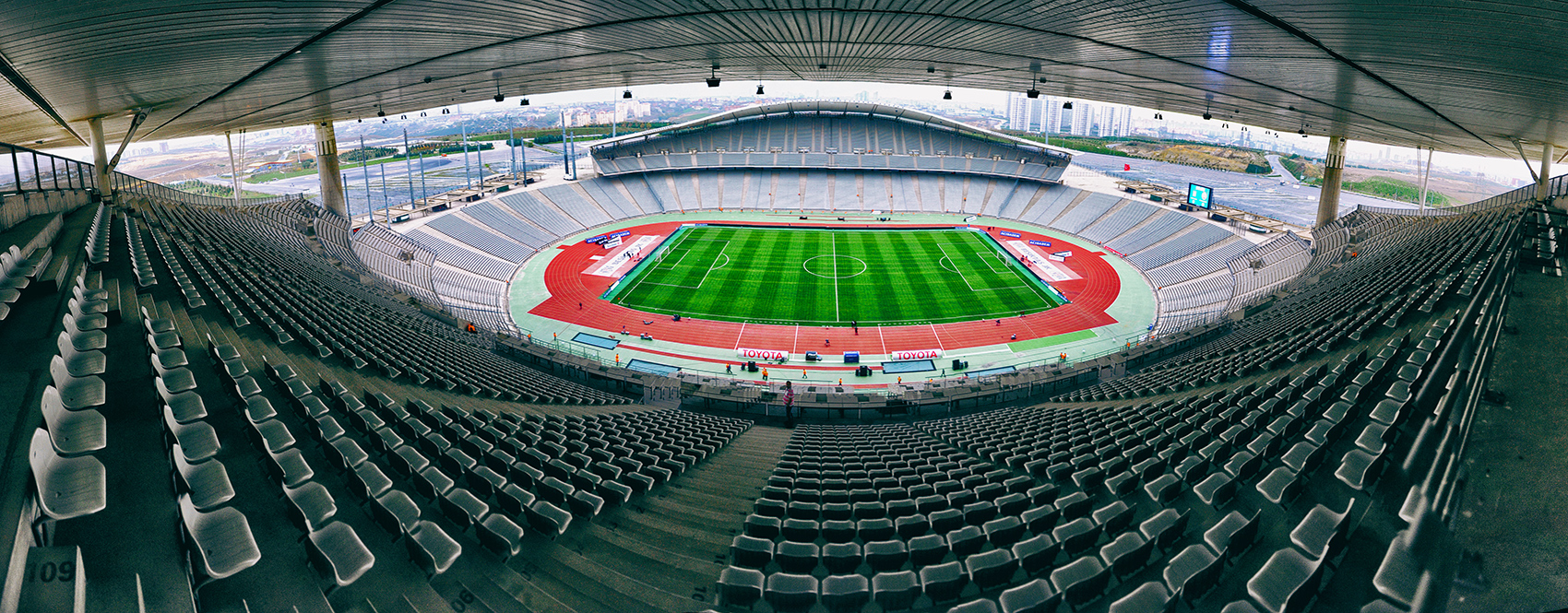
- Clockwise from top: Bahçeşehir Pound in Başakşehir, Başakşehir Çam and Sakura City Hospital, Başakşehir Fatih Terim Stadium, Yunus Emre Avenue in Başakşehir and Atatürk Olympic Stadium

- Logo

- Map showing Başakşehir District in Istanbul Province

- Location within Turkey Location within Istanbul
- Coordinates: 41°05′N 28°49′E
- Country: Turkey
- Province: Istanbul

Government
  - Mayor: Yasin Kartoğlu (AKP)
- Area: 107 km^{2} (41 sq mi)
- Elevation: 70 m (230 ft)
- Population (2022): 514,900
  - Density: 4,810/km^{2} (12,500/sq mi)
- Time zone: UTC+3 (TRT)
- Postal code: 34488-34494
- Area code: 0212
- Website: basaksehir.bel.tr

Başakşehir is a municipality and district of Istanbul Province, Turkey. Its area is 107 km^{2}, and its population is 514,900 (2022). It is in the European part of Istanbul. The district is home to İstanbul Başakşehir F.K., a football team competing in the Süper Lig. It also includes Ibn Haldun University and Başakşehir Çam and Sakura City Hospital. Additionally, the district features Bahçeşehir, one of Turkey's early suburban residential development projects. Notable sports venues in the district include Atatürk Olympic Stadium and Başakşehir Fatih Terim Stadium. BBC News has referred to Başakşehir as a primary hub for the middle and upper-class conservative demographic in Turkey. This description is based on the concept of the WASP model, emphasizing the district's representation of a particular sociocultural identity and lifestyle associated with conservative values in urban spaces.

== History ==
Archaeological evidence suggests that the earliest traces of human activity in Istanbul can be found in the Yarımburgaz Cave, located in Başakşehir. Excavations in the area have revealed that the region has a deep historical significance, dating back to prehistoric times. Artifacts discovered within the cave and its surroundings have been identified as belonging to the Paleolithic period, highlighting Başakşehir's role as one of the earliest known human settlements in the area. Başakşehir, located around the historical Via Egnatia that connected the Byzantine Empire’s western territories to Europe, has historically been of strategic importance. Its southern region, in particular, was a key passageway during incursions into Istanbul, making it a transit point for various invasions.

On March 23, 1453, Sultan Mehmed II departed Edirne with a grand army, beginning the campaign that culminated in the conquest of Constantinople. The route of this army passed through the borders of Küçükçekmece and Başakşehir. During the Ottoman period, the village of Kayabaşı, then known as Aya Yorgi, was a Greek settlement. Alongside the Greek population, Armenians employed at the Baruthane, a gunpowder mill also resided there.

Significant developments in the area occurred with the construction of the Chemins de fer Orientaux. On October 7, 1869, German financier Maurice de Hirsch received a concession for the railways, and the Yedikule–Küçükçekmece Line began construction on June 4, 1869. The line was inaugurated on January 4, 1871, with Sirkeci designated as its starting point. Increased activity around Ispartakule Railway Station during this period brought challenges, including the Balkan Wars. Troop movements and the care of refugees and soldiers took place along the railway, with temporary Red Crescent hospitals established in Ayastefanos, Hadımköy, and Ispartakule. The Russo-Turkish War of 1877–1878 saw Russian forces advance to Yeşilköy, devastating the regions they passed through. They established headquarters there, prompting the Ottoman government to seek an armistice. The Edirne Armistice was signed on January 31, 1878, ending the conflict. Before their retreat, the Russians destroyed much of the area, including the Azadlu Baruthanesi in Başakşehir, forcing residents to flee.

Following the Balkan Wars, Muslim refugees displaced by enemy invasions were resettled in Başakşehir by the Ottoman government. Earlier migrations, such as those after the Crimean War, had brought Crimean Tatars to the region. Many were settled in state-owned lands, including the Sazlıbosna area, as well as villages and farms in Başakşehir. The Crimean War refugees were granted land for their needs, though some struggled to pay the accumulating rents and requested debt forgiveness. During the British occupation of Istanbul following World War I, local villages such as Şamlar were subjected to military raids. British forces conducted searches and confiscated weapons, creating a climate of fear among the population. The area was previously known as Azatlık. The area specialized in providing gunpowder to the Ottoman army. Later a farm was established in place of Azatlık, the farm was known as Resneli Çiftliği referring to Resneli Niyazi, a military officer from Resen, North Macedonia, then a part of Ottoman Empire, who was a hero of Young Turk Revolution in 1908.

After the proclamation of the Republic of Turkey, Başakşehir was administered as part of Bakırköy district for many years. On March 6, 2008, the municipality of Başakşehir was officially established under Law No. 5747. At the 2013 Turkish local government reorganisation, the rural part of the district was integrated into the municipality, the villages becoming neighbourhoods.

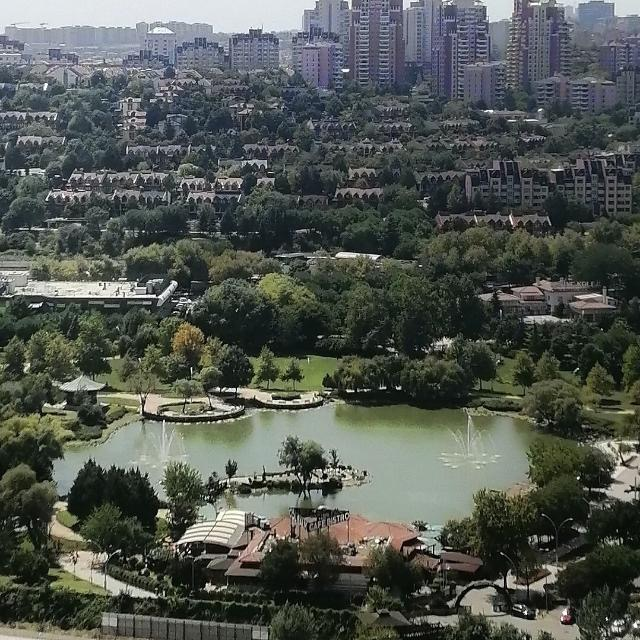
Bahçeşehir Göleti, the first and largest artificial pond in Istanbul, covering an area of 26,000 m².

Bahçeşehir, conceived as a gated community, was developed in 1987 by a consortium consisting of Süzer Group, Emlak Bankası, MESA-Nurol. The project was carried out under the patronage of Turgut Özal, the then Prime Minister of Turkey. The master plan for the area was prepared with consultancy from urban design firms based in the Netherlands and Denmark. Conceived as a suburban residential area, Bahçeşehir was designed with a focus on green spaces and consisted primarily of villas and apartment buildings. At the time of its development, the area featured facilities such as a country club, an equestrian club, and a nine-hole golf course, reflecting its status as a planned suburban community. These amenities contributed to its identity as one of Turkey's early examples of suburban living. In 1996, Bahçeşehir received recognition from the United Nations Habitat Programme with an award for "Sustainable Human Settlements." The district was also honored by the American Institute of Architects for its urban design. On March 6, 2008, with the enactment of Law No. 5747 on the "Establishment of Districts within the Boundaries of Metropolitan Municipalities and Amendments to Certain Laws," the legal entity of Bahçeşehir Municipality was dissolved, and the area was incorporated into Başakşehir.

== Geography ==
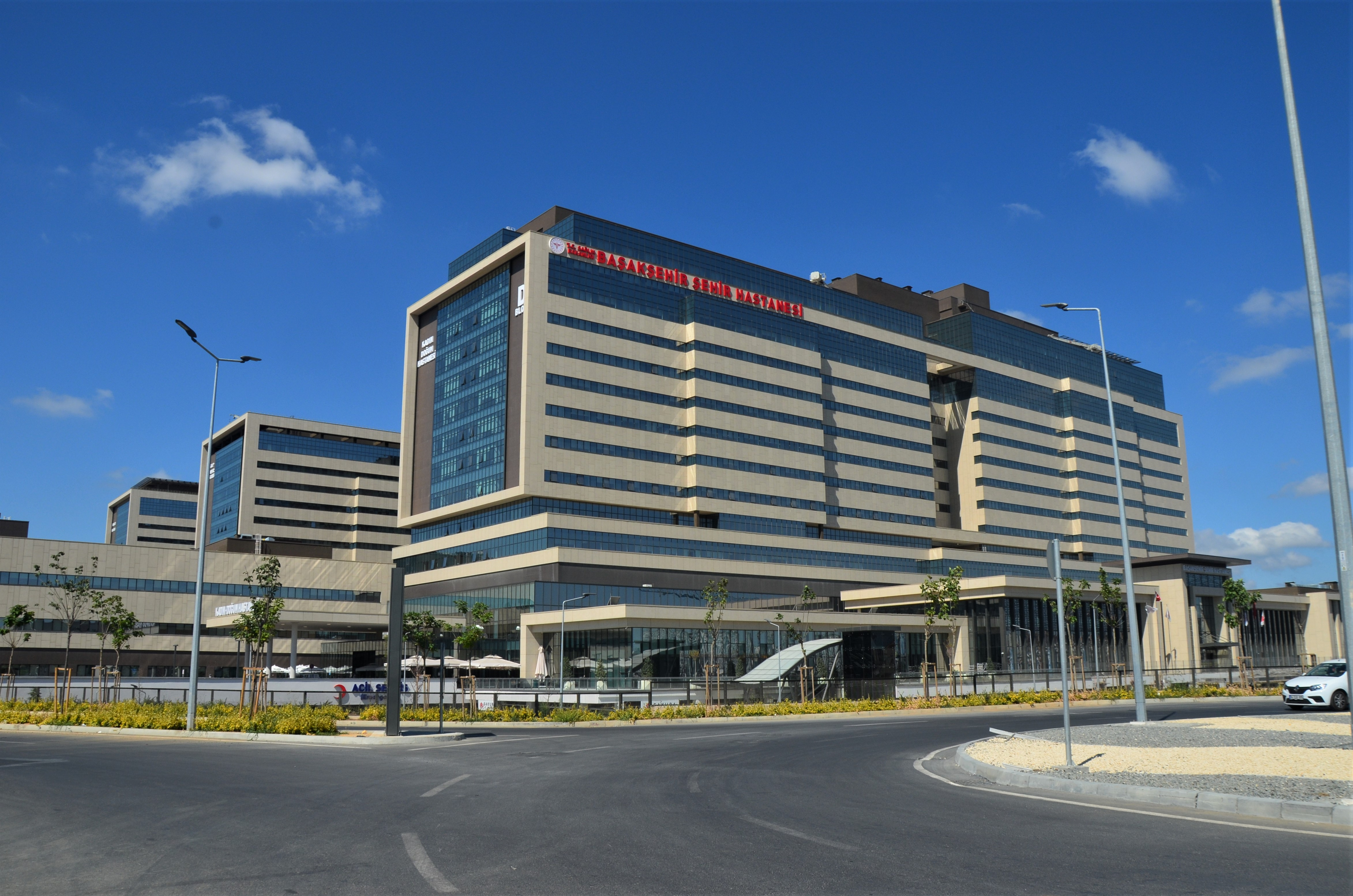
Başakşehir Çam and Sakura City Hospital, a large healthcare facility located in Başakşehir. It was developed by the Turkish Rönesans Healthcare and the Japanese Sojitz Corporation.

Başakşehir is located in the European part of Istanbul, also known as Rumeli. To the northwest lies the Sazlıdere Dam reservoir, while the Sea of Marmara is to the south. The O-3 European Motorway, also known as E80 European Route, begins in Mahmutbey within Başakşehir and runs westward towards Edirne. It is noted that the ground in Başakşehir is solid, which is considered advantageous in the event of a potential earthquake in Istanbul. Başakşehir Millet Bahçesi is a public green space in the district, covering an area of 280,000 m², offering a range of recreational opportunities. Bahçeşehir Göleti (English: Bahçeşehir Pound), the first and largest artificial pond in Istanbul, spans 26,000 m² and contributes to the district's natural environment. In addition to Başakşehir Çam and Sakura City Hospital, Başakşehir hosts several other healthcare facilities, including Başakşehir Public Hospital, Başakşehir Public Dental Hospital, Bahçeşehir Community Polyclinic, Acıbadem Bahçeşehir Clinic, Başakşehir Medical Center, and ISU Liv Hospital Bahçeşehir.

== Community ==
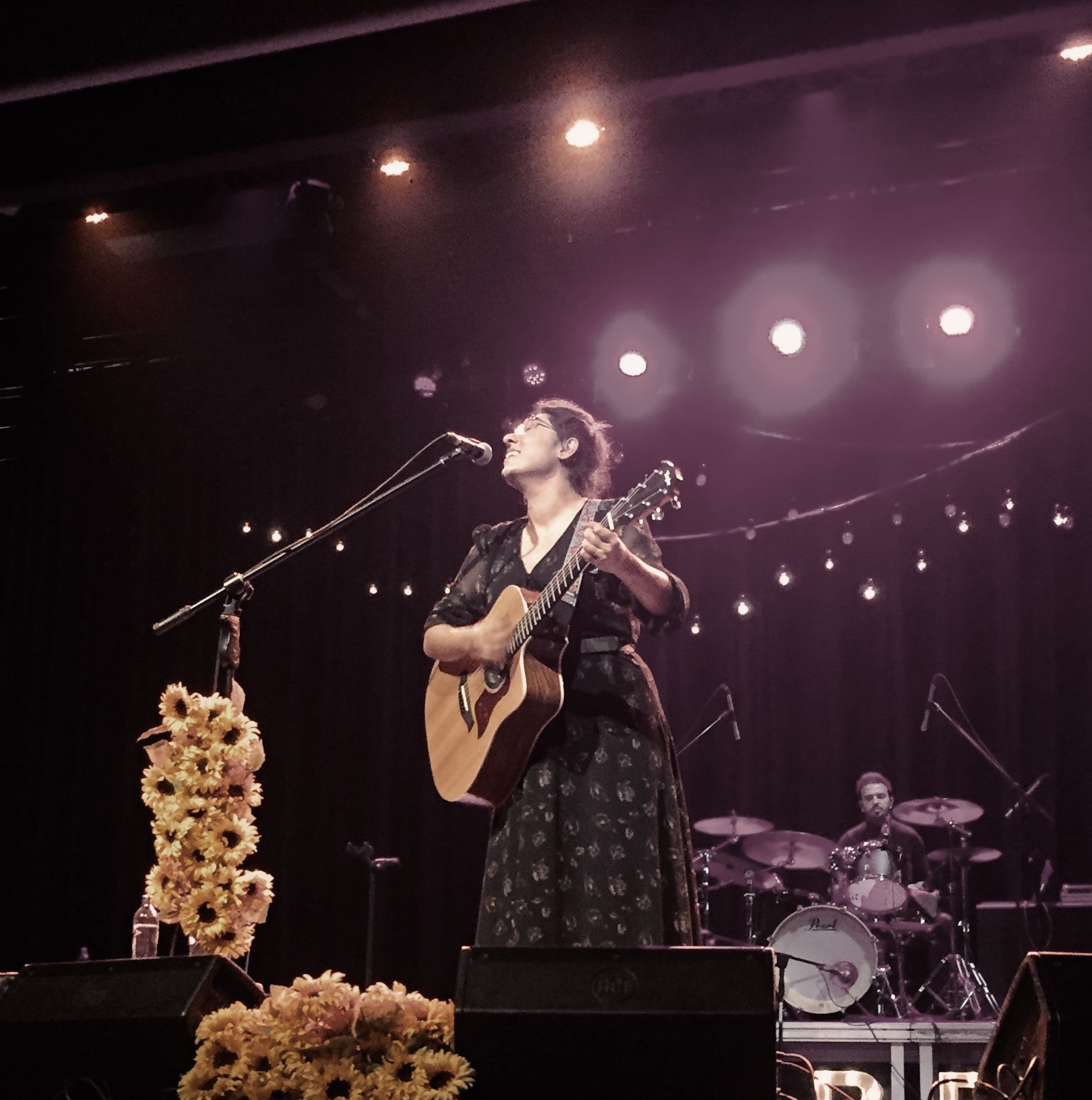
Mall of Istanbul's MOI Sahne, a theater with 700 seats in Başakşehir.

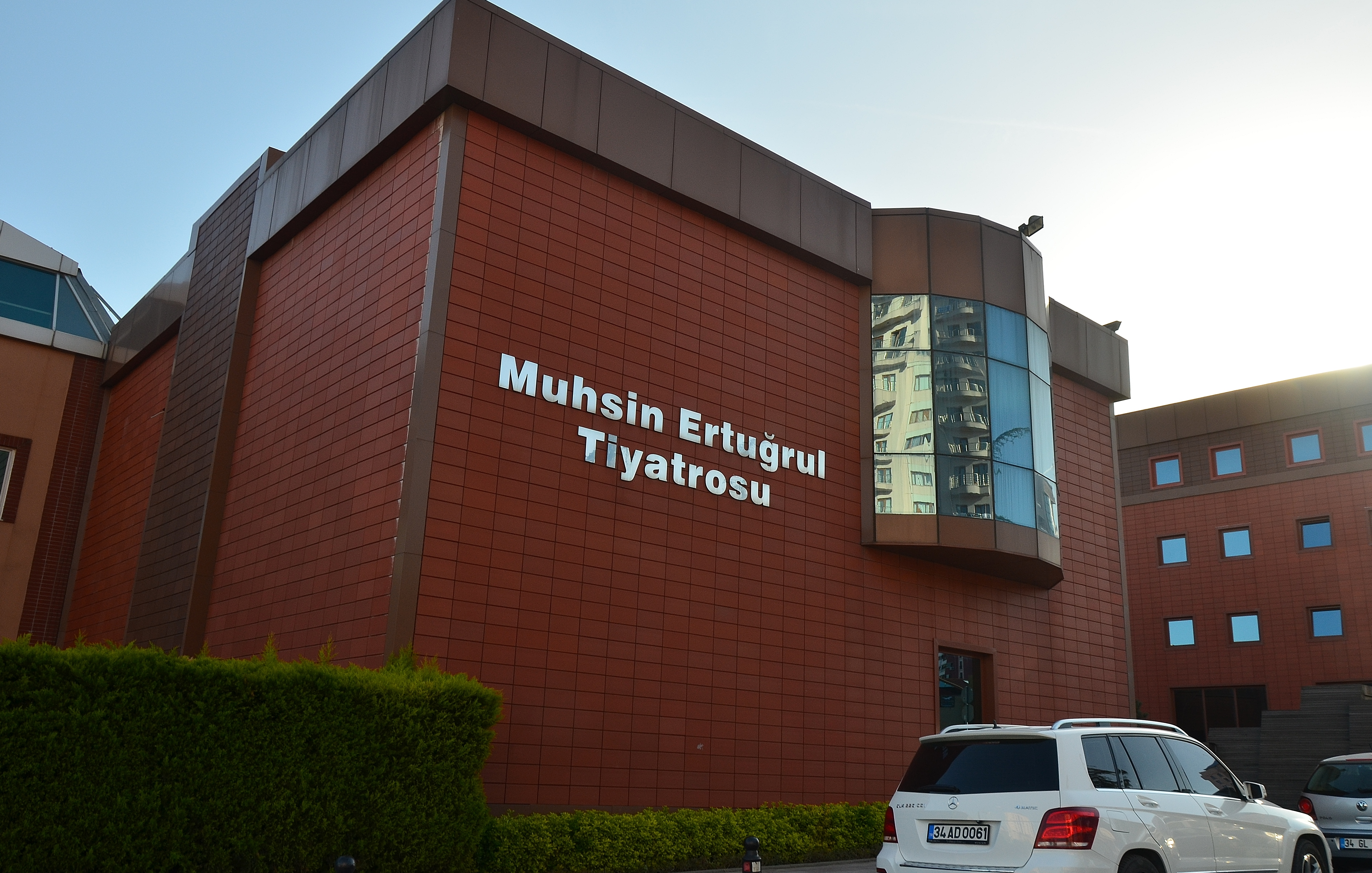
Bahçeşehir Muhsin Ertuğrul Theatre, is a theatre venue located in Bahçeşehir quarter of Başakşehir.

Başakşehir is home to several non-governmental organizations, including the Bahçeşehirliler Derneği, founded in 1997, which aims to serve the local community. The district also hosts the Bahçeşehir Rotary Club, and the Bahçeşehir Musıki Derneği, a classical Turkish music association established in 1998, known for its choir, which includes citizens from Bahçeşehir.

== Education ==
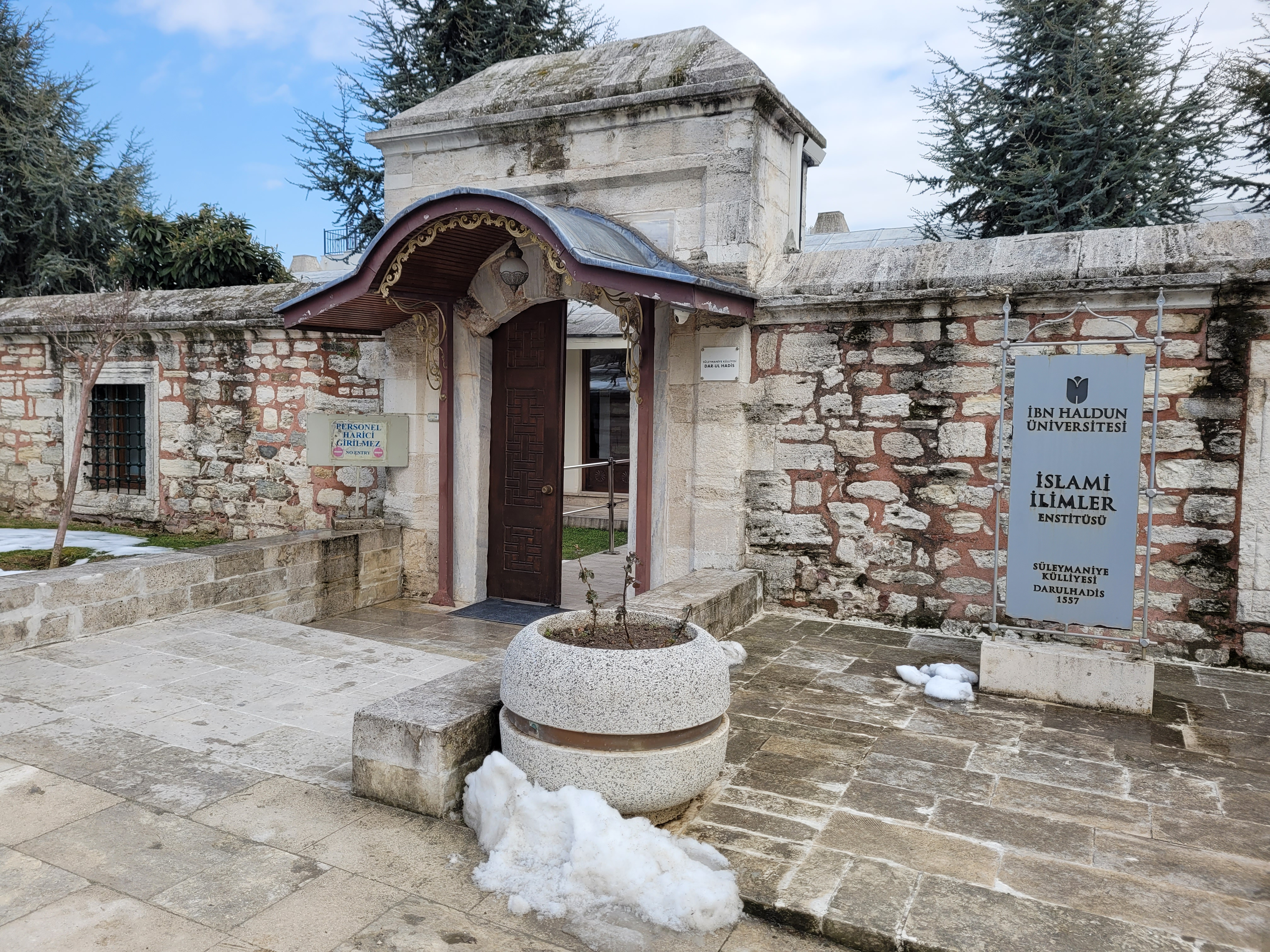
Ibn Haldun University, a private university located in Başakşehir.

Başakşehir hosts a range of educational institutions, including both public and private schools. Private schools in the district include the British International School Istanbul Bahçeşehir Campus, TED Atakent College Bahçeşehir Campus, FMV Işık Okulları Bahçeşehir Campus, Bahçeşehir College, Lycée Notre Dame de Sion Istanbul-affiliated NDS School Bahçeşehir and Başakşehir Çınar Koleji. Başakşehir is home to İstanbul Technical University İsmail Dede Efendi High School for Fine Arts. Ibn Haldun University is located in the Başakşehir, with English as the medium of instruction. Bahçeşehir University was founded in Bahçeşehir, Başakşehir in 1998. Yıldız Technical University inaugurated a university research park in Başakşehir in 2014, serving as a hub for technological research.

Public education in Başakşehir is represented by schools such as Bahçeşehir Süleyman Demirel İlkokulu, an elementary school opened by President Süleyman Demirel, and Bahçeşehir Anaokulu, which operates as an eco-school and forest school. Additionally, Başakşehir M. Emin Saraç Anadolu İmam Hatip Lisesi offers programs in English, Arabic, and Russian. The district is served by several public libraries, including Bahçeşehir Public Library, Bahçeşehir Bahçekent Teoman Duralı Library, and Başakşehir Necip Fazıl Kısakürek Library. Başakşehir Living Lab, recognized as Turkey's first Living Lab, commenced operations in 2013 and functions as an innovation and technology center, as well as an educational hub, under the Başakşehir Municipality, focusing on the development of products and services in information technology and design as a member of the European Network of Living Labs.

== Sport ==
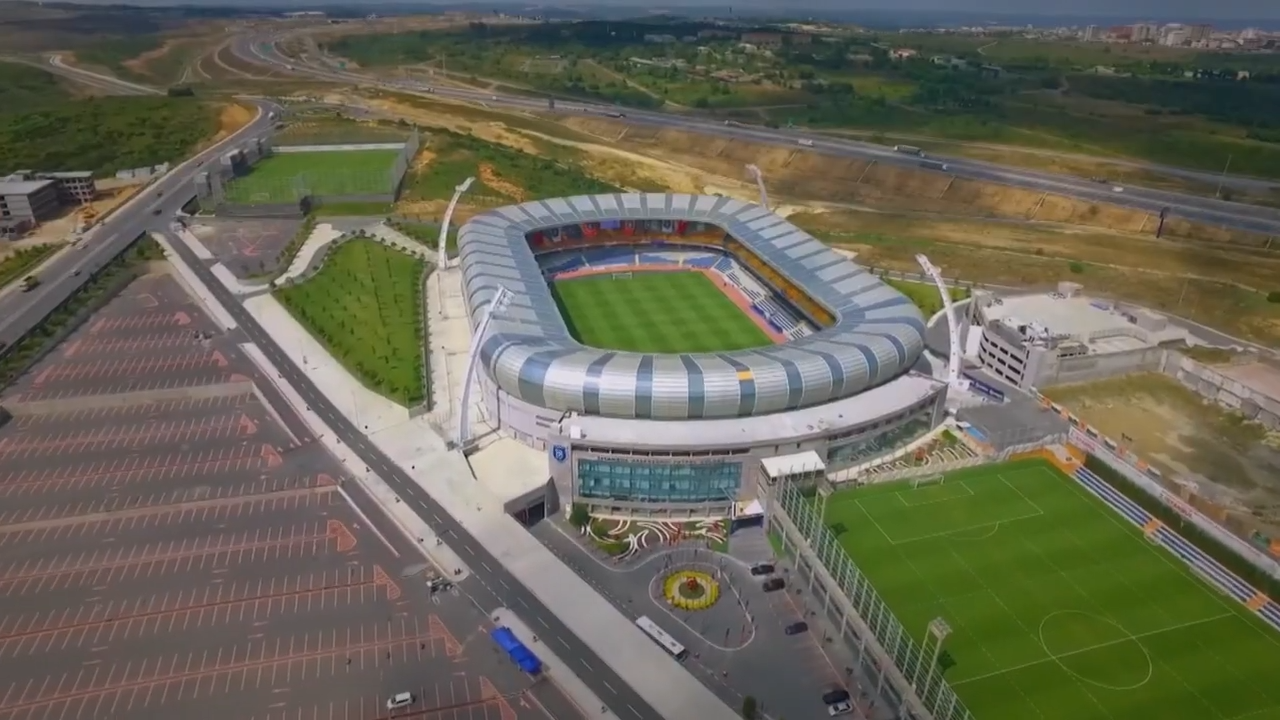
Başakşehir Fatih Terim Stadium, the home ground for İstanbul Başakşehir F.K.

Başakşehir is home to İstanbul Başakşehir F.K., a football club competing in the Turkish Süper Lig. The district also features prominent sports venues, including Atatürk Olympic Stadium, one of the largest stadiums in Turkey, and Başakşehir Fatih Terim Stadium, which serves as the home ground for Başakşehir F.K. Bahçeşehir Tennis Club (Turkish: Bahçeşehir Tenis Kulübü) offers a variety of tennis facilities, including 1 wall court, 2 outdoor courts, and 2 indoor courts.

== Transportation ==
Başakşehir is well-connected to other parts of Istanbul through an extensive transportation network, including many railway lines and bus services. The district is served by the M3 Metro Line, which connects Başakşehir to other districts. Additionally, the M7 Metro Line is planned to have a station in Başakşehir in 2028, further improving connectivity within the city. The M9 Metro Line enhances access by linking the district to Ataköy, with stops in Başakşehir. The M11 Metro Line will provide a direct link between Başakşehir and Istanbul Airport when it's opened in early 2026. In addition, the Halkalı-Bahçeşehir Rail System extends through the district, indirectly providing rail service to both the European and Asian sides of Istanbul. For bus transportation, there are direct double-decker bus routes from Bahçeşehir to key locations in Istanbul, including Taksim, Yenikapı, Bakırköy and Mecidiyeköy.

== Composition ==
There are 10 neighbourhoods in Başakşehir District:

- Altınşehir
- Bahçeşehir 1. Kısım
- Bahçeşehir 2. Kısım
- Başak
- Başakşehir
- Güvercintepe
- Kayabaşı
- Şahintepesi
- Şamlar
- Ziya Gökalp

== See also ==
- Başakşehir Çam and Sakura City Hospital
- Atatürk Olympic Stadium
- Istanbul Başakşehir F.K.
- Ibn Haldun University
- Ispartakule Railway Station
- Mall of Istanbul
- Bahçeşehir College
