= Başakşehir Çam and Sakura City Hospital =

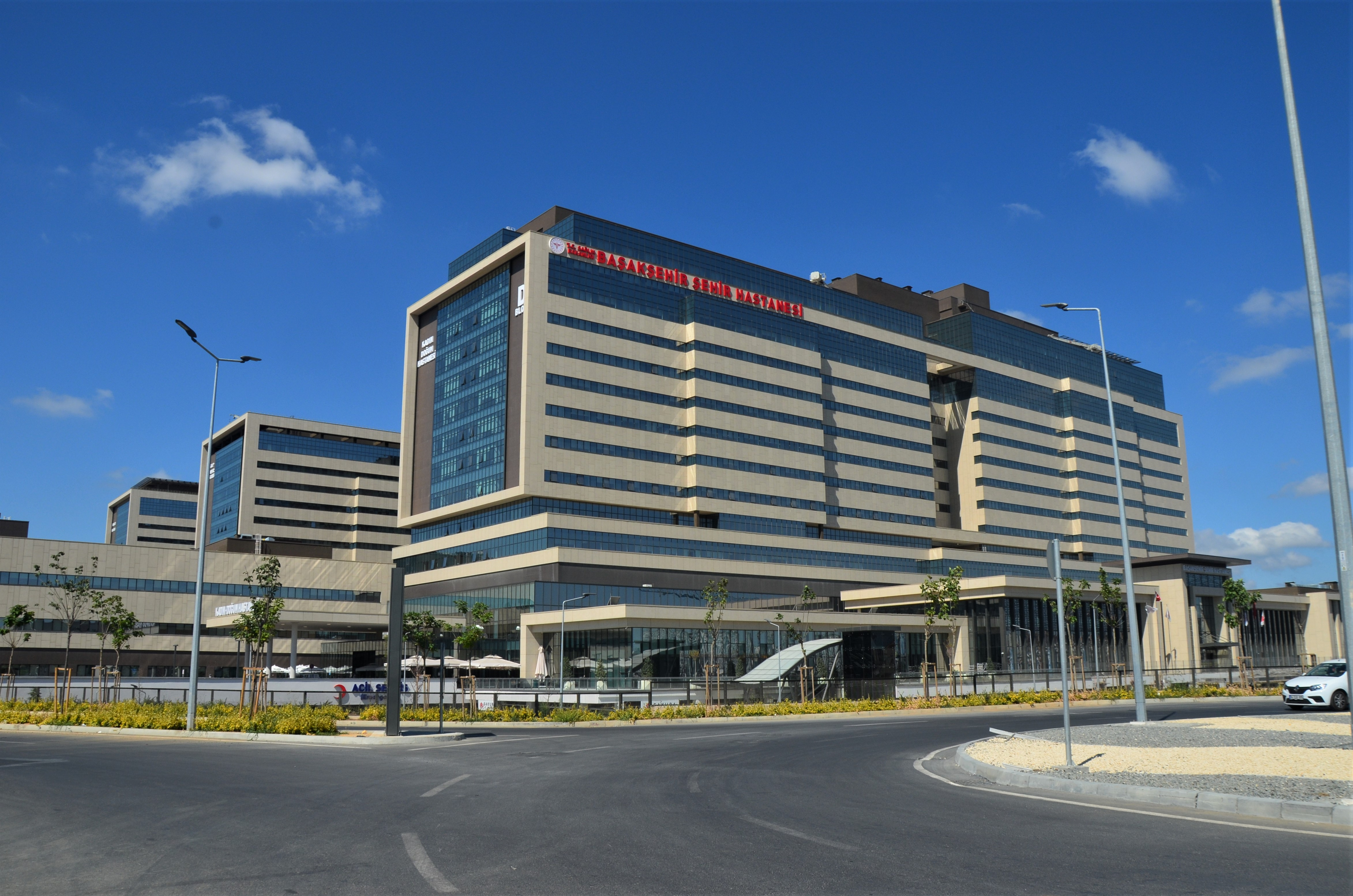
- Başakşehir Çam and Sakura City Hospital in Başakşehir, Istanbul Province.

- Location of the hospital in Istanbul, Turkey

Geography
- Location: Olimpiyat Blv Rd, Başakşehir, Istanbul, Turkey
- Coordinates: 41°06′11″N 28°46′35″E

Organisation
- Type: District General
- Patron: Ministry of Health

Services
- Beds: 2,682

Helipads
- Helipad: 3

History
- Constructed: 2016
- Opened: 20 April 2020; 6 years ago

Links
- Lists: Hospitals in Turkey

Başakşehir Çam and Sakura City Hospital (Turkish: Başakşehir Çam ve Sakura Şehir Hastanesi), also known as Başakşehir City Hospital, is a large district general hospital in Başakşehir district of Istanbul, Turkey. It was developed jointly by Turkish and Japanese cooperation, symbolized in the name with Çam ve Sakura (English: Pine and Cherry Blossom). The hospital complex opened in May 2020.

== History ==
Başakşehir Çam and Sakura City Hospital is Turkey's third biggest healthcare investment project. It was conducted by the Ministry of Health in a public–private partnership (PPP) model, financed by nine different global finance corporations including the Bank of Japan and Nippon Export and Investment Insurance. The cost of the project was 163 billion Japanese yen (approx. US$1.5 billion). It was developed by the Turkish Rönesans Healthcare and the Japanese Sojitz Corporation. The construction of the hospital complex began in 2016 and was completed in 2020.

The healthcare investment project was honored with the "PPP Contract of the Year" prize within Thomson Reuters Foundation's Project Finance International Awards.

The first section of the hospital went into service on 20 April 2020 for the treatment of COVID-19 patients only. On 21 May, the hospital's inauguration ceremony was held with Turkish President Recep Tayyip Erdoğan and Heath Minister Fahrettin Koca. Japanese Prime Minister Shinzo Abe joined the event via video conference. The Turkish–Japanese cooperation of the project was marked in its official name: with çam, Turkish for 'pine', and sakura, Japanese for 'cherry blossom', symbolizing the Turkish and Japanese contributions to the hospital.

== Characteristics ==
The hospital complex was built on a plot of 789 daa (789,000 m^{2}) and has a total interior floorspace of 1,021 daa (1,021,000 m^{2}). The main hospital comprises six blocks built around a core structure, all of which are constructed on a base of over 2,000 seismic base isolators, designed to withstand earthquakes without disruptions to service. According to Building Design+Construction magazine, it was the largest base-isolated building in the world at the time of its opening. The complex has three helipads and a total parking capacity of 8,134. The complex also has 171 daa (171,000 m^{2}) of landscaping, planted with pine and cherry trees.

The hospital complex consists of eight special hospitals. The six blocks of the main hospital house general medicine, pediatrics, orthopedics and neurology, women's medicine and maternity, cardiac and vascular surgery, and oncology. Two adjacent buildings house the physical medicine and rehabilitation and psychiatry hospitals. At the time of its commissioning, it had a total of 725 examination rooms and 2,682 beds, which can be converted for intensive care medicine when needed. It features 28 delivery rooms, 90 operating theaters, a 16-bed burn center and a total of 426 intensive care unit (ICU) beds for newborn babies and adults. About 4,300 medical personnel, 4,050 service personnel and 810 management personnel work in the hospital complex, where up to 32,700 patients can be served daily.

Hospital bed capacity
Hospital	Beds
General Hospital	469
Cardiovascular Diseases Hospital	327
Neurology and Orthopedics Hospital	311
Children's Hospital	521
Women's and Maternity Hospital	359
Oncology Hospital	367
Psychiatry Hospital	128
Physical medicine and Rehabilitation Hospital	200
Total	2,682

== Location and access ==
Başakşehir City Hospital is situated at Olimpiyat Bulvarı Yolu (English: Olympic Boulevard Road) in Başakşehir district of Istanbul, Turkey. The hospital is accessible by city line buses, including MK22 Taşoluk Peronlar-Fenertepe to Başakşehir Metrokent, 79E Kayabaşı Kiptaş-Kayaşehir to Eminönü, 79B Kayaşehir to Bakırköy, MK22 Taşoluk Peronlar-Fenertepe to Başakşehir Metrokent, and 78F Başakşehir-Fenertepe to Metrokent. It is also accessible via the M3 Metro Line, which stops at the Şehir Hastanesi station near the hospital.

== See also ==
- Ankara Bilkent City Hospital
