= Ispartakule railway station =

Railway station in Başakşehir, Turkey

ISPARTAKULE

General information
- Location: İstasyon Çk, Bahçeşehir 1. Kısım Mah., 34488; Başakşehir/Istanbul; Turkey
- Coordinates: 41.0630°N 28.6992°E
- System: TCDD regional rail station
- Owner: Turkish State Railways
- Operator: TCDD Taşımacılık
- Line: Istanbul–Pythio railway
- Platforms: 2 (1 side platform, 1 island platform)
- Tracks: 3

Construction
- Structure type: At-grade

History
- Opened: 1873
- Electrified: 1993; 25 kV AC, 50 Hz OHLE

Services
Preceding station	TCDD Taşımacılık	Following station
Çatalca towards Kapıkule	Istanbul–Kapıkule	Istanbul Terminus
Çatalca towards Uzunköprü	Istanbul–Uzunköprü	Istanbul Terminus
Bahçeşehir Terminus	B2 Suburban	Halkalı Terminus
Location

Ispartakule railway station (Turkish: Ispartakule istasyonu) is a station in Başakşehir, Turkey, in the western suburbs of Istanbul. TCDD Taşımacılık operates two daily regional trains from Istanbul to Kapıkule and Çerkezköy, which stops at Ispartakule. The station consists of a side platform and a narrow island platform servicing three tracks.

The station was opened in 1873 by the Oriental Railway.
