= Yarımburgaz Cave =

Cave in Turkey

Yarimburgaz Cave
- Yarımburgaz Mağarası
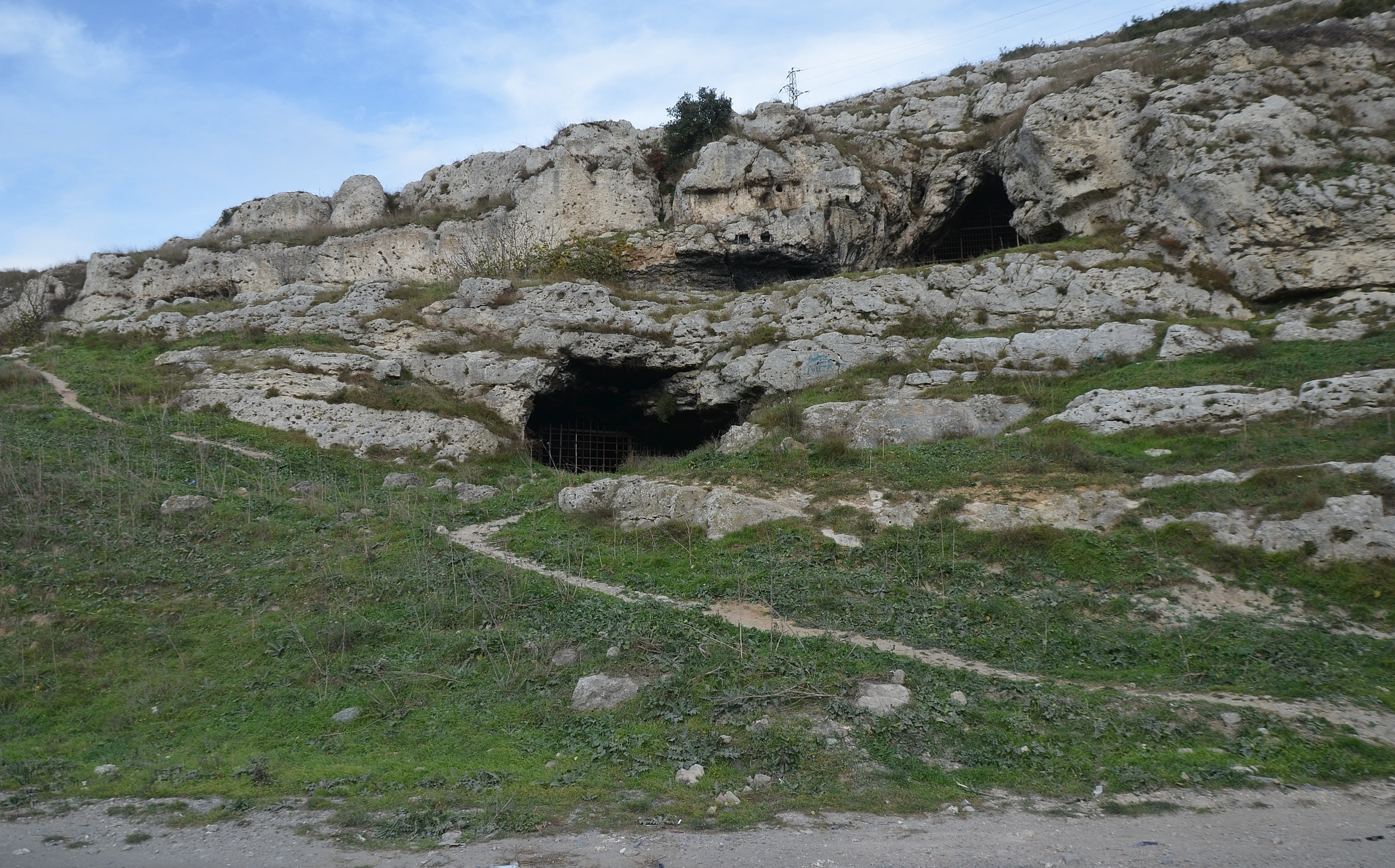
- A view of Yarımburgaz Cave.

- Location within Istanbul
- Location: Altınşehir, Başakşehir, Istanbul, Turkey
- Coordinates: 41°04′31″N 28°44′29″E
- Length: 500 m (1,600 ft) (lower cave); 52 m (171 ft) (upper cave)
- Elevation: 11.5 m (38 ft) (lower cave); 18.5 m (61 ft) (upper cave)
- Entrances: Two

Yarimburgaz Cave (Turkish: Yarımburgaz Mağarası) is a cave of significant archaeological and paleontological importance, located in eastern Thrace and within Istanbul Province, Turkey.

== Location ==
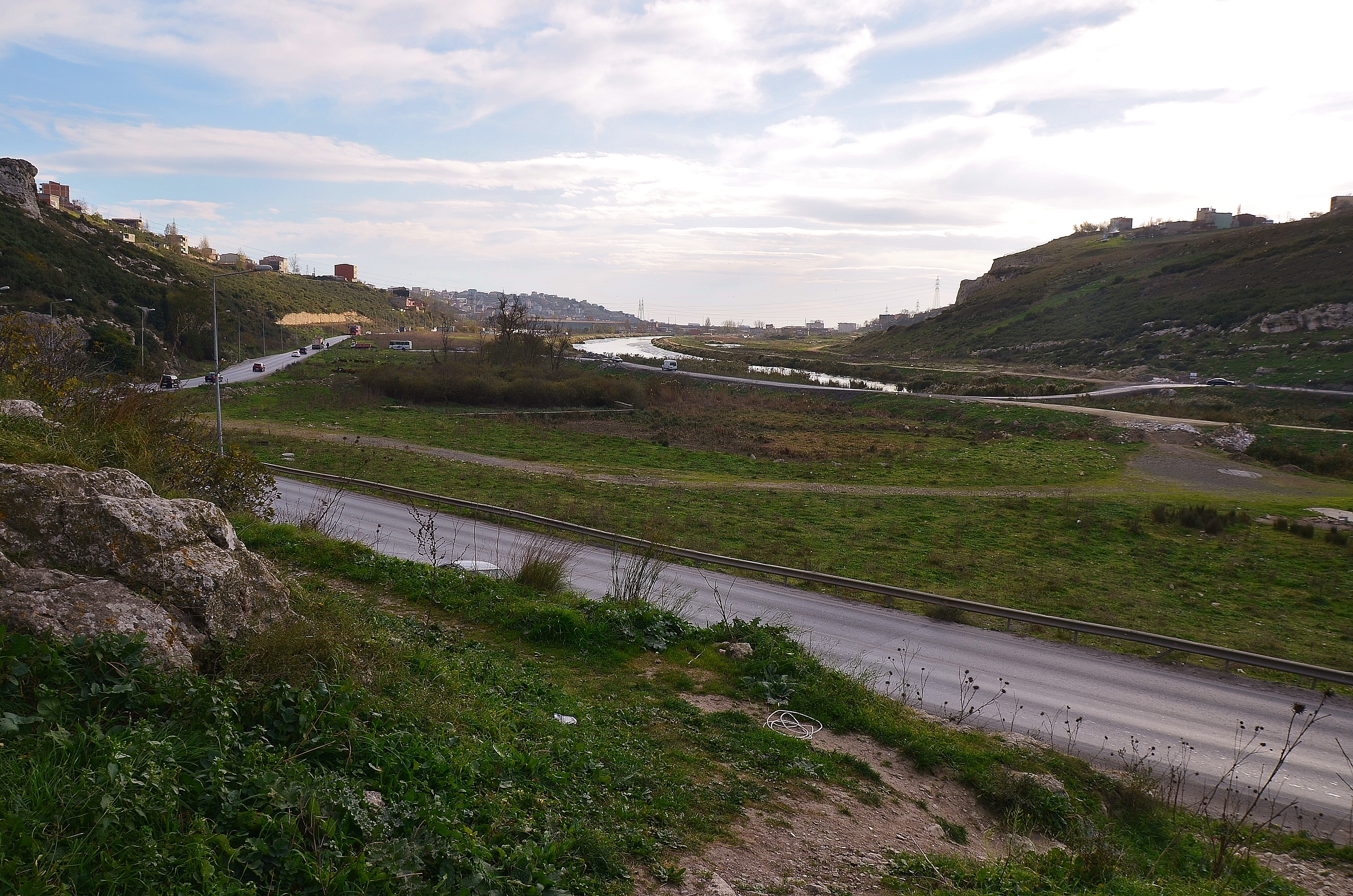
A view to the Sazlıdere Valley and Lake Küçükçekmece seen from the cave.

Yarımburgaz Cave is approximately 20 km (12 mi) west of the city of Istanbul, and about 1.5 km (0.93 mi) north of Lake Küçükçekmece and south of Sazlıdere Dam. It is situated in a locality known today as Altınşehir, within the neighborhood of Güvercintepe in Başakşehir district.

== Geology and cave formation ==
The cave was formed as a result of a subterranean river eroding and dissolving an ancient Eocene limestone formation. It has two entrances, one above the other. The lower entrance is at an altitude of 11.5 m (38 ft) AMSL, and the upper entrance at 7 m (23 ft). The cave opens onto the eastern bank of the Sazlıdere creek, which empties into Lake Küçükçekmece. The entrances face southwards overlooking Sazlıdere Valley. The lower cave is a long meandering tunnel that extends deep into the hillside at a length of 500 m (1,600 ft), and forks into two narrower tunnels around 240 m (790 ft) from the mouth. The upper cave extends only 52 m (171 ft) into the bedrock. The upper cave chamber is 15 m (49 ft) wide and 10 m (33 ft) in height near the entrance. The two chambers are connected internally by a short, sloping passage approximately 25 m (82 ft) from the entrance.

== Scientific research ==
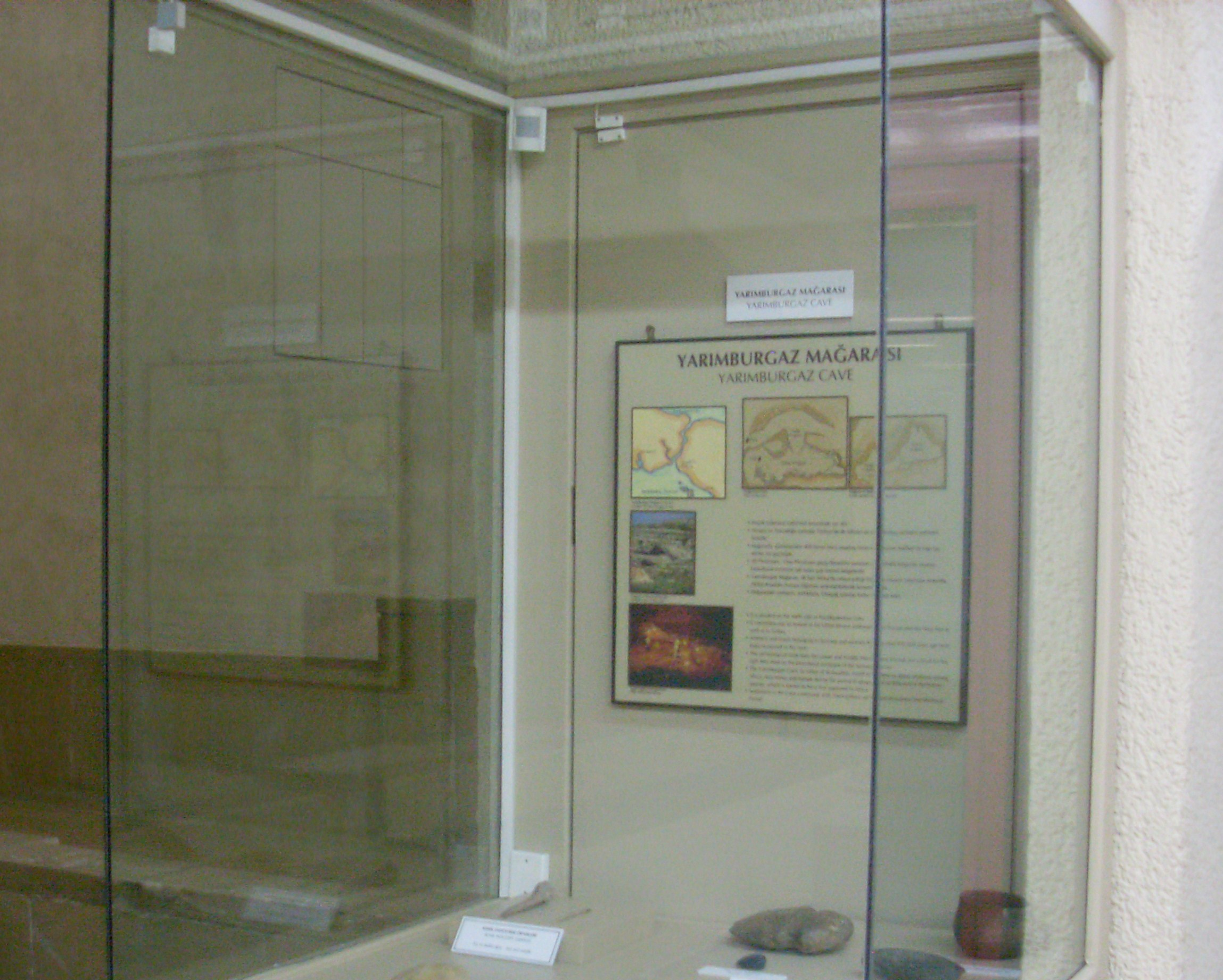
Artifacts from Yarımburgaz Cave displayed at Istanbul Archaeology Museums.

The cave is an important fossil and archaeological site whose deposits span several cultural and geologic periods, and which have been researched by archeologists, paleontologists, geoarchaeologists and biospeleologists. Scientific exploration of the cave began in the mid-19th century, focusing mainly on its geological characteristics and setting. Recognition of the cave's importance for Holocene and Pleistocene prehistory of Turkey came only in the 1960s and after, based on several test pits that explored the Chalcolithic occupation in the cave. Excavation work in the 1980s was both more extensive and systematic. The first campaign was a salvage excavation conducted in 1986 by archaeologists from the University of Istanbul, which tested both cave chambers but focused mainly on the Byzantine, Chalcolithic and Neolithic occupations in the upper cave. An early Paleolithic presence was also recognized, though highly disturbed in the upper cave but apparently intact in the lower cave. The second excavation campaign from 1988 through 1990 was a collaboration between archaeologists from the University of Istanbul and University of California-Berkeley, which focused on the Paleolithic components in the lower cave and complete characterization of the 5 meter deep stratigraphy of the site, funded by the National Geographic Society.

== Archaeological sequence and formation processes ==
During the Byzantine era, a church was carved into the walls of the upper cave, and a monastery was built outside the cave mouth. These alterations resulted in major disturbance to underlying layers containing prehistoric material. In all, the upper cave preserves relatively intact traces of human occupations dating to the Bronze Age, Chalcolithic, Neolithic, and scant disturbed traces of Upper Paleolithic and earlier deposits. Pottery finds from the Chalcolithic and Neolithic ages indicate links between the Balkans and the Aegean and Anatolian cultures via Thrace, and continuous human use of the Upper Cave from about 5500 BC onward.

Below these cultural layers is a stratified sand and gravel deposit that is over 3.0 m thick and does not contain artifacts. This deposit represents a former high sea level (marine transgression) that flooded into the cave mouth; it is a beach sand from the Last Interglacial period,. Paleolithic artifacts occur within the stratigraphically intact sediments under the beach layer in the lower cave, especially in the spacious area near the entrance. Paleontological and archaeological findings indicate revolving use of the cave by early humans and several species of non-human animals, especially cave bears. The faunal assemblages include bones of diverse herbivores and carnivores, marine and freshwater molluscs, microfauna, as well as chipped stone artifacts made from flint, chopper tools and hammerstones from quartzite, as well as manuports. Common large mammal remains include late Middle Pleistocene cave bears (Ursus deningeri), horses (Equus caballus), wild boar (Sus scrofa), fallow deer (Dama dama), roe deer (Capreolus capreolus), giant deer (Megaloceros), wild cattle (Bos/Bison), gazelles (Gazella), wild goats (Capra), and less commonly carnivores such as wolves (Canis), foxes (Vulpes), large cats (Panthera), wildcat (Felis), and hyenas (Crocuta).

The micromammal assemblages from the lower cave provide important chronological and ecological indicators. The evolutionary stage of the steppe lemming, Lagurus transiens/lagurus, indicates a Middle Pleistocene age. Species composition is relatively uniform through the Paleolithic deposit, with several species of Middle Pleistocene bats (Chiroptera), including horseshoe bats (Rhinolophus), mouse-eared bats (Myotis), long-eared bats (Plecotus), and bent-winged bats (Miniopterus)..

Attempts to determine the age of the Paleolithic occupation have met with some mixed results, but the weight of the combined evidence from geostratigraphy (including the site's low elevation and proximity to the sea), ESR dating, and biostratigraphy suggests that alternations in hominin and bear presence in the cave occurred within the later part of the Middle Pleistocene, specifically Marine Isotope Stages 7 or 8 (roughly 250,000 and 180,000 years before present).

Bear skeletal remains dominate the large mammal remains in the lower cave, with more than 5000 fossil bones and teeth, mostly of cave bears (a late form of Ursus deningeri) along with lower numbers of brown bears (a relatively early form of Ursus arctos). The cave bear and other large mammal remains have been subjected to extensive scientific study, including taphonomic analyses, to understand the peculiar co-occurrence of more than 40 relatively complete bear skeletons with early Paleolithic artifacts. The metric and morphological characteristics of the Deningeri cave bears provide important chronological indicators pointing to the late Middle Pleistocene geologic period. The cave bear fossils from the lower cave represent a population in evolutionary transition between two chrono-species, Ursus deningeri and U. spelaeus, that existed during a relatively dry climate interval. Stable carbon isotopes in cave and brown bear molar enamel indicates strictly C3 vegetation in the bear diets.

The lithic assemblage bridges two broad chronological and cultural "taxonomic" units, the late Lower and early Middle Paleolithic. Late Middle Pleistocene technologies in western Asia and southeastern Europe varied greatly at this time, such that no simple unilineal chronological scheme is suitable. The absence of Levallois flakes, cores and production debris suggests that the lithic assemblage predates the spread of Middle Paleolithic Levallois technology during or immediately before MIS 6.

Although bear remains and Paleolithic stone artifacts co-occur within the same deposit and display essentially similar horizontal distributions, there are no tool marks on the bear bones that would indicate hunting by the hominin residents. Moreover, there is only limited evidence of domestic activities inside Yarımburgaz Cave apart from the presence of stone tools; no hearths or traces of burning damage on bones or stone tools was found. Hominins visited the cave for short periods, arriving with mainly flake tools made of flint in hand. Some of these artifacts were subsequently abandoned in the cave, and replaced on-site by tools made from other flint types, quartz and quartzite taken from local outcrops.

The co-occurrence of bear remains and Paleolithic stone artifacts in the lower cave is therefore the product of a palimpsest formation effect. Denning bears prepared their beds by digging and scraping sediments and whatever material they contained to create shallow syrface nests each autumn. Some individuals perished during hibernation due to starvation, illness and/or predation by other bears, and their skeletal remains were added to the sediments. Hominins also visited the cave, perhaps mainly in other seasons, or briefly and without making fire during the bear hibernation season. They left artifacts and some bones of game animals behind. Over thousands of years, residues from hominins and bears became homogenized within the deposits as bears remade their beds over many generations.

Yarımburgaz as a rare example of a stratified Paleolithic cave site in Turkish Thrace, and it is one of few late Middle Pleistocene sites known in all of Anatolia. Some of the artifacts found in Yarımburgaz Cave are exhibited in the Istanbul Archaeology Museums.

In 2001, Yarımburgaz Cave was declared an archaeological-nature reserve of first grade. It is also listed as "Cultural Property under Enhanced Protection".

== Recent human impacts ==
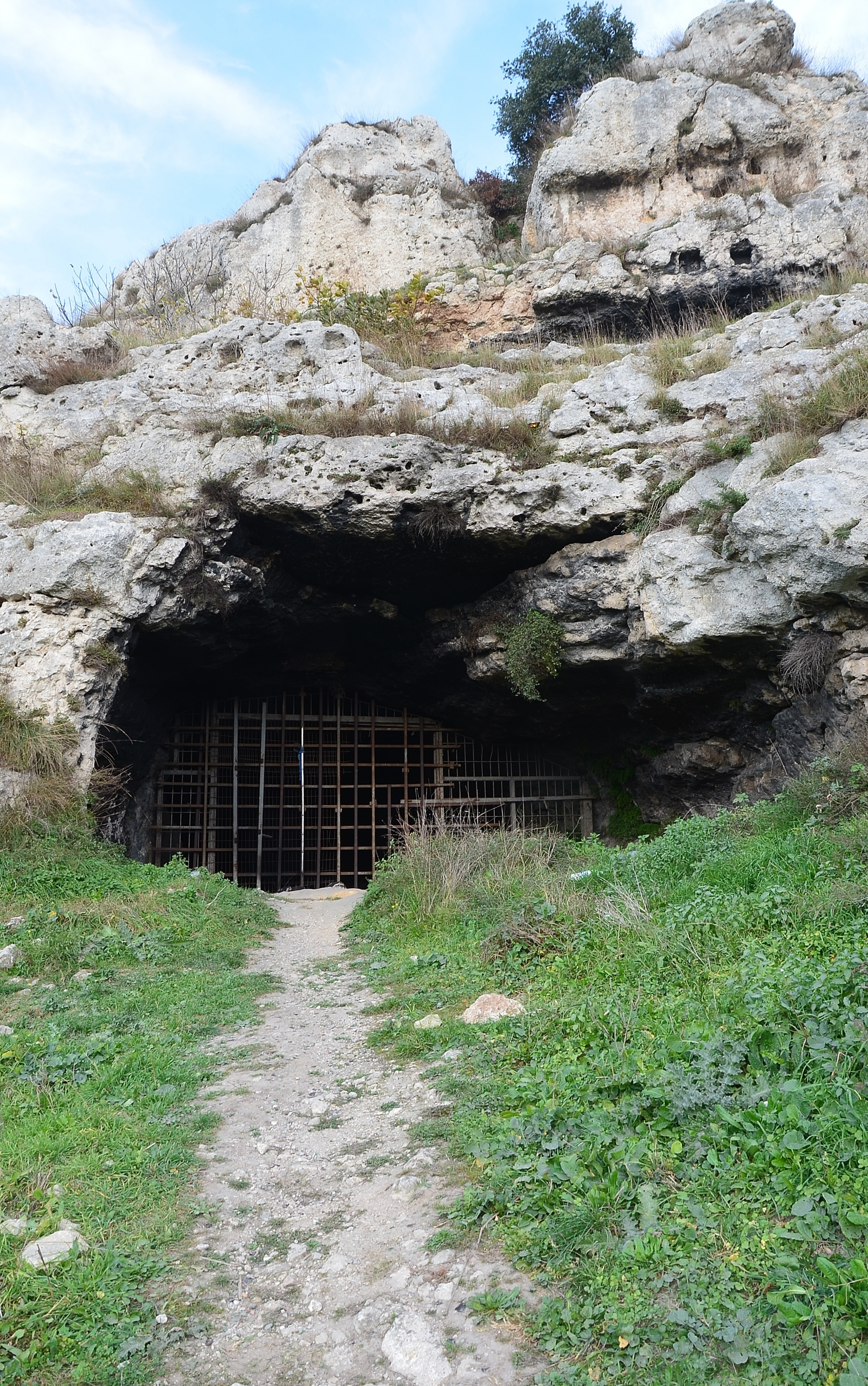
Barred main entrance of lower cave.

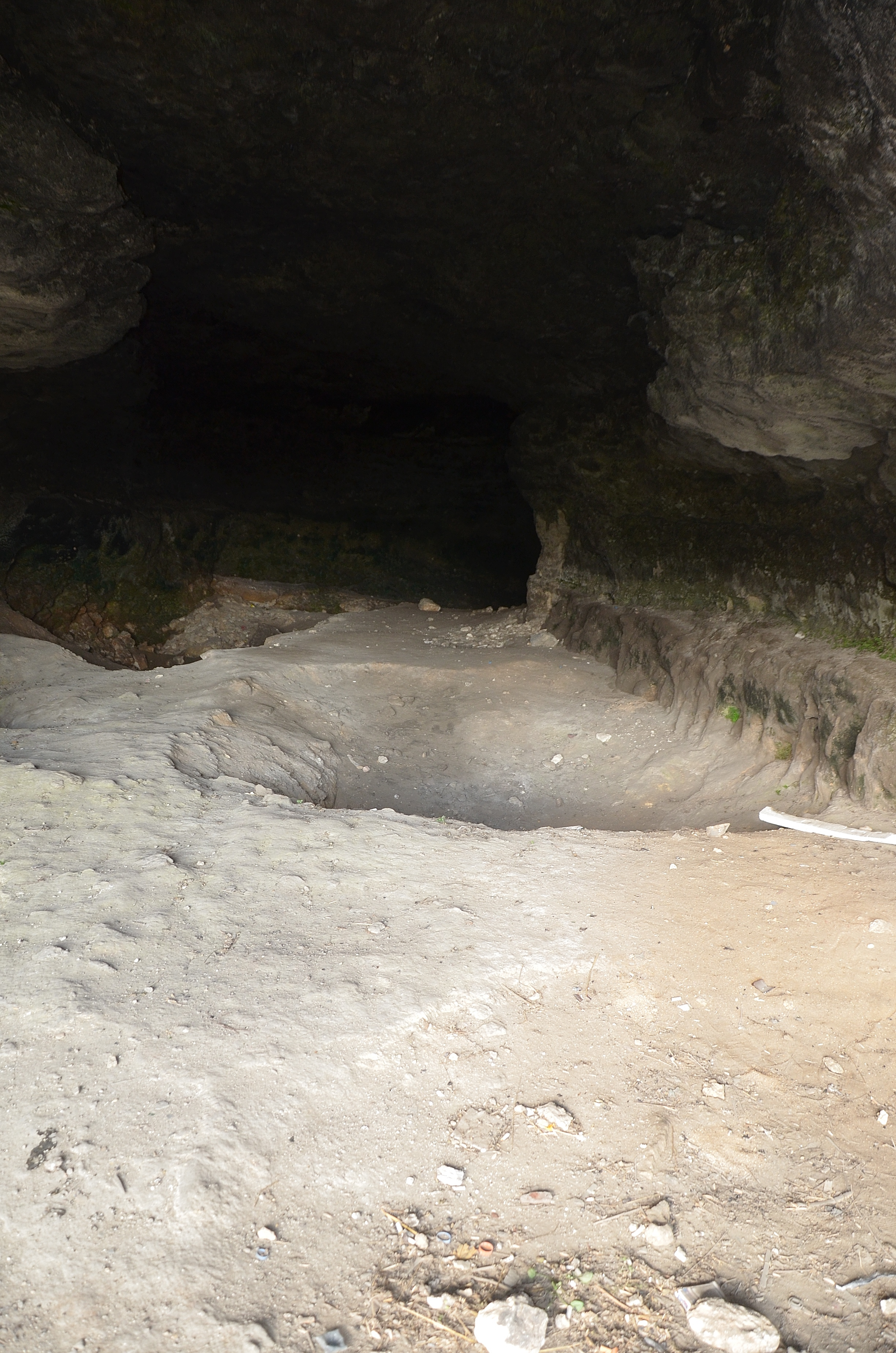
A view of the cave inside at the main entrance of lower cave.

Historic use of the upper cave dates to Byzantine and later times. The upper cave deposits were destroyed in historic and recent time by treasure hunting and illicit digging, which left 2–3 m (6.6–9.8 ft) deep pits.

During the last two decades, the cave suffered serious, irreversible damage caused by the external interactions of humans. Following scientific excavations inside the cave, and the related publications in the 1990s, the cave gained wide popularity. For this reason, it was brought to the attention of several picnickers, treasure hunters, illegal explorers, amateur speleologists and archaeologists due to its past use as a historic cave-church and its proximity to the city center. In order to prevent further damage, the cave was closed off with iron bar gates during the scientific excavations between 1988 and 1990. However, because of neglect by the respective authorities, the gates lost their function in later years, and the cave would inevitably become a shelter frequented by drug users and prostitutes, who littered it. Currently, the cave walls are painted and scratched with graffiti.

To establish a mushroom farm inside the cave, the cave grounds were leveled by a grader. The mouth of the cave was enlarged even to enable the grader's entry.

The cave was also used several times as a setting in filmmaking and television productions that left permanent modifications inside the cave. The cave featured in the 1971 movie Ali Baba ve Kırk Haramiler (English: "Ali Baba and the Forty Thieves"), based on the folk tale Ali Baba, with a role as the treasure cave that opens with the magic words "open sesame" and closes off with "close sesame", respectively. For the filming of an episode of the television series Küçük Ağa (English: "Little Agha"), historic frescos on the cave walls were scratched off and removed, and some of them were painted over with exit signs. During the filming of the science-fiction movie Yorr’un Öyküsü (English: "The Story of Yorr"), a large pool was built inside the cave, which was then detonated by explosives according to the scenario. The cave also became a setting for the television comedy series Leyla ile Mecnun produced by the state-owned Turkish Radio and Television Corporation (TRT), in which fire was set to depict hell. The filming of some episodes of the television series Muhteşem Yüzyıl (English: "The Magnificent Century"), a prime-time historical soap opera, inside the cave without proper permission allegedly caused damage to the cave. As such, the Ministry of Culture and Tourism filed a complaint against the producers.

A group of local politicians inspected the cave in February 2015, and reported that the cave's protection is still neglected despite its importance and status.

== See also ==
- Lake Küçükçekmece
