= Bahçeşehir =

District in Istanbul Province, Turkey

Bahçeşehir Bahçeşehir
- District
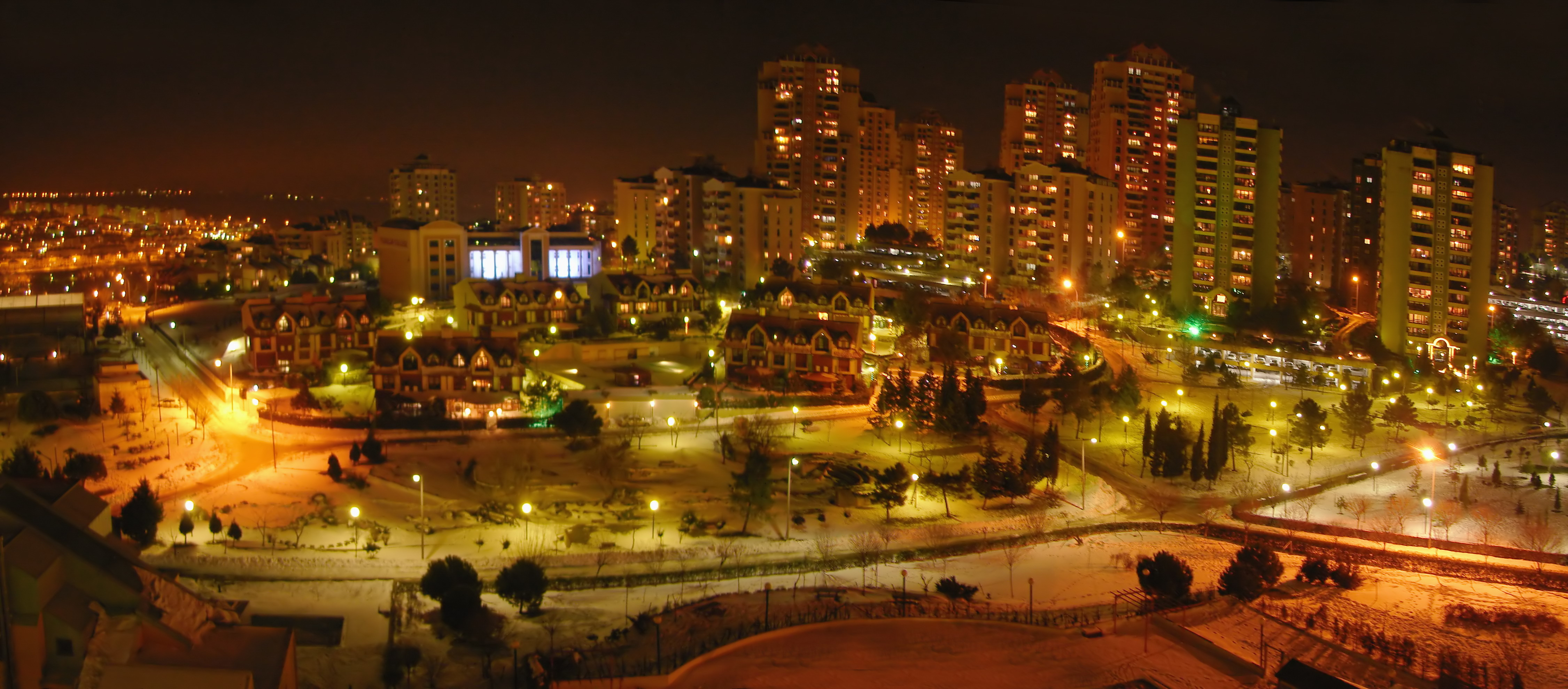
- Interactive map of Bahçeşehir
- Country: Turkey
- Province: Istanbul
- Municipalities: Başakşehir and Esenyurt

Government
  - Type: Municipality

Bahçeşehir is a district in Başakşehir and Esenyurt, İstanbul. Built to the northwest of Lake Küçükçekmece by TOKİ, it is a satellite town constructed in the last 15 years with mass housing projects. With its various business premises and offices, it also serves as a hub for business and commerce.

== History ==
The first settlements here were started in 1994 by Emlak Kredi Bank and Mesa Murol. It was planned as a project of 15,400 residences spreading across 4,703,000 m^{2}. However. the last residences were built by TOKİ.

== Municipality ==
On 12 December 1998, the municipality of Bahçeşehir District was established inside Hoşdere town. During the 1999 Turkish general election Kemal Aydın from the Motherland Party won the municipality. He stayed as mayor until 2009. In 2008, Bahçeşehir became a district of Başakşehir.

== Infrastructure ==
There are a science and technology high school, four private primary and secondary schools, two state primary schools, one state high school, two private high schools, two health centers (public and private), a police station, an amphitheater and a PTT exchange center spread across Bahçeşehir. There are also various cultural, entertainment and shopping centers serving local residents.

There are 12 square meters of green space per capita. An area of 40,000 square meters is dedicated as a plant nursery to ensure ongoing afforestation efforts. A wastewater treatment plant is also established to provide a sustainable water source for irrigating these green spaces, serving the dual purpose of preventing environmental pollution and supporting irrigation.

A 26,000-square-meter artificial lake is situated within Bahçeşehir's 300,000-square-meter redevelopment zone. The complex containing the lake houses various facilities, including restaurants, private clubs, a bar, a nightclub, a tea garden and an equestrian center.

== Transportation ==
The Bahçeşehir mass housing area is connected to every district of Istanbul through TEM Motorway (E80). The B2 Halkalı–Bahçeşehir Commuter Train also operates two daily services each way from Bahçeşehir to Halkalı railway station. Transportation within the district is primarily provided by IETT public buses.
