= Bahçeşehir College =

- Bahçeşehir Koleji
- Bahçeşehir, Başakşehir, Istanbul; Turkey

Information
- Type: Private
- Established: 1994; 32 years ago
- General Director: Devrim Karaaslanlı
- Language: Turkish, English
- Campus: Suburban area
- Color: Red Blue
- Sports: Bahçeşehir Koleji S.K.
- Affiliation: Bahçeşehir Uğur Educational Institutions (Turkish: Bahçeşehir Uğur Eğitim Kurumları)
- Website: bahcesehir.k12.tr

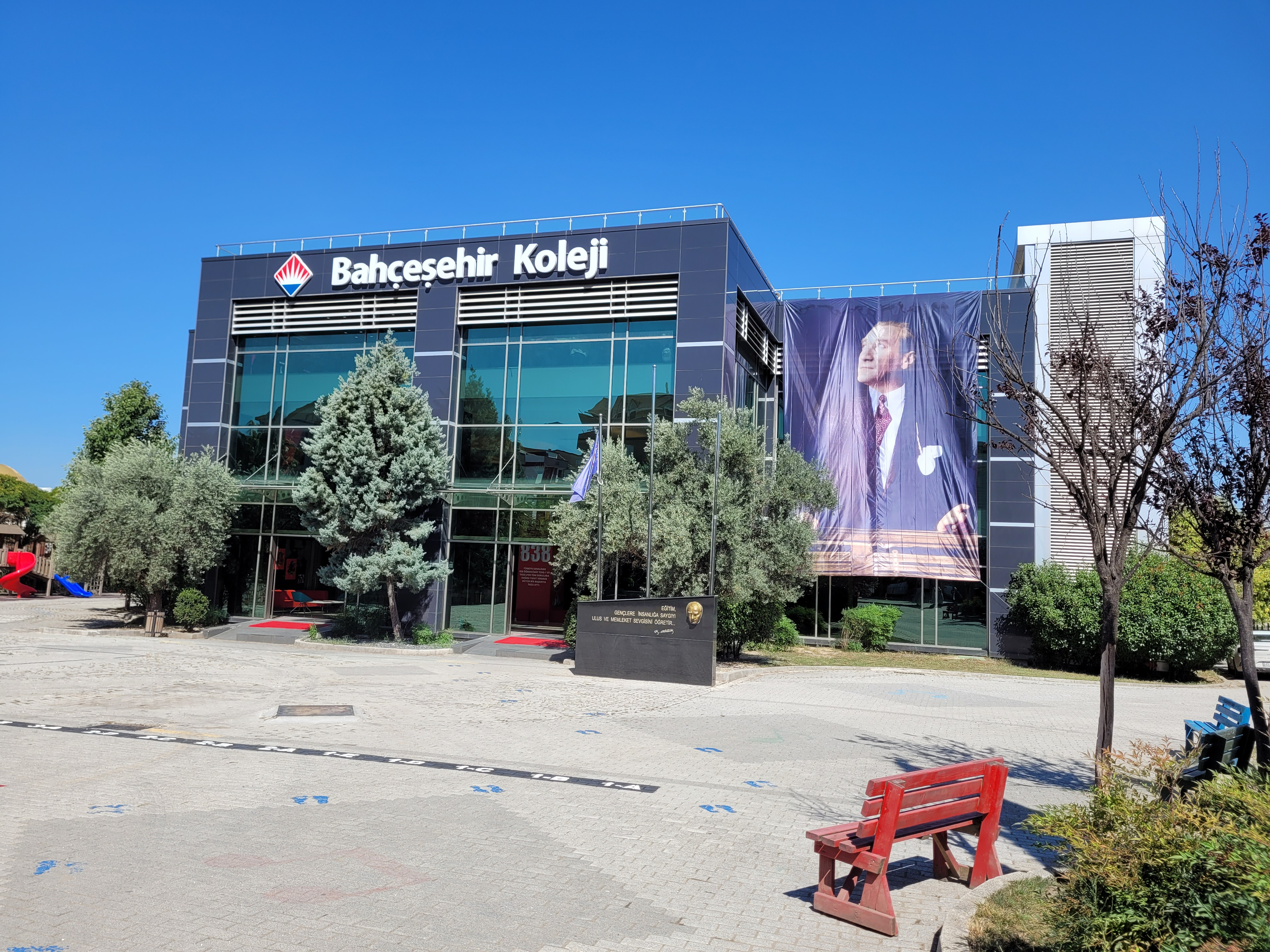
A view of Bahçeşehir College.

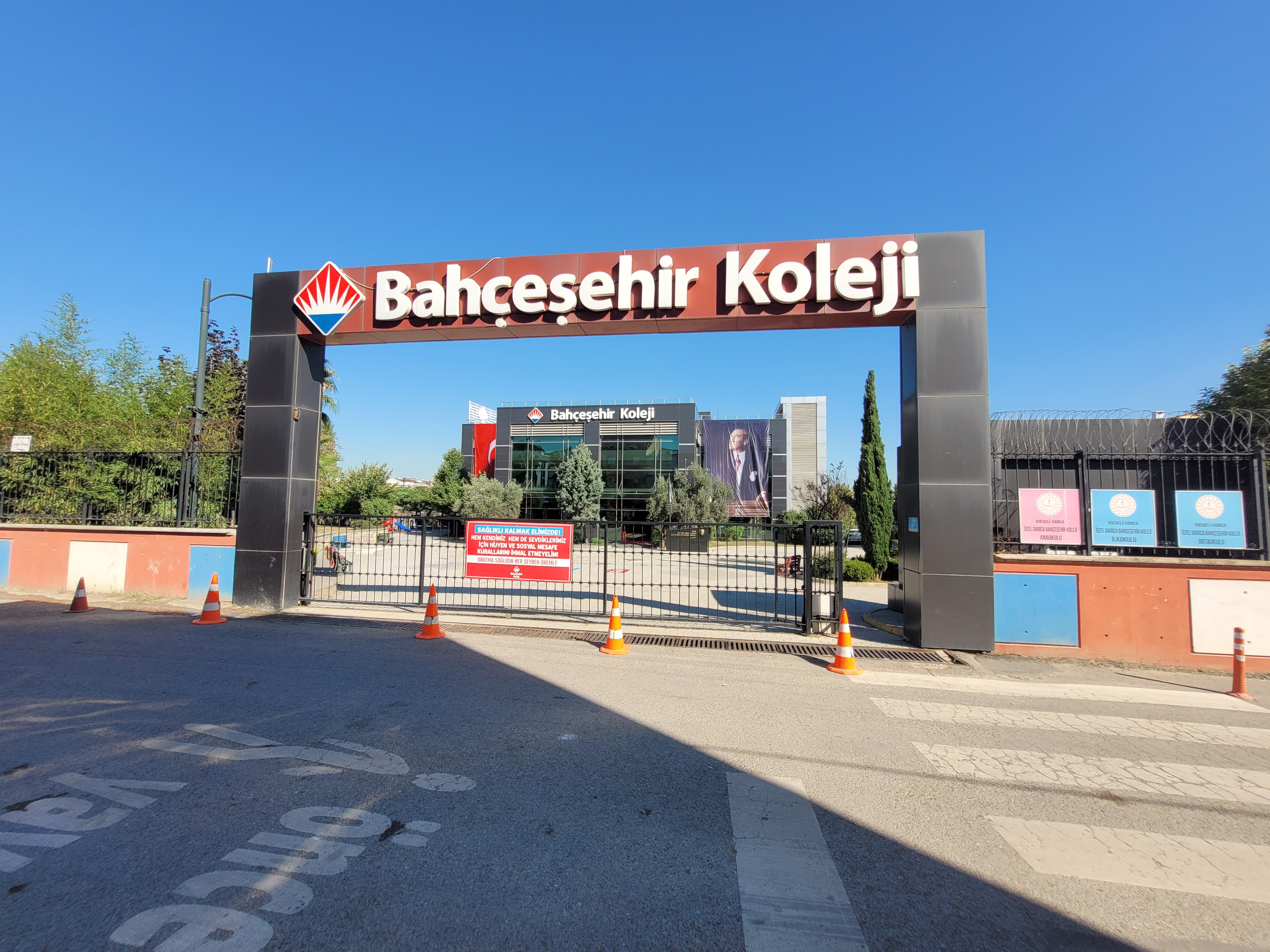
The entrance of Bahçeşehir College, Darıca Campus.

Bahçeşehir College (Turkish: Bahçeşehir Koleji) is a private school located in Turkey with 143 campuses. It was founded in 1994 by Enver Yücel. The school was founded with the mission of providing of the highest and most contemporary education, while always holding dear the principle of equality of opportunity began providing education at its site in the Istanbul suburb of Bahçeşehir in Başakşehir. Bahçeşehir College and Uğur Schools are part of the BAU Global Education Network, an international education network with institutions across three continents and 11 countries.

In 2012, Bahçeşehir Uğur Educational Institutions entered into an investment partnership with the American private equity firm Carlyle Group. From the 40 campuses of Bahçeşehir College in various cities across Turkey, Bahçeşehir Uğur alumni received acceptances from Harvard, Oxford, Stanford, and Berkeley.

== History ==
Bahçeşehir Uğur Educational Institutions commenced their educational endeavors with the establishment of the first Uğur Preparatory Center in 1968. Bahçeşehir College, a member of Bahçeşehir Uğur Educational Institutions (Turkish: Bahçeşehir Uğur Eğitim Kurumları or BUEK), began its educational activities in 1994 with the opening of its first campus in Bahçeşehir, Başakşehir in Istanbul. Bahçeşehir College expanded into Anatolia during the 2003–2004 academic year. The K-12 network further grew with the addition of Uğur Schools (Turkish: Uğur Okulları) in 2014. BAU Global Education Network is an international education network comprising nine universities, four language schools, and two K-12 schools, operating across three continents and 11 countries. There are 42 kindergartens, 27 primary schools, 16 high schools and 4 science museums within its institutional framework.

All schools within the Bahçeşehir College network adhere to consistent standards. This includes uniformity in various aspects, such as the physical learning environment, curriculum, and instructional system. The teaching and management staff benefit from the resources provided by Bahçeşehir University and its international partner institutions.

Bahçeşehir College became the first foreign school to receive the "Blue Ribbon Award for Educational Excellence" from the Schools of Excellence Association.

=== Bahçeşehir High School for Science and Technology ===
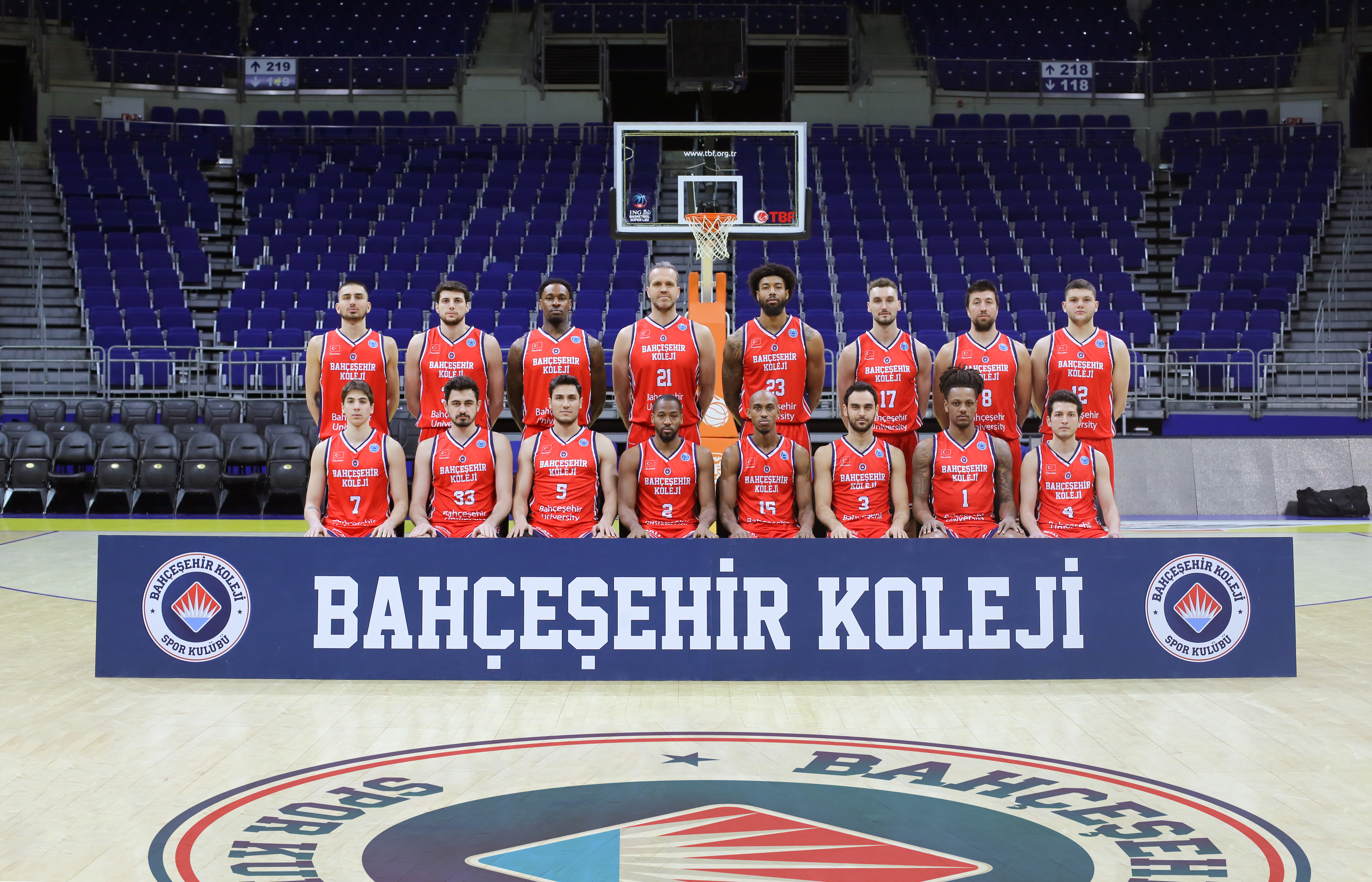
Bahçeşehir Koleji S.K. basketball team is a professional basketball club that competes in the Basketbol Süper Ligi.

Bahçeşehir High School for Science and Technology, located in the Bahçeşehir district of Başakşehir, Istanbul, is the first science and technology high school in Turkey. It was founded with the aim of producing scientifically literate graduates. For the past two years, students selected for the school have been those with the highest nationwide scores on the national secondary school placement exam, taken by over a million students in Turkey at the end of their primary education.

Scholarships are provided by institutions, organizations, and individuals to students admitted to the school. These scholarships fully cover tuition fees, lodging in school dormitories, school uniforms, books and materials, a personal laptop for each student, and a pocket money allowance.

Bahçeşehir High School for Science and Technology has successfully prepared students to complete their high school education and achieve a top 100 ranking in the Turkish national university selection examination, enabling them to secure scholarships from Harvard, MIT, and Stanford.

== Science Museum ==
The Bahçeşehir Science Museum, located on the Bahçeşehir, Başakşehir campus, was established with the goal of encouraging children, particularly those in the 12 to 15 age group, as well as adults of all ages, to engage with science. Most of the exhibits were designed and constructed by students of the Bahçeşehir High School for Science and Technology. It was the first science museum of its kind to be established by a school on its own campus. Following its success, a second museum was opened at BJK College in Istanbul, and a third was launched in the Karşıyaka district of İzmir.

Following the opening of the series of science museums targeted at the preschool-teen age group, Turkey's first Children's Science Museum, designed to engage younger primary school children with science, was opened at the Bahçeşehir Primary School campus in April 2010, coinciding with the National Children's Day official holiday.

== See also ==
- Bahçeşehir University
