= Halkalı-Bahçeşehir Rail System =

Bahçeşehir- Halkalı suburban railway (B2)

Halkalı – Bahçeşehir Railway System B2 (Halkalı – Bahçeşehir) Suburban Rail

Overview
- Status: Out of Service (Halkalı, Ispartakule, Bahçeşehir); Under construction (Konut Birlik & Altınşehir)
- Owner: Turkish State Railways
- Termini: Halkalı railway station; Bahçeşehir
- Stations: 5 (Operational: 2, Out of Service: 1, Under construction: 2)

Service
- Operator: TCDD Transportation
- Rolling stock: TCDD E32000

History
- Opened: 23 May 2022 (Halkalı, Bahçeşehir)

Technical
- Line length: 1.35 km (0.84 mi)
- Electrification: 25kV AC overhead line

The B2 (Halkalı-Bahçeşehir) suburban or Halkalı-Bahçeşehir Rail System is a suburban train line that operates between Halkalı station and Bahçeşehir station in Istanbul.

Following the demands for the extension of Marmaray's westward terminal station, Halkalı, to Ispartakule and Çatalca, in 2019, the Başakşehir Municipality announced that it would open a temporary train line to connect the residents of the region to Halkalı. Due to the single track between Halkalı and Bahçeşehir and the absence of a signaling system, the system can only operate with a transfer to the Marmaray line twice a day in each direction.

While the construction of Bahçeşehir station was undertaken by the Municipality of Başakşehir, the construction of Ispartakule, Altınşehir, and Konut Birlik stations are being constructed by the Turkish State Railways.

On September 18, 2021, with the completion of the construction of the terminal station in Bahçeşehir, Mayor Yasin Kartoğlu of Başakşehir announced the successful completion of the first trial run of the line.

The line originally only operated between the Halkalı and Bahçeşehir stations, and later the Ispartakule station, with its opening on January 29, 2024. The Konut Birlik station is in the final stages of its construction, while the Altınşehir station is still in its initial phase. In the future, it is anticipated that the necessary installations for these stations will be completed, making them ready for operation.

On June 19, 2026, TCDD announced that the suburban rail has been taken Out of Service indefinitely due to construction works at the Halkalı-Kapıkule high-speed railway. The train remains Out of Service with no clear date for reopening

== Stations ==
Order	Station	District	Transfer(s)	Type	Notes
↓↓ Out of Service ↓↓
1	Halkalı	Küçükçekmece	(Halkalı)・ (Halkalı) İETT Bus: 79Y, 89A, 89BS, 98S, 143, BN1, H-3, MK16, MR40, MR42, MR50, MR51, MR52, MR54	At-grade	TCDD Residences・Halkalı Customs Directorate・Halkalı Marmaray IETT Platforms
↓↓ Under construction↓↓
2	Konut Birlik	Küçükçekmece	İETT Bus: 36AS, 76V, 79G, 79Ş ,79Y, 89A, 89K, 98S, 141M, HT1, HT20, KÇ2, MK16, MK31, MR51	At-grade	
3	Altınşehir	Küçükçekmece	İETT Bus: 79G, 79Ş, HT20	At-grade	
↑↑ Under construction ↑↑
4	Ispartakule	Başakşehir	(Ispartakule) İETT Bus: 76A, 76V, 142B, 142E, 142T, 144M, 146T, 147, E-57, E-58, E-59, HS2, MK14, MK15	At-grade	Bahçeşehir Pond
5	Bahçeşehir		İETT Bus: 142, 142A, 144K, 146, 146T, E-59, MK15,		Pazartürk Fair and Exhibition Area
↑↑ Out of Service ↑↑

== Station distances ==
Measurements have been taken based on the middle section of the platforms of the stations

Order	Station	Distances between stations	Distance from the initial station	Distance from Sirkeci
1	Halkalı	0+00 km	Departure	27+63 km
2	Konut Birlik	2+14 km	2+14 km	29+77 km
3	Altınşehir	2+66 km	4+80 km	32+43 km
4	Ispartakule	5+59 km	10+39 km	38+02 km
5	Bahçeşehir	2+96 km	13+35 km	40+98 km
