= Şamlar =

- Neighbourhood
- Location in Turkey Şamlar (Istanbul)
- Coordinates: 41°07′30″N 28°44′55″E
- Country: Turkey
- Province: Istanbul
- District: Başakşehir
- Elevation: 50 m (160 ft)
- Population (2022): 1,267
- Time zone: UTC+3 (TRT)
- Postal code: 34306
- Area code: 0212

Şamlar is a neighbourhood in the municipality and district of Başakşehir, Istanbul Province, Turkey. Its population is 1,267 (2022). It is situated in the European portion of Turkey, so called Rumeli, to the east of the Sazlıdere Dam reservoir. It is about 15 kilometres (9.3 mi) northwest of Başakşehir.

The oldest building in the village is a mosque dated 1839. A part of village territory was confiscated during the construction of Sazlıdere Dam. For that part, the government started a new housing project which is now called Yenişamlar ("new Şamlar"). The main economic activities of the village are agriculture, cattle breeding, fishing and some light industries.
