= Bahçeşehir University =

Private university in İstanbul, Turkey

Coordinates: 41°02′30″N 29°00′34″E

Bahcesehir University
- Bahçeşehir Üniversitesi
- Motto: İstanbul'un Kalbinde Bir Dünya Üniversitesi
- Motto in English: A World University in the Heart of Istanbul
- Type: Private
- Established: 1998; 28 years ago
- Founder: Enver Yücel
- Affiliations: Bahçeşehir Uğur Educational Institutions, BAU Global Network, Acadex, International Student Partnership Association (ISPA)
- Rector: Esra Hatipoğlu
- Students: 17,048
- Undergraduates: 18,448
- Postgraduates: 5,567 (Including doctoral students.)
- Location: Istanbul, Turkey
- Campus: Urban (Main campus in Çırağan Caddesi, Beşiktaş. Other campuses in Galata, Göztepe, Şişli, Berlin, Cologne, Hong Kong, Rome, Boston, Washington, D.C., Silicon Valley, Toronto and Batumi.)
- Language: English, Turkish
- Colors: Blue White

Bahçeşehir University or commonly abbreviated as BAU is a private university located around the Bosphorus in Çırağan Caddesi, Beşiktaş, Istanbul. The Grand National Assembly of Turkey authorized the establishment of Bahçeşehir University by the Bahçeşehir Uğur Education Foundation in 1998. In February 1998, an academic and strategic collaboration was signed with San Diego State University in California. The university's first cohort of students enrolled following the first university placement exam in the 1999–2000 academic year. The current rector is Prof. Dr. Şirin Karadeniz.

Bahçeşehir University is a member of BAU Global, the international education network of Bahçeşehir Uğur Educational Institutions (Turkish: Bahçeşehir Uğur Eğitim Kurumları). BAU Global includes nine universities, four language schools, and two K-12 schools, Bahçeşehir College and Uğur Schools (Turkish: Uğur Okulları). Bahçeşehir University has established a long-term collaboration with Harvard University, focusing on various academic and research initiatives.

Bahçeşehir University consists of 8 faculties, 1 school of languages, and 2 vocational schools. Four institutes offer post-graduate education. The university has a total of 17,048 registered students, including 10,137 undergraduate students, 4,716 graduate students, and 1,072 associate degree students. The academic staff includes 1,047 faculty members, and 506 administrative personnel are employed by the university. The university operates across 4 campuses in Istanbul. The Bahçeşehir University Library, covering an area of 1,400 square meters, offers a collection of 250,000 publications, including books and e-books. Additionally, the campus hosts five cafés and restaurants, and the conference hall has a total audience capacity of 1,000.

Bahçeşehir University was awarded the "Superbrands of Turkey" title in 2007.

== Rankings and international recognition ==
University rankings

Regional – Overall
- QS Emerging Europe and Central Asia: 221-230 (2022)

Bahçeşehir University is regarded as one of the top privately owned universities in Turkey and is consistently ranked among the top 10 universities in the country. The university operates seven campuses outside of Turkey: two in the United States, located in Washington D.C. and Boston, also in Toronto, Rome, Berlin, Batumi, and Hong Kong. Additionally, the university has over 193 international partners. In Istanbul, Bahçeşehir University has six campuses.

== Academic units ==
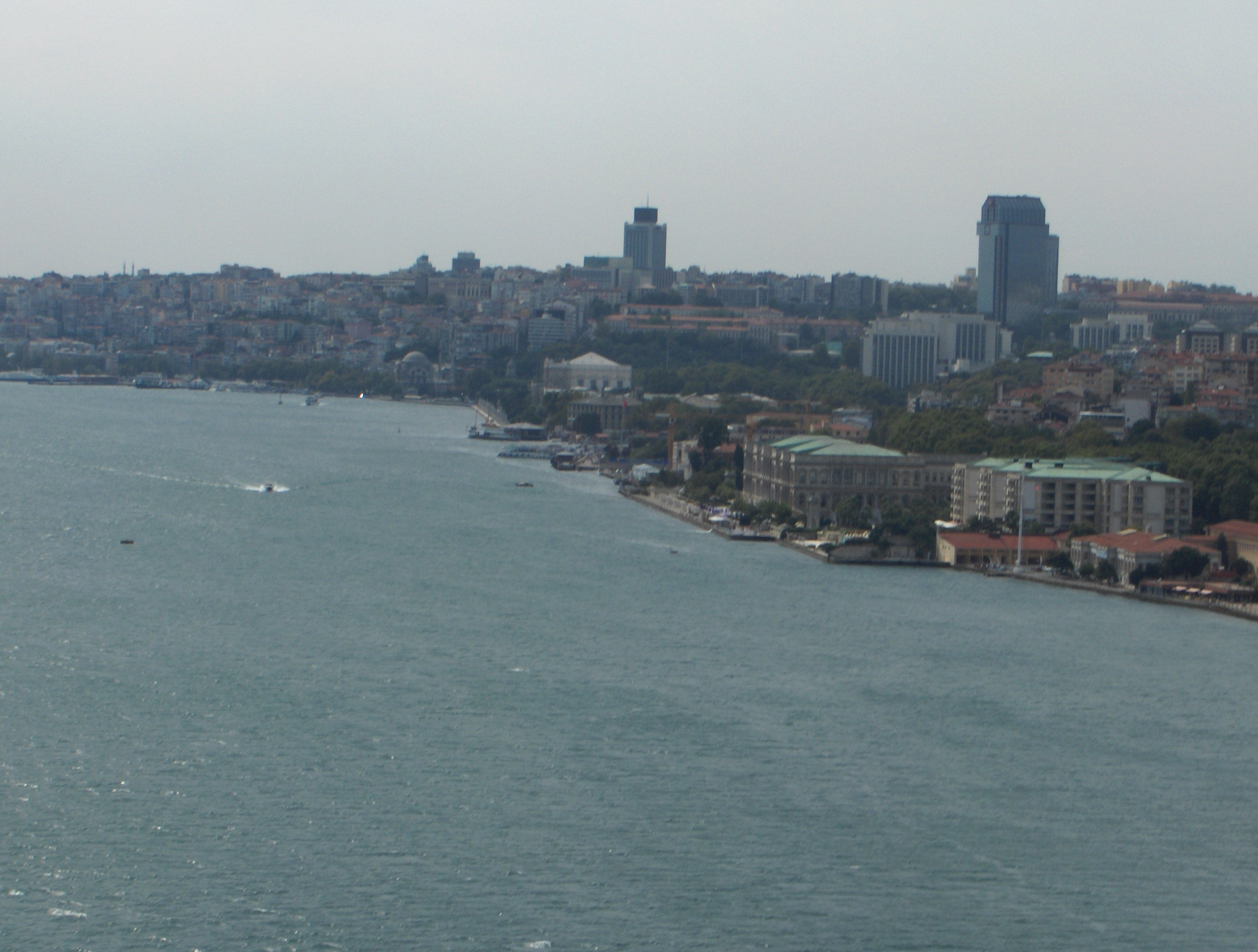
View of Bahçeşehir University from the Bosphorus.

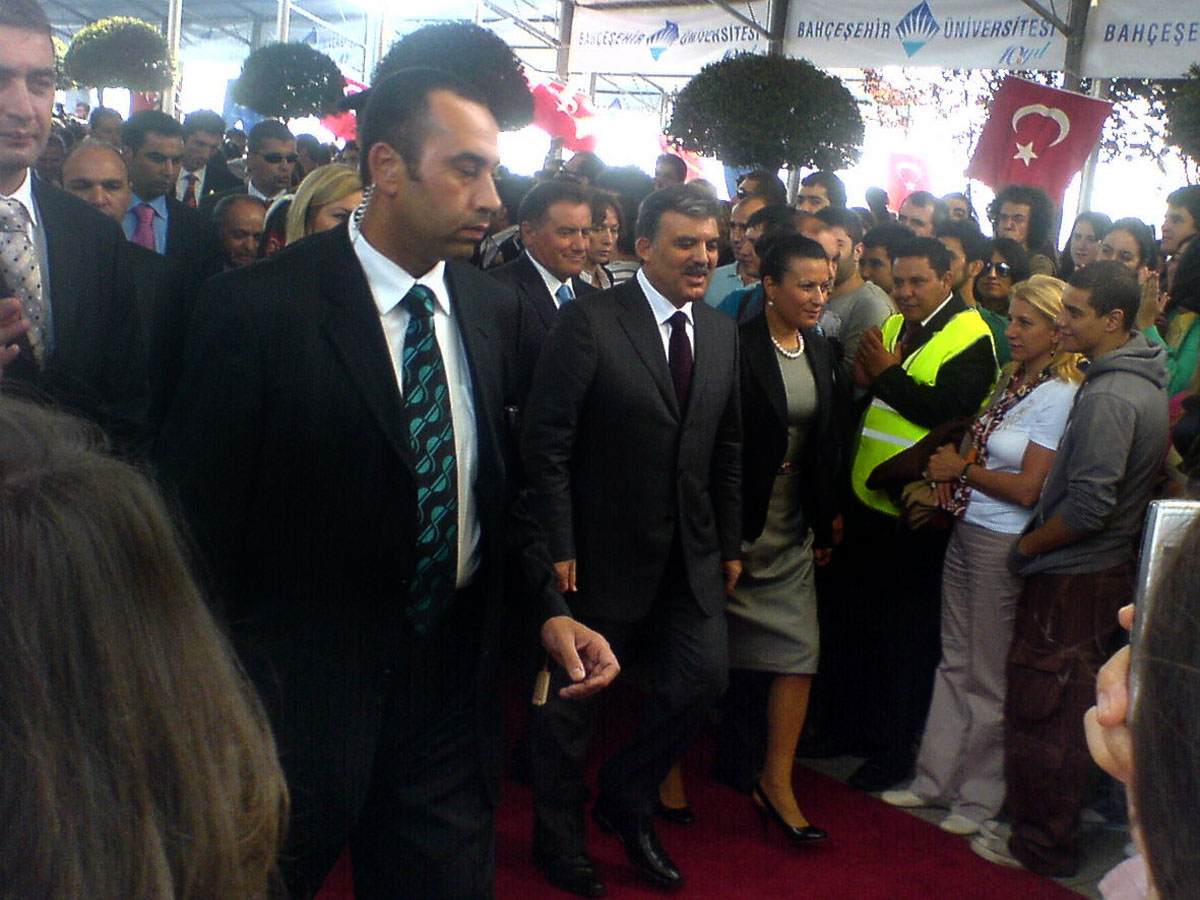
Abdullah Gül, the President of Turkey, attended the 10th Academic Year Inauguration of Bahçeşehir University.

=== Faculties and Departments ===
- Faculty of Law
- Faculty of Medicine
- Faculty of Economics, Administrative and Social Sciences: American Culture and Literature, European Union Relations, Economics, Economics and Finance, Business Administration, Logistic Management, Political Science and International Relations, International Finance, International Trade, Sociology, and Psychology
- Faculty of Communication: Digital Game Design, Photography and Video, Communication Design, Public Relations, Advertising, Cinema and Television, and New Media
- Faculty of Architecture and Design: Architecture, Interior Architecture and Environmental Design, and Industrial Product Design
- Faculty of Engineering and Natural Sciences: Computer Engineering, Biomedical Engineering, Industrial Engineering, Electrical and Electronic Engineering, Energy Systems Engineering, Civil Engineering, Molecular Biology and Genetics, Management Engineering, Mechatronics Engineering, Mathematical Engineering, Artificial Intelligence Engineering, and Software Engineering
- Faculty of Health Sciences: Audiology, Physiotherapy and Rehabilitation, Occupational Therapy, Nursing, Nutrition and Dietetics, and Management of Health Institutes
- Vocational School: Computer Programming, Foreign Trade, Mechatronics, Maritime Transportation and Management, and Private Security and Protection
- English Preparatory School

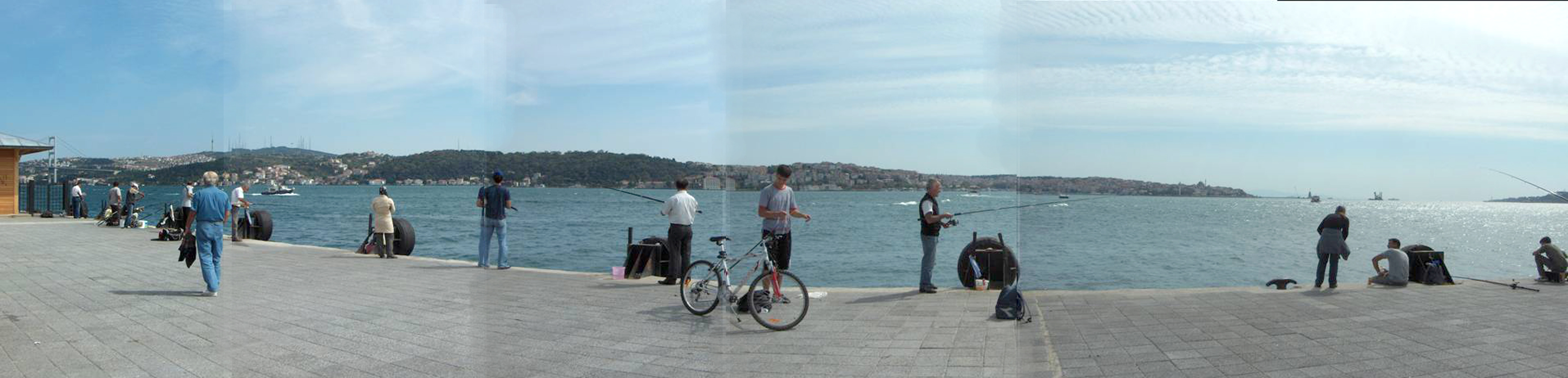
Bahçeşehir University, a view towards the Bosphorus.

=== Graduate Schools ===
- Graduate School of Natural and Applied Sciences: Actuarial Science, Applied Mathematics, Architecture, Bioengineering, Computer Engineering, Cyber Security, Electrical and Electronic Engineering, Energy and Environment Management, Energy Systems Operation and Technologies, Engineering Management, Industrial Engineering, Information Technologies, Interior Design, Mechatronics Engineering, Sound Technologies, Supply Chain and Logistics Management, and Urban Systems and Transportation Management. Ph.D. in Computer Engineering, Electrical and Electronic Engineering, Industrial Engineering, Mathematics, and History, Theory and Criticism in Design
- Graduate School of Social Sciences: MBA, Financial Economics, Entrepreneurship and Innovation Management, Global Affairs, Advanced Acting, Human Resources Management, Public Law, Clinical Psychology, Global Business and Marketing, Global Politics and International Relations, Accounting and International Reporting, Game Design, Private Law, Marketing Communications and Public Relations, Marketing, Advertising and Brand Communication Management, Capital Markets and Finance, Capital Markets and Commercial Law, Film and Television, Sports Management, Strategic Marketing and Brand Management, History, Distance Education in Global Politics and International Relations, and Management Information Systems. Ph.D. in Economics and Finance, Business Administration, Public Law, Private Law, Advertising and Public Relations, Cinema and Media Research, Political Science and International Relations, and Interior Design

== Bahçeşehir University's CO-OP Program ==
CO-OP, which stands for Cooperative Education Program, is an educational model that integrates university and business life. The purpose of CO-OP is to bridge the gap between education and the workforce by allowing students to continue their studies while gaining practical work experience. The program includes 1,500 local partners and 150 international partners.

== See also ==
- List of universities in Turkey
- Bahçeşehir College
- YÖK
