= Sazlıdere Dam =

- Location within Turkey
- Official name: Sazlıdere Barajı
- Location: Başakşehir, Istanbul Province, Turkey
- Coordinates: 41°06′21″N 28°43′06″E
- Construction began: 1992
- Opening date: 1996; 30 years ago

Dam and spillways
- Type of dam: Arch dam
- Impounds: Sazlıdere
- Height: 23 m (75 ft)

Reservoir
- Total capacity: 91.3 hm³
- Surface area: 10 km²
- Website www2.dsi.gov.tr/bolge/dsi14/isletme.htm#sazlidere

Sazlıdere Dam is a reservoir dam in the Başakşehir district of Istanbul Province, Turkey. The dam supplies the European side of Istanbul and its suburbs with drinking water. The Turkish State Hydraulic Works backed the development of the dam, which was constructed between 1992 and 1996. The reservoir supplies 50 hm³ of drinking water annually.

== See also ==
- List of dams and reservoirs in Turkey
