= Kumkapı railway station =

Railway station in Fatih, Istanbul, Turkey

KUMKAPI

General information
- Coordinates: 41.0033°N 28.9632°E
- Owner: TCDD
- Line: Istanbul-Pythion railway
- Platforms: 1
- Tracks: 2
- Connections: İETT Bus: BN1

Construction
- Structure type: At-grade
- Parking: No
- Cycle facilities: Yes
- Accessible: Yes

History
- Opened: 27 July 1872; 154 years ago
- Closed: 2013–2024
- Rebuilt: 4 December 1955; 70 years ago 26 February 2024; 2 years ago
- Electrified: 4 December 1955 (25 kV AC)

Services
Preceding station	TCDD Taşımacılık	Following station
Yenikapı towards Kazlıçeşme	T6	Cankurtaran towards Sirkeci
Former services
Preceding station	Turkish State Railways	Following station
Yenikapı towards Halkalı	Istanbul suburban	Cankurtaran towards Sirkeci
Location

Kumkapı is a railway station on the İstanbul-Halkalı Line in Istanbul. The station is located in southeastern Fatih along Kennedy Boulevard and is 3.8 km (2.4 mi) away from Sirkeci Terminal. The station was built in 1872 by the Rumelia Railway as part of the extension of their mainline into İstanbul's city center. The station was rebuilt and electrified in 1955 for the start of commuter service between Sirkeci and Halkalı. Kumkapı was indefinitely closed in 2013 due to the rehabilitation and construction of the new Marmaray line. The station was rebuilt and reopened on 26 February 2024 as part of the T6 Sirkeci–Kazlıçeşme Tramway Line / U3 Sirkeci–Kazlıçeşme Rail Line.
