= Kocamustafapaşa railway station =

Railway station in İstanbul, Turkey

Kocamustafapaşa

General information
- Location: İçkalpakçı Sk, Kocamustafapaşa Mh, İstanbul, Turkey
- Coordinates: 40°59′59″N 28°55′59″E
- Owner: TCDD
- Line: Istanbul-Pythion railway
- Platforms: 1
- Tracks: 2
- Connections: İETT Bus: 35, 35A, 35C, 35D, 80, 80T, BN1

Construction
- Structure type: At-grade
- Parking: No

History
- Opened: 4 December 1955; 70 years ago
- Closed: 2013–2024
- Rebuilt: 26 February 2024; 2 years ago
- Electrified: 4 December 1955 (25 kV AC)
- Former names: Samatya railway station

Services
Preceding station	TCDD Taşımacılık	Following station
Yedikule towards Kazlıçeşme	T6	Cerrahpaşa towards Sirkeci
Former services
Preceding station	Turkish State Railways	Following station
Yedikule towards Halkalı	Istanbul suburban	Yenikapı towards Sirkeci
Location

Kocamustafapaşa station is a railway station on the Sirkeci-Kazlıçeşme Line. The station is located in the Samatya neighborhood of Istanbul's Fatih district. Kocamustafapaşa was closed in 2013 due to the closure of the whole B1 line, after the opening of the new Marmaray line. The station was renovated and reopened as part of the T6 line that was inaugurated in February 2024.

== Pictures ==
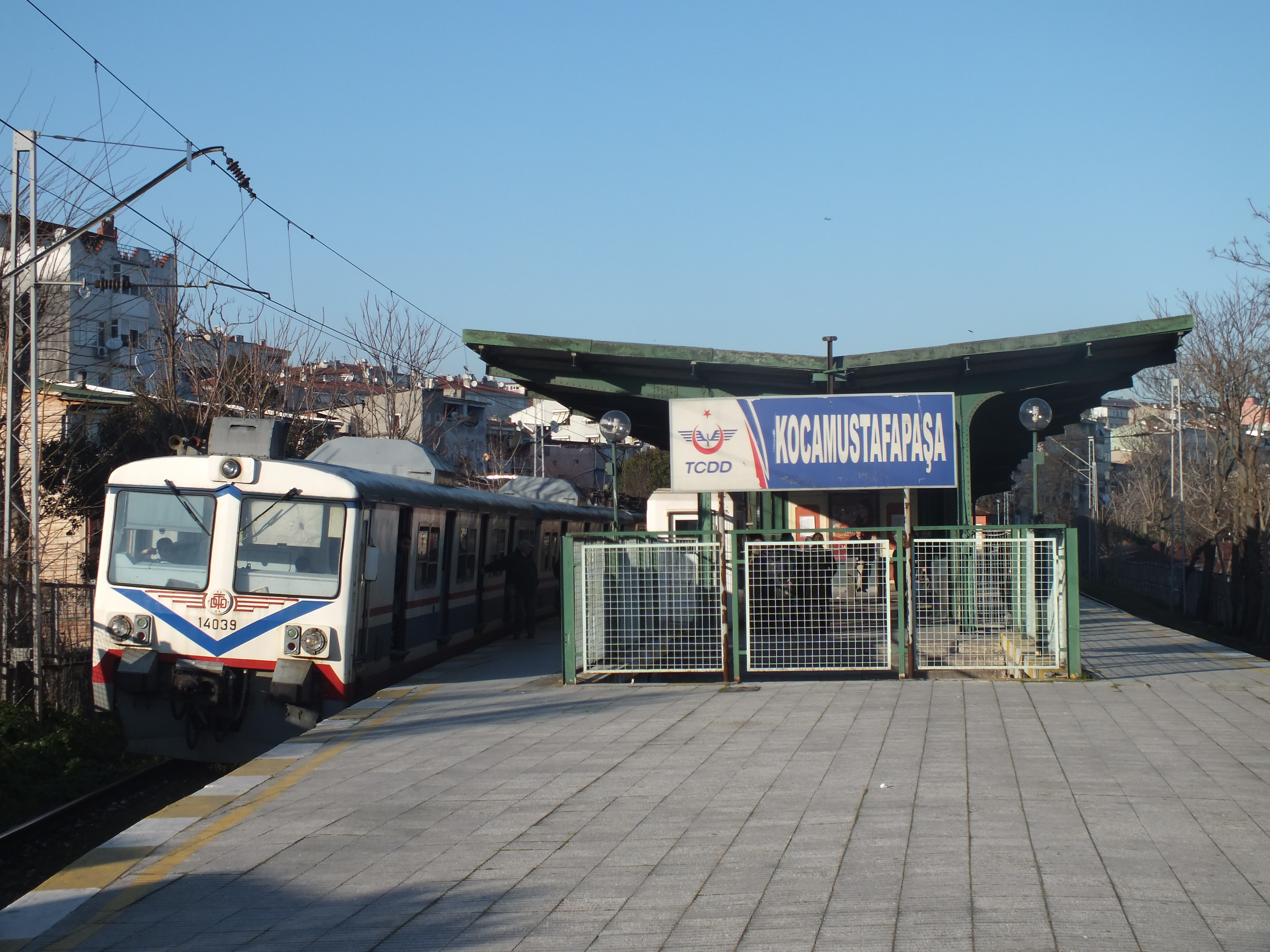
Kocamustafapaşa station before its closure in 2013.
