= Yenikapı railway station =

Railway station in Istanbul

YENİKAPI

General information
- Location: Gazi Mustafa Kemal Paşa Boulevard, 34096, Aksaray, Fatih, Istanbul; Turkey
- Coordinates: 41°00′17″N 28°57′09″E
- Owner: Turkish State Railways
- Line: Istanbul-Pythion railway
- Platforms: 1 island platform
- Tracks: 2

Construction
- Structure type: At-grade
- Parking: No
- Cycle facilities: Yes
- Accessible: Yes

History
- Opened: 27 July 1872; 154 years ago
- Closed: 2013–2024
- Rebuilt: 4 December 1955; 70 years ago 26 February 2024; 2 years ago
- Electrified: 4 December 1955 (25 kV AC)

Services
Preceding station	TCDD Taşımacılık	Following station
Cerrahpaşa towards Kazlıçeşme	T6	Kumkapı towards Sirkeci
Former services
Preceding station	Turkish State Railways	Following station
Kocamustafapaşa towards Halkalı	Istanbul suburban	Kumkapı towards Sirkeci
Location

Yenikapı is a railway station on the T6 Sirkeci–Kazlıçeşme Tramway Line / U3 Sirkeci–Kazlıçeşme Rail Line in the Yenikapı neighborhood of Istanbul, Turkey. The station is situated near the south end of the busy Gazi Mustafa Kemal Paşa Boulevard and one block north of Kennedy Caddesi, two major inner-city roadways and is 4.8 km (3.0 mi) west of Sirkeci Terminal. Connection is available to the Marmaray line and Lines M1 and M2 of the Istanbul Metro.

== History ==
The station was built in 1872 by the Oriental Railway, which was then taken over by the Turkish State Railways (TCDD) in 1937 and electrified in 1955. From 1955 to 2013, it formed part of the Istanbul suburban commuter rail line (B1) between Sirkeci and Halkalı on the European side of Istanbul. Due to the rehabilitation of the line between Halkalı and Kazlıçeşme for the Marmaray commuter service, Yenikapı was indefinitely closed on 19 March 2013. On 29 October 2013, the new underground Yenikapı railway station, which makes up a part of the new Yenikapı Transfer Center, was opened along with the trans-Bosphorus Marmaray tunnel. The new Yenikapı complex is located right next to the existing railway station and is serviced by 3 lines of the Istanbul Metro. The station was rebuilt and reopened on 26 February 2024 as part of the T6 Sirkeci–Kazlıçeşme Tramway Line / U3 Sirkeci–Kazlıçeşme Rail Line.

== Pictures ==
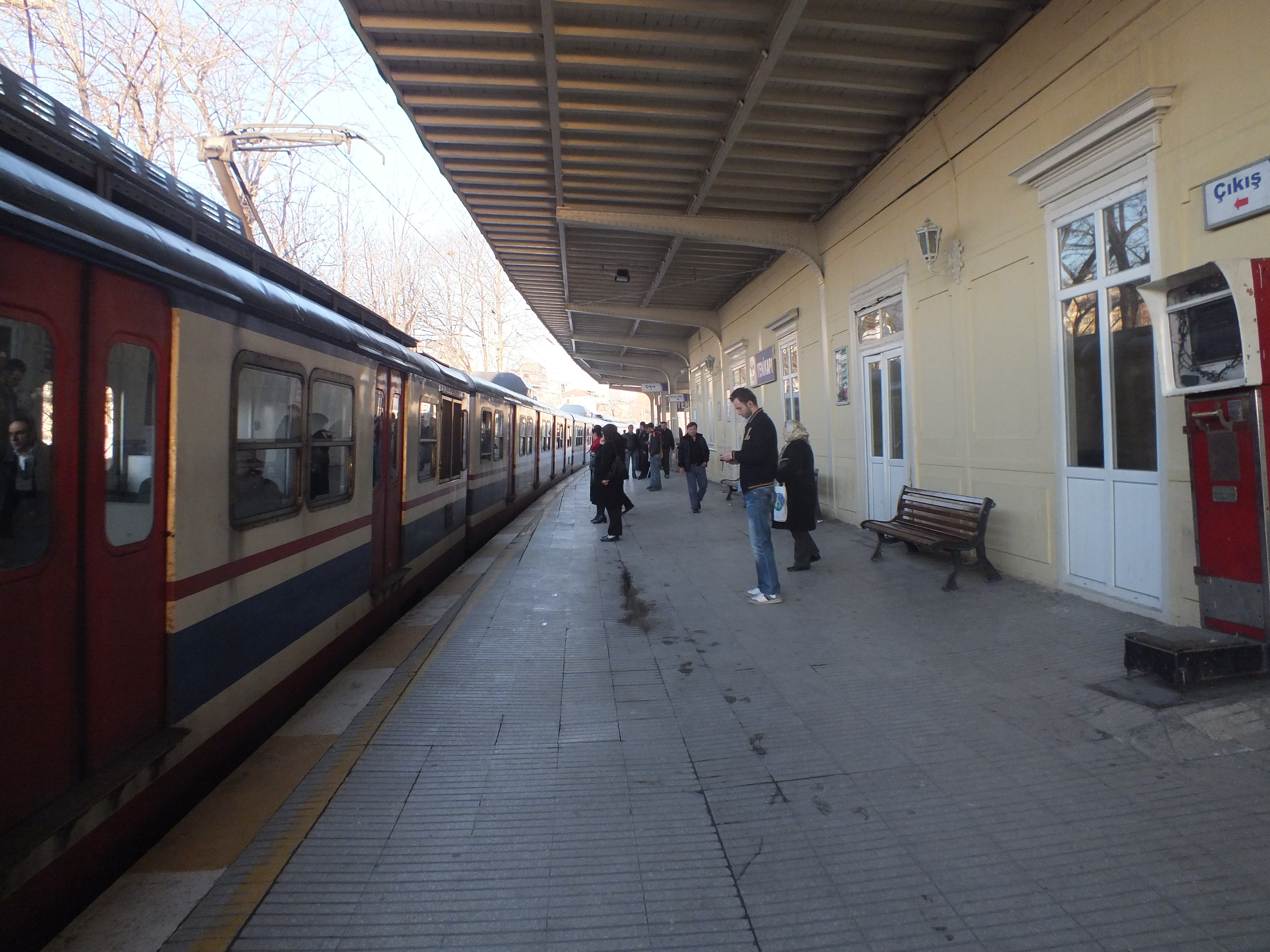
A Halkalı bound train at the station in 2012.
