= Yedikule railway station =

YEDİKULE
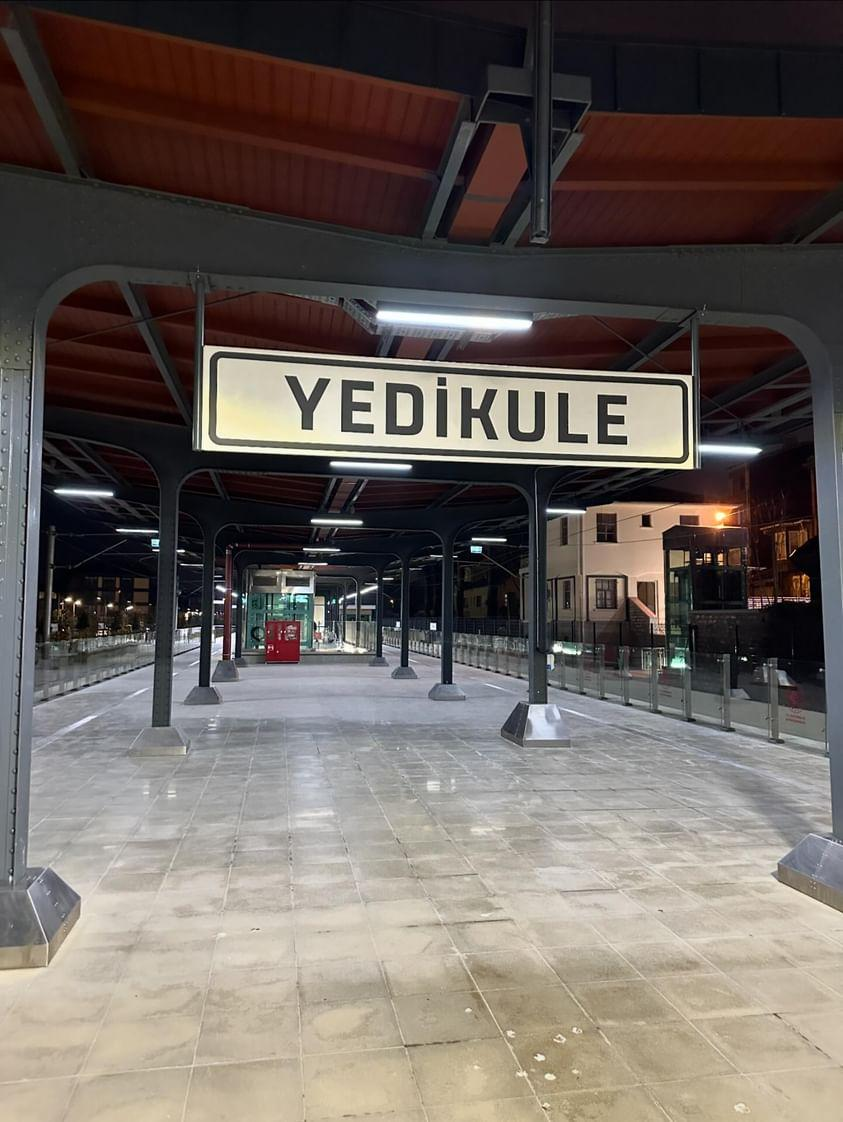

General information
- Location: Yedikule İstasyonu Cd. 32a, Yedikule Mah. 34107; Fatih/Istanbul; Turkey
- Coordinates: 40.9938°N 28.9269°E
- Owner: Turkish State Railways
- Line: Istanbul-Pythion railway
- Platforms: 1 island platform
- Tracks: 2
- Connections: İETT Bus: 80, 80T, BN1

Construction
- Structure type: At-grade
- Parking: No
- Cycle facilities: Yes
- Accessible: Yes

History
- Opened: 4 January 1871; 155 years ago
- Closed: 2013–2024
- Rebuilt: 4 December 1955; 70 years ago 26 February 2024; 2 years ago
- Electrified: 4 December 1955 (25 kV AC)

Services
Preceding station	TCDD Taşımacılık	Following station
Kazlıçeşme Terminus	T6	Kocamustafapaşa towards Sirkeci
Former services
Preceding station	Turkish State Railways	Following station
Kazlıçeşme towards Halkalı	Istanbul suburban	Kocamustafapaşa towards Sirkeci
Location

Yedikule station is a formerly indefinitely closed railway station on the Istanbul suburban. It is located in the Yedikule neighborhood in southwest Fatih. The Yedikule Electric Train Depot is located right next to the station but was closed down in the early 2000s. The station had one track servicing an island platform (eastbound track) during the construction of the Marmaray tunnels, the westbound track being temporarily removed. Yedikule was served by the İstanbul-Halkalı Line, which was abandoned with the opening of Marmaray. The station is 7.46 km (4.64 mi) away from Sirkeci Terminal. The station was rebuilt and reopened on 26 February 2024 as part of the T6 Sirkeci–Kazlıçeşme Tramway Line / U3 Sirkeci–Kazlıçeşme Rail Line.

== Pictures ==
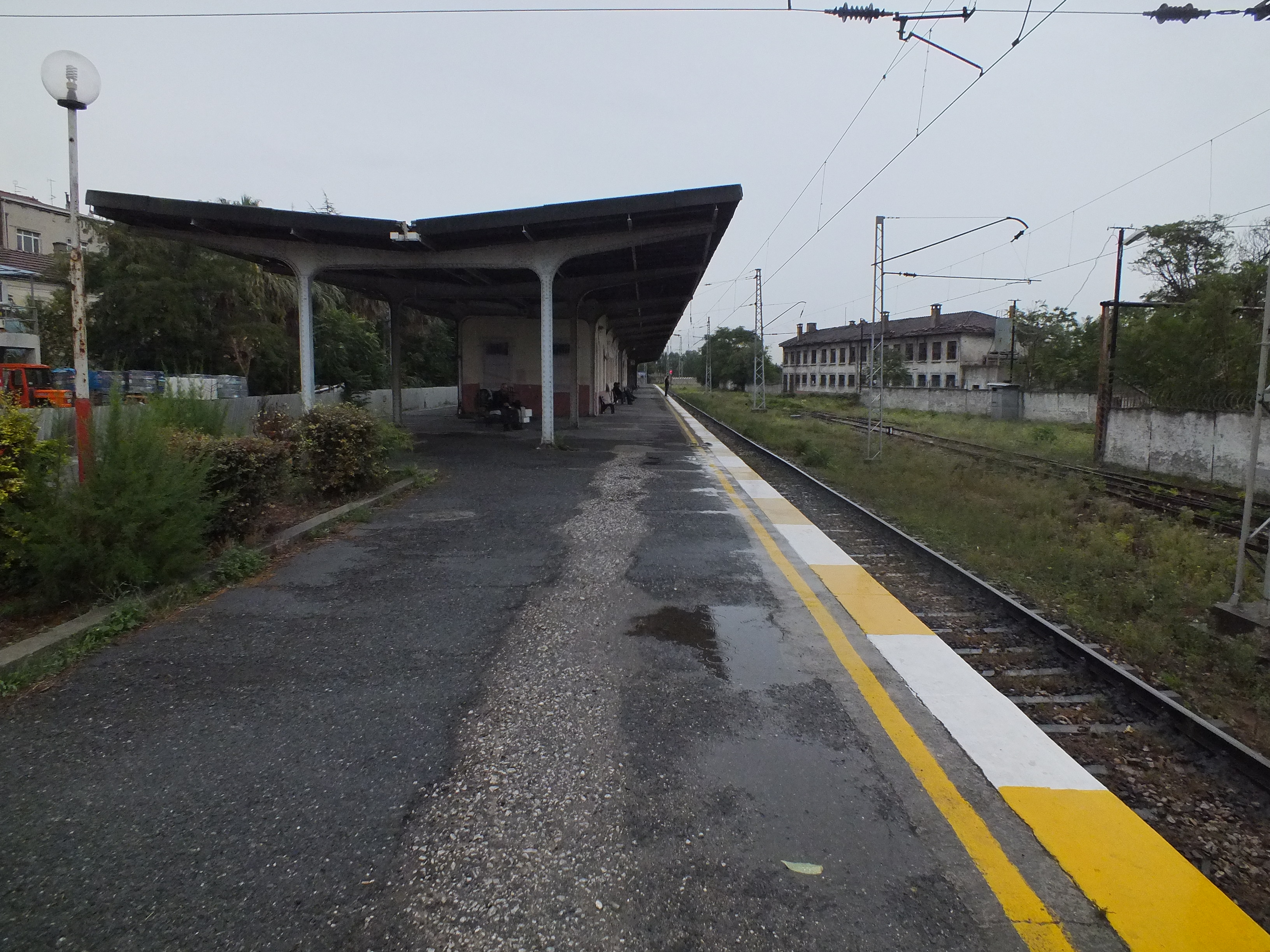
Yedikule station before its closure in 2013.
