= Cerrahpaşa railway station =

Railway station in Istanbul, Turkey

Cerrahpaşa
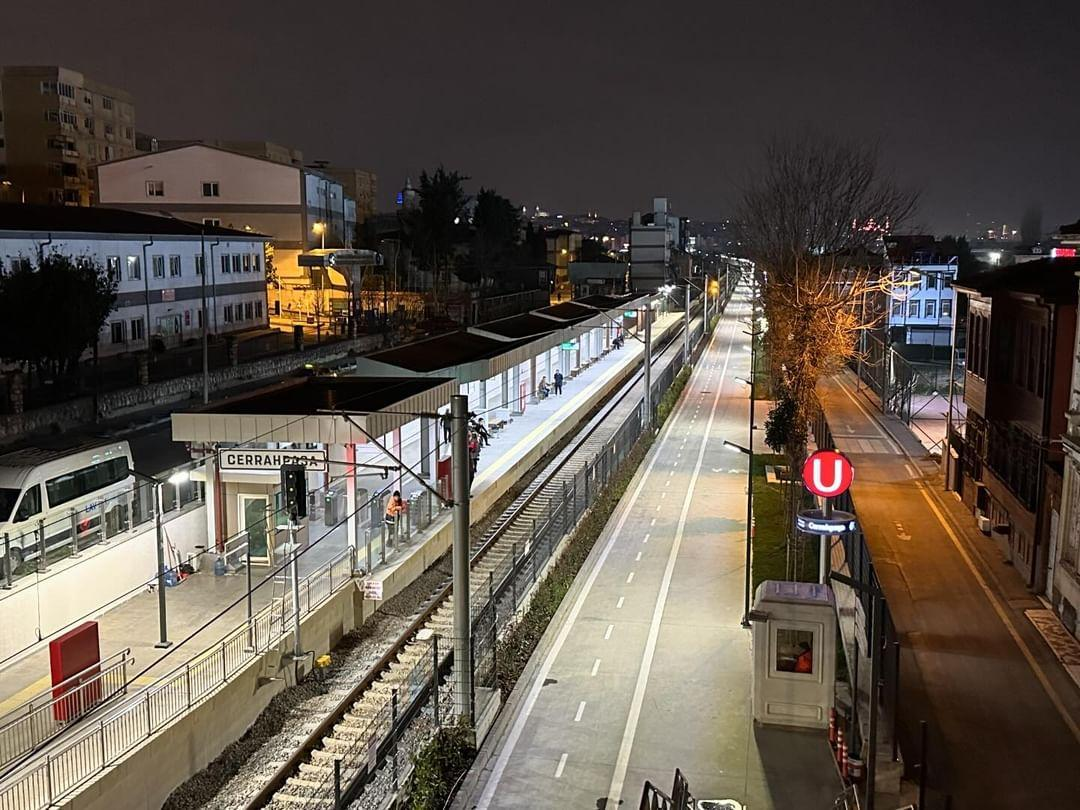
- The pedestrian path adjacent to the station is where the former westbound track used to be.

General information
- Location: Org. Abdurrahman Nafiz Gürman Cd., Cerrahpaşa Mah. 34098, Fatih, Istanbul
- Coordinates: 41.002804°N 28.940338°E,
- Owner: Turkish State Railways
- Operator: TCDD Taşımacılık
- Line: Istanbul-Pythion railway
- Platforms: 1 side platform
- Tracks: 1
- Connections: İETT Bus: 80, 80T

Construction
- Structure type: At-grade
- Parking: No
- Accessible: Yes

History
- Opened: 26 February 2024; 2 years ago
- Electrified: 25 kV AC

Services
| Preceding station | TCDD Taşımacılık | Following station |
|---|---|---|
| Kocamustafapaşa towards Kazlıçeşme | T6 | Yenikapı towards Sirkeci |
Location

Cerrahpaşa railway station (Turkish: Cerrapaşa istasyonu) is a railway station on the Istanbul-Pythion railway in Istanbul, Turkey. Opened together with the T6 shuttle line from Kazlıçeşme to Sirkeci on 26 February 2024, Cerrapaşa is the most recently opened railway station in Istanbul. Built on the originally double-track right-of-way, the station has one side platform with one track. The pedestrian path just south of the track was the former right-of-way of the second track, which closed down in 2013.
