= Kanarya railway station =

Kanarya

General information
- Location: İstasyon Cd. 25, Kanarya Mah. 34290; Küçükçekmece/Istanbul; Turkey
- Coordinates: 41.0097°N 28.7741°E
- Owner: Turkish State Railways
- Line: Istanbul suburban
- Platforms: 1 island platform
- Tracks: 2

Construction
- Parking: No

History
- Opened: 4 December 1955
- Closed: 1 March 2013
- Electrified: 4 December 1955; 25 kV AC, 60 Hz overhead wire

Former service
Preceding station	Turkish State Railways	Following station
Former service
Halkalı Terminus	Istanbul suburban	Soğuksu towards Sirkeci
Location

Kanarya station (Turkish: Kanarya istasyonu) was a station on the Istanbul suburban in Küçükçekmece, Istanbul. Located along the eastern shore of Lake Küçükçekmece, it was the second westernmost stop on the line, before Halkalı. The station consisted of an island platform serving two tracks. Kanarya station was opened on 4 December 1955 by the Turkish State Railways as part of the electric commuter rail service from Sirkeci to Halkalı. The station saw its last train of 1 March 2013 and was demolished shortly after. The new Marmaray commuter rail system did not rebuild the station to modern standards, closing down Kanarya after over 57 years of service.
