= Yedi Kule =

Yedi Kule or Yedikule ("Seven Towers" in Turkish) can refer to:

- Yedikule Fortress in Istanbul, Turkey.
- Yedikule neighborhood, where the fortress is located, in the district of Fatih in Istanbul, Turkey.
- Heptapyrgion citadel in Thessaloniki, Greece.
- Theodoros Vardinogiannis Stadium in Heraklion, Crete, is popularly nicknamed "Yedi Kule".
