= Battle of Rusçuk (1773) =

- Part of the Russo-Turkish War (1768–1774)
| Date | 15 May 1773 |
| Location | Ruse, Ottoman Empire |
| Result | Ottoman victory |

Belligerents
| Ottoman Empire | Russian Empire |

Commanders and leaders
| (Ottoman Empire) Ali Pasha | N. P. Repnin (WIA) |

Casualties and losses
| Light | 3,500 |

Battle of Rusçuk, was one of the battles of the Russo-Turkish War (1768–1774). The Russian army under the command of Colonel N. P. Repnin was defeated by the Ottoman army under the command of Ali Pasha near Ruse on May 15, 1773.

== Battle ==
The battle took place near the walls of Ruse. The Russian army under the command of Colonel N. P. Repnin (brother of General Nikolay Vasilyevich Repnin) thought that they could easily capture this place, relying on their serial successes until 1771. However, Ali Pasha came to the aid of Rusçuk and attacked the Russian army.

The shaken Russian army, including its commander Colonel Repnin, retreated with 1,000 to 3,000 prisoners and 500 dead, while also losing 3 cannons. After Colonel Repnin's wound was treated, he was sent to Istanbul and imprisoned in Yedikule Fortress.

== Aftermath ==
After this defeat, Field Marshal Pyotr Rumyantsev concentrated on the offensives in Varna, Bulgaria and Silistra, but the Ottoman army won notable victories there as well.
