= T6 (Istanbul Tram) =

Transit line in the largest city of Turkey

U3 Sirkeci–Kazlıçeşme Suburban Rail System Line T6 (Sirkeci – Kazlıçeşme) Tram Line
- The starting station of the line, Sirkeci

Overview
- Status: Opened
- Owner: Turkish State Railways
- Line number: U3 (UAB); T6 (IBB)
- Locale: Istanbul, Turkey
- Termini: Sirkeci; Kazlıçeşme
- Stations: 8

Service
- Type: Commuter rail
- System: Istanbul Metro
- Services: 1
- Operator: TCDD Taşımacılık
- Rolling stock: TCDD E32000

History
- Opened: 26 February 2024

Technical
- Line length: 8.394 km (5.216 mi)
- Number of tracks: 1
- Track gauge: 1,435 mm (4 ft 8 1/2 in) standard gauge

The U3 Sirkeci–Kazlıçeşme Rail System (Turkish: Sirkeci – Kazlıçeşme Raylı Sistemi) or T6 Sirkeci–Kazlıçeşme Tramway Line (Turkish: Sirkeci – Kazlıçeşme Tramvay Hattı) is a commuter rail line that operates between the Sirkeci Terminal and Kazlıçeşme Station.

The T6 line uses approximately 8.3 kilometres (5.2 mi) of track previously used by the Istanbul Sirkeci-Pythio railway and Istanbul suburban closed since 12 August 2013 as part of construction of the Marmaray, running on refurbished tracks through Sirkeci and Kazlıçeşme. The line currently uses repainted TCDD E32000 units used on the Marmaray line, but is expected to have modernized nostalgic tram vehicles, although when these nostalgic tram vehicles will be put into operation remains unclear. Despite the tram designation, its trains and infrastructure is not of tram, but rather closer to commuter rail with metro-like elements.

With the completion of this project, it is once again possible for regional and international trains to depart from Sirkeci as before, and for trains carrying dangerous goods that could not use the Marmaray Tunnel to be transported from Sirkeci to Haydarpaşa by train ferry.

The line is defined as a rail line by the Ministry of Transport and Infrastructure, but defined as a light rail or tram system by the Istanbul Metropolitan Municipality (IBB).

== Stations ==
No	Station	Type	Transfer	District	Notes
1	Sirkeci	At-Grade	・・ İETT Bus: BN1	Fatih	Sirkeci Station・Sirkeci Railway Museum・Gülhane Park・Istanbul Governorate・Eminönü
2	Cankurtaran	At-Grade	İETT Bus: BN1	Fatih	Cankurtaran Social Facility
3	Kumkapı	At-Grade	İETT Bus: BN1	Fatih	
4	Yenikapı	Viaduct	・・・ İETT Bus: 30D, 31, 31Y, 50Y, 70FY, 70KY, 71AT, 72YT, 76A, 77, 88A, 146T, 366Y	Fatih	Yenikapı Square・Dr. Kadir Topbaş Exhibition & Art Center・Yenikapı İETT Platform; The station will be 750m from the Aksaray tram station with a transfer opportunity.
5	Cerrahpaşa	At-Grade	İETT Bus: 80T	Fatih	Cerrahpaşa Hospital
6	Kocamustafapaşa	At-Grade	İETT Bus: 35, 35A, 35C, 35D, 80T, BN1	Fatih	
7	Yedikule	At-Grade	İETT Bus: 80T, BN1	Fatih	Yedikule Dungeons
8	Kazlıçeşme	Viaduct	İETT Bus: 50K, 80T, 85C, 97E, MR10, MR11, MR20	Zeytinburnu	

== Infrastructure ==
Unlike Istanbul's three other tram lines – namely, T1, T4 and T5 – served by street-running vehicles, T6 uses multi-unit trains following a grade-separated right-of-way. Trains start from the Sirkeci station, where they link to T1 and Marmaray, and then continue along the Kennedy Avenue. From there, the tracks move away from the avenue to link to the Yenikapı Transfer Center, where they meet again with Marmaray as well as M1 and M2 lines. The line then continues together with Marmaray, connecting to its trains at the Kazlıçeşme terminus.

Overall, the line stretches for 8.3 kilometres of mostly at-grade single-track rail. This way, T6 is the shortest of the four tram lines and among Istanbul's shortest non-funicular modern transit lines; it is only longer than M6 in the north of the city.
