= Mandıra–Kırklareli railway =

Mandıra-Kırklareli railway
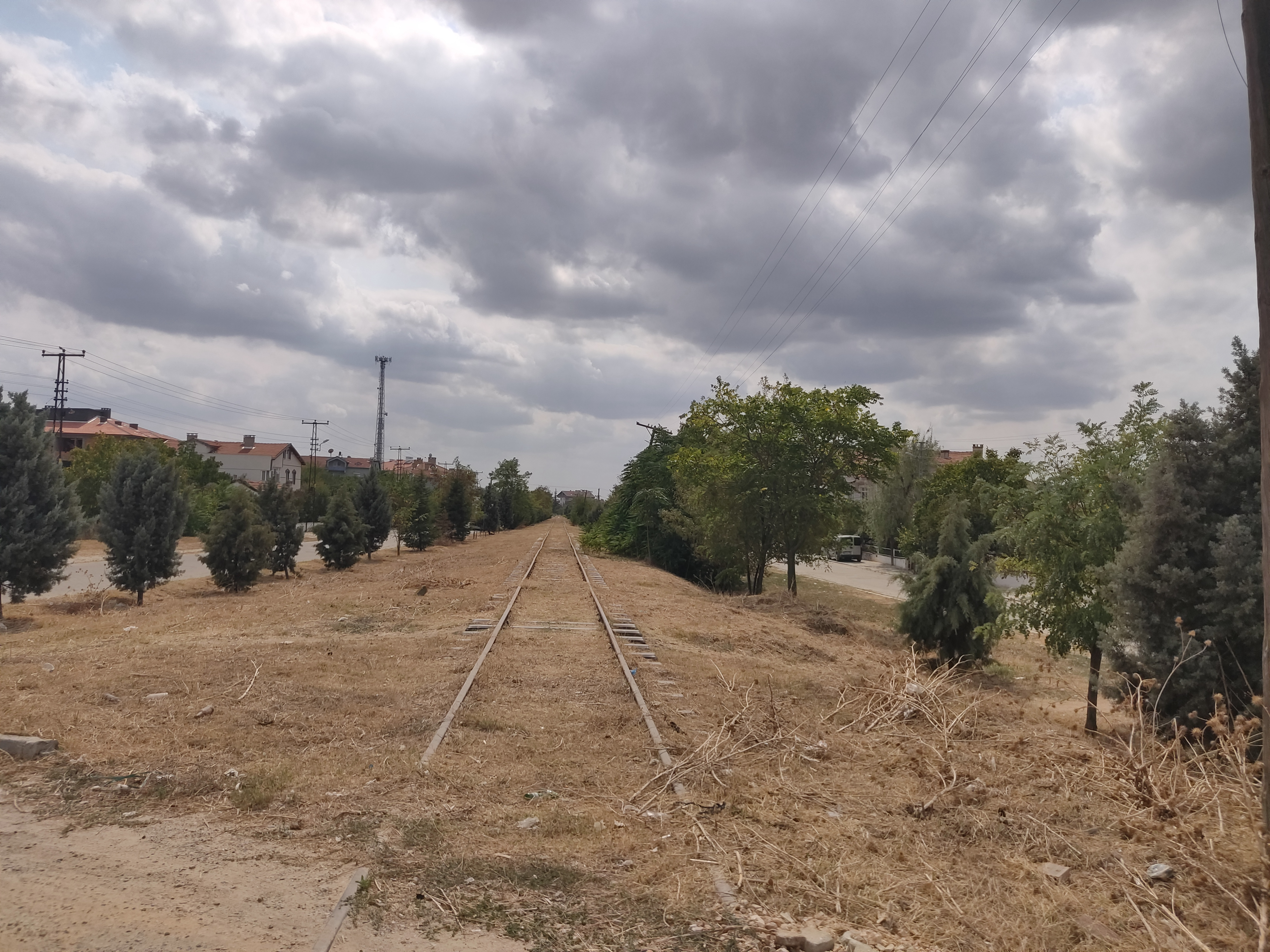
- The railway in Babaeski.

Overview
- Status: Abandoned
- Owner: Turkish State Railways
- Locale: East Thrace
- Termini: Mandıra; Kırklareli
- Stations: 5

Service
- Type: Heavy rail

History
- Opened: 19 June 1912
- Closed: 1987

Technical
- Line length: 45.6 km (28.3 mi)
- Number of tracks: Single track
- Track gauge: 1,435 mm (4 ft 8 1/2 in) standard gauge

The Mandıra-Kırklareli railway (Turkish: Mandıra-Kırklareli demiryolu) was a 45.6 km (28.3 mi) long railway in East Thrace, Turkey. The railway branched off from the Istanbul-Pythio railway near Mandıra and headed north to Kırklareli.
