= Istanbul railway station =

Istanbul railway station commonly refers to:

- Sirkeci railway station, listed on some maps as Istanbul railway station
- Haydarpaşa railway station
