= Istanbul–Çerkezköy Regional =

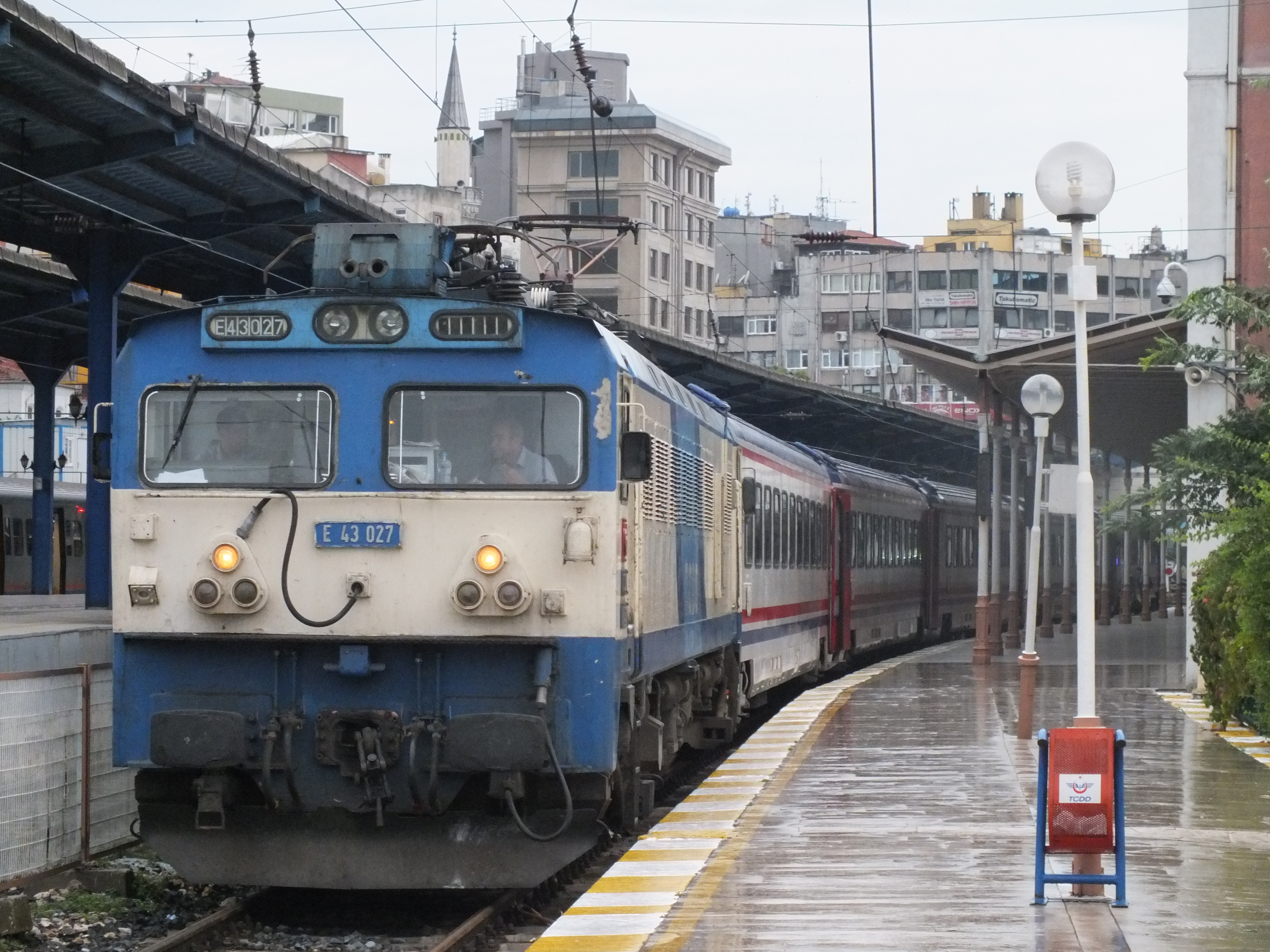
- Train #81602 waiting to depart at Sirkeci Terminal.

Overview
- Service type: Regional
- Status: Operating
- Locale: European Turkey
- Current operator: TCDD

Route
- Termini: Halkalı station, Istanbul; Çerkezköy station, Çerkezköy
- Stops: 4
- Average journey time: 2 hours, 20 minutes
- Service frequency: Daily each way
- Train numbers: 81602 (westbound), 81601 (eastbound)

Technical
- Track gauge: 1,435 mm (4 ft 8 1/2 in)
- Track owner: TCDD

The Istanbul–Çerkezköy Regional is a regional rail service between Sirkeci station in Istanbul and Çerkezköy, a town in Thracian Turkey. Train #81602 operates between Istanbul and Çerkezköy and train #81601 operates between Çerkezköy and Istanbul daily.
