= Istanbul suburban =

Former commuter rail service in Istanbul

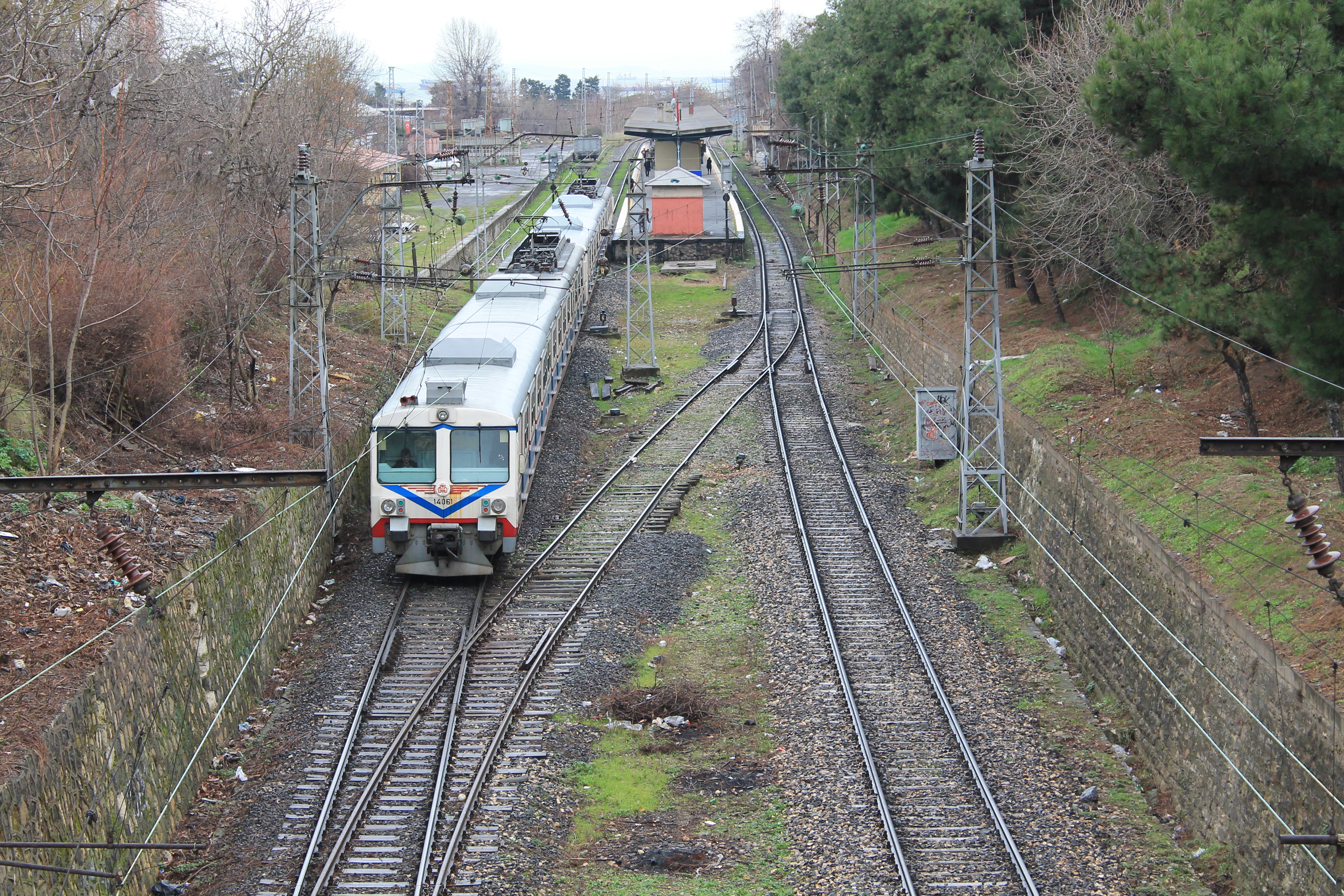
- An eastbound train after departing Zeytinburnu station

Overview
- Status: Discontinued
- Owner: Turkish State Railways
- Locale: Istanbul, Turkey
- Termini: Sirkeci Terminal; Halkalı
- Stations: 19

Service
- Type: Commuter rail
- Operator(s): Turkish State Railways
- Rolling stock: E23000, E14000, E8000 EMUs
- Daily ridership: 22,236 (2008)

History
- Opened: December 4, 1955
- Closed: March 1, 2013

Technical
- Line length: 5771 km
- Track length: 27.60 kilometers (17.1 mi)
- Number of tracks: 2
- Track gauge: 4 ft 8 1/2 in (1,435 mm)
- Electrification: 25 kV AC, 60 Hz
- Operating speed: 40 km/h (25 mph) (average)

The Istanbul suburban railway, locally referred to as B1 (Turkish: Sirkeci Banliyösü), was an important rail line in Istanbul, Turkey. It was operated by the Turkish State Railways and was one of Istanbul's two commuter rail lines (the other being the Haydarpaşa suburban). Carrying an average of 22,200 passengers daily, it was the second-busiest commuter railway in Turkey, after the Haydarpaşa suburban.

The Istanbul Commuter Railway is a historical line, being the first rail line to be electrified and being the first commuter railway in Turkey. Since it opened on December 4, 1955, the E8000 series have been in operation. In the 1970s, the E14000 series came into service and in 2010 the new EUROTEM built E23000 series began service. The line was closed in 2014 and all tracks have been removed for renovation and incorporation into the new Marmaray network which started operation in 2013 between Ayrılıkçeşmesi and Kazlıçeşme.

The eastern terminus was Sirkeci Terminal in the Fatih district in the historical city center. The line curves around the shore of the Eminönü peninsula, below the historic Topkapı Palace, and heads west. Travelling on the southern European shore of Istanbul, the line passes through several important districts, until curving north at Soğuksu to Halkalı.

== Stations ==
Station	Distance (km) from Sirkeci	Rail connections	Other Connections
Sirkeci	0 km (0 mi)	Bosphorus Express; Balkans Express; Istanbul–Kapıkule Regional	Tram: Bus: BN1. Municipal Ferries (Eminönü)
Cankurtaran	2.1 km (1.3 mi)	–	Bus: BN1
Kumkapı	3.8 km (2.4 mi)	–	Bus: BN1
Yenikapı	4.8 km (3.0 mi)	–	Metro: • • Bus: 30D, 31, 31Y, 50Y, 70FY, 70KY, 76A, 77, 88A, 146T, 366Y
Kocamustafapaşa	6.5 km (4.0 mi)	–	Bus: 35, 35C, 35D, 80T, BN1
Yedikule	7.4 km (4.6 mi)	–	Bus: 80T, BN1
Kazlıçeşme	8.6 km (5.3 mi)	–	Bus: 50K, 80T, 85C, 97E, MR10, MR11, MR20
Zeytinburnu	9.7 km (6.0 mi)	–	Bus: 93, 93M, 93T
Yenimahalle	11.8 km (7.3 mi)	–	Bus: 72YT, 97E, BN1, MR20
Bakırköy	12.6 km (7.8 mi)	–	Metro: Bus: 50B, 72YT, 73B, 76, 73B, 76C, 76V, 76Y, 79B, 89YB, 98, 98A, 98AB, 98B, 98D, 98E, 98G, 98H, 98K, 98M, 98MB, 98S, 98T, 98TB, 98Y, 146, BN1, E-57, MR20
Ataköy (closed)	14.7 km (9.1 mi)	–	Metro: Bus: 71T, 73Y
Yeşilyurt	16.5 km (10.3 mi)	–	Bus: 72T, 72YT, 73Y
Yeşilköy	17.6 km (11 mi)	–	Bus: 72T, 72YT, 73Y
Florya	21.1 km (13 mi)	–	Bus: 73B, 73T, 73Y
Menekşe	22.2 km (13.8 mi)	–	Bus: BN1
Küçükçekmece	23.8 km (15 mi)	–	Metro: Metrobus: Bus: 76, 76B, 76C, 76D, 76O, 76Y, 89F, 146, BN1, MK16
Soğuksu	25.2 km (16 mi)	–	Bus: BN1
Kanarya	26.2 km (16 mi)	–	Bus: 89A, BN1, MK16
Halkalı	27.6 km (17 mi)	Istanbul–Kapıkule Regional	Metro: • Bus: 79Y, 89A, 143, BN1, H-3, MR40, MR42, MR50, MR51

== History ==
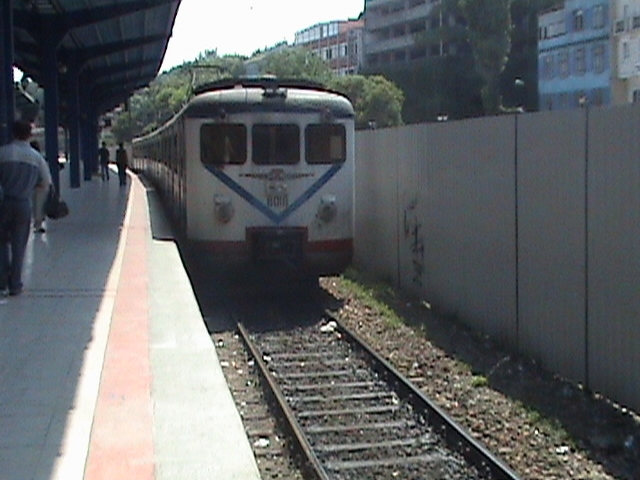
A train arriving at Sirkeci station, with E8000 EMUs, in June 2007.

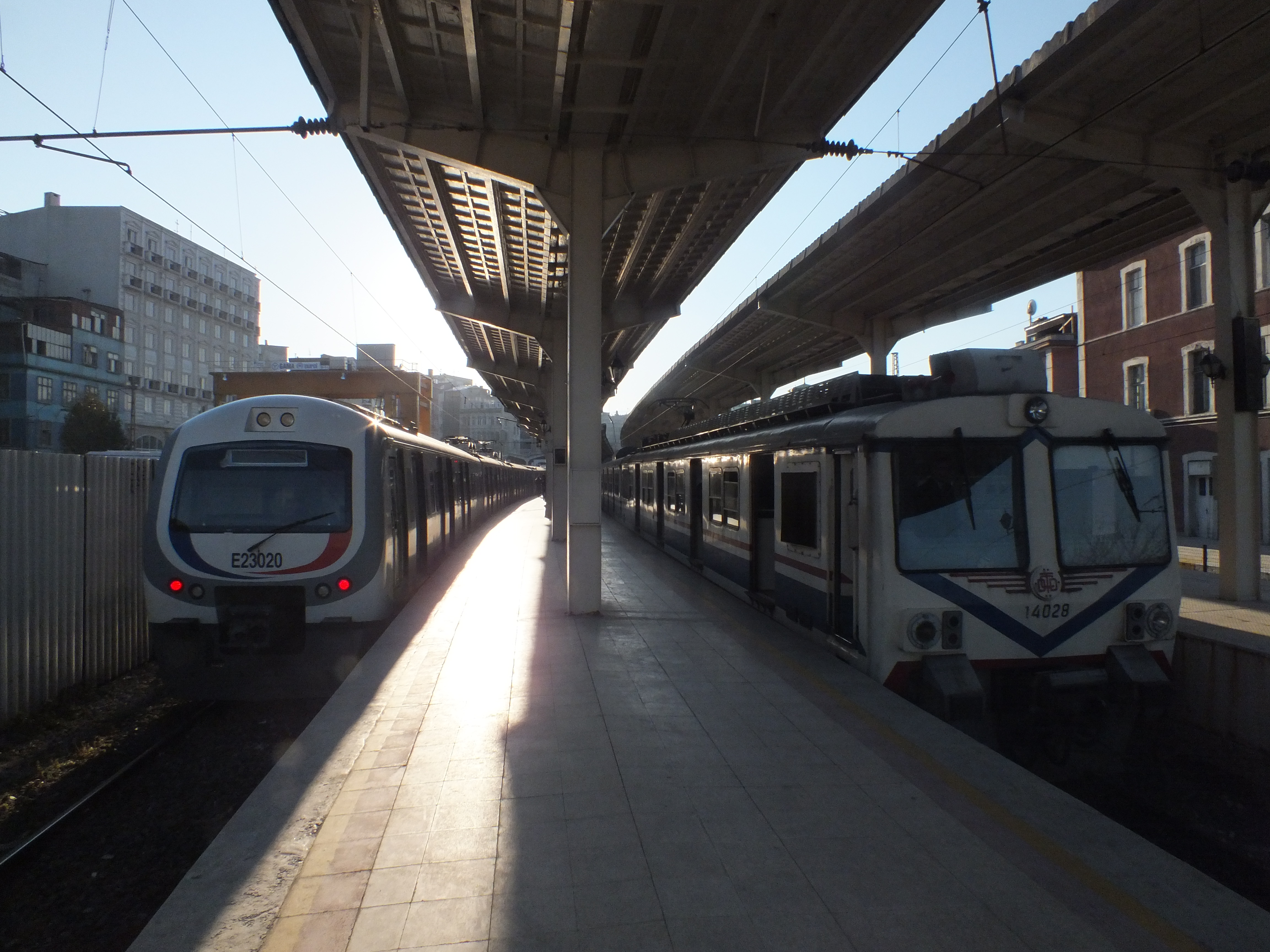
Second (right) and third generation EMUs at Sirkeci station.

The line was originally built by the Oriental Railway (CO) in 1872, as a part of their Istanbul–Vienna main line. The railway started to operate trains, when the line reached Edirne in 1873. The CO was absorbed by the Turkish State Railways (TCDD) in 1937 and TCDD started to operate steam-powered commuter service on the line.

The line was electrified in 25 kV AC in 1955. 25 kV AC electrification technology was quite new at the time, following the 1953 experiments in France and it made TCDD at the forefront in a suburb, seashore environment.

This electrification enabled a frequent commuter service with E8000 EMUs. TCDD took also delivery of three E4000 electric locomotives for hauled trains. In the 1970s, new E14000 EMUs started to appear on the line and in the 1990s, the E4000 locomotives were retired. New E23000 EMUs were put into service on September 19, 2010. With the addition of the new EMUs, the E8000s were finally retired.

In 2003, the Marmaray project started construction of a tunnel underneath the Bosphorus, as well as the upgrade to this line. Plans were finalized, and the line closed on June 19, 2013 for at least 2 years. Part of it has been replaced by the underground Marmaray line though: the Kazlıçeşme station was replaced with a new surface station somewhat closer to central Istanbul, the Yenikapı station was replaced with an underground station, and the stations Yedikule, Kocamustafapaşa, Kumkapı and Cankurtaran were indefinitely closed. A new underground station was built in Sirkeci from where the tunnel under the Bosphorus runs. In June 2015 a plan to renovate and reopen the stations closed as a part of the Marmaray project was conceived with plans to open a new line in 2019, which later turned into the T6 line, opening in February 2024, with surface station in Sirkeci is planned to be the terminus station for future long-distance trains.

== See also ==
- Istanbul–Pythio railway
