= Yedikule =

- Neighbourhood
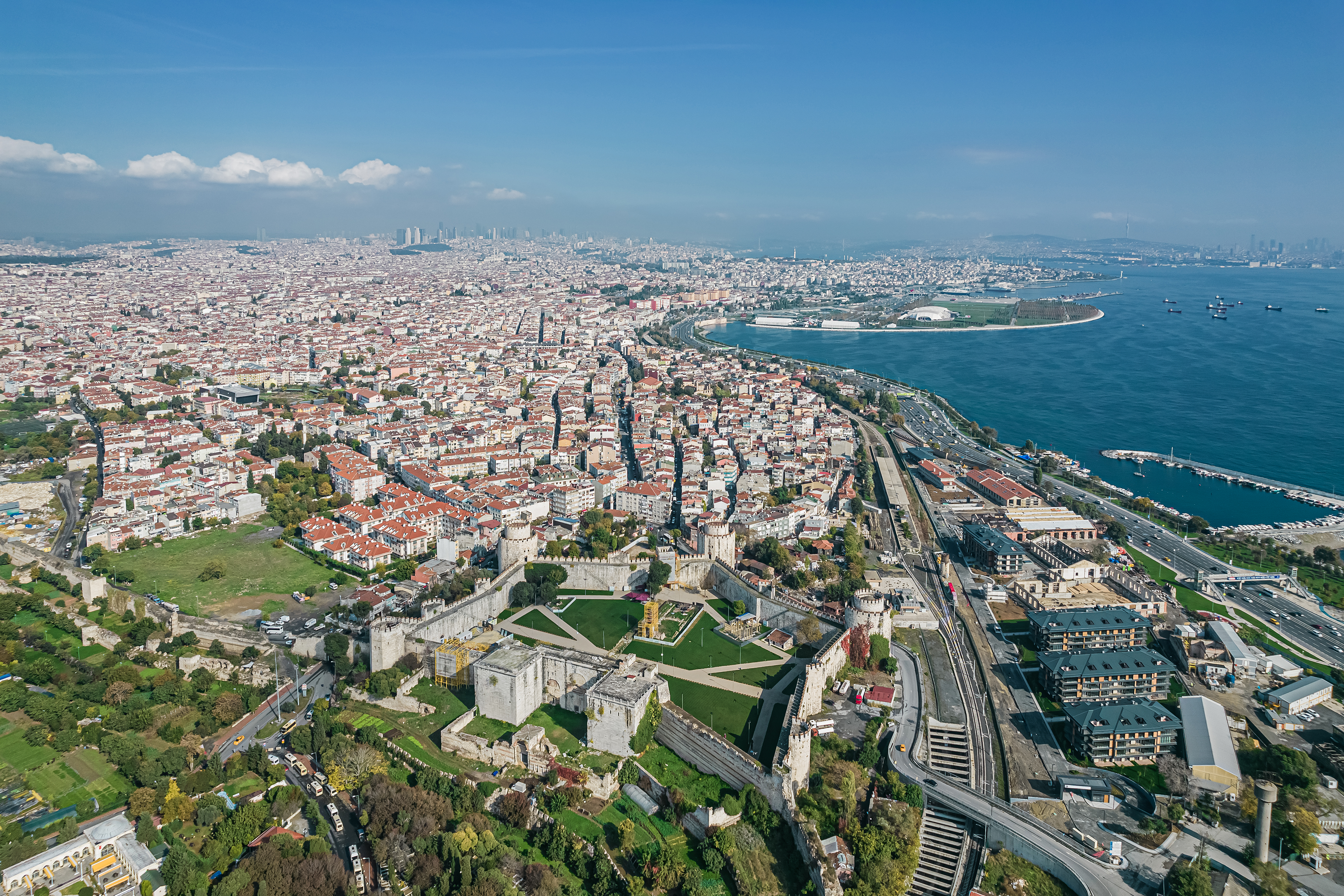
- Yedikule Fortress (lower half of the image) and Fatih

- Location within Turkey Location within Istanbul
- Coordinates: 40.9934°N 28.9231°E
- Country: Turkey
- Province: Istanbul
- District: Fatih
- Population (2022): 15,789
- Time zone: UTC+3 (TRT)
- Area code: 0212

Yedikule (lit. 'Seven Towers') is a neighbourhood in the municipality and district of Fatih, Istanbul Province, Turkey. Its population is 15,789 (2022). It is named after the seven-towered Yedikule Fortress, which surrounds the neighborhood. Urbanized in the 16th century, the neighborhood became a hub for industrial and agricultural activities. Yedikule has a local football team Yedikule GSK that played in the TFF Second League for a season.

Marmaray passes through the neighbourhood, however Yedikule railway station is opened on 2024.

== History ==
Urbanization of Yedikule started in the 16th century, and it became a major hub for industrial and agricultural activities. Yedikule Walls (also known as Theodosius Walls) are also a notable historical artifact. Its tower, Yedikule Fortress, constructed between 408-450 AD, and repaired after 740 Istanbul earthquake.

=== Ottoman period ===
Yedikule was known with its gardens, Yedikule Urban Gardens, which was also famous with its cabbages and lettuces and used more than 1500 years. According to the guarantor books of year 1735, there were 344 gardens (including nine gardens which is established between "Surdibi" area, which stretch between Yedikule Gate and Silivri Gate); according to a map from 1835, there were 102 gardens.

Yedikule (with Edirnekapı) also became host for some establishments like slaughterhouses, soap and candle makers, and workshops.

=== Modern times ===
Yedikule became highly populated after the population boom in Istanbul between 1940s-1980s; and as a result of that, the Urban Gardens and industrial areas became residential areas and some parts of Urban Gardens used for build Otoyol 1 and create waste-filling areas in the 1970s. The municipality of İstanbul started a rehabilitation project for remaining parts of Urban Gardens. Ekrem İmamoğlu, as the Mayor of Istanbul, stated that: "I'm ashamed from that the walls (Yedikule Walls) hasn't been toured since years."

== Soil and seismology ==
A major seismically active fault zone, the North Anatolian Fault, passes offshore from Yedikule in the Sea of Marmara.

== Demographics ==
Yedikule was including a notable non-Muslim population and schools until the recent times. There is also Greek and Armenian churches and an Armenian hospital, Yedikule Surp Pıgiç Hospital. As of 2022, its population is 15,789.

== In popular culture ==
Kazım Koyuncu gave a concert in Yedikule Fortress in 2004. Yedikule also hosted thematic festivals such as Lettuce Feast (Turkish: Marul Bayramı) in the past.

== Gallery ==
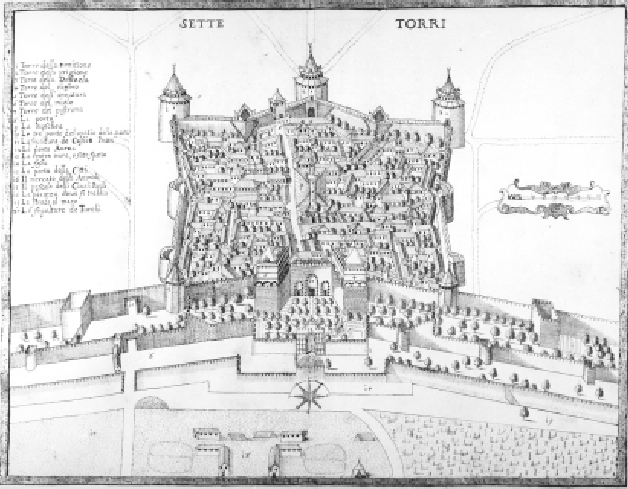
The Yedikule Fortress ("Fortress of the Seven Towers") and the Golden Gate in Istanbul by Fr. Scarella c. 1685

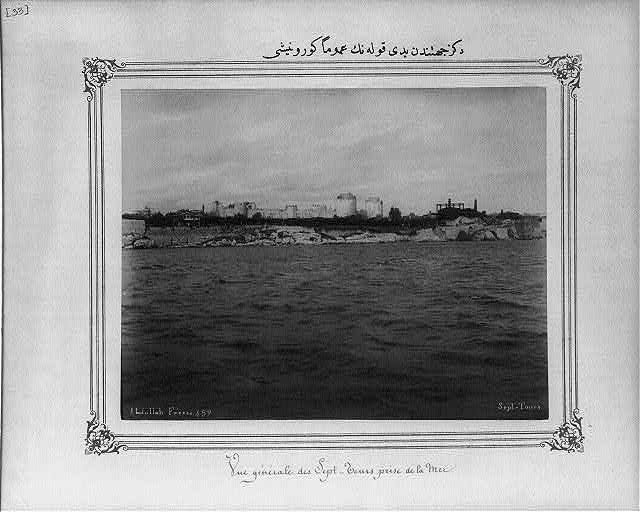
Yedikule from the Marmara Sea, late 19th century

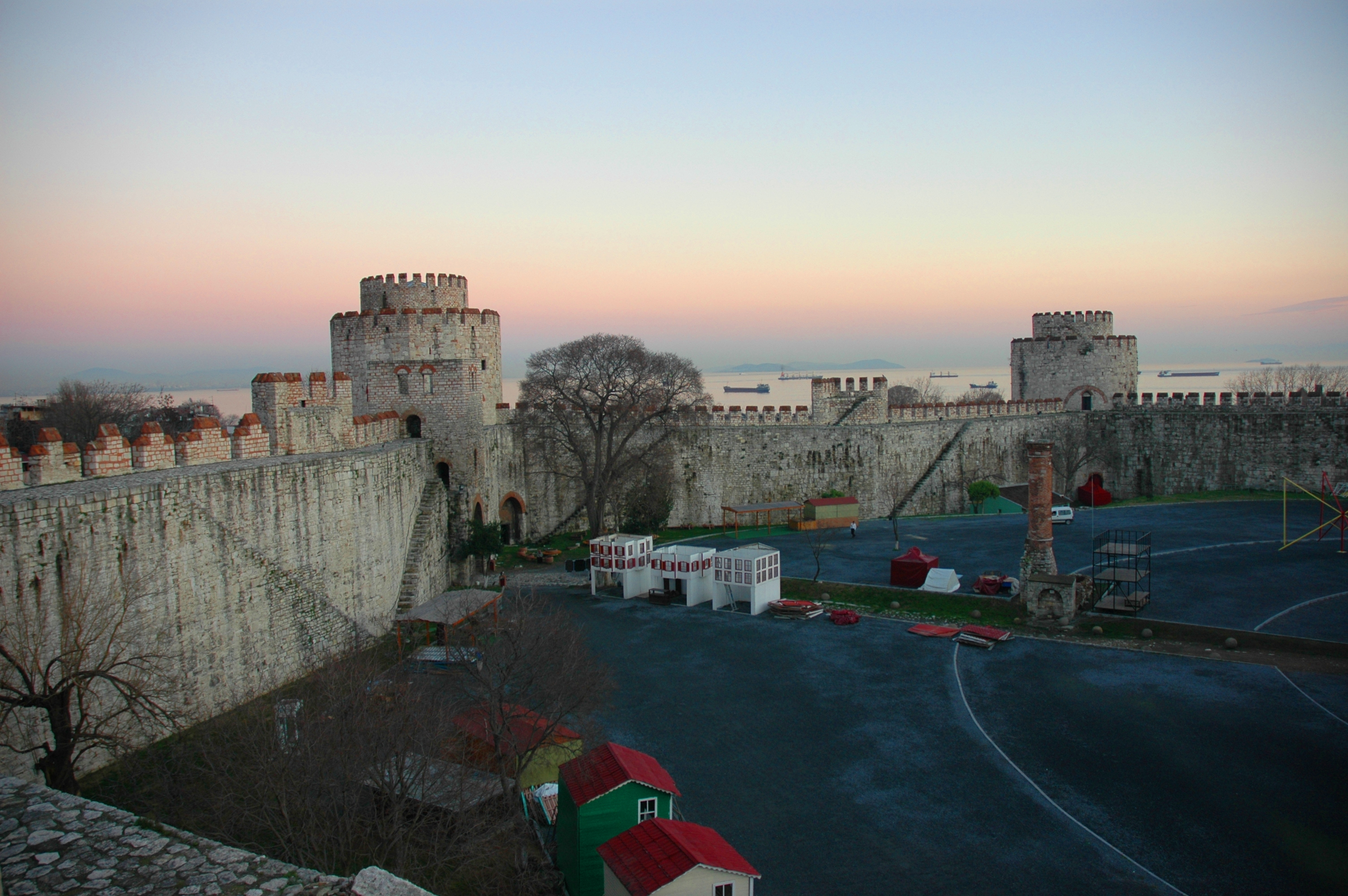
The Fortress in 2008
