= Kazlıçeşme railway station =

Railway station in Istanbul

Coordinates: 40.9927°N 28.9168°E

Kazlıçeşme
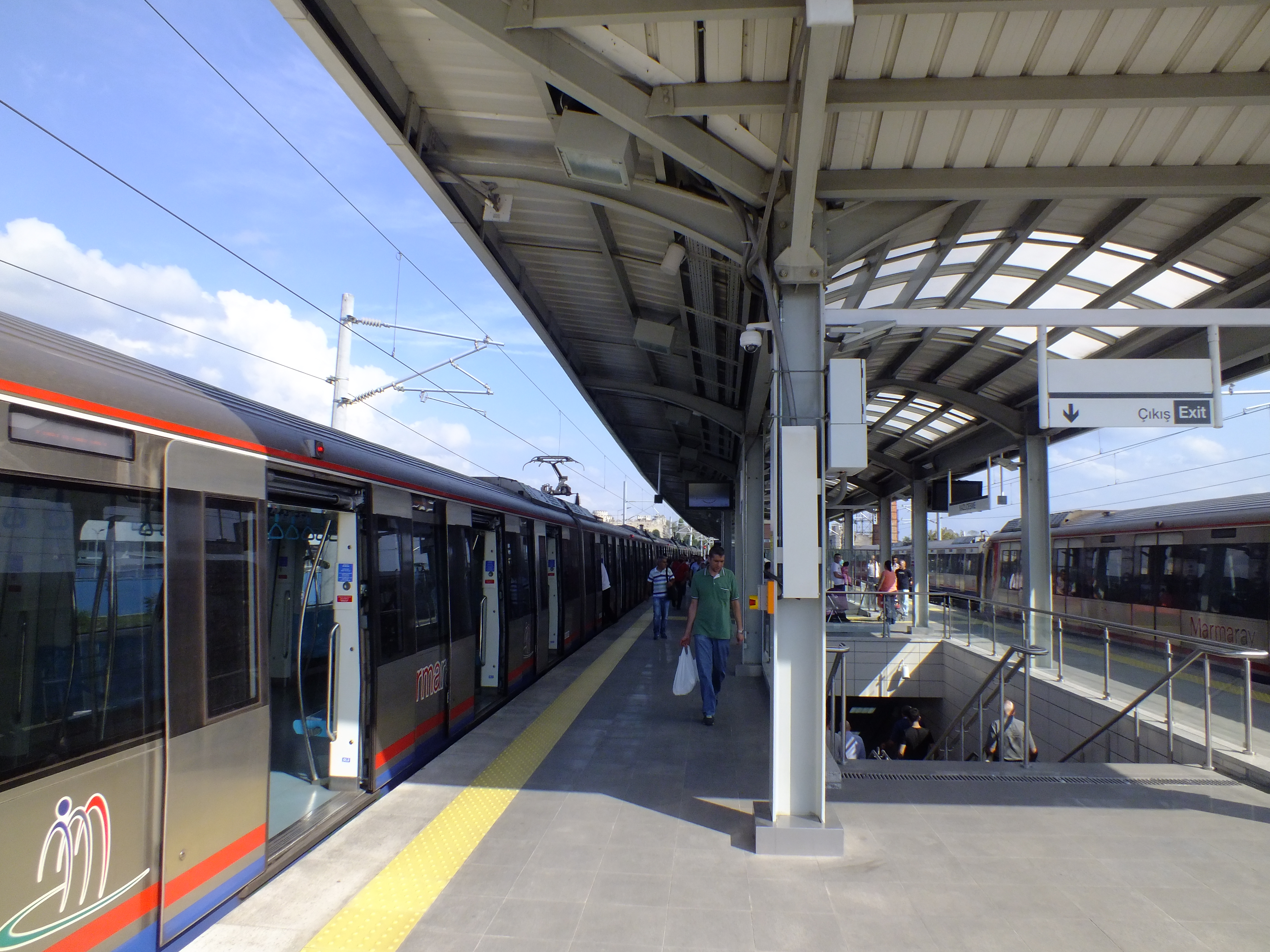

General information
- Location: 10. Yil Cd. and Zakirbaşı Sk., Kazlıçeşme Mah. 34020; Zeytinburnu, Istanbul; Turkey
- System: TCDD Taşımacılık commuter rail station
- Owner: Turkish State Railways
- Lines: Istanbul-Pythion railway Marmaray Tunnel
- Platforms: 2 (1 island platform, 1 side platform)
- Tracks: 3
- Connections: İETT Bus: 50K, 80, 80T, 85C, 97E, MR10, MR11, MR20; Istanbul Minibus: Topkapı–Yenimahalle, Topkapı–Merter

Construction
- Structure type: At-grade
- Accessible: Yes

History
- Opened: 4 December 1955
- Closed: March–October 2013
- Rebuilt: 2013
- Electrified: 1955

Passengers
- 2017: 19,863 Average daily ridership

Services
Preceding station	TCDD Taşımacılık	Following station
Zeytinburnu towards Halkalı	Marmaray	Yenikapı towards Gebze
Terminus	T6	Yedikule towards Sirkeci
Former services
Preceding station	Turkish State Railways	Following station
Zeytinburnu towards Halkalı	Istanbul suburban	Yedikule towards Sirkeci
Track layout
Location

Kazlıçeşme railway station (Turkish: Kazlıçeşme istasyonu) is a railway station in Zeytinburnu, Istanbul and the former terminus of the trans-Bosporus Marmaray commuter rail line. Located just outside of the city's historic walled center, Kazlıçeşme station sits between 10. Yıl Avenue and Zakirbaşı Street. The station is located 8.6 km (5.3 mi) west of Sirkeci station.

== History ==
Kazlıçeşme station was opened on 4 December 1955 by the Turkish State Railways as a stop on the Istanbul suburban line. The original station consisted of an island platform with two tracks, located above Zakirbaşı Street about 270 m (890 ft) west of the contemporary station. Kazlıçeşme was chosen as the western portal of the Marmaray tunnel and the construction of a new station started in 2011. The new station had the same platform design, but added a third track for passing intercity and regional trains. Nearing the completion of the tunnel, Kazlıçeşme station was closed on 1 March 2013 and demolished shortly after. Seven months later, on 29 October 2013, the new Kazlıeşme station opened as the western terminus of Marmaray trains from Ayrılıkçeşmesi in Kadıköy. However, due to contractor issues, phase II of the Marmaray project was delayed, effectively cutting off Kazlıçeşme from the rest of the national rail network for a few years until work restarted in mid-2016. Once phase II completed on March 12, 2019, Kazlıçeşme is a stop on the Halkalı to Gebze commuter rail line.

== Layout ==
Track 1	→ ← Marmaray toward Zeytinburnu or Halkalı
Island platform
Track 2	→ Marmaray toward Maltepe or Gebze →
Track 3	→ ← YHT, Regional, Intercity and freight trains →

== Equipment ==
The railway station features following equipment:

- 2 entrance and exit gates,
- 2 escalators,
- 1 elevator,
- 2 ticket offices,
- 1 ticket vending machine,
- 1 credit loading machine for electronic tickets,
- 8 turnstiles including 2 for physically handicapped people and
- 10 passenger information screens.
