= Yedikule Fortress =

Fortress in Istanbul

- Fatih, Istanbul, Turkey
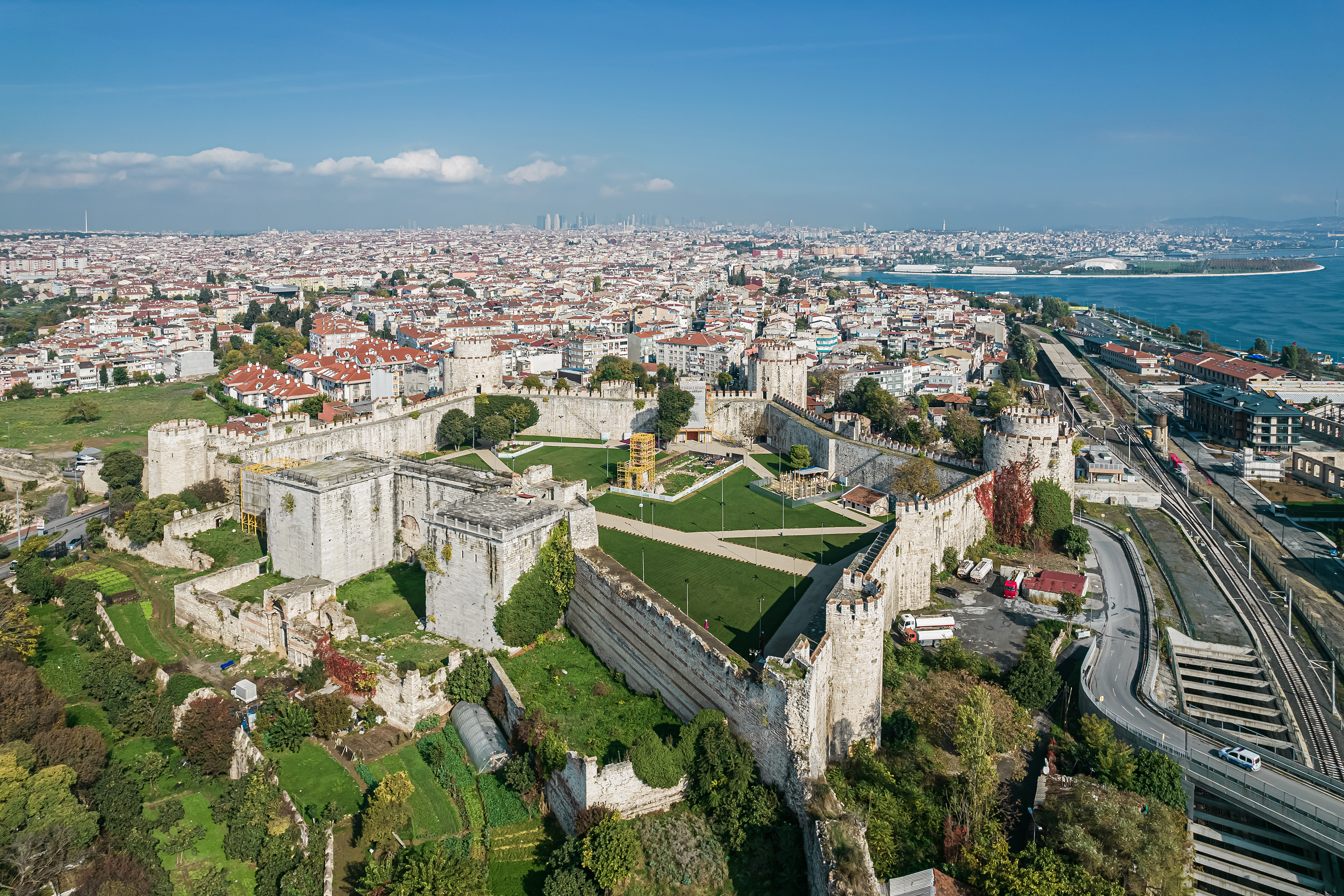
- Aerial photograph of Yedikule Fortress

Site information
- Type: Castle

Location
- Location within Istanbul Fatih
- Coordinates: 40.9933525°N 28.923093°E

Site history
- Built: 1458
- Built by: Mehmed II

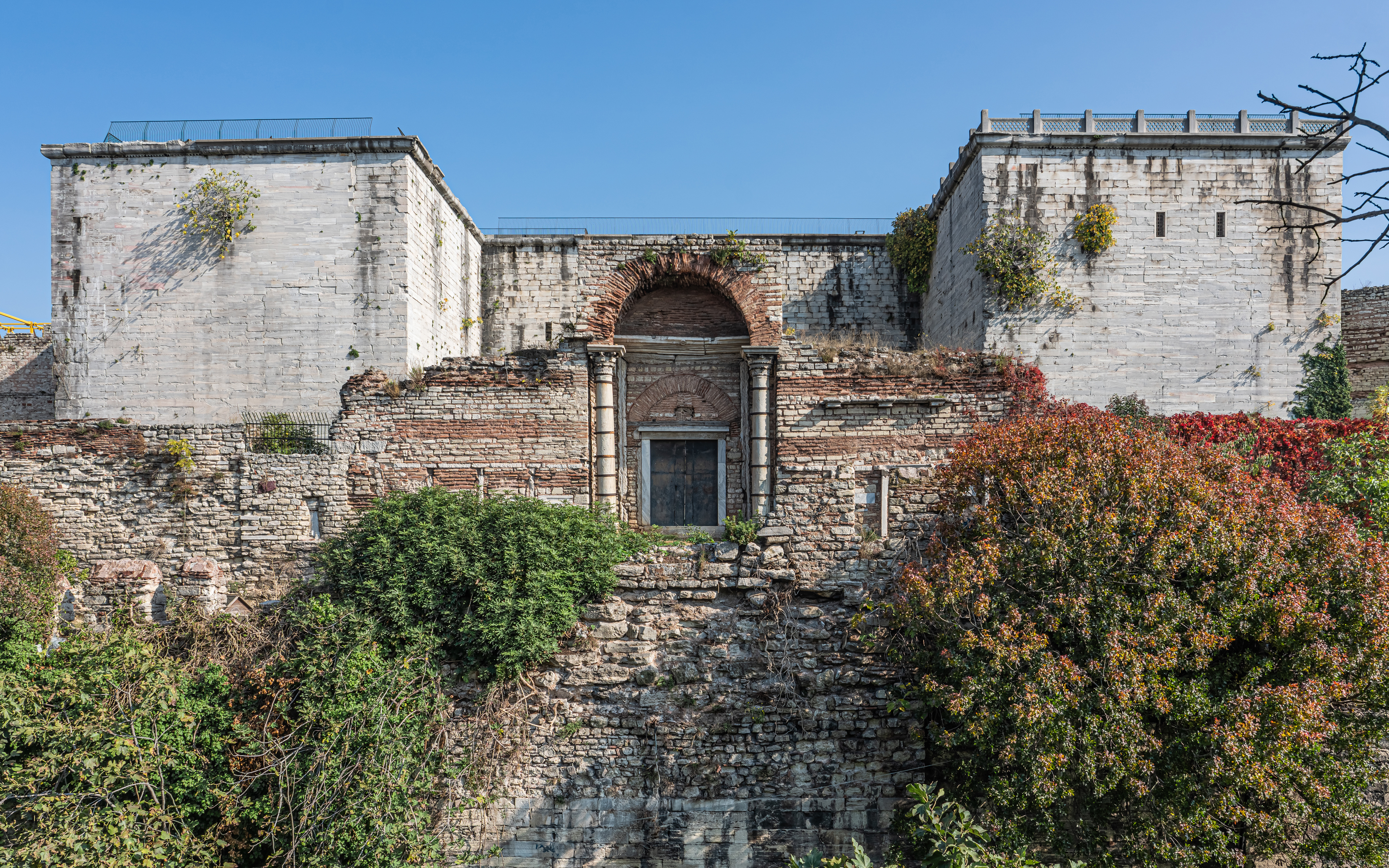
Golden Gate of Yedikule

Yedikule Fortress (Turkish: Yedikule Hisarı or Yedikule Zindanları; meaning "Fortress of the Seven Towers") is a fortified historic structure located in the Yedikule neighbourhood of Fatih, in Istanbul, Turkey.

Built in 1458 on the commission of Ottoman Sultan Mehmed II, the seven-tower complex was created by adding three new towers and fully enclosing a section of the ancient Walls of Constantinople, including the twin towers that originally constituted the triumphal Golden Gate (Turkish: Altınkapı) built by Roman Emperors Theodosius I and Theodosius II.

The fortress came to be known as the home of a formidable royal dungeon that housed notable figures throughout its history, and the associated intrigue captured the public's imagination over the centuries in various legends, stories, and the arts.

== History ==
After the conquest of Constantinople the Sultan gave priority to official construction projects such as Yedikule and his first seraglio, Saray-i Atik. Yedikule, Fortress of Seven Towers, was erected as the official treasury fort of the Empire around the year 1457 (Özgüven 1996: 95–99). Witnesses described the building as one of the palaces of the Sultan. Each tower of the Yedikule functioned as the storage of precious goods, documents, armoury, coins, and golden and silver ingots. Sultan knew well from his ancestors that protection of the fort was one of the high-priority matters of state (Clavijo 1970: 187–188). That the structure was built as a fortress points out the existence of a military outpost in charge of defending the official treasury against hostile attacks. The treasury was later transferred to the inner section of the Topkapı Palace in the sixteenth century and thereafter Seven Towers became the prison of prestigious captives.

Yedikule was built on the shores of the Sea of Marmara, at what was formerly the principal entrance gate to the city. Two towers and two pylons of the former Porta Aurea, the triumphal arch, were inherited from the Byzantine city walls. Three original round towers were added for creating an almost pentagonal plan. When a line is drawn from the midpoint of the former Porta Aurea towards the Ottoman tower in the middle, the axis divides the fortress in two symmetrical parts. A small domed structure, the Conqueror’s Mosque, appears as the focal point of the fortress courtyard, which also marks the midpoint of the axis of symmetry (Gabriel).

Yedikule Fortress was frequently used as a state prison, and ambassadors of states currently at war with the Ottoman Porte were usually imprisoned within its walls. The fortress also housed prisoners who were victims of palace intrigue and infighting, as well as political opponents of the imperial court. Among Yedikule's most notable prisoners was the young Sultan Osman II, who was imprisoned and executed there by the Janissaries in 1622. The last Emperor of Trebizond David Megas Komnenos, King Simon I of Kartli, and a number of leading Ottoman pashas were also among those executed there. In 1768, the Russian ambassador Aleksei Mikhailovich Obreskov, and the entire Russian embassy's staff, was imprisoned here, marking the Ottomans’ declaration of war on Russia.

During the Napoleonic Wars, the fortress was the prison of many French prisoners, including the writer and diplomat François Pouqueville, who was detained there for more than two years (1799 to 1801) and who gave an extensive description of the fortress in his Voyage en Morée, à Constantinople, en Albanie, et dans plusieurs autres parties de l'Empire Othoman, pendant les années 1798, 1799, 1800 et 1801. The last prisoner was held in the Yedikule as late as 1837. Except for the initial 11 and last 4 sentences, all of the 1961 Nobel Prize for Literature winner Ivo Andrić's novel Prokleta avlija (translated into English as Accursed or Damned Yard) happens in Yedikule Prison.

A mescit (small mosque) and a fountain were built in the middle of the fort's inner courtyard, which also contained the houses of the garrison, forming a separate city quarter. The houses were torn down in the 19th century, and a girls' school was built in their place. The outer gate was re-opened in 1838, and the fort's towers functioned as gunpowder magazines for a while thereafter, until the whole facility was turned over to become a museum in 1895.

An open-air theater has been built in more recent years, and is used for cultural festivals. Like its namesake in Jerusalem, a Muslim cemetery now lies in front of the Golden Gate.

== Notable prisoners ==
- David of Trebizond, last Emperor of Trebizond (1463)
- Andrea Gritti, Venetian merchant and later Doge of Venice (1499–1502)
- Simon I of Kartli, Georgian king of Kartli (1599–1611)
- Future Crimean khans Mehmed III Giray (c. 1610), Selâmet I Giray (c. 1607)
- Stefan Potocki, voivode of Bratslav (1612)
- Samuel Korecki, Polish duke, nobleman (szlachcic) of the Polish–Lithuanian Commonwealth (1620–1622)
- Osman II, Sultan of the Ottoman Empire (1622)
- Jakab Harsányi Nagy, Hungarian Turkologist and diplomat (1657–1658)
- Bálint Török, Hungarian aristocrat
- Vasile Lupu, Voivode of Moldavia (1661)
- Pyotr Andreyevich Tolstoy, Russian statesman and diplomat (1710–1714)
- Constantin Brâncoveanu, Prince of Wallachia (1714)
- Barthélemy de Lesseps, French diplomat (1798–1801)
- François Pouqueville, French diplomat (1799–1801)
- Kadri Prishtina, Albanian politician (1904–1908)

== See also ==
- Rumelihisarı
- Anadoluhisarı
- Fall of Constantinople
- Ottoman architecture
- Bosphorus

== Sources ==
- Meyer-Plath, Bruno; Schneider, Alfons Maria (1943), Die Landmauer von Konstantinopel, Teil II (in German), Berlin: W. de Gruyter & Co.
