= Istanbul–Pythio railway =

Major train link in Thrace

Istanbul-Pythio railway
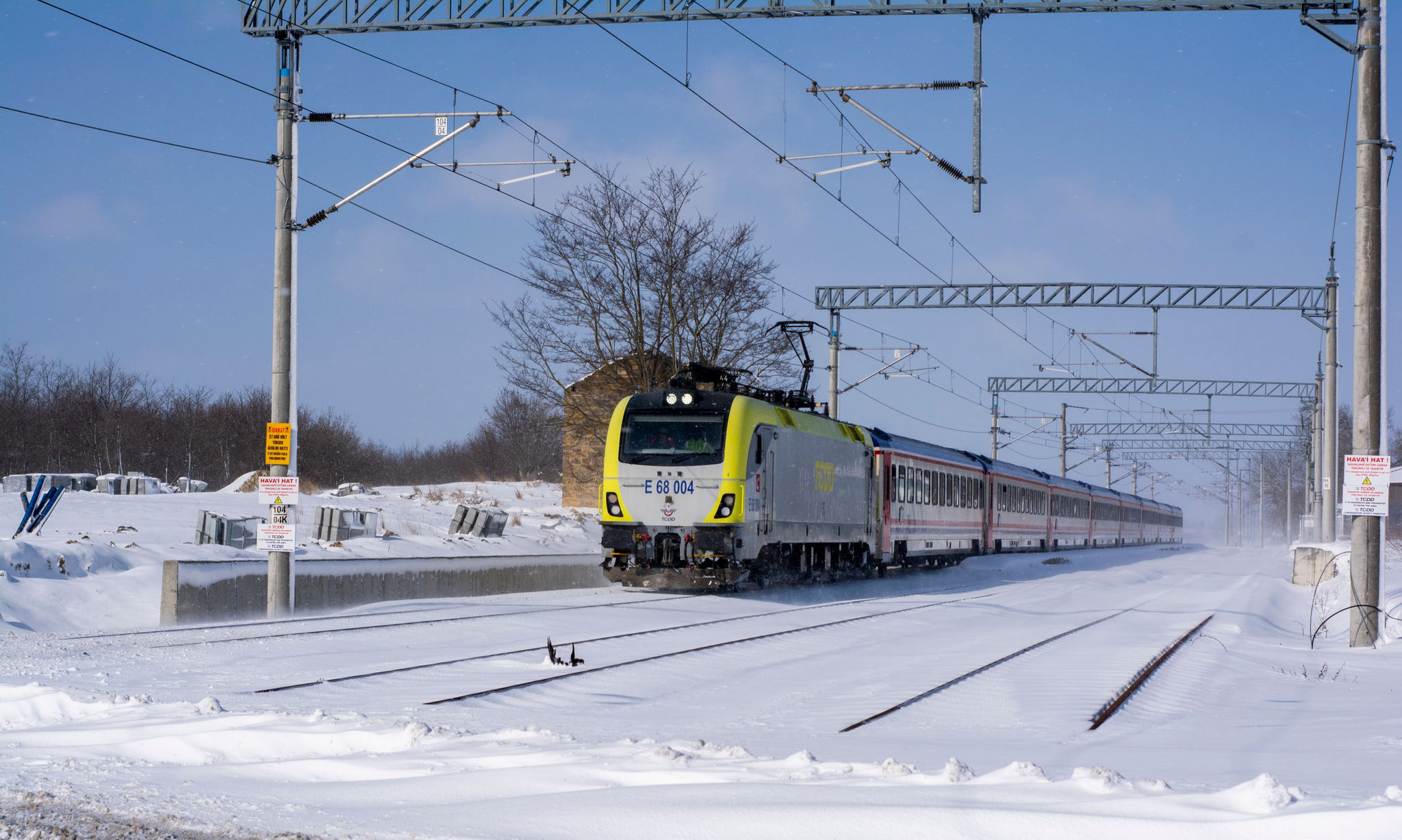
- An E68000 electric locomotive pulling a regional express train to Kapıkule.

Overview
- Status: Operational
- Owner: Turkish State Railways (Istanbul-Hudut); Hellenic Railways Organization (Hudut-Pythio)
- Locale: East Thrace
- Termini: Istanbul, Turkey; Pythio, Greece

Service
- Type: Heavy rail
- System: Turkish State Railways

History
- Opened: 4 April 1873

Technical
- Line length: 281.4 km (174.9 mi)
- Number of tracks: Single track (Sirkeci-Kazlıçeşme); Triple track (Kazlıçeşme-Halkalı); Single track (Halkalı-Demirköprü)
- Track gauge: 1,435 mm (4 ft 8 1/2 in) standard gauge
- Electrification: 25 kV (Istanbul-Pehlivanköy)
- Operating speed: 100 km/h (62 mph)

The İstanbul–Pythio railway is the main railway line in Eastern Thrace and is the Turkish State Railways trunk line to Europe. It was built in 1873 as part of the Chemins de fer Orientaux main line between İstanbul and Belgrade. It is 281.4 km (174.9 mi) long. The line is an important freight corridor for the country.

== Route ==
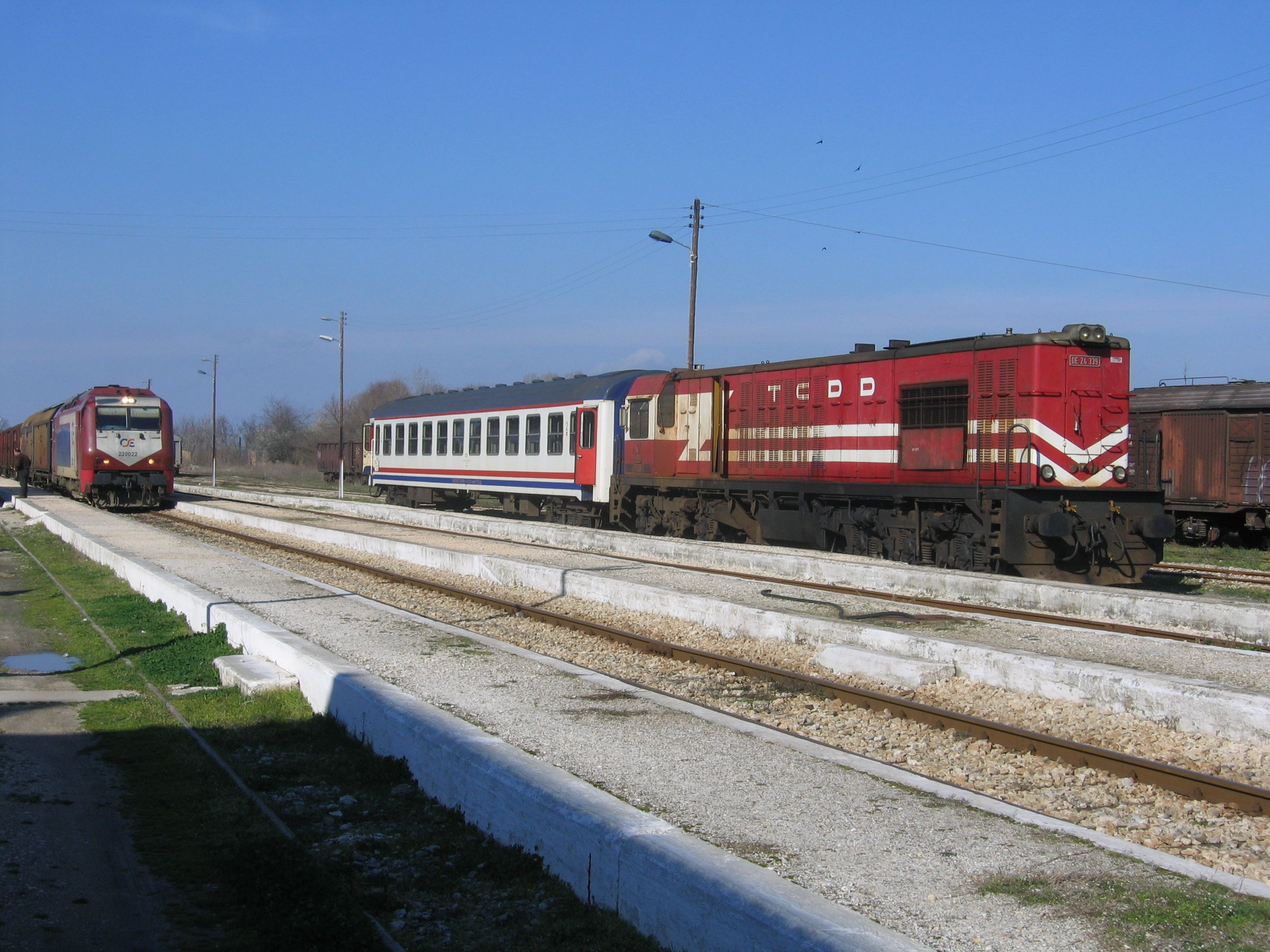
The western end of the railway; Pythio, Greece.

The line starts in Istanbul Sirkeci station, almost next to the Golden Horn mouth. It then follows the Marmara seashore to exit the city, passing the Istanbul walls at Yedikule. It then goes through the suburb to Halkalı, the current endpoint of the double track. From there, the line goes North for a few kilometres to go around a lake before resuming its course westward.

At Çatalca, the line will start climbing at an average rate of 6‰ to a 200m high point near the Kurfallı station. It will then descend back to Çerkezköy station. From there, the line will follow the Ergene River all the way until Uzunköprü station, at an average altitude of 50m.

From Uzunköprü station, the line will turn North West to reach the Meriç River where it will cross the current border to Greece to reach the Pythio station. The river crossing is done over a metallic bridge.

== History ==
When the line opened, it fell entirely within the Ottoman Empire. However, after World War I, a new border was established between Greece and Turkey. The line from Pythio to Edirne fell within Greek territory, and only the İstanbul-Demirköprü section still remained in Turkish territory. In 1971, the State railways built a new line from Pehlivanköy to the Bulgarian border at Kapıkule, bypassing Greek territory. The original line to Pythio is still used for connections to Greece.

== See also ==
- Istanbul suburban for details between Sirkeci and Halkalı
- Çorlu train derailment occurred on 8 July 2018, caused by a damaged track structure following heavy rainfall. The accident resulted in derailed five of six cars, 24 dead and 318 injured passengers, including 42 severely.
