= Sirkeci railway station =

Historic railway station in Istanbul

İstanbul
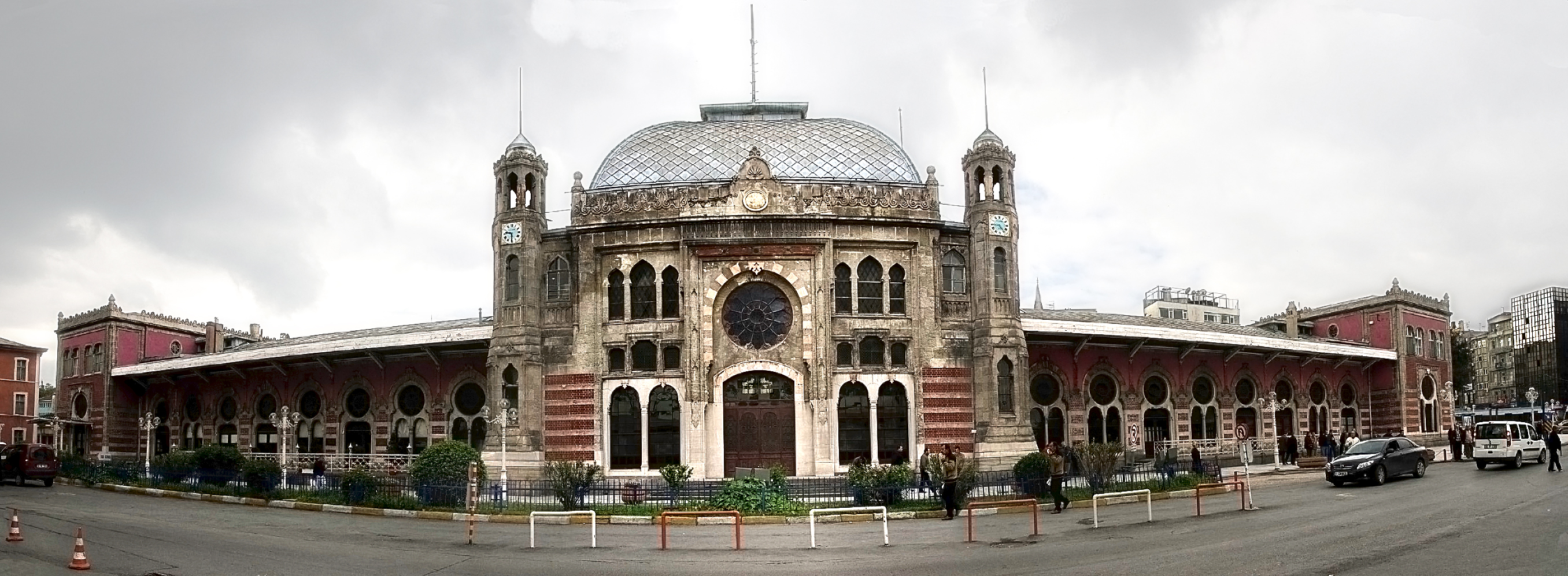
- The front facade of the station

General information
- Location: Sirkeci İstasyon Cd. 2, Hoca Paşa Mah., 34110; Sirkeci, Fatih, Istanbul; Turkey
- Coordinates: 41.015000°N 28.977222°E
- Owner: Turkish State Railways
- Line: Istanbul-Pythion railway
- Platforms: 4 (3 bay platforms, 1 island platform)
- Tracks: 7
- Connections: Istanbul Tram at Sirkeci; Şehir Hatları at Eminönü Pier; İDO at Sirkeci Pier; İETT Bus: 81, BN1, BN2

Construction
- Structure type: At-grade
- Platform levels: 2
- Parking: Yes
- Accessible: Yes

History
- Opened: 27 July 1872; 154 years ago
- Closed: 2013
- Rebuilt: 1890, 2013; 26 February 2024; 2 years ago (platforms)
- Electrified: 25 kV AC, 50 Hz OHLE

Services
Preceding station	TCDD Taşımacılık	Following station
Cankurtaran towards Kazlıçeşme	T6	Terminus
Preceding station	Venice Simplon-Orient-Express	Following station
Sinaia towards Paris-Est	Paris–Istanbul	Terminus
Former services
Preceding station	Turkish State Railways	Following station
Halkalı towards Belgrade	Balkan Express	Terminus
Halkalı towards Thessaloniki	Friendship Express	Terminus
Cankurtaran towards Halkalı	Istanbul suburban	Terminus
Location

Sirkeci railway station (Turkish: Sirkeci garı), listed on maps as Istanbul railway station (Turkish: İstanbul garı), is a railway terminal in Istanbul, Turkey. The terminal is located in Sirkeci, on the tip of Istanbul's historic peninsula, right next to the Golden Horn and just northwest of Gülhane Park and the Topkapı Palace.

Sirkeci Terminal on the European side of the Bosporus strait, along with Haydarpaşa Terminal on the Asian side, are Istanbul's two intercity and commuter railway terminals. Built in 1890 by the Oriental Railway as the eastern terminus of the world-famous Orient Express that once operated between Paris and Istanbul in the period between 1883 and 2009, Sirkeci Terminal has become a symbol of the city.

As of 19 March 2013, service to the station was indefinitely suspended due to the rehabilitation of the existing line between Kazlıçeşme and Halkalı for the new Marmaray commuter rail line. On 29 October 2013, a new underground station was opened to the public and is serviced by Marmaray trains travelling across the Bosphorus. The station reopened on 26 February 2024 as part of T6 Sirkeci–Kazlıçeşme Tramway Line / U3 Sirkeci–Kazlıçeşme Rail Line.

Sirkeci Terminal has a total of 4 platforms (3 above, 1 underground) with 7 tracks (5 above, 2 underground). Formerly, commuter trains to Halkalı would depart from tracks 2, 3 and 4; while regional trains to Kapıkule, Edirne and Uzunköprü, along with international trains to Bucharest, Sofia and Belgrade would depart from tracks 1 and 5.

== History ==
After the Crimean War, the Ottoman authorities concluded that a railway connecting Europe with Istanbul was necessary. The first contract was signed with Labro, a British member of parliament, in January 1857. The contract was cancelled three months later because Labro was unable to provide the investment capital required. Similar second and third contracts signed with British and Belgian entrepreneurs in 1860 and 1868 ended with the same result.

On 17 April 1869 the concession for the "Rumeli Railroad" was awarded to Baron Maurice de Hirsch (Moritz Freiherr Hirsch auf Gereuth), a Bavaria-born banker from Belgium. The project foresaw a route from Istanbul via Edirne, Plovdiv and Sarajevo to the shore of the Sava River.

The construction of the first 15 kilometres (9.3 mi) from Istanbul to Halkalı began on 4 June 1870 and was completed on 4 January 1871. An extension of the line to Sirkeci was demanded as the starting point since Yeşilköy was too far away from Eminönü, the main business district of that epoch. The first proposed option for the line was a route from Beyazit down to the shore of the Golden Horn. The Ottoman Sultan Abdülaziz decided and permitted the route to run on the shoreline of the Sea of Marmara bordering the walls of Topkapı Palace's lower garden.

The extension line was completed on 21 July 1872. In 1873, a "temporary" terminus station in Sirkeci was built.

== The terminal building ==
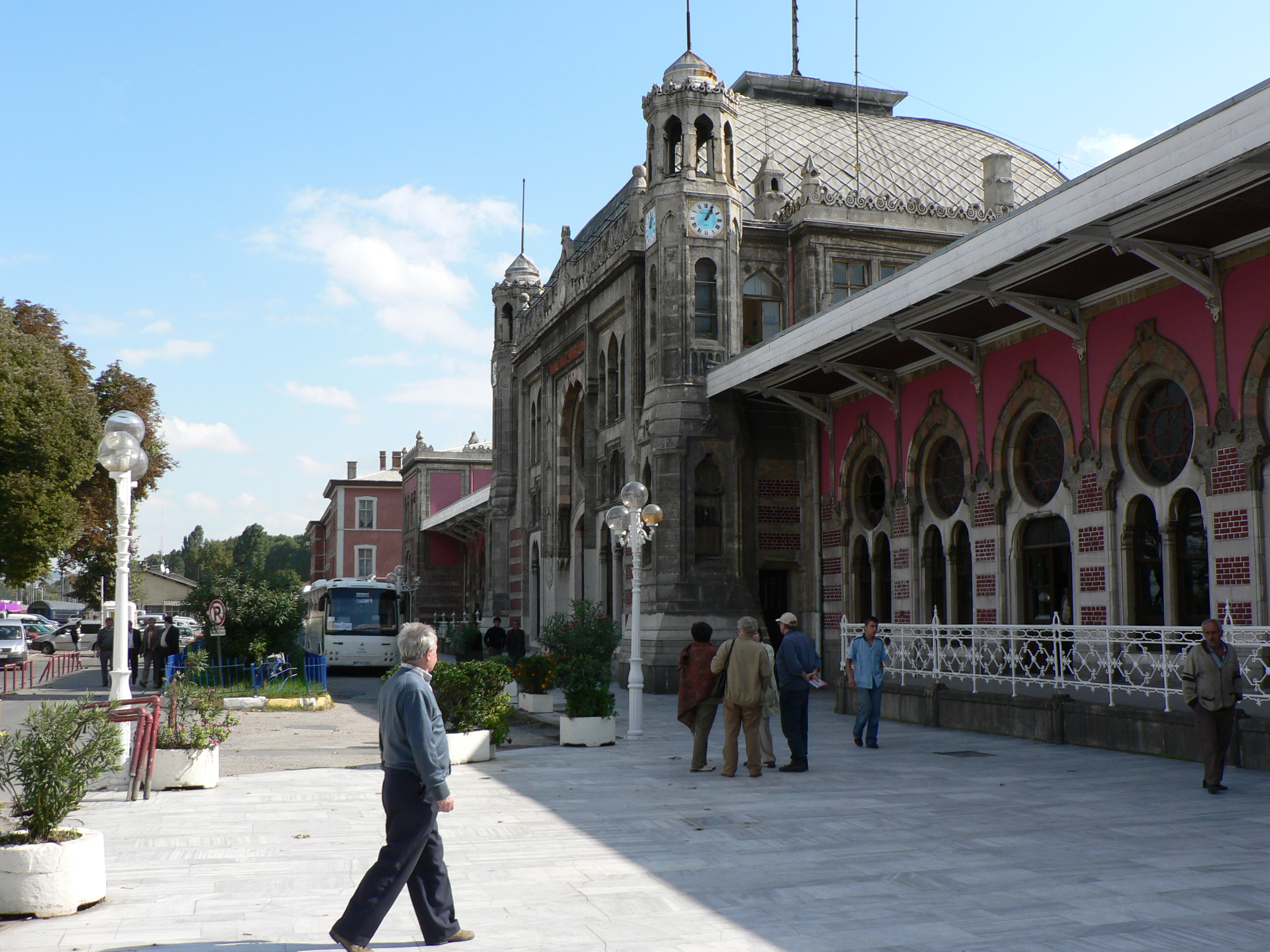
A lateral view of the Sirkeci Terminal.

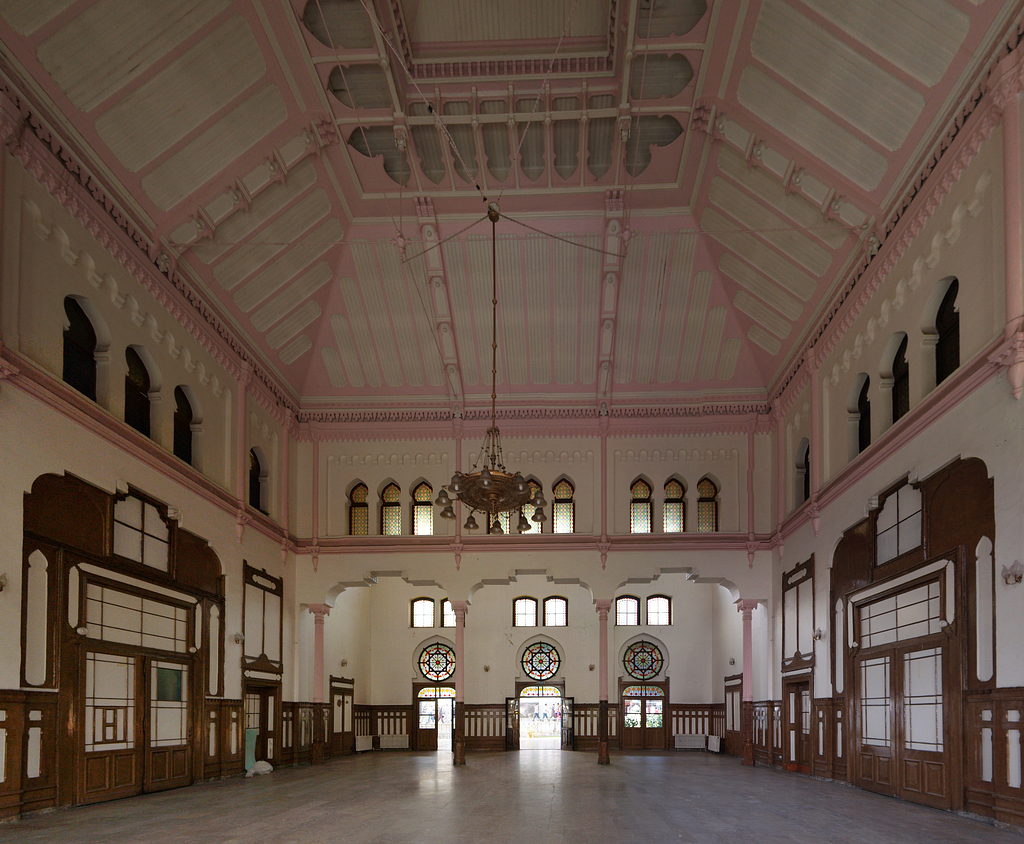
An interior view of the Sirkeci Terminal.

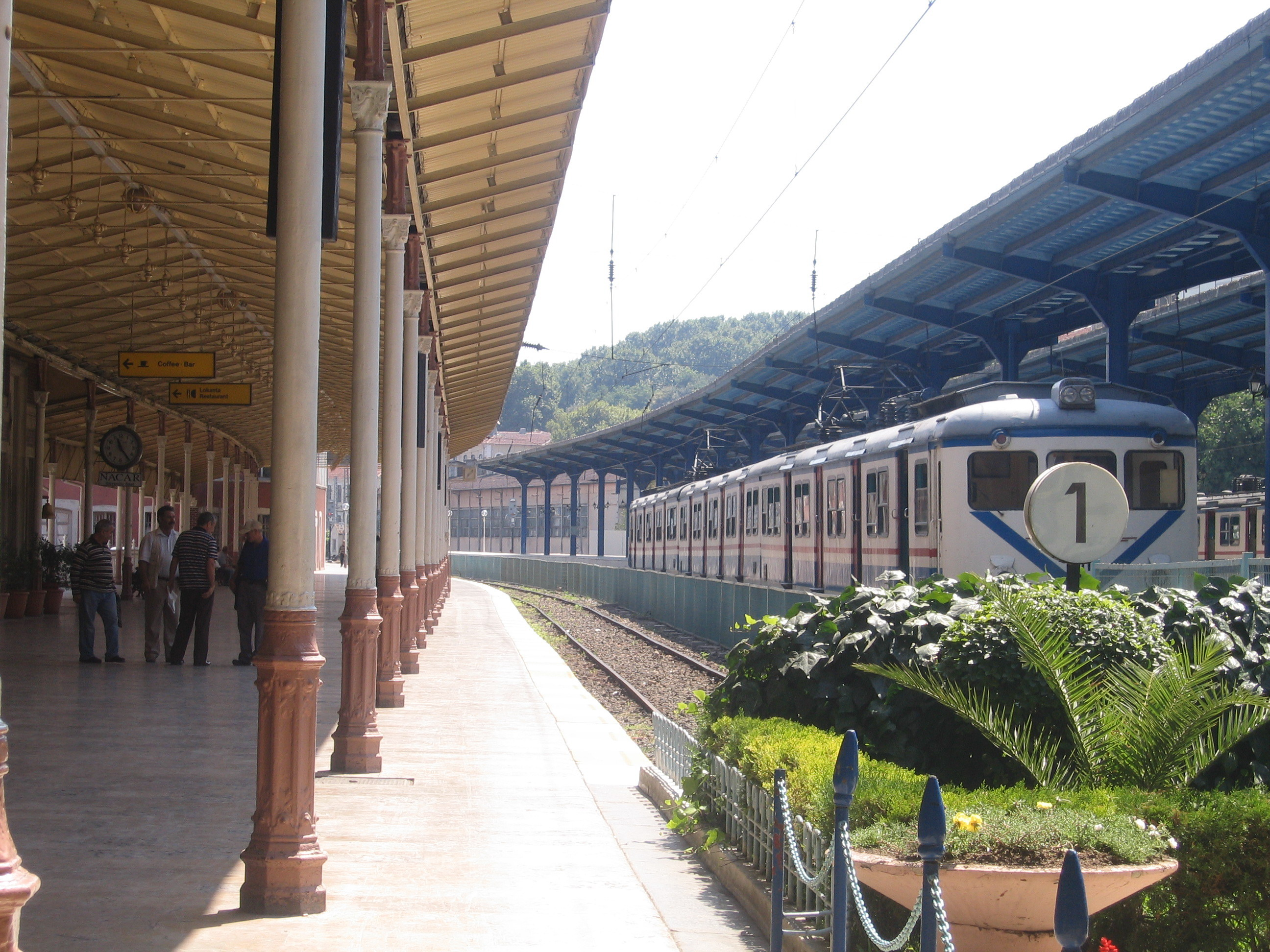
Railroad tracks of the Sirkeci Terminal.

The construction of a new terminal building began on 11 February 1888. The terminus, which was initially named "Müşir Ahmet Paşa Station", was opened on 3 November 1890, replacing the temporary one.

The architect of the project was August Jasmund, a Prussian who was sent to Istanbul by the German government in order to study Ottoman architecture, but lectured architectural design at the School of Polytechnics in Istanbul (now Istanbul Technical University).

The terminal building which rises on an area of 1,200 m^{2} (13,000 sq ft) is one of the most famous examples of European Orientalism, and has influenced the designs of other architects. The building was also modern, having gas lighting and heating provided by large tile stoves, made in Austria, in winter.

The terminal restaurant became a meeting point for journalists, writers and other prominent people from the media in the 1950s and 1960s. The same restaurant, today called "Orient Express", is a popular spot among tourists.

The station is preserved in its original state, but the areas around the terminal building have largely changed since 1890. The Istanbul Railway Museum, which opened in September 2005, is located in the station.

Members of the Mevlevi Dervish order regularly conduct ceremonies at Sirkeci Terminal, which tourists and other members of the public can observe for an admission fee.

== International lines ==
Until 2013, the terminal was the endpoint of the lines connecting Turkey to the rest of Europe. It connected to two neighbouring countries.

One service connected Istanbul with Thessaloniki in Greece - this so-called Friendship Express was stopped in 2011 in the wake of the Greek government-debt crisis, but is planned to be reinstated.

The other service was the Bosphorus Express, running daily between Sirkeci and Gara de Nord in Bucharest, Romania, with connecting cars to Sofia and historically to Belgrade. This train still reaches Istanbul, but now terminates at Halkali.

== Orient Express ==
On 4 October 1883, the first Orient Express departed from the Gare de l'Est in Paris, with farewell music from Mozart's Turkish March. The train was a project of Belgian businessman Georges Nagelmackers. The route passed through Strasbourg, Karlsruhe, Stuttgart, Ulm, and Munich in Germany, Vienna in Austria, Budapest in Hungary, Bucharest in Romania, Rousse and Varna in Bulgaria, ending in Sirkeci. The journey of 3,094 kilometres (1,923 mi) took 80 hours.

The direct Orient Express was withdrawn on 19 May 1977, and the Orient Express via Vienna was cut back, terminating at Budapest and later Vienna. With the opening in 2007 of a new high-speed line from Paris to Strasbourg, the Orient Express was cut again to run only from Strasbourg to Vienna, before finally being entirely withdrawn in 2009 after over 130 years.

This is not to be confused with the Venice-Simplon Orient Express, a luxury tourist train using restored coaches from the 1930s. The VSOE still makes one journey per year to Istanbul, but mostly travels between Calais and Venice.

== Service ==
Between July 2005 and February 2011, the Friendship Express, (an international InterCity train jointly operated by the Turkish State Railways (TCDD) and TrainOSE linking Istanbul and Thessaloniki, Greece) terminated at Sirkeci Railway Station.

Since May 2013 there are currently no international trains from Sirkeci Terminal. For trains to Bulgaria only, suburban trains connect to Halkalı from where a daily train to Sofia with through cars to Bucharest in high season is offered.

Previous	Turkish State Railways	Next
Terminus	Bosphorus Express	Alpullu toward Bucharest
Terminus	Balkans Express	Alpullu toward Belgrade
Terminus	Istanbul-Uzunköprü Regional	Halkalı toward Uzunköprü
Terminus	Istanbul-Kapıkule Regional	Halkalı toward Kapıkule
Terminus	Istanbul-Çerkezköy Regional	Halkalı toward Çerkezköy
Terminus	Istanbul-Halkalı Commuter Line	

== Marmaray station ==
Sirkeci
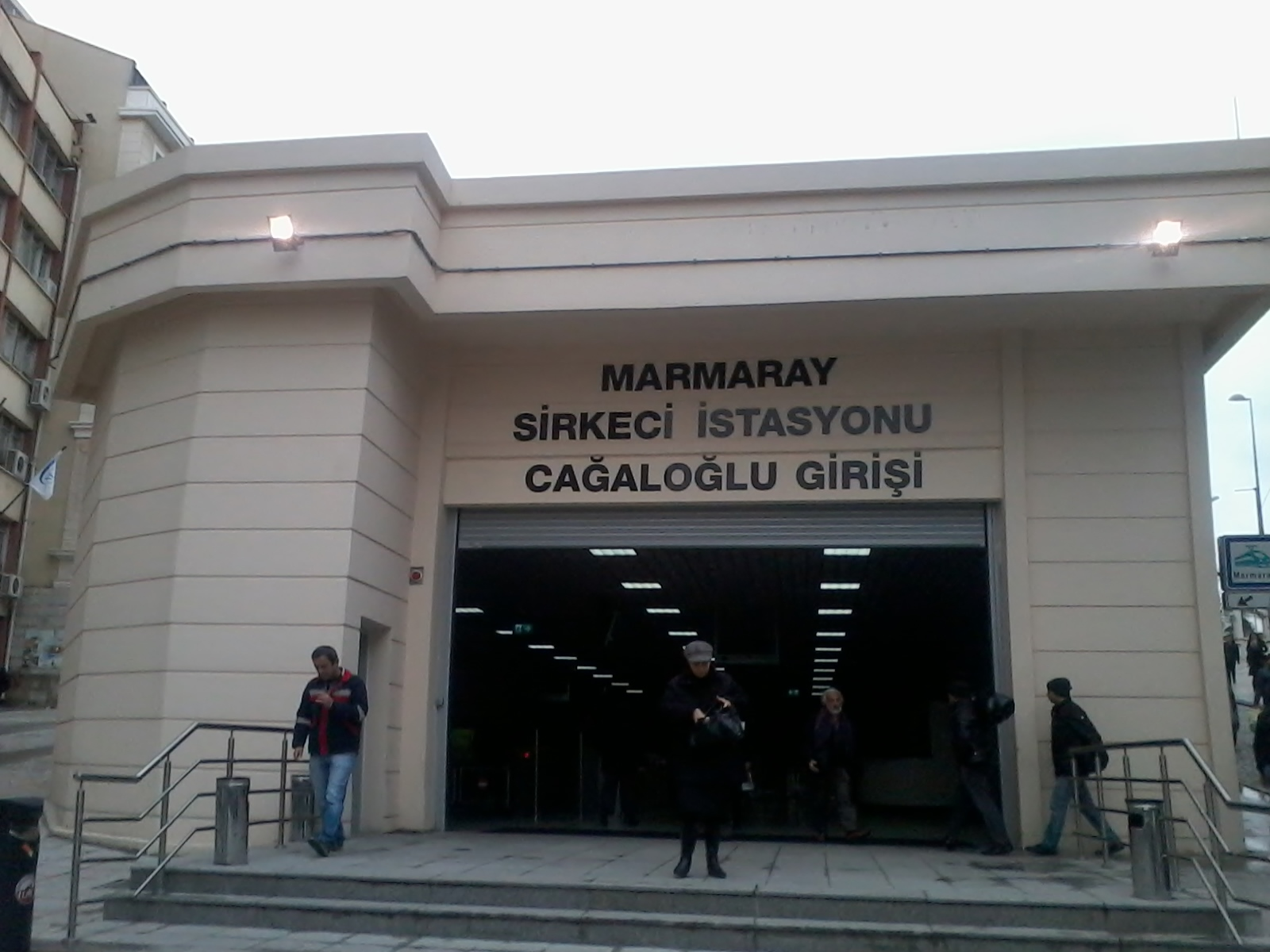
- The Cağaloğlu portal to Sirkeci Marmaray station.

General information
- İETT Bus: 81, BN1, BN2
- System: TCDD Taşımacılık commuter rail station
- Owner: Turkish State Railways
- Line: Marmaray Tunnel
- Platforms: 1 island platform
- Tracks: 2

Construction
- Structure type: Underground
- Accessible: Yes

History
- Opened: 29 October 2013
- Electrified: 25 kV AC

Passengers
- 2017: 24,329 Average daily ridership

Services
Preceding station	TCDD Taşımacılık	Following station
Yenikapı towards Halkalı	Marmaray	Üsküdar towards Gebze
Location

Sirkeci is an underground railway station along the trans-Bosphorus Marmaray tunnel. This underground station was opened on 29 October 2013 along with four other stations (Kazlıçeşme, Yenikapı, Üsküdar and Ayrılık Çeşmesi) on the Marmaray line.

Sirkeci is serviced by TCDD trains running between Kazlıçeşme (west of Sirkeci) and Ayrılık Çeşmesi (east of Sirkeci on the Asian side) with 6- to 10-minute intervals. Once the rehabilitation of the existing rail lines are complete, Marmaray commuter service will run west to Halkalı and east to Gebze. This service is expected to commence in 2016.

Construction of the Marmaray tunnel started in 2004 and was expected to open in April 2009. However, due to several important archaeological discoveries at Yenikapı, the opening was delayed until October 2013.

Sirkeci saw 681,212 boardings in February 2017, making it the fourth busiest station on the Marmaray line. Sirkeci made up 14% of all passenger boardings on the line.

=== Layout ===
Track 1	→ ← Marmaray toward Ataköy or Halkalı
Island platform
Track 2	→ Marmaray toward Maltepe or Gebze →

== Public transport links ==
- Suburban train Sirkeci-Halkalı
- Several bus lines
- Istanbul Modern Tram T1
- Ferryboat Sirkeci-Kabataş
- Sea bus Sirkeci-Bostancı-Adalar
- Car-ferryboat Sirkeci-Harem
- Train-ferryboat Sirkeci Terminal-Haydarpaşa Terminal (not passenger use)
- Nearby Eminönü (200 m distance) has ferries to Kadıköy and Üsküdar
- New Marmaray suburban railway that connects European and Asian Istanbul through a tunnel under the Bosporus.

== See also ==
- Haydarpaşa Terminal, the other major train terminal of Istanbul, on the Asian side
- List of railway stations in Turkey
- Public transport in Istanbul
- Orient Express
- Marmaray, a commuter rail line with a tunnel under the Bosphorus that connects the European railways via Sirkeci to the Asian railways.
