= Marmaray =

Suburban rail line in Istanbul

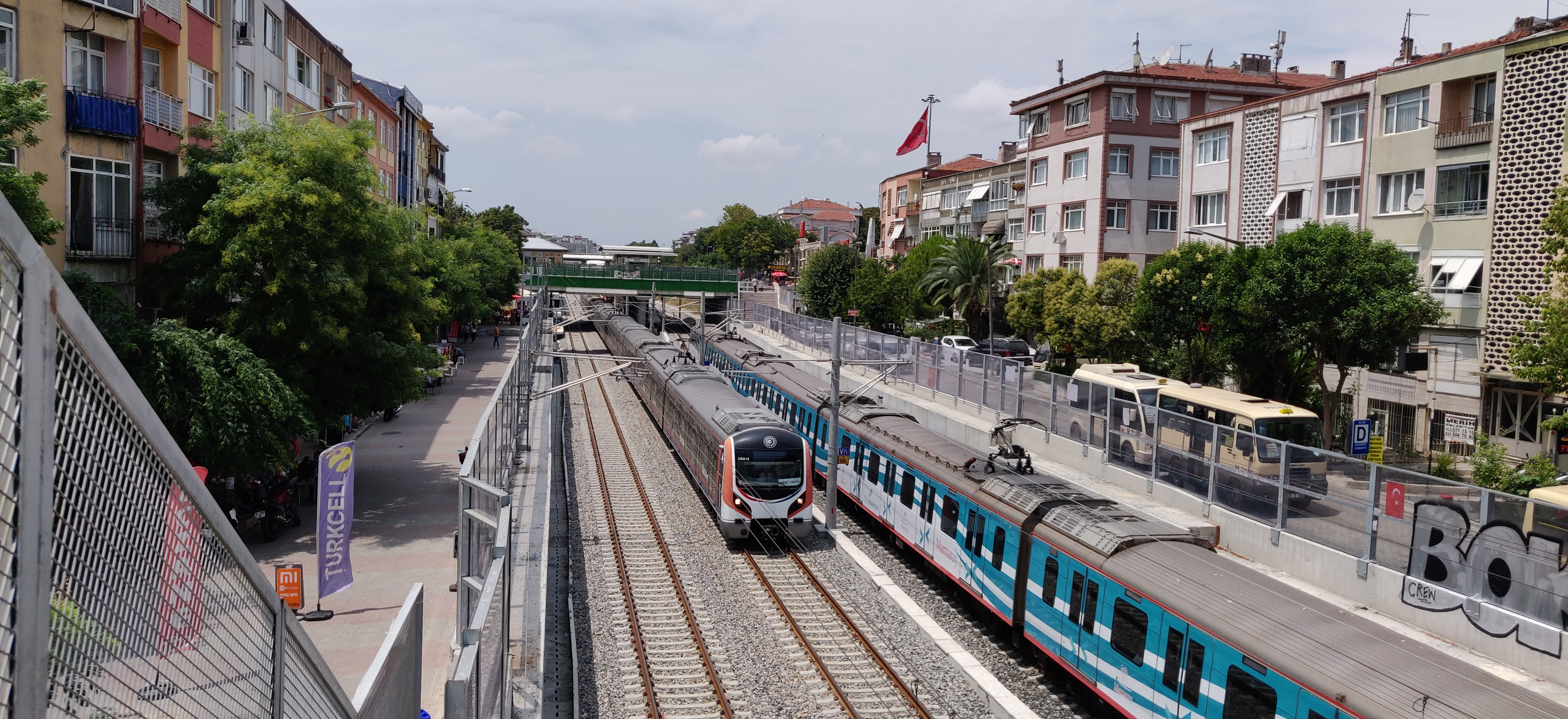
- Two trains meet in Bakırköy.

Overview
- Service type: Commuter rail
- Status: Operating
- Locale: Istanbul
- Predecessor: Istanbul suburban Haydarpaşa suburban
- First service: 29 October 2013; 13 years ago (Kazlıçeşme-Ayrılık Çeşmesi); 12 March 2019; 7 years ago (Halkalı-Gebze)
- Current operator: TCDD Taşımacılık
- Former operator: Turkish State Railways
- Ridership: 124 million (2019)
- Website: www.tcddtasimacilik.gov.tr/marmaray

Route
- Termini: Halkalı; Gebze
- Distance travelled: 76.6 km (47.6 mi)
- Service frequency: 8 minutes (Ataköy – Pendik) 15 minutes (Halkalı – Gebze) Frequency may change during rush hour.

Technical
- Rolling stock: TCDD E32000
- Track gauge: 1,435 mm (4 ft 8 1/2 in) standard gauge
- Electrification: 25 kV, 50 Hz AC Overhead line
- Operating speed: 60–80 km/h (37–50 mph) (average)
- Track owner: Turkish State Railways

Marmaray (pronounced [ˈmaɾmaɾaj]) or B1 (Halkalı – Gebze) Commuter Train is a 77-kilometre-long (48 mi) commuter rail line in Istanbul, Turkey. The line runs from Halkalı, on the European side, to Gebze, on the Asian side, along the north shore of the Sea of Marmara. Mostly using the right-of-way of two existing commuter rail lines, the Marmaray line linked the two lines via a tunnel under the Bosporus strait, becoming the first standard gauge rail connection between Europe and Asia (all prior connections ran through Russia and used the incompatible Russian broad gauge). The two existing sections of the line were rebuilt and expanded from two tracks to three tracks, to allow for higher capacity with intercity and freight rail. The name Marmaray is a portmanteau of the words Marmara, and ray, which means rail in Turkish.

== History ==
Construction started in 2004 and was originally intended to be completed by April 2009. After multiple delays caused – among other things – by the discovery of historical and archaeological sites along the route as new stations were built, the first phase of the project was finally opened by president Erdoğan on 29 October 2013. The second phase of the project was scheduled to open in 2015 but work once again stopped in 2014. It was restarted in February 2017 and the line finally opened in its entirety on 12 March 2019. The trains came with completely new rolling stock, with carriages that can be walked through from end to end.

The line can carry 75,000 passengers per hour in each direction (PPHPD). Travel time from Halkali to Gebze normally takes 104 minutes.

The Marmaray is integrated with other parts of the Istanbul public transport network, including the Metro and the Metrobus network, via a number of interchanges. It is also integrated with the YHT high-speed train network to Ankara, Eskişehir and Konya, as well as with the international trains to Sofia in Bulgaria which depart from Halkalı.

== Project ==
The project involved building a 13.6-kilometre (8.5 mi) tunnel under the Bosphorus and upgrading 63 kilometres (39.1 mi) of existing suburban railway lines to create a 76.6-kilometre (47.6 mi) high-capacity passenger line between Halkalı and Gebze, along with the provision of 440 electric multiple unit carriages.

=== First phase ===
The contract for the project was awarded to a Japanese-Turkish consortium led by Taisei Corporation in July 2004. The consortium included Gama Endustri Tesisleri Imalat ve Montaj and Nurol Construction.

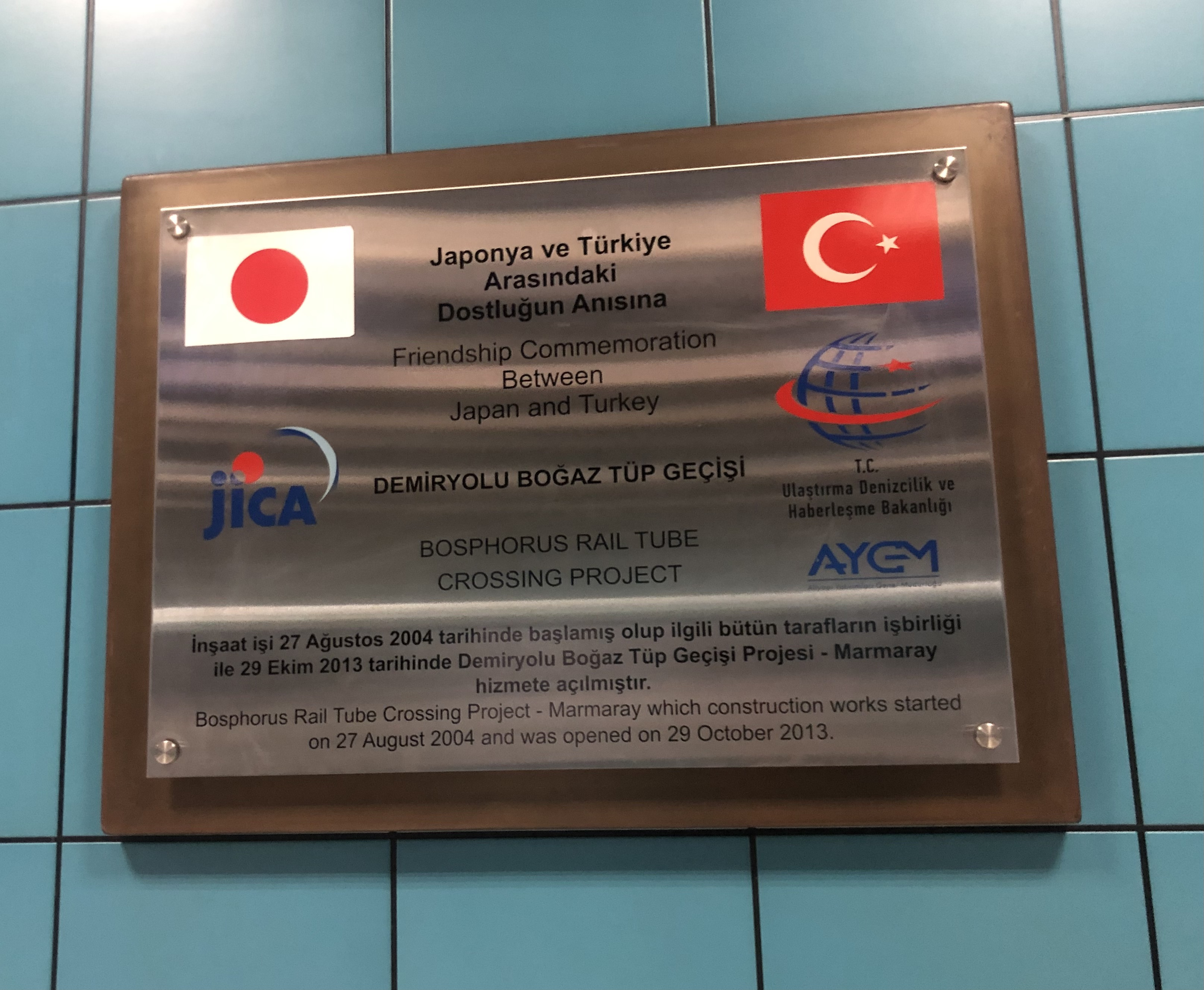
Plaque at the Üsküdar railway station commemorating Japanese-Turkish partnership

The Bosphorus (Istanbul Strait) is crossed by a 1.4-kilometre-long (0.87 mi) earthquake-proofed immersed tube, assembled from 11 sections – eight are 135 metres (443 ft) long, two are 98.5 metres (323 ft), and one element is 110 metres (360 ft). Each section weighs up to 18,000 tons. The tube was placed 60 metres (197 ft) below sea level, beneath 55 metres (180 ft) of water and 4.6 metres (15 ft 1 in) of earth. It is accessed via tunnels bored from Kazlıçeşme on the European side and Ayrılıkçeşmesi on the Asian side of Istanbul and represents the world's deepest undersea immersed tube tunnel. Fire-resistant concrete developed in Norway was essential for the safety of the project.

Construction started in May 2004 and the Marmaray tunnel was completed on 23 September 2008, with a formal ceremony to mark its completion on 13 October.

Path of the rail tunnel project (dotted line) within the Marmaray railway, across the Bosphorus strait

=== Second phase ===
The second phase of the project involved the renewal of the old suburban railway that ran between Halkalı and Kazlıçeşme on the European side of Istanbul and between Ayrılıkçeşmesi and Gebze on the Asian side. The work was meant to be completed at the same time as the first phase (the tunnel and underground sections), but was delayed until March 2019.

A third line was added to enable the electric multiple unit (EMU) cars and other railway carriages to move separately. Thirty-six above-ground stations along the line were rebuilt or completely refurbished. Signalling was also modernised to allow trains to travel as close as two minutes apart (although in reality far fewer trains than that actually run).

The suburban-rail upgrade part of the project, known originally as CR1, was first awarded to the AMD Rail Consortium, comprising Marubeni of Japan, Dogus Insaat of Turkey and Alstom of France. However, they were unable to complete the work and it was re-tendered as contract CR3 in early 2011. The replacement contract worth €932.8 million was awarded to a joint venture between OHL and Invensys Rail.

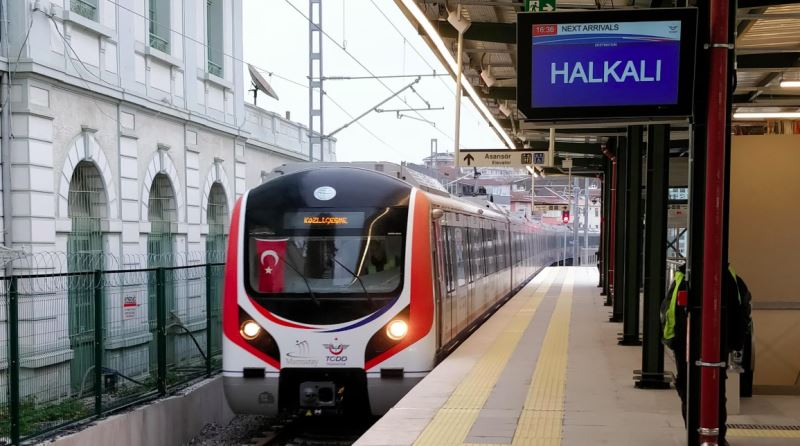
A Marmaray train at Bostancı station on the first day of operation of the Gebze–Halkalı line

=== Freight ===
In February 2010, Railway Gazette International reported that the tunnel's administrators were hiring consultants to analyse options for carrying freight traffic. The Prime Minister and other officials have suggested that the Marmaray will help to create a modern "Iron Silk Road" by allowing freight trains to travel between Europe and China. Freight trains that are not carrying dangerous goods will be able to use the tunnel when commuter services are not operating (between 1:00 a.m. and 5:00 a.m.). At other times only passenger trains will be in the tunnels.

=== Financing ===
The Japan International Cooperation Agency (JICA) and the European Investment Bank (EBI) provided much of the financing for the project. By April 2006, the JICA had lent 111 billion yen and the EIB 1.05 billion euro for the work. The original cost was estimated at $4.5 billion although it finally cost almost twice that.

== Rolling stock ==
The Marmaray uses TCDD E32000 rolling stock manufactured by Hyundai Rotem in ten- and five-car EMU configurations. The original €580 million contract called for 440 vehicles to be produced locally by Eurotem, Hyundai Rotem's joint venture with Turkish rolling stock manufacturer TÜVASAŞ. Hyundai Rotem was chosen ahead of Alstom, CAF, and a consortium of Bombardier, Siemens, and Nurol.

There are two depot and maintenance yards on the line (one at each end) where the sets are stocked.

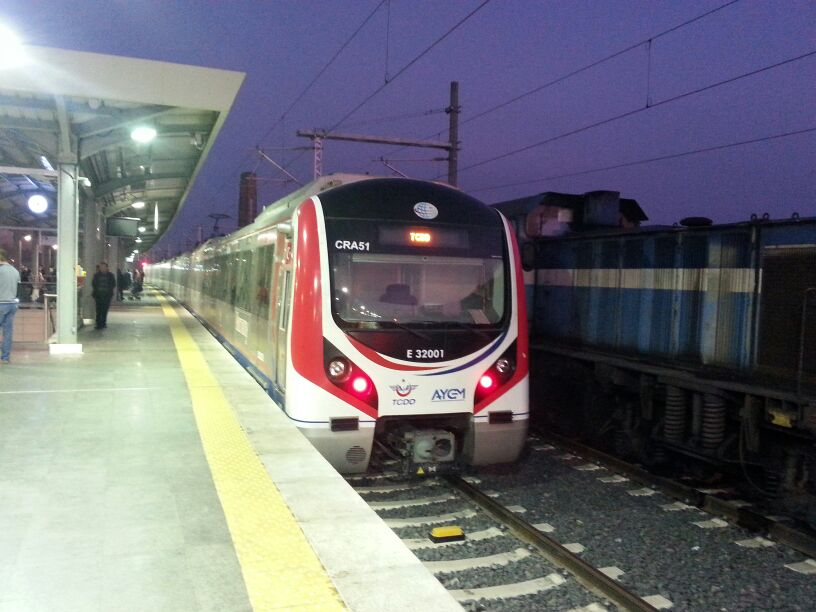
A Marmaray train at Kazlıçeşme

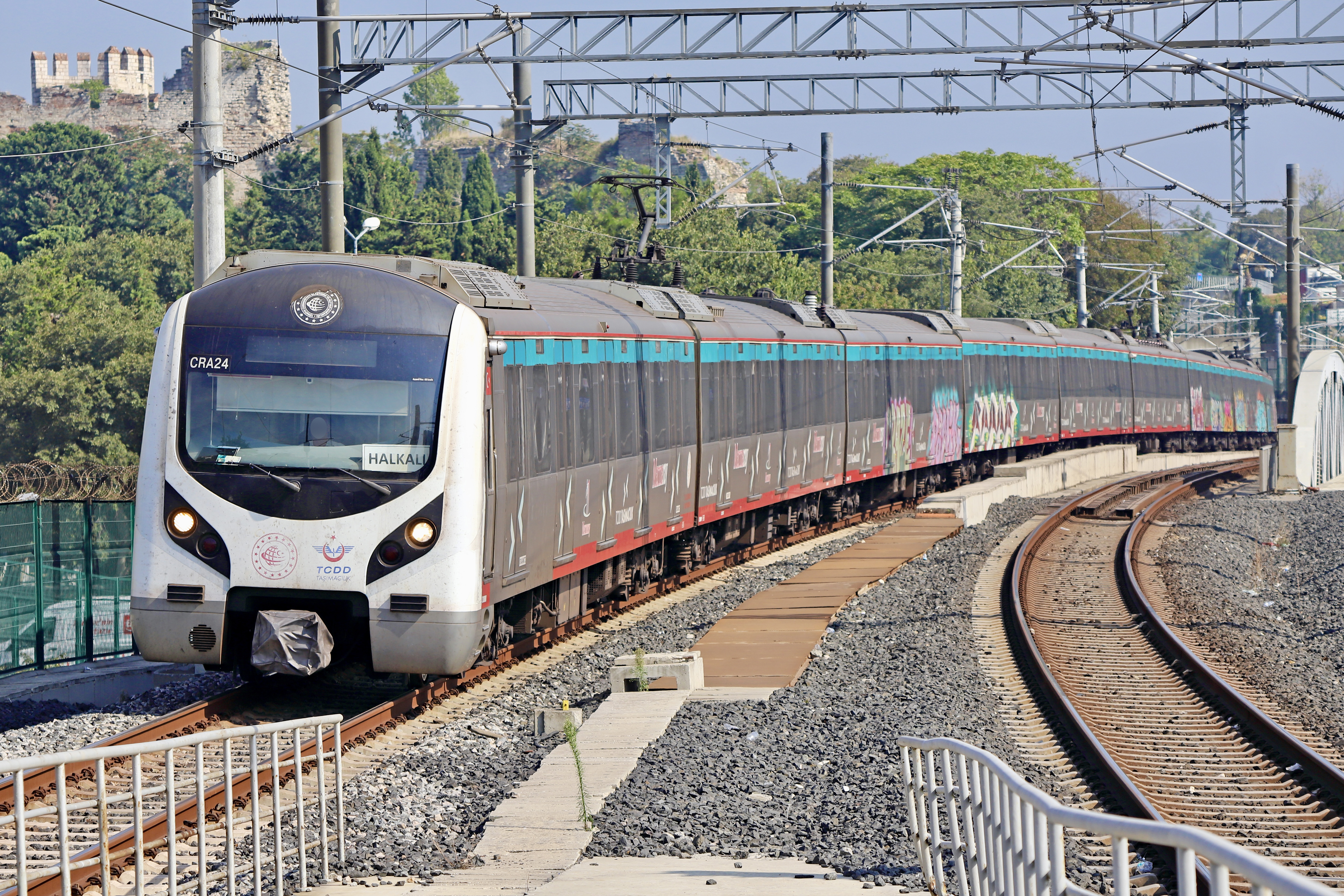
Rolling stock of Marmaray

== Archaeological discoveries during work on the Marmaray ==
The project was delayed by four years, largely due to the discovery of Byzantine-era and other 8,000-year-old archaeological finds on the proposed site of the European tunnel terminal at Yenikapı in 2005. Excavations then produced evidence of the city's largest harbour, the 4th-century Harbour of Eleutherios (originally known as the Harbour of Theodosius). Archaeologists also uncovered traces of the city wall of Constantine the Great, and the remains of several ships, including what appears to be the only ancient or early medieval galley ever discovered, preventing the project from proceeding as planned. In addition, archaeologists uncovered the oldest evidence of settlement in Istanbul, with artefacts, including amphorae, pottery fragments, shells, pieces of bone and horse skulls, and nine human skulls found in a bag, dating back to 6,000 BCE. Glass artefacts and fragments dating from the Hellenistic, Roman, Byzantine and Ottoman periods were also found during excavations at Sirkeci.

== Opening ==
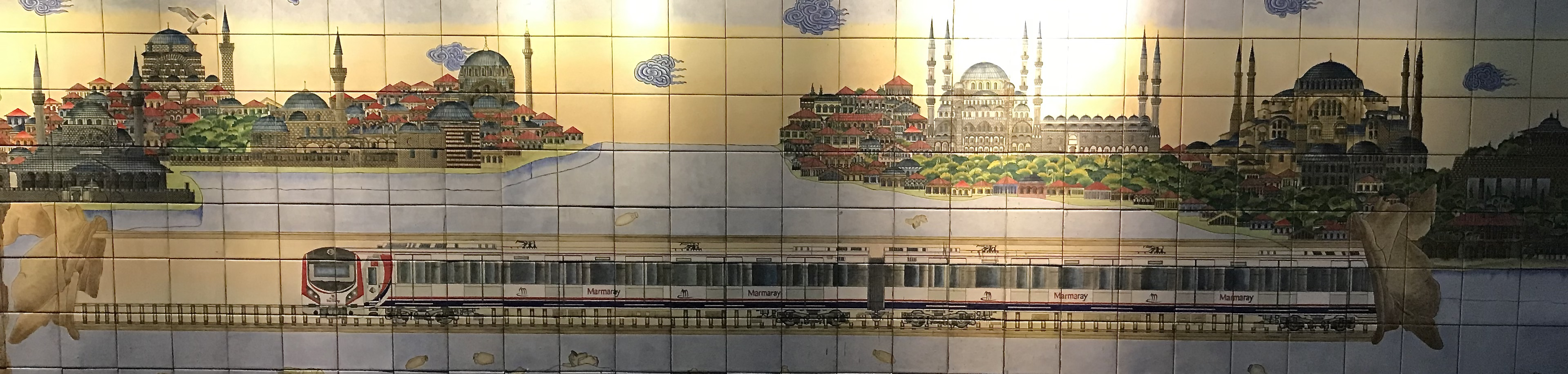
Marmaray train passing under the Bosphorus as depicted in tile in Sirkeci Station

On 4 August 2013, Prime Minister Recep Tayyip Erdoğan, test-drove the Marmaray from Ayrılıkçeşmesi station (originally İbrahimağa station) on the Asian side under the Bosphorus and back again.

On 29 October 2013, the first stage of the Marmaray project, the underground tunnel between Europe and Asia, was inaugurated on the 90th anniversary of the Turkish Republic'. The maiden journey took place after a grand opening ceremony attended by President Abdullah Gül and Prime Minister Erdoğan, as well as by the Japanese Prime Minister Shinzō Abe, the Romanian Prime Minister Victor Ponta, the Somali President Hassan Sheikh Mohamud, and a number of foreign civil servants.

On 7 November 2019, the first Chinese freight train to Europe ran through the tunnel. This demonstrated that the China to Turkey transportation time could be reduced from a month to 12 days as part of the Iron Silk Road concept.

== Earthquake protection ==
The tunnel construction is only about 18 kilometres (11 mi) away from the active North Anatolian Fault and has worried some engineers and seismologists. "Since AD 342, it has seen large earthquakes that each claimed more than 10,000 lives." Some scientists have estimated a 77% probability that, at some time in the next 30 years, Istanbul will suffer an earthquake measuring 7.0 or more on the Richter magnitude scale. The waterlogged, silty soil on which the tunnel is constructed has been known to liquefy during an earthquake so engineers injected industrial grout to 24 metres (79 ft) below the seabed to keep it stable. The walls of the tunnel are made of waterproof concrete coated with a steel shell, each section independently watertight. The tunnel is made to flex and bend in the way that tall buildings are constructed to react if an earthquake hits. Floodgates at the joints of the tunnel are able to close and isolate water in the event of the walls failing.

Steen Lykke, project manager for Avrasyaconsult, the international consortium that oversaw the construction, summed the problems up by saying, "I can't think of any challenge this project lacks".

== Marmaray in numbers ==
Some figures of the project are as follows:

- Overall length: 76.6 km (47.6 mi)
- Tunnel section: 13.6 km (8.5 mi)
- Immersed tube: 1,387 m (4,551 ft)
- Deepest point: 60.46 m (198.4 ft)
- Minimum curve radius: 300 m (980 ft)
- Maximum gradient: 1.8%
- Surface stations: 37
- Underground stations: 3
- Interchanges: 8
- Inter-city stations: 8
- Minimum platform length: 225 m (738 ft)
- Average station spacing: 1.9 km (1.2 mi)
- Maximum speed: 100 km/h (62 mph)
- Commercial speed: 45 km/h (28 mph)
- Headway: 2–10 minutes
- Passengers per hour and direction: 75,000
- Number of passenger cars: 440

== See also ==
- Eurasia Tunnel
- Great Istanbul Tunnel, a proposed three-level road-rail undersea tunnel
- Public transport in Istanbul
- Rail transport in Turkey
- Turkish Straits
