= List of ferry quays in Istanbul =

There are 50 passenger ferry quays in Istanbul, the largest city in Turkey with a population of 16,237,000 in 2025. 37 of the ferry quays are in active service in Bosphorus, Golden Horn and the Sea of Marmara. As of the 2017 Summer season, the ferry quays are served at 600 voyages daily by 28 traditional passenger ferry boats on 17 lines operated by the Şehir Hatları ("City Lines") company.

== Quays ==
The following shows a list of active ferry quays.

Interactive map: Interactive map of all ferry quays in Istanbul
Name	Image	Location
Anadoluhisarı		Bosphoros (Anatolian side)
Anadolukavağı	Anadolu Kavağı	Bosphoros (Anatolian side)
Arnavutköy	Arnavutköy	Bosphorous (Rumeli side)
Ayvansaray	Ayvansaray	Golden Horn (West side)
Balat		Golden Horn (West side)
Barbaros Hayrettin Paşa	Barbaros Hayrettin Paşa	Bosphorous (Rumeli side)
Bebek	Bebek	Bosphorous (Rumeli side)
Beşiktaş		Bosphorous (Rumeli side)
Beykoz	Beykoz	Bosphoros (Anatolian side)
Beylerbeyi	Beylerbeyi	Bosphoros (Anatolian side)
Bostancı	Bostancı	Anatolia
Burgazada		Adalar (Prince Islands)
Büyükada	Büyükada	Adalar (Prince Islands)
Büyükdere		Bosphoros (Rumeli side)
Çengelköy	Çengelköy	Bosphoros (Anatolian side)
Çubuklu		Bosphoros (Anatolian side)
Eminönü	Eminönü	Bosphorous (Rumeli side)
Emirgân	Emirgan	Bosphorous (Rumeli side)
Eyüp	Eyüp	Golden Horn (West side)
Fener	Fener	Golden horn (West side)
Hasköy		Golden horn (East side)
Heybeliada		Adalar (Prince Islands)
İstinye		Bosphorous (Rumeli side)
Kabataş		Bosphorous (Rumeli side)
Kadıköy	Kadıköy	Bosphoros (Anatolian side)
Kandilli	Kandilli	Bosphoros (Anatolian side)
Kanlıca	Kanlıca	Bosphoros (Anatolian side)
Karaköy	Karaköy	Bosphorous (Rumeli side)
Kasımpaşa	Kasımpaşa	Golden horn (East side)
Kınalıada		Adalar (Prince Islands)
Kuzguncuk		Bosphoros (Anatolian side)
Küçüksu		Bosphoros (Anatolian side)
Ortaköy	Ortaköy	Bosphorous (Rumeli side)
Paşabahçe		Bosphoros (Anatolian side)
Poyraz		Bosphorus (Anatolian side)
Rumelikavağı		Bosphorous (Rumeli side)
Sarıyer		Bosphorous (Rumeli side)
Sedefadası		Adalar (Prince Islands)
Sütlüce	Sütlüce	Golden horn (East side)
Üsküdar	Üsküdar	Bosphoros (Anatolian side)

== See also ==
- Ferries in Istanbul
- Public transport in Istanbul
