= Karaköy Pier =

Ferry pier in Istanbul, Turkey

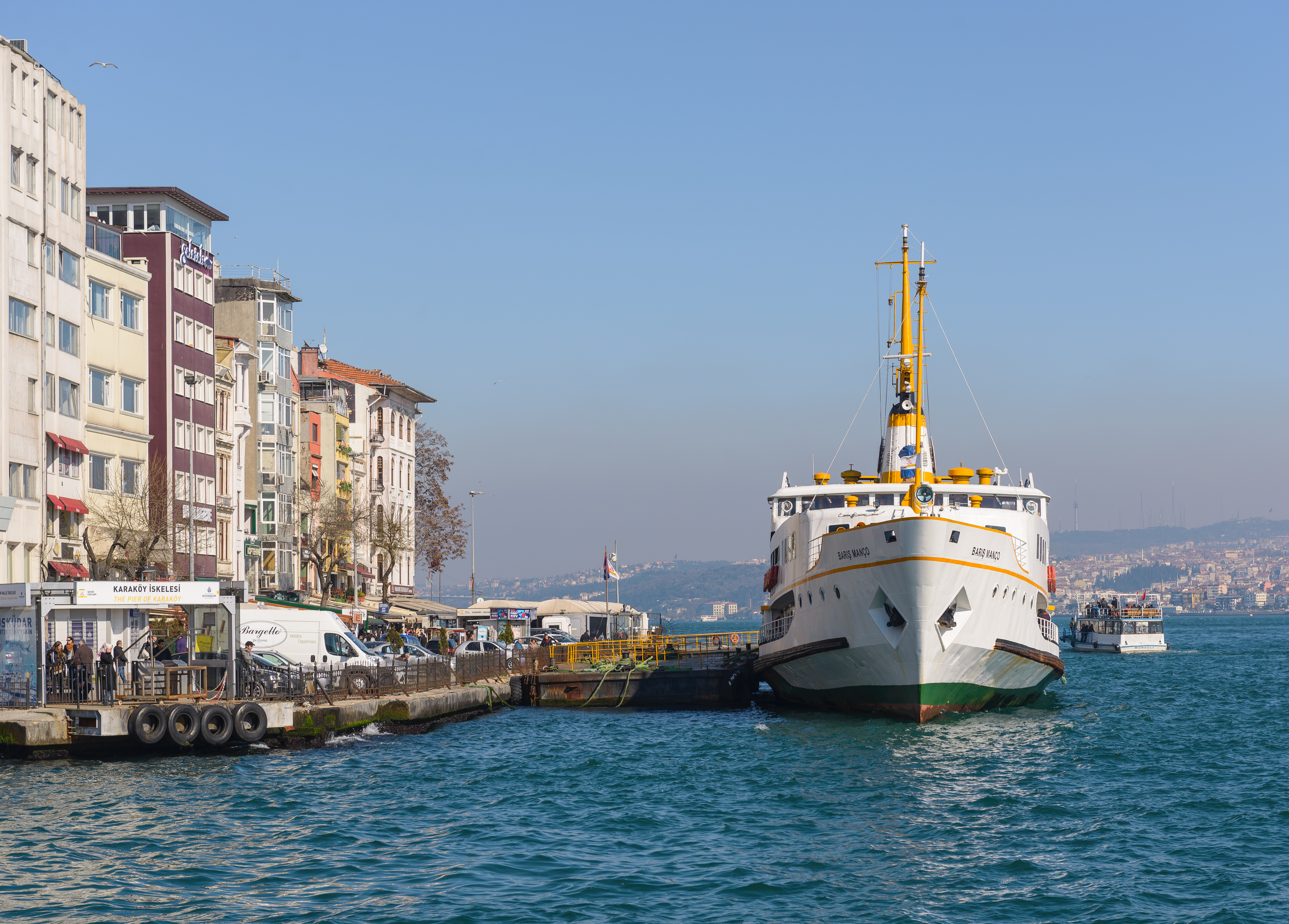
- The MS Barış Manço docked at Karaköy in 2013

General information
- Location: Rıhtım Cd., Kemankeş Karamustafa Paşa Mah., 34425; Beyoğlu, Istanbul; Turkey
- Coordinates: 41.0217°N 28.9767°E
- Operator: Şehir Hatları
- Lines: Golden Horn Line; Karaköy-Kadıköy; Bostancı-Karaköy
- Connections: Tünel at Karaköy; Istanbul Tram at Karaköy; Turyol at Karaköy; İETT Bus: 26, 26A, 26B, 28, 28T, 30D, 31E, 32, 33, 33B, 33ES, 33TE, 33Y, 35, 36CE, 36KE, 37E, 38E, 44B, 46Ç, 47, 47Ç, 47E, 47N, 48E, 54E, 54TE, 66, 70D, 70FE, 70KE, 74, 74A, 77Ç, 78, 78H, 79E, 80, 82, 90, 91O, 92, 92A, 92C, 93, 94, 97A, 97GE, 99, 99A, 99Y, 146B, 336E, EM1, EM2

Construction
- Accessible: Yes

History
- Opened: 1959
- Rebuilt: 1966, 1984, 2008

Services
Preceding station	Şehir Hatları	Following station
Kasımpaşa towards Eyüp	Golden Horn Line	Üsküdar Terminus
Terminus	Karaköy-Kadıköy	Kadıköy Terminus
Terminus	Bostancı-Karaköy	Bostancı Terminus
Location
- Location within Istanbul

Karaköy Pier (Turkish: Karaköy iskelesi) is a ferry landing on the Golden Horn in Beyoğlu, Istanbul. Located along Rıhtım Avenue, just east of the Galata Bridge, Şehir Hatları operates many ferries from Karaköy to Kadıköy, Bostancı, Üsküdar and to piers along the Golden Horn, as far west as Eyüp.

Karaköy pier first opened in 1959, replacing an older pier on the Galata Bridge, and has been rebuilt three times since. It is located on the southern shore of the historic Galata neighborhood, known today as Karaköy. Connections to the historic Tünel funicular railway, Istanbul Tram and IETT city bus service is available, as well as connection to private Turyol ferry service at the nearby Turyol pier on the west side of the Galata Bridge.

== History ==
Ferry service from the Galata-Eminönü area to Kadıköy began in the mid-19th century from Eminönü Pier, on the southern shore of the Golden Horn. It wasn't until 1919 that a pier was opened on the Galata side of the inlet. This pier was built along the Galata Bridge and kept operating until 16 January 1959, when a storm destroyed the pier.

The pier was rebuilt within the same year, but moved to a new location 160 m (520 ft) east of the bridge to its current location. This pier extended outwards on the water and was used for ferries primarily to Kadıköy. On 1 March 1966, two Soviet-flagged vessels, the M/T Lutsk and the M/T Kransky Oktiabr, collided near the Maiden's Tower causing 1,850 tons of oil to be spilled into the Bosporus. The oil caught fire and reached Karaköy, where it burned down the Karaköy Pier along with the MS Kadıköy. The pier was rebuilt shortly after and remained in operation until 1984, when a newer floating pier replaced it. This pier kept operating until 2008, when another Lodos storm sank the pier. This pier was replaced with a smaller one, located on land and connected to a small floating barge. That pier was finally replaced in 2018 with a much larger pier, built just off-shore and equipped with a library and cafe upstairs.
