= Üsküdar railway station =

Train stop in eastern Istanbul

Üsküdar
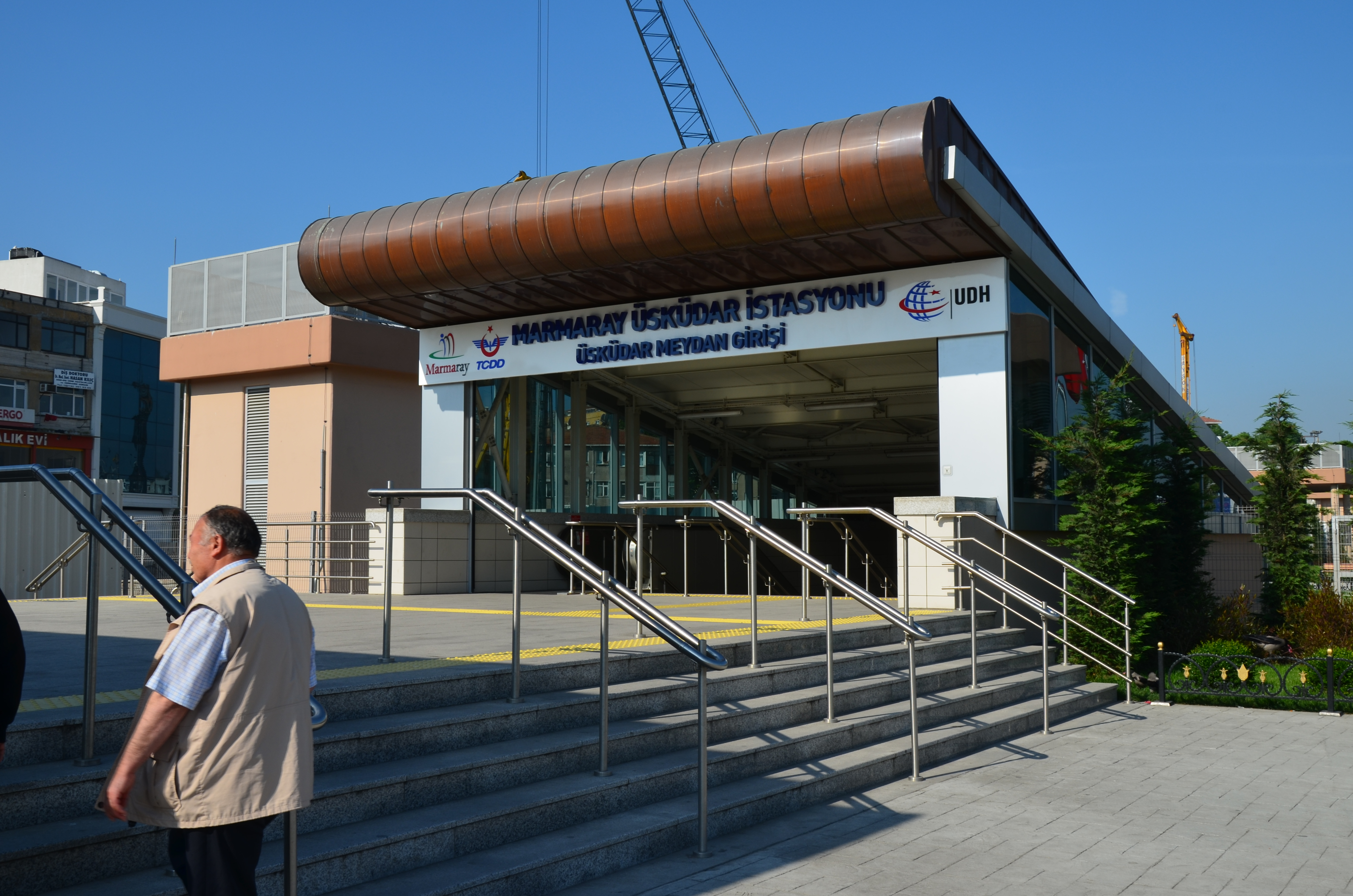
- The Üsküdar square portal to the station.

General information
- Location: Üsküdar Meydanı, Mimar Sinan Mah., 34672; Üsküdar, Istanbul; Turkey
- Coordinates: 41.025611°N 29.014972°E
- System: TCDD Taşımacılık commuter rail station
- Owner: Turkish State Railways
- Operator: TCDD Taşımacılık
- Line: Marmaray Tunnel
- Platforms: 1 island platform
- Tracks: 2
- Connections: Istanbul Metro: at Üsküdar; Şehir Hatları at Üsküdar Terminal; Turyol at Üsküdar Pier; Dentur at Üsküdar Terminal; İETT Bus: 15, 15B, 15C, 15E, 15H, 15K, 15KÇ, 15M, 15N, 15P, 15R, 15S, 15T, 15Y, 15ŞN, 15Z; Istanbul Minibus: Üsküdar-Acıbadem

Construction
- Structure type: Underground
- Accessible: Yes

History
- Opened: 29 October 2013
- Electrified: 25 kV AC, 50 Hz Overhead wire

Passengers
- 2017: 35,786 Average daily ridership

Services
Preceding station	TCDD Taşımacılık	Following station
Sirkeci towards Halkalı	Marmaray	Ayrılık Çeşmesi towards Gebze
Location

Üsküdar railway station is an underground railway station located beneath Üsküdar square in Istanbul. It was opened on 29 October 2013 along with the new trans-Bosphorus Marmaray rail tunnel. TCDD Taşımacılık operates commuter trains east to Ayrılık Çeşmesi and west to Kazlıçeşme (on the European side) within 6- to 10-minute intervals. Due to the stations central location, connections to several city bus routes are available.

Üsküdar saw over 1.1 million boardings in October 2017, making it the 3rd busiest station on the Marmaray line as well as making up for 20% of all passenger boardings.

== Layout ==
Track 1	→ ← Marmaray toward Zeytinburnu or Halkalı
Island platform
Track 2	→ Marmaray toward Maltepe or Gebze →
