= Üsküdar Ferry Terminal =

Ferry terminal in Üsküdar, Istanbul

Üsküdar Pier
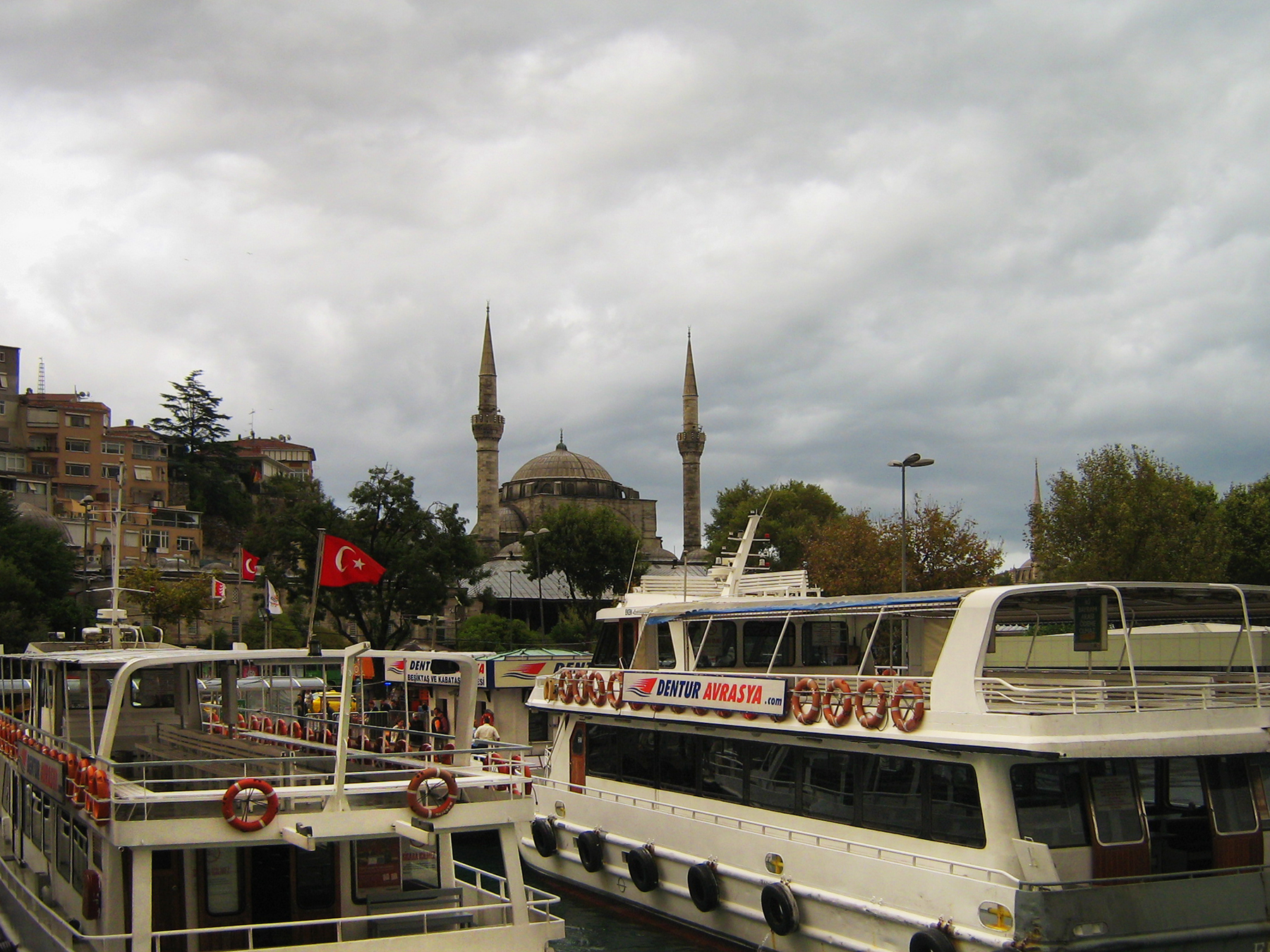
- Private Dentur ferries docked at Üsküdar.

General information
- Location: Paşa Limanı Cd., Mimar Sinan Mah., 34664; Üsküdar, Istanbul; Turkey
- Coordinates: 41.0276°N 29.0152°E
- Operator: Şehir Hatları, Dentur
- Lines: Bosporus Line; Golden Horn Line; Üsküdar-Eminönü; Üsküdar-Ortaköy; Üsküdar-A. Kavağı
- Connections: Istanbul Metro at Üsküdar; TCDD Taşımacılık at Üsküdar; Turyol at Üsküdar; İETT Bus: 15, 15B, 15C, 15E, 15H, 15K, 15KÇ, 15M, 15N, 15P, 15R, 15S, 15T, 15Y, 15ŞN, 15Z; Istanbul Minibus: Üsküdar-Acıbadem

Construction
- Accessible: Yes

History
- Opened: 1853
- Rebuilt: 1906, 1965

Services
Preceding station	Şehir Hatları	Following station
Eminönü Terminus	Üsküdar-Eminönü	Terminus
Karaköy towards Eyüp	Golden Horn Line	Terminus
Terminus	Bosporus Line	Kuzguncuk towards Beykoz
Terminus	Üsküdar-Ortaköy	Ortaköy Terminus
Terminus	Üsküdar-A. Kavaği	Beylerbeyi towards A. Kavağı
Preceding station	Dentur	Following station
Beşiktaş Terminus	Üsküdar-Beşiktaş	Terminus
Kabataş Terminus	Üsküdar-Kabataş	Terminus
Location
- Location within Istanbul

The Üsküdar Ferry Terminal, also known as the Üsküdar Pier (Turkish: Üsküdar İskelesi), is a ferry terminal in Üsküdar, Istanbul, located along Paşa Limanı Avenue on the Bosporus strait. It is used by Municipal Şehir Hatları (City Lines) ferries as well as private Dentur ferries. Şehir Hatları ferries operate to several piers along the Bosporus and Golden Horn, while Dentur operates frequent ferry service to Kabataş and Beşiktaş.

The first Üsküdar Pier was built in 1852 and is notable as the first public ferry landing built on the Bosporus strait. The modern terminal was built in 1965. Üsküdar Terminal is located near Üsküdar Square in central Üsküdar, from which connections to bus, train and metro service are available. Another private ferry operator, Turyol, operates ferry service from its pier just north of Üsküdar terminal.

== History ==
Üsküdar Pier was first opened in 1853 by an Ottoman ferry company, Şirket-i Hayriye as the companies first ferry pier on the Bosporus strait. The first pier was located slightly inland, near the Fountain of Ahmed III. The first ferry service from Üsküdar operated to Kabataş, on the European shore of the Bosporus. As Üsküdar grew in the late 19th century, ferry service also increased and the existing pier was not large enough to handle the capacity. In 1905, Şirket-i Hayriye began operating ferry service from Beşiktaş to Haydarpaşa station, via Üsküdar. Passengers used this route to connect to railway service east into Anatolia. In 1906, the first pier was demolished and replaced by a larger pier. The inside of the pier consisted of decorative tiles, with ticket counters and bird cages.

Şirket-i Hayriye was bought by the state-owned Şehir Hatları municipal ferry company in 1945. In the 1950s, the popularity of ferries grew along with passenger ridership. To increase capacity, a larger terminal was built in 1965 and remains in operation to this day.

== Services ==
Üsküdar is a main pier for the municipal ferry service. Şehir Hatları operates ferries to 20 other piers on the Bosporus and Golden Horn, while Dentur operates to two other piers. Among these destinations are Beşiktaş, Kabataş, Eminönü, Karaköy and Kadıköy. Ferries leave Üsküdar at an average of 10 minute intervals, making it one of the busiest ferry terminals in Turkey.
