= Sütlüce Pier =

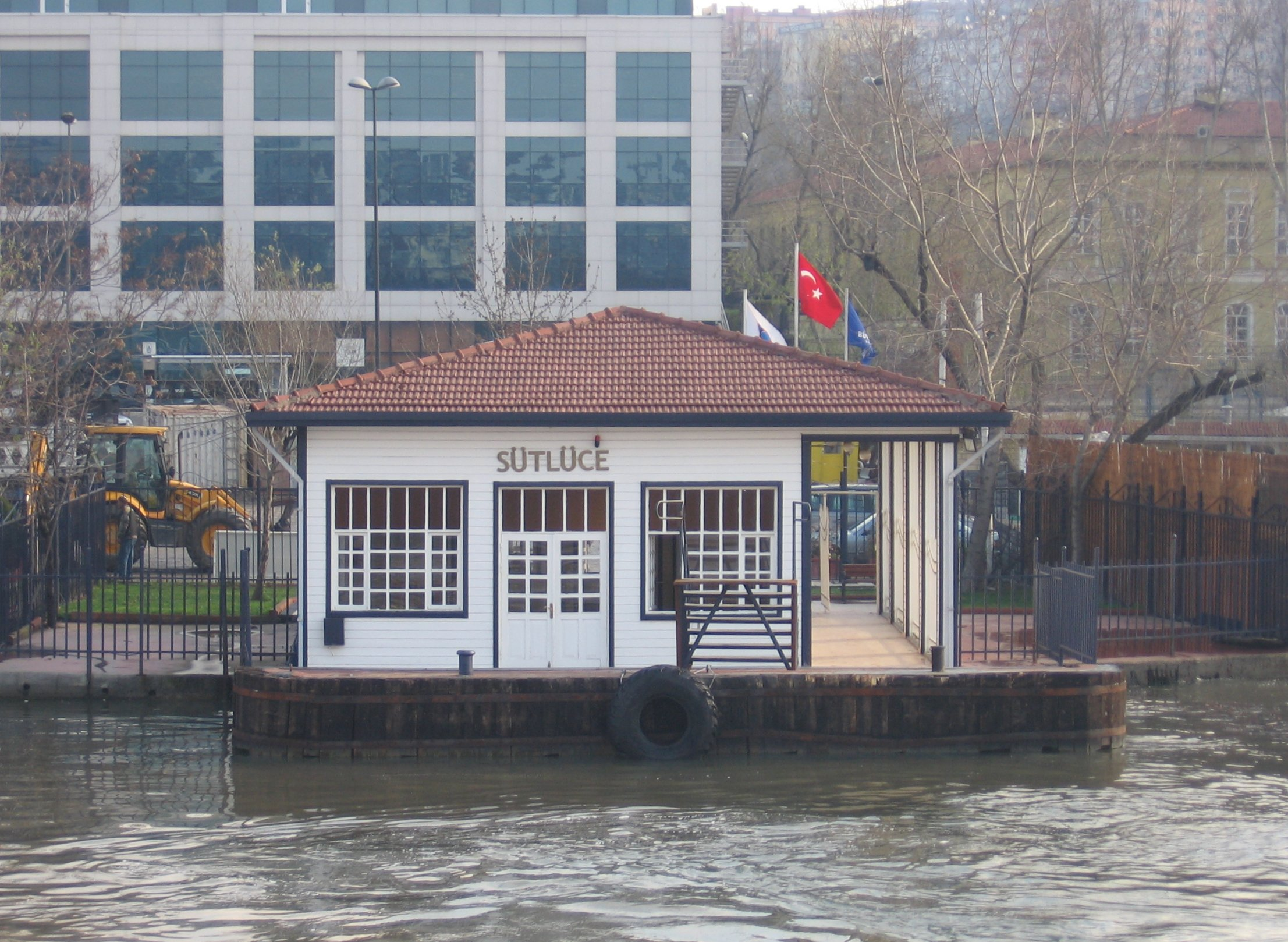
- The pier house

General information
- Location: Karaağaç Cd., Sütlüce Mah., 34445; Beyoğlu, Istanbul; Turkey
- Coordinates: 41.0466°N 28.9407°E
- Operator: Şehir Hatları
- Line: Golden Horn Line
- Connections: İETT Bus: 36T, 38T, 41ST, 47, 47E, 47N, 54HŞ

Construction
- Accessible: Yes

History
- Rebuilt: 1989

Services
Preceding station	Şehir Hatları	Following station
Eyüp Terminus	Golden Horn Line	Ayvansaray towards Üsküdar
Location
- Location within Istanbul

Sütlüce Pier (Turkish: Sütlüce İskelesi) is a ferry slip on the Golden Horn in Beyoğlu, Istanbul. The Municipal ferry operator, Şehir Hatları, operates hourly ferry service from Eyüp to Üsküdar, stopping at Sütlüce and six other piers on the Golden Horn. This route is known as the Golden Horn Line.

It is unclear when Sütlüce Pier was built, although public ferry service has been operating since the mid 19th century. The pier was rebuilt in 1989.
