= Bostancı =

- Neighbourhood
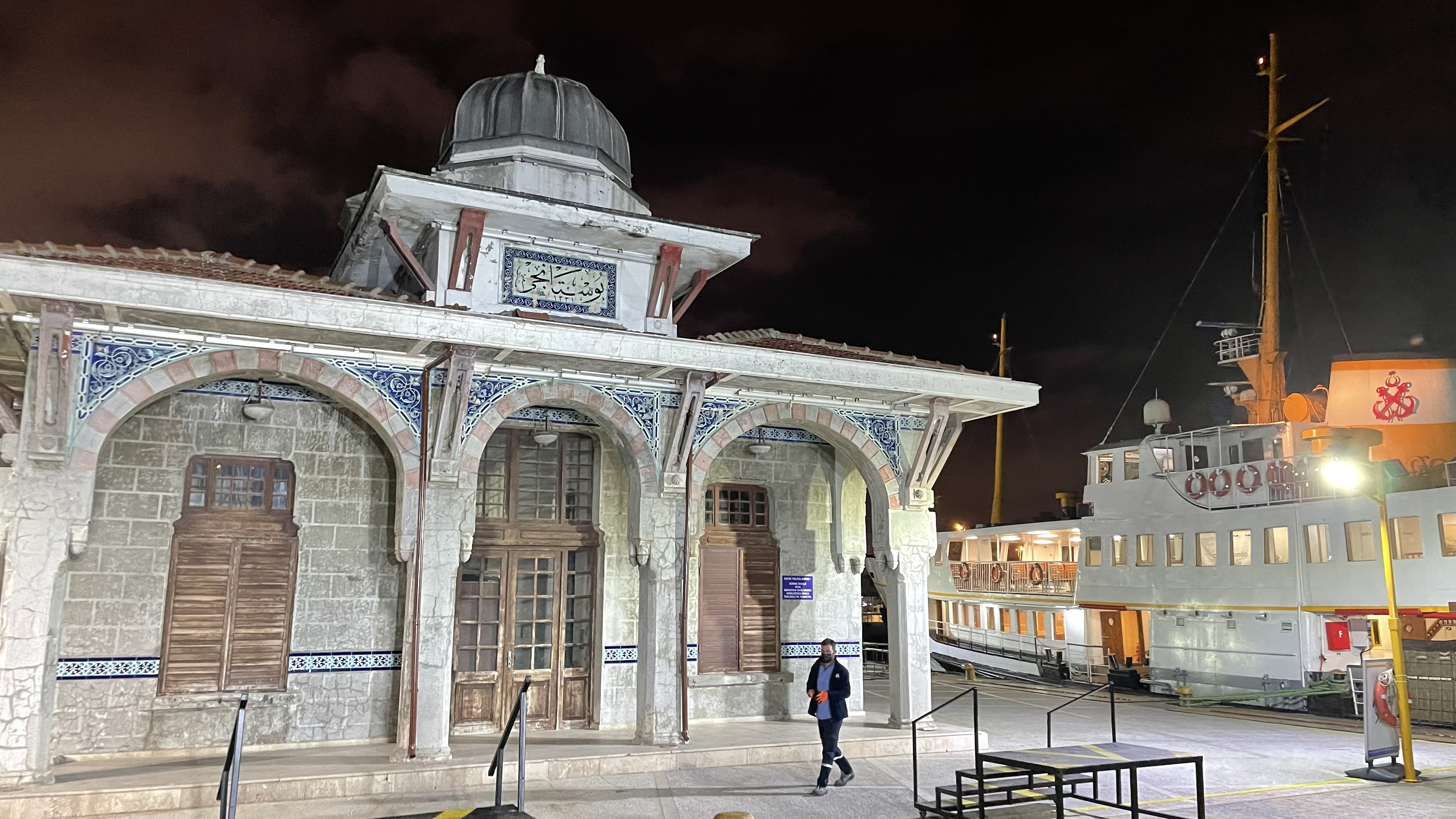
- Bostancı pier

- Bostancı inside Kadıköy

- Location within Turkey Location within Istanbul
- Coordinates: 40°57′30″N 29°05′44″E
- Country: Turkey
- Province: Istanbul
- District: Kadıköy
- Population (2022): 33,638
- Time zone: UTC+3 (TRT)

Bostancı (Turkish: [bosˈtandʒɯ]) is a neighborhood in the municipality and district of Kadıköy, Istanbul Province, Turkey, on the shore of the Sea of Marmara. As the easternmost neighborhood of the Kadıköy district; it borders Suadiye and Kozyatağı (also neighborhoods of Kadıköy) to the west, İçerenköy (a neighborhood of Ataşehir) to the north, and Altıntepe (a neighborhood of Maltepe) to the east. The population of Bostancı is 33,638 (2022).

A predominantly residential area, Bostancı is an important transport interchange with stops on the Marmaray, M8 Metro and M4 Metro lines and ferries leaving for the Princes' Islands in the Sea of Marmara. It is generally considered the starting point of Bağdat Avenue, the major shopping street that runs as far as Kadıköy.

Because of its position on the water, Bostancı has several fish restaurants. It is also popular as a place to stop off for late night fast food. Several places stay open all night serving people returning from the bars and clubs on Bağdat Avenue.

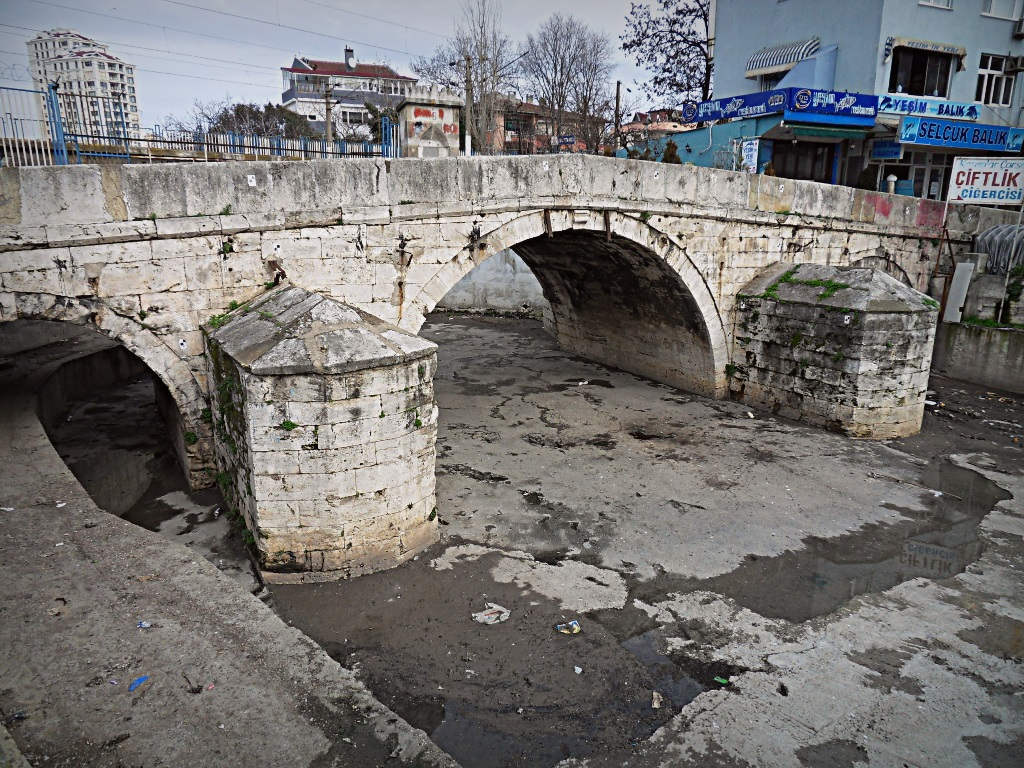
Bostancıbaşı Bridge: the stream it once crossed is now dried up

== History ==
In the Byzantine period, Bostancı was probably called Poleatikon. Poleatikon was one of the places where the ceremonial reception of an emperor returning from a military campaign or journey in Anatolia could take place. There was a church around where the Bostancı train station is now and a port at the Bostancı or Çamaşırcı Stream.

When the Umayyad forces besieged Constantinople (now Istanbul) in 718, their navy took refuge in the port here.

During the Ottoman period, the main road connecting the Istanbul to Anatolia passed through Bostancı, which was the eastern border of the city. A bostancı outpost (bostancı derbendi) was established at the Bostancıbaşı Bridge to control entrance to the city, the bostancıbaşı (Turkish: bostancı, "gardener," baş, "head") being the official responsible for security and maintenance, first for Istanbul palaces and gardens, and later for other imperial palaces and fields. The neighborhood received its name from the Bostancı Guild (ocak) stationed at the bridge.

Until the mid-19th century, Bostancı and other neighborhoods along the Marmara shore were known for bağ and bostan (vineyards and vegetable gardens), providing fruits and vegetables to the city of Istanbul. The population of the area consisted mostly of gardeners and fishers.

With the development of the Anatolian Railway in the 1870s, upper-class Muslims, Ottoman minorities, and foreigners began building summer houses along the line, including in Bostancı, and the neighborhoods along the line gradually became less rural and more suburban. For Bostancı, one of the most significant of these summer houses was the mansion (köşk) of Sadi Bey, an accountant in the Ministry of Public Works. A train station was built in 1910 (the previous station may have been in an officer's house built in 1874). A wooden steamboat pier was built in 1888 and a ferry station in 1912-13. A mosque and primary school were built in 1913. The area of Bostancı west of Bostancı Stream was established as a mahalle in 1914, while the area east of the stream continued to be part of the kaza of Kartal.

== Historic sites ==
Historic sites of Bostancı include

- the Bostancıbaşı or Bostancı Bridge, an Ottoman bridge, possibly built in 1523-24
- the ruins of a Jesuit monastery, possibly from the 16th century
- the Bostancı Community Education Center Building, built as a school (mekteb) in 1778 by Abdülhamid I, heavily restored by the architect Kemaleddin in 1915
- the Mahmud II Fountain (çeşme) or Bostancıbaşı Outpost (derbend) Fountain, built in 1831
- the qibla stone for the open-air prayer place (namazgâh) of the Bostancıbaşı Outpost
- the Cavit Paşa Mansion (köşk), built by Mirliva Cavit Paşa in the late 19th or early 20th century, bought by Tahsin Coşkan in 1932, restored in 2016
- the Tamara Mansion (köşk), built in 1903 by Edouard Huguenin of the Anatolian Baghdad Railways on the grounds of the ruined Jesuit Monastery
- the train station, built in 1910, rebuilt in 2019 as part of the Marmaray project
- the steamboat pier, built in 1912-13, restored in 1978 and 2006
- the Bostancı or Kuloğlu or Station Mosque, designed by the architect Kemaleddin, built in 1913, enlarged in 1969 and 1990
- Bostancı Show Center

== Transport ==
From Bostancı, five of the Princes' Islands - Kınalıada, Burgazada, Heybeliada, Büyükada, and Sivriada - can be seen. Bostancı is also an important interchange for the Asian side of Istanbul with copious city buses, sea buses, commuter ferries, trains and dolmuşes. All intercity trains heading for Anatolia stop at Bostancı railway station, which is opposite the Bostancı pier.

Bus system

- 2 Balaban
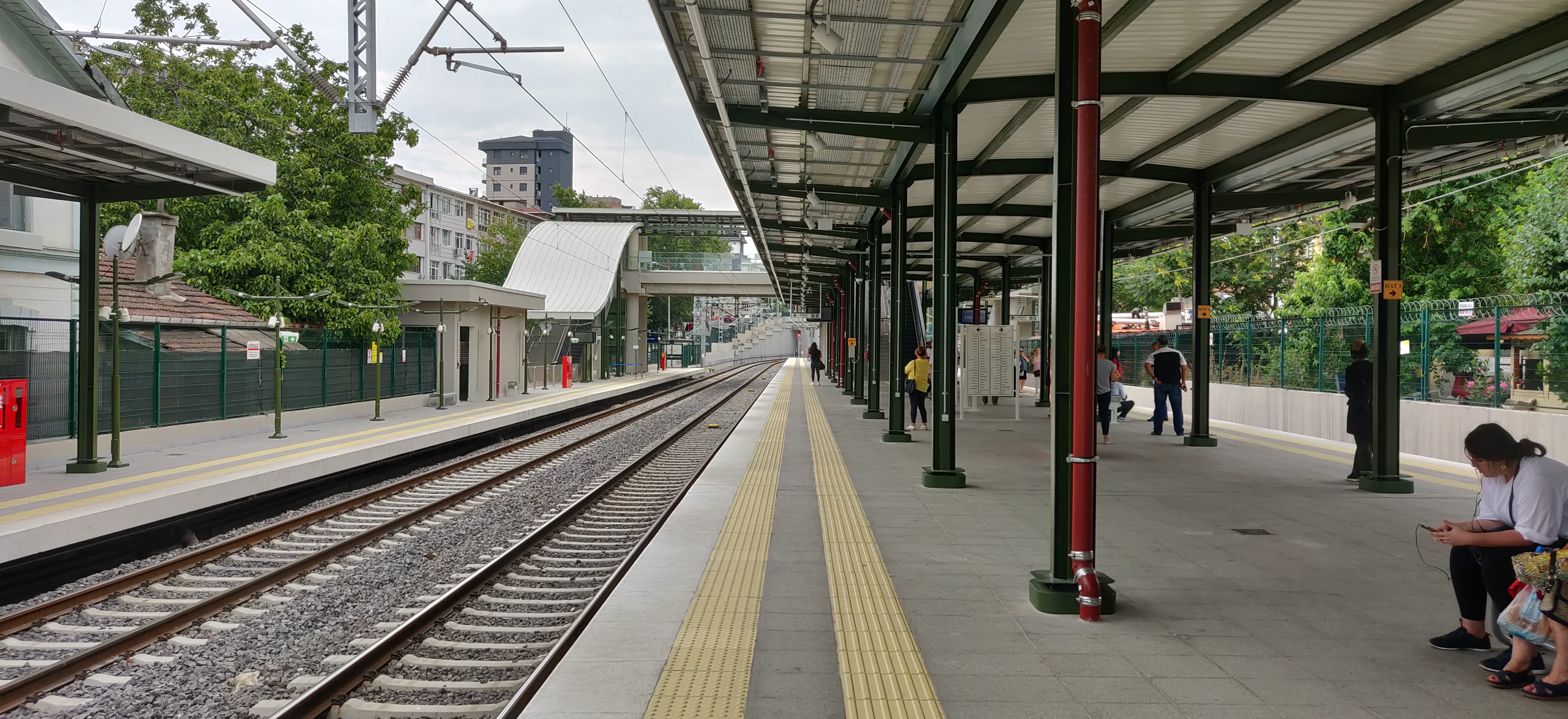
  Bostancı Marmaray station
  4 Ring
- 10B Kadıköy
- 10S Kadıköy
- 17S Yenimahalle
- 128 Mecidiyeköy-Mezarlık
- 129T Taksim
- 134BK Yahya Tahir Sokak
- 16D Kadıköy-Altkaynarca
- 16 Kadıköy-Pendik
- 4 Kadıköy-Maltepe

Metro

- M4 Kadıköy-Sabiha Gökçen International Airport
- M8 Bostancı-Parseller

Ferryboats

Inner city

- İDO Kadıköy
- İDO Kabataş
- İDO Kadıköy-Yenikapı-Bakırköy
- İDO Maltepe
- İDO Büyükada-Heybeliada-Burgazada-Kınalıada-Kabataş

Intercity

- İDO Kartal-Yalova
- İDO Yenikapı-Armutlu
- İDO Yenikapı-Marmara-Avşa

Suburban train

- Marmaray Train Line (Halkalı - Gebze)

== Images ==
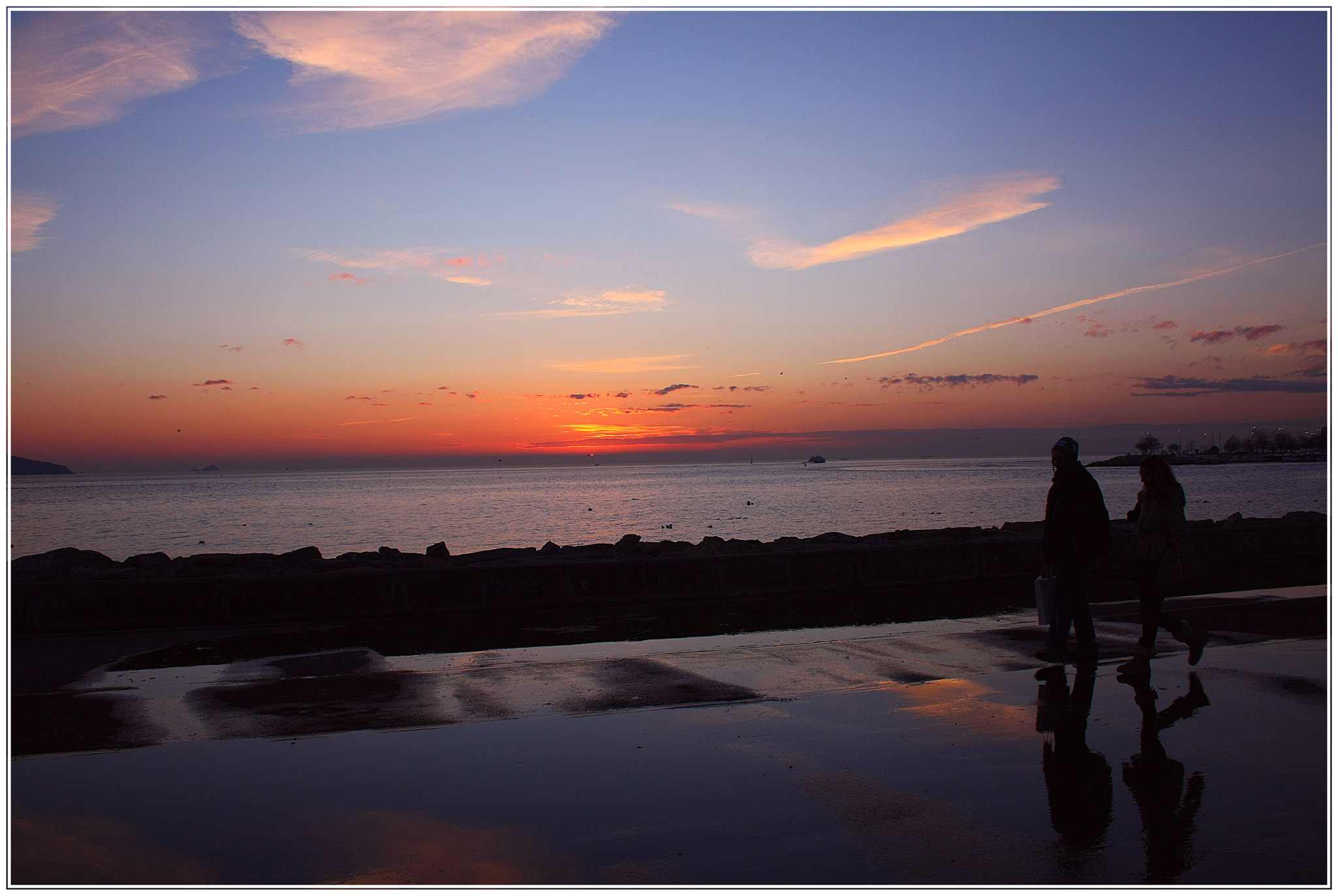
Sunset in Bostancı

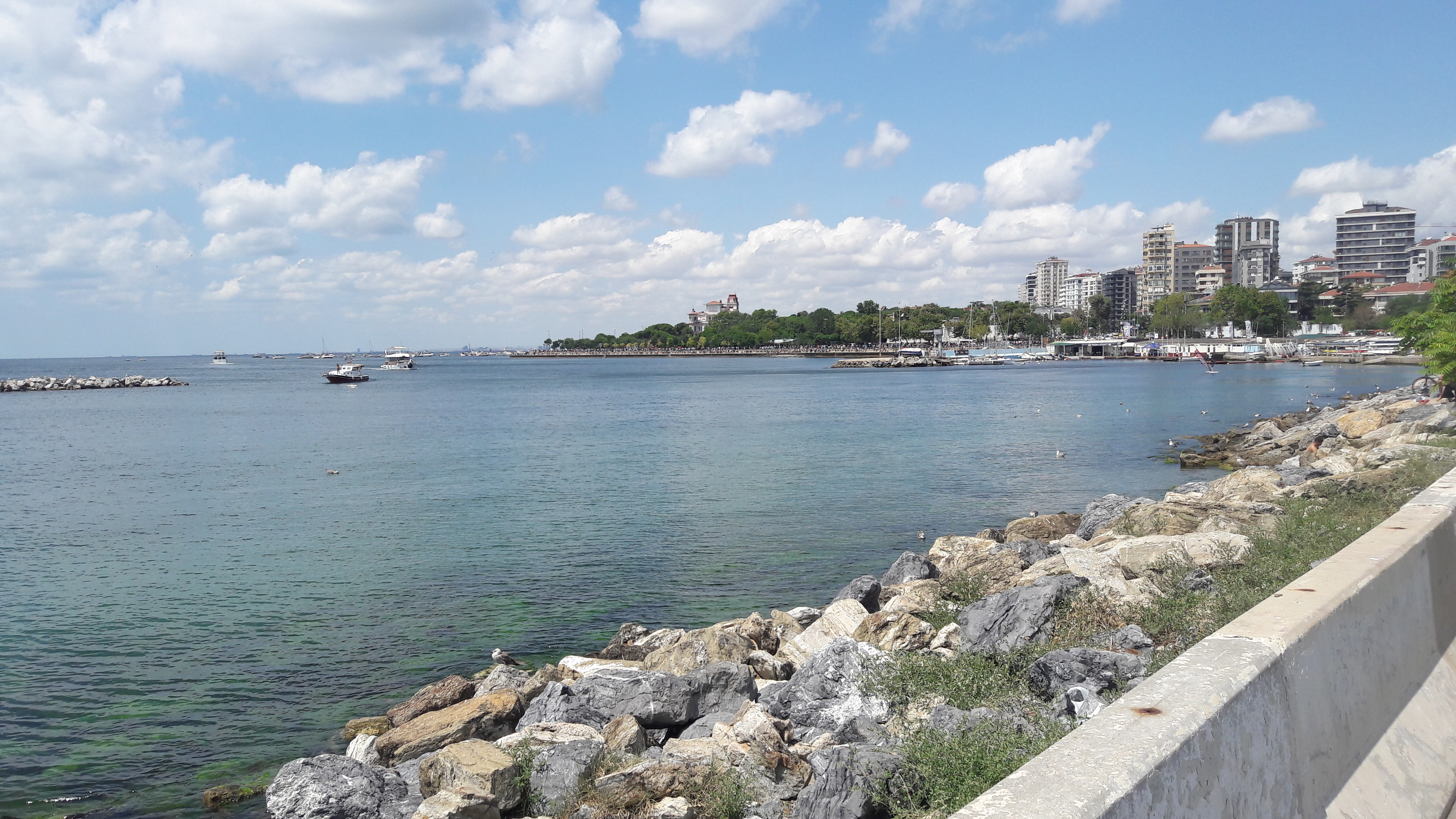
Bostancı Coast

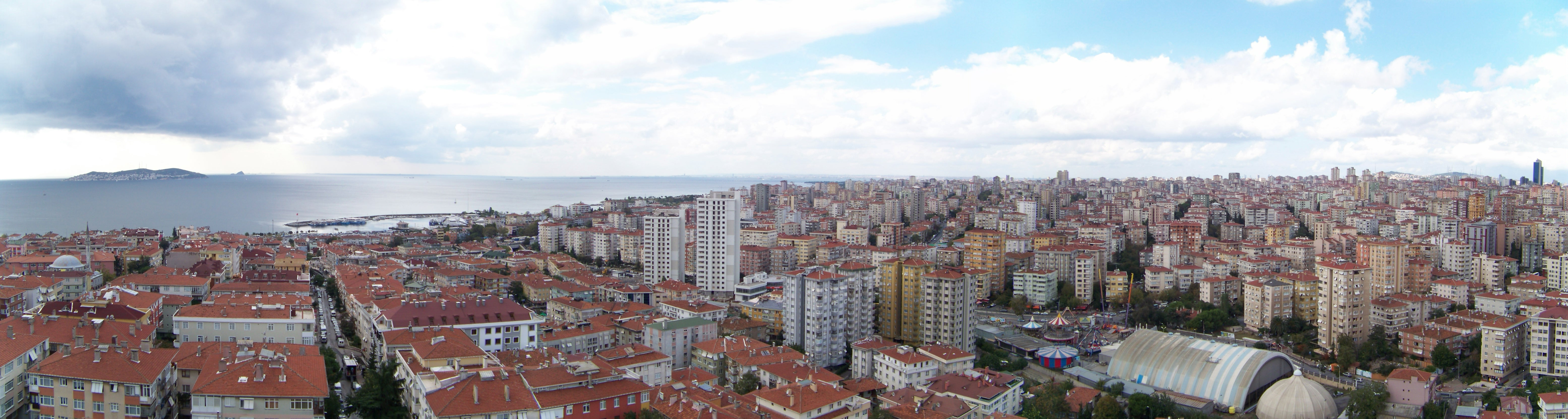
View of Bostancı from Altıntepe

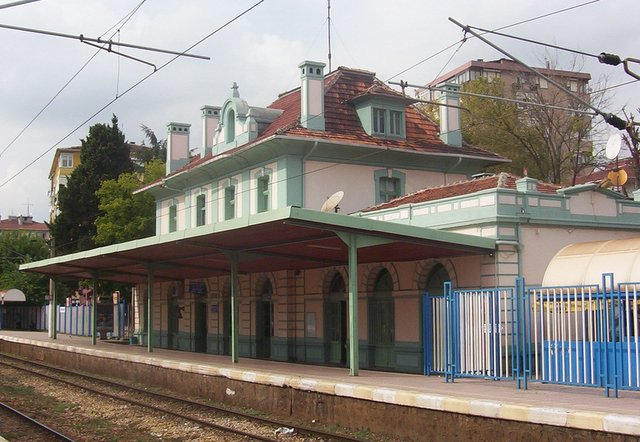
Historical Station of Bostancı

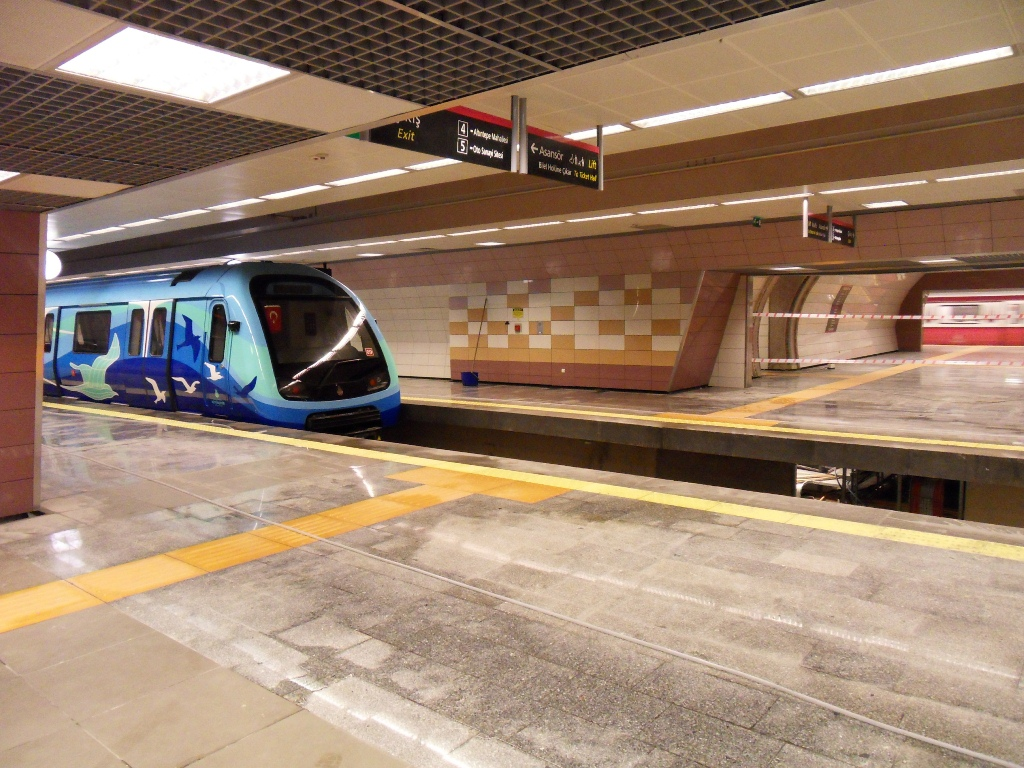
Bostancı Subway

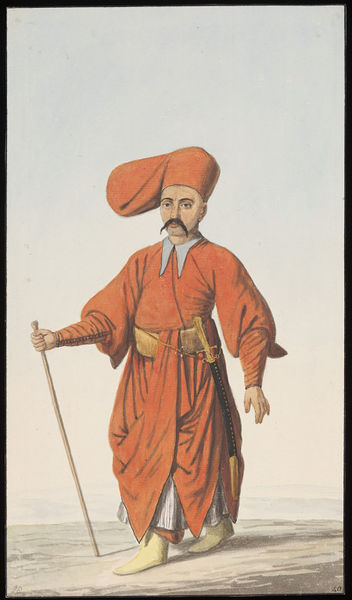
Bostanji Guards
