= Marmaray Tunnel =

Rail passage under the Bosporus

Marmaray Tunnel Marmaray Tüneli
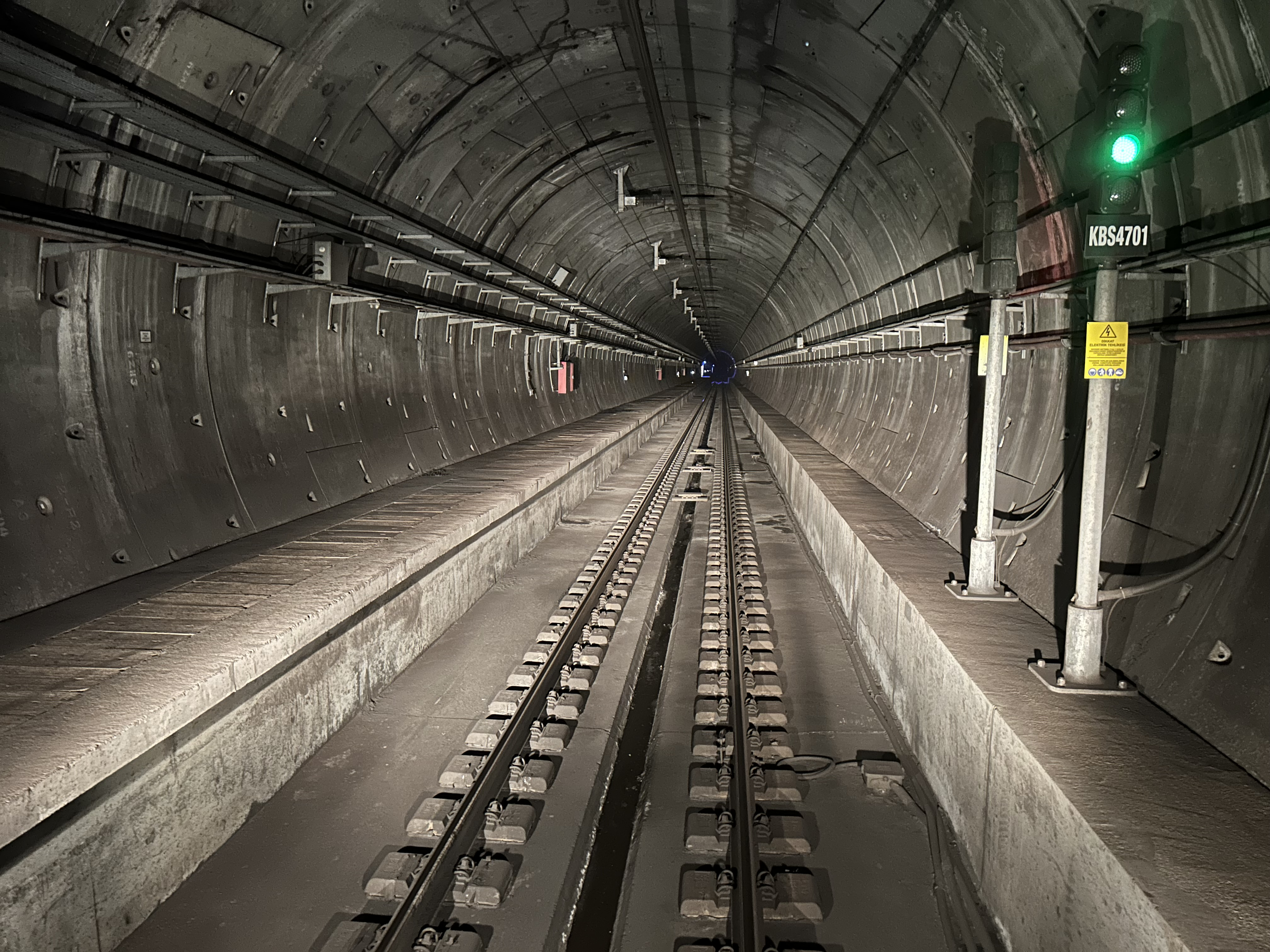
- One of the tunnels in 2024.

Overview
- Coordinates: Kazlıçeşme: 40°59′31″N 28°55′25″E; Ayrılıkçeşmesi: 41°00′03″N 29°01′49″E
- Status: Open
- Crosses: Bosporus
- Start: Kazlıçeşme, Zeytinburnu, Europe
- End: Ayrılıkçeşmesi, Kadıköy, Asia

Operation
- Opened: 29 October 2013
- Owner: Turkish State Railways
- Operator: TCDD Taşımacılık
- Character: Commuter rail

Technical
- Line length: 13.5 km (8.4 mi)
- No. of tracks: 2 single track tunnels
- Track gauge: 1,435 mm (4 ft 8 1/2 in) standard gauge
- Electrified: 25 kV AC 50 Hz Overhead line

The Marmaray Tunnel (Turkish: Marmaray Tüneli) is a 13.5 km (8.4 mi) long undersea railway tunnel in Istanbul, Turkey, beneath the Bosporus strait, linking Kazlıçeşme, Zeytinburnu in Europe with Ayrılıkçeşmesi in Asia. The tunnel consists of two single track tunnels with three underground railway stations: Yenikapı, Sirkeci and Üsküdar.

The Marmaray Tunnel was opened to passenger traffic on 29 October 2013. In March 2019 the overground part of the Marmaray project was completed and normal train traffic, including commuter (entire line), YHT and freight services started to run through the tunnel. The tunnel is the deepest immersed tube tunnel in the world.

== History ==
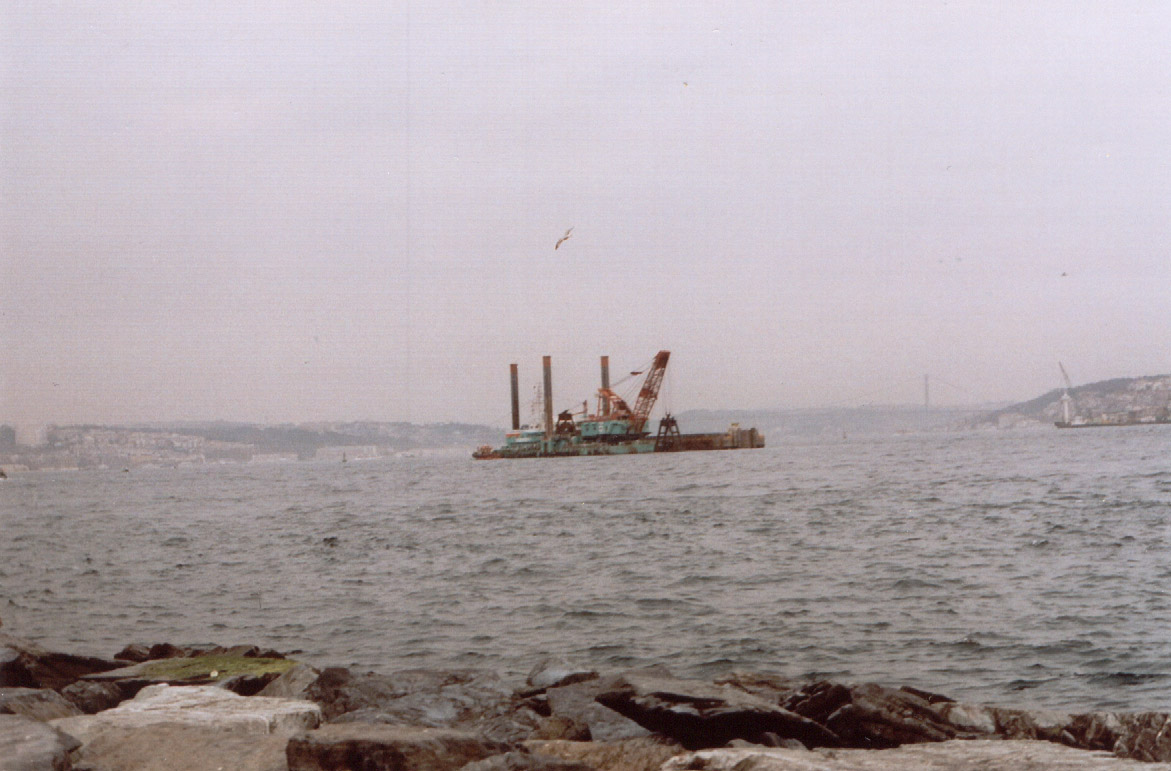
A barge lowering segments of the tunnel, observed on the Bosporus in 2007.

The construction of a railway tunnel beneath the Bosporus Strait dates back to 1860, when Sultan Abdulmejid I first proposed an undersea crossing of the strait. The project was proposed again in 1892, under Abdul Hamid II, when French engineers planned such a tunnel. The plan was never realized.

Plans to build a modern trans-Bosporus tunnel were proposed in 1997, based on a feasibility study ten years prior, and the necessary capital was secured in 1999. Preparatory works on the project began in 2001. Construction began in May 2004. The tunnel was constructed by a Turkish-Japanese consortium led by the Taisei Corporation. Tunnel construction was completed on 20 October 2008, and rails were added in 2009. The completion of the project was delayed due to archeological discoveries near Sirkeci, with artifacts dating back 8,000 years.

Test runs began on 6 August 2013, and operations began on 29 October, with a ceremony in Üsküdar.

== Operations ==
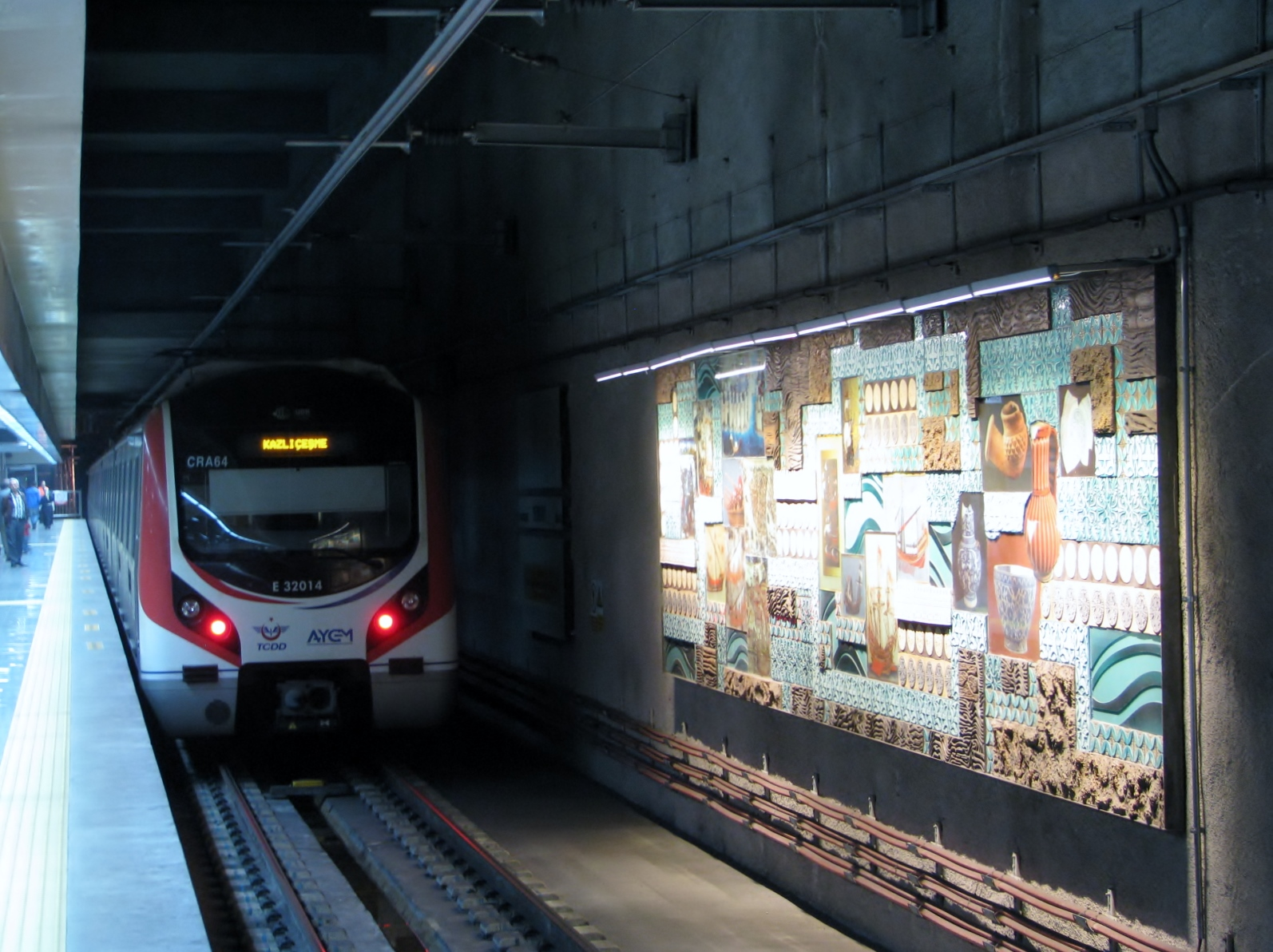
A Marmaray train at Yenikapı station.

The Turkish State Railways own the tunnel, while trains are operated by TCDD Taşımacılık. Both tunnels are electrified with 25 kV AC 50 Hz overhead wire.

The western portal to the tunnel is in Kazlıçeşme, Zeytinburnu on the European side of the city, just west of Fatih. Out of the three tracks that approach the west portal, two of them enter the tunnel, while the third track continues to Sirkeci station.

The eastern portal to the tunnel is located in Ayrılıkçeşmesi, Kadıköy on the Asian side of the city. Ayrılık Çeşmesi station is located right outside the east portal. After Ayrılık Çeşmesi station, the two tracks connect to the Istanbul-Ankara railway, from Haydarpaşa station, and continue towards Gebze and Anatolia.

As of November 2017, TCDD Taşımacılık operates 164 round-trips between Kazlıçeşme and Ayrılık Çeşmesi at intervals from every 5 minutes during peak hours, to 10/15 minutes during off-peak hours. In total, the Marmaray tunnels see 328 scheduled trains daily.

== Engineering ==
The undersea section of the Marmaray tunnel is the deepest immersed tube tunnel in the world, with its deepest point being 60 m (200 ft) below sea level. This section of the tunnel is 1,387 m (4,551 ft) long and consists of 11 sections lowered via barges on the Bosporus. Eight of these sections have a length of 135 m (443 ft), two of them have a length of 98.5 m (323 ft) and one with a length of 100 m (330 ft). These immersed tube tunnels are connected via bored tunnels on both sides. Before the tunnel sections were lowered, a portion of the ground underneath the Bosporus needed to be strengthened. This was done by lowering concrete columns 4 to 10 meters long which stabilized the area. The tunnels were assembled on dry docks in Tuzla and tested off Büyükada. After testing, they were dragged by tugboats to their positions at the southern end of the Bosporus.

Once the tunnels were lowered into place, they were covered with fill, dewatered and sealed.

Tunnel boring machines (TBMs) were used to drill the tunnels under land. The under land section of the tunnel consists of two tube tunnels, each with a single track. Walkways are present within each tube.
