= Ayrılık Çeşmesi railway station =

Train stop in eastern Istanbul

Ayrılık Çeşmesi
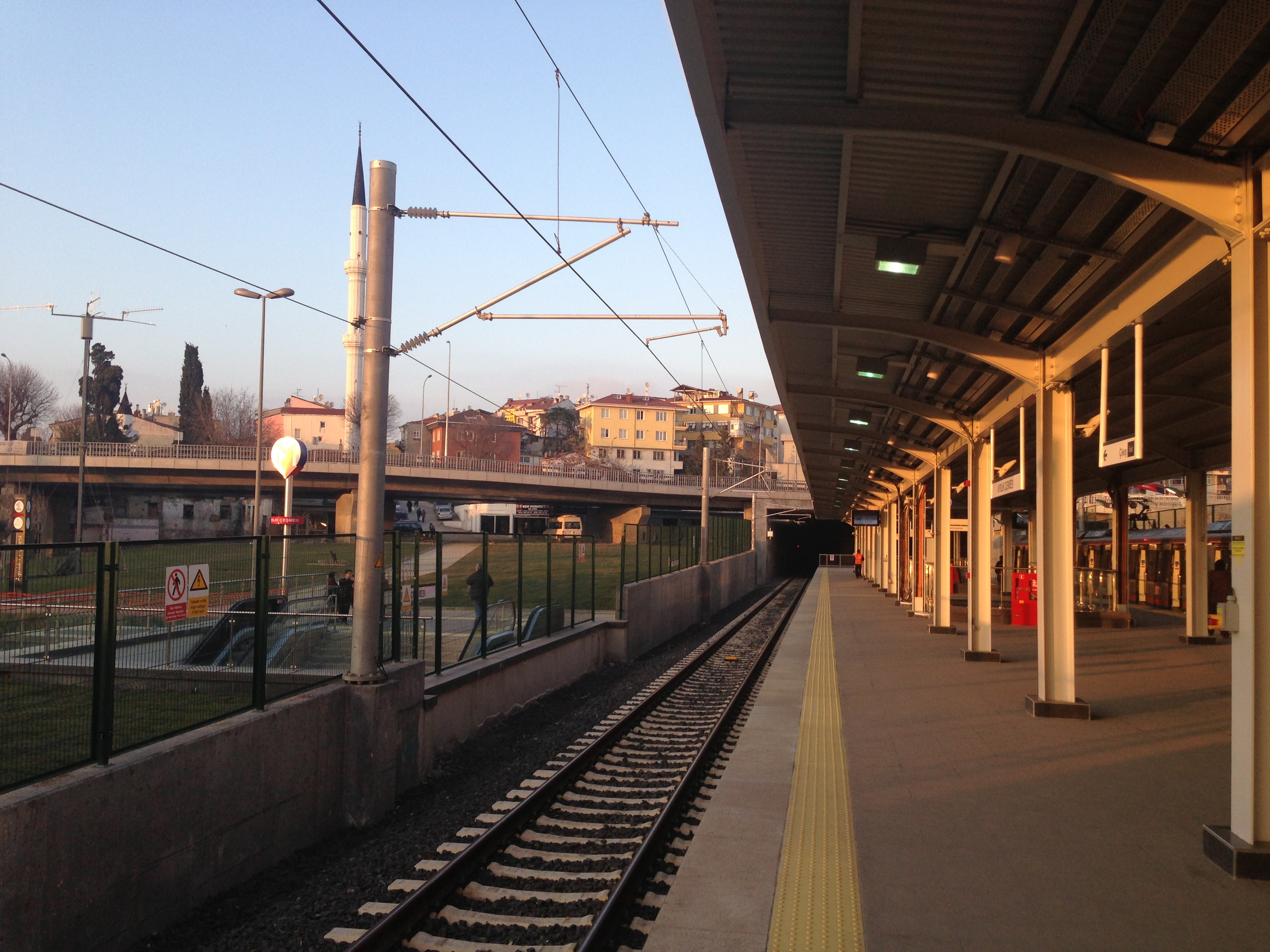
- Ayrılık Çeşmesi station with the portal to the Marmaray tunnel in the back.

General information
- Location: Dr. Eyüp Aksoy Cd., Rasimpaşa Mah., 34718; Kadıköy/Istanbul; Turkey
- Coordinates: 41.0003°N 29.0302°E
- System: TCDD Taşımacılık commuter rail station
- Owner: Turkish State Railways
- Operator: TCDD Taşımacılık
- Line: Marmaray Tunnel
- Platforms: 1 island platform
- Tracks: 2
- Connections: Istanbul Metro: at Ayrılık Çeşmesi; İETT Bus

Construction
- Structure type: At-grade
- Accessible: Yes

History
- Opened: 29 October 2013
- Electrified: 25 kV AC

Passengers
- 2017: 45,155 Average daily ridership

Services
Preceding station	TCDD Taşımacılık	Following station
Üsküdar towards Halkalı	Marmaray	Söğütlüçeşme towards Gebze
Location

Ayrılık Çeşmesi railway station (Turkish: Ayrılık Çeşmesi istasyonu) is a station on the Trans-Bosphorus Marmaray rail line. It is located right outside the Asian portal of Marmaray tunnel. The TCDD Taşımacılık operates commuter trains from Ayrılık Çeşmesi to Kazlıçeşme within 6- to 10-minute intervals. Connection to the M4 station of the Istanbul Metro is available.

Ayrılık Çeşmesi saw over 1.5 million boardings in October 2017, making it the second busiest station on the Marmaray line and constituting for 26% of all passenger boardings.

== Layout ==
Track 1	→ ← Marmaray toward Zeytinburnu or Halkalı
Island platform
Track 2	→ Marmaray toward Maltepe or Gebze →

== Equipment ==
The railway station features following equipment:

- 2 entrance and exit gates,
- 4 escalators,
- 1 elevator,
- 1 ticket office,
- 2 ticket vending machines,
- 1 credit loading machine for electronic tickets,
- 14 turnstiles including 2 for physically handicapped people and
- 10 passenger information screens.
