= Poleatikon =

Ancient Anatolian settlement

Coordinates: 40°57′23″N 29°05′20″E

Poleatikon was a coastal town of ancient Bithynia located on the road from Libyssa to Chalcedon on the north coast of the Propontis.

Its site is located near Bostancı in Asiatic Turkey.
