= Eyüp Pier =

General information
- Location: Bahariye Cd., Nişanca Mah., 34050; Eyüp, Istanbul; Turkey
- Coordinates: 41.0472°N 28.9375°E
- Operator: Şehir Hatları
- Line: Golden Horn Line
- Connections: İETT Bus: 36CE, 39Ç, 37M, 39, 39A, 39B, 39D, 39K, 39O, 39Y, 41Y, 44B, 48A, 48E, 86V, 94Y, 99, 99Y, 399B, 399C; Istanbul Minibus: Aksaray-Güzeltepe, Aksaray-İmar Blokları, Aksaray-Karayolları Mahallesi, Aksaray-Vialand, Cebeci Mahallesi-Eyüp, Gazi Mahallesi-Eyüp, Gaziosmanpaşa-Eyüp-Göktürk

Construction
- Accessible: Yes

History
- Rebuilt: 1989

Services
Preceding station	Şehir Hatları	Following station
Terminus	Golden Horn Line	Sütlüce towards Üsküdar
Location
- Location within Istanbul

Eyüp Pier (Turkish: Eyüp İskelesi) is a ferry slip on the Golden Horn in Eyüp, Istanbul. Located just south of Piyerloti Park, it is the westernmost pier on the Golden Horn. The Municipal ferry operator, Şehir Hatları, operates hourly ferry service from Eyüp to Üsküdar, stopping at seven other piers on the Golden Horn. This route is known as the Golden Horn Line.

It is unclear when Eyüp Pier was built, although public ferry service has been operating since the mid 19th century. The pier was rebuilt in 1989.
