= Turyol =

Ferry operator in western Turkey

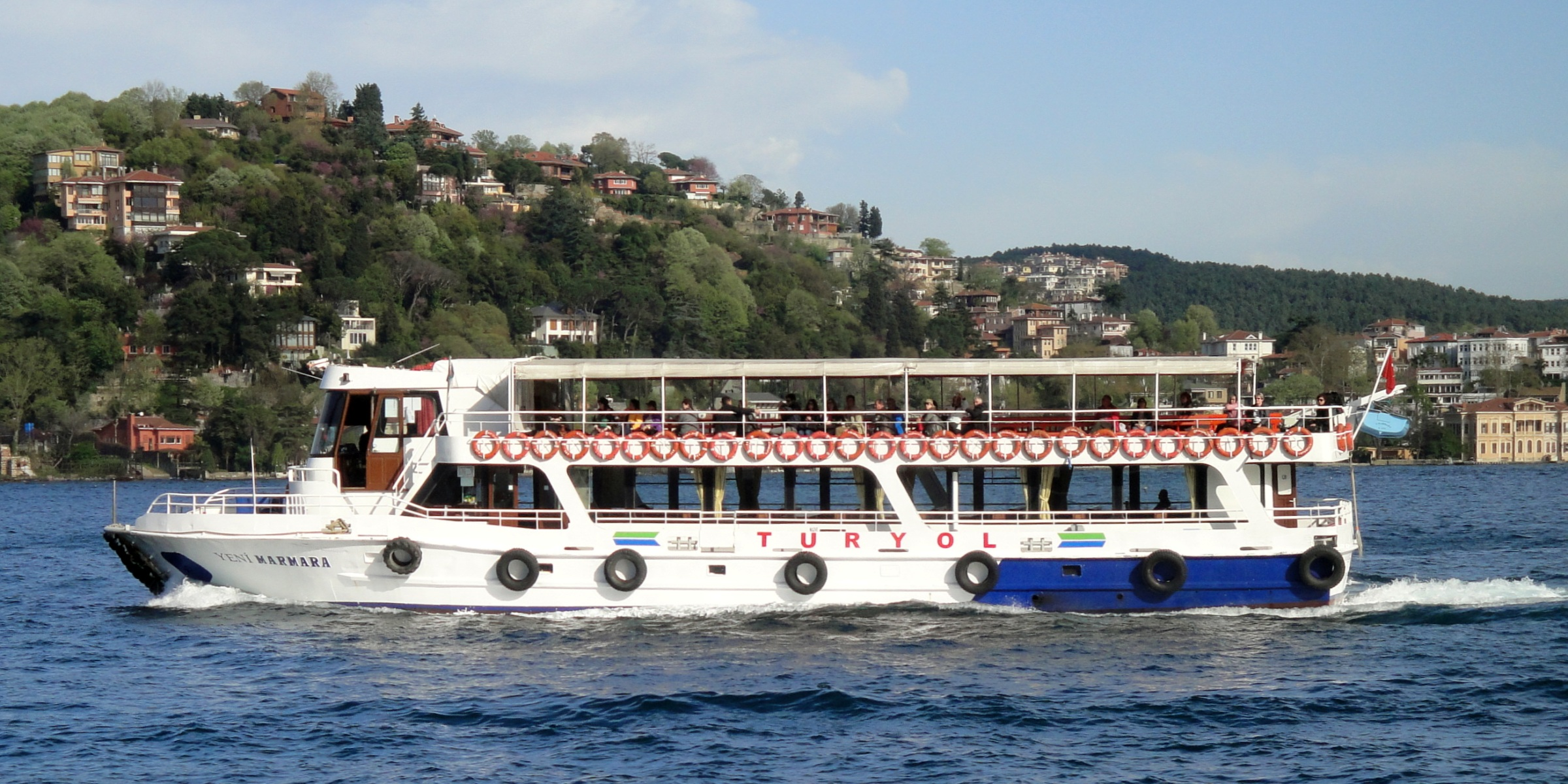
- A Turyol ferry on the Bosporus in Istanbul.
- Locale: Istanbul, İzmir
- Waterway: Bosporus; Golden Horn; Marmara Sea; Gulf of İzmir; Mytilini Strait; Chios Strait
- Transit type: Passenger Ferry; Car Ferry; Sightseeing
- Began operation: 1995
- No. of lines: 34
- No. of vessels: 70
- No. of terminals: 19
- Daily ridership: Approximately 50,000 (Istanbul only)
- Website: turyol.com

Turyol is a private ferry operator which owns and operates an urban and international ferry service in western Turkey, primarily around Istanbul. It is one of three private ferry operators in Istanbul, along with İDO and Dentur. Turyol maintains a fleet of 70 vessels, 60 of which are for scheduled passenger service. In terms of fleet size and the number of lines, Turyol is the largest private ferry operator in Turkey and second-largest overall, after the Istanbul Municipality's ferry operator, Şehir Hatları.

Turyol operates its ferry service within four areas of western Turkey. The largest of these four areas is in and around Istanbul, where Turyol operates a commuter ferry service to 19 piers on the Bosporus, Golden Horn and Marmara Sea. Outside of the Istanbul area, Turyol operates an international car ferry service from Turkey to two Greek islands: Lesbos and Chios. The ferry to Lesbos departs from Ayvalık, while the ferry to Chios departs from Çeşme. A seasonal ferry service between Foça, Mordoğan and Karaburun on the Gulf of İzmir operates during the summer months.

Turyol operates a fleet of 70 vessels, along with two maintenance vessels. 60 of these are designated for scheduled passenger service.

== See also ==
- İDO
- Ferries in Istanbul
