= Kabataş, Beyoğlu =

Coordinates: 41°02′03″N 28°59′32″E

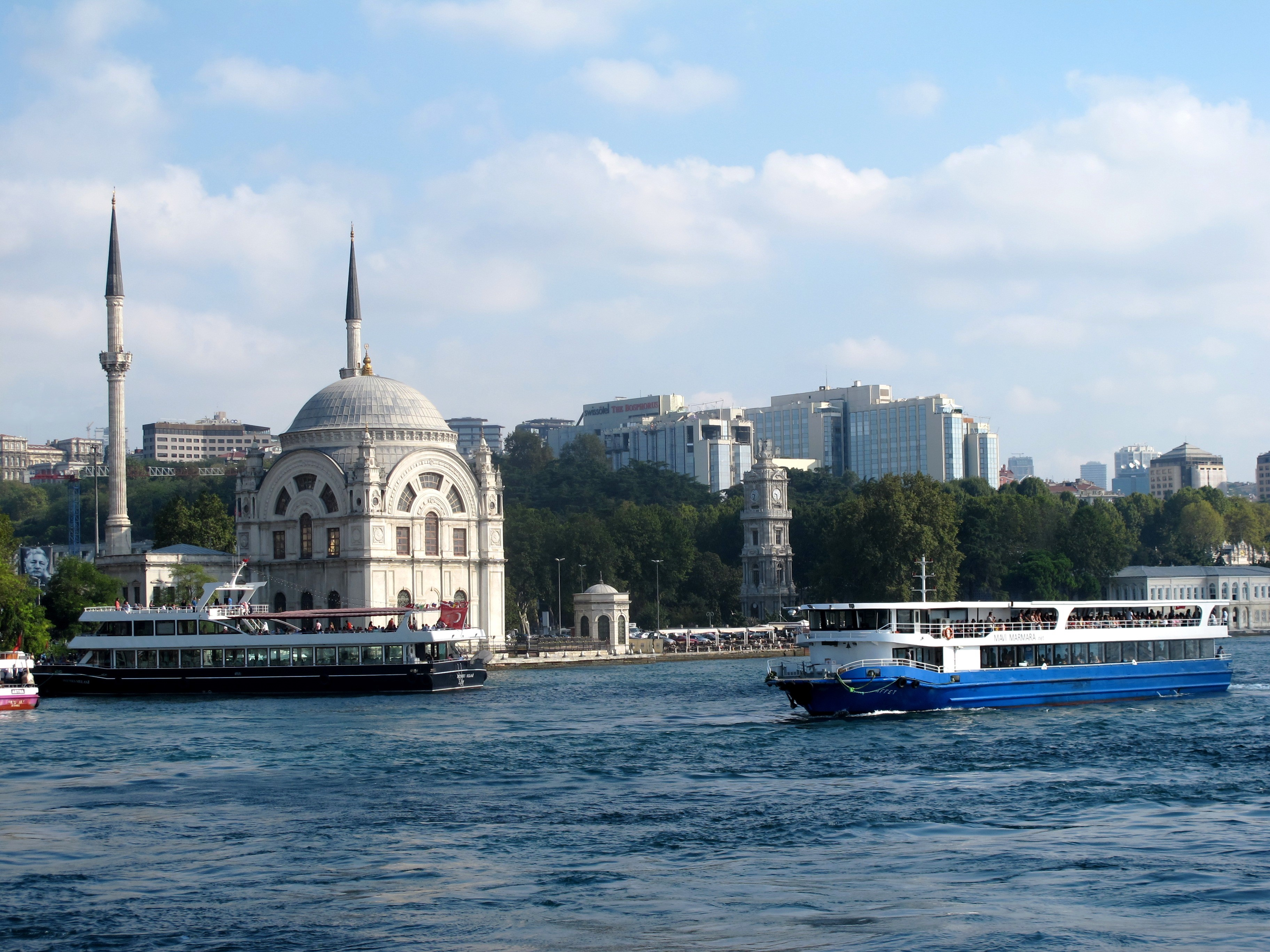
View of Kabataş from the Dolmabahçe Mosque.

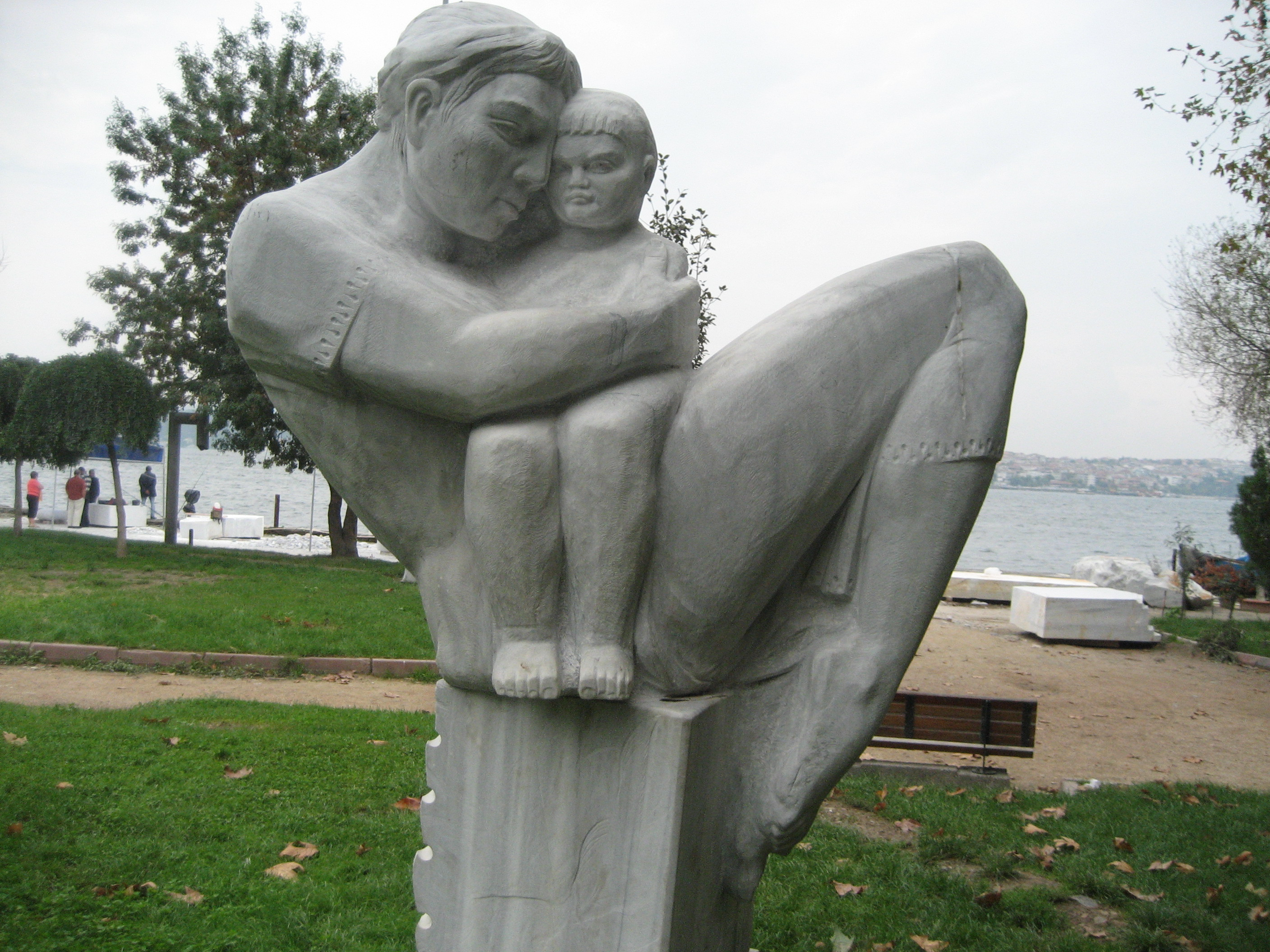
View of Fındıklı Park in Kabataş

Kabataş is a busy waterside area of Beyoğlu municipality on the European shore of the Bosphorus between Karaköy and Beşiktaş in Istanbul, Turkey.

It is a major transport interchange served by the T1 tram line to Bağcılar and the funicular railway to Taksim Square. Ferries depart for Üsküdar and Kadıköy on the Asian shore as well as to the Princes Islands. There are also high-speed ferry services to Bursa.

== Historical and famous places ==
Kabataş is home to the 19th-century Dolmabahçe Mosque and the Vodafone Park Stadium used by the Beşiktaş J.K. football team.
