= Ferries in Istanbul =

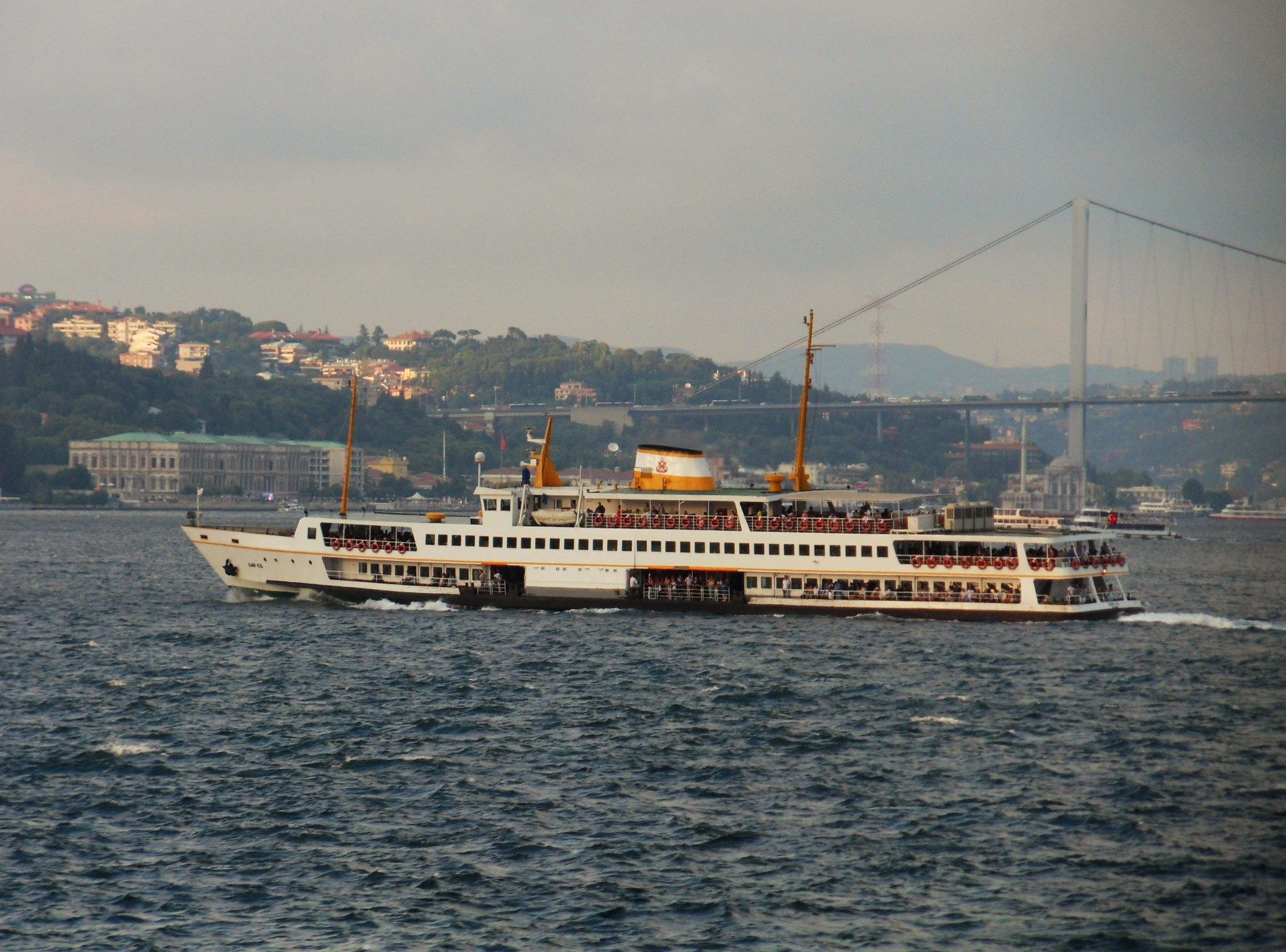
Ferries have been operating on the Bosphorus since 1851.

Ferries in Istanbul are a mode of public transportation within and surrounding the city of Istanbul, Turkey. There are three major ferry operators in the city: the municipally owned Şehir Hatları ("City Lines"), which operates traditional vapurs; the privately operated İstanbul Deniz Otobüsleri (İDO) ("İstanbul Sea Busses"), which operates high-speed urban and intercity services, and the privately owned Turyol which operates mostly urban services.

== Ferry operators ==
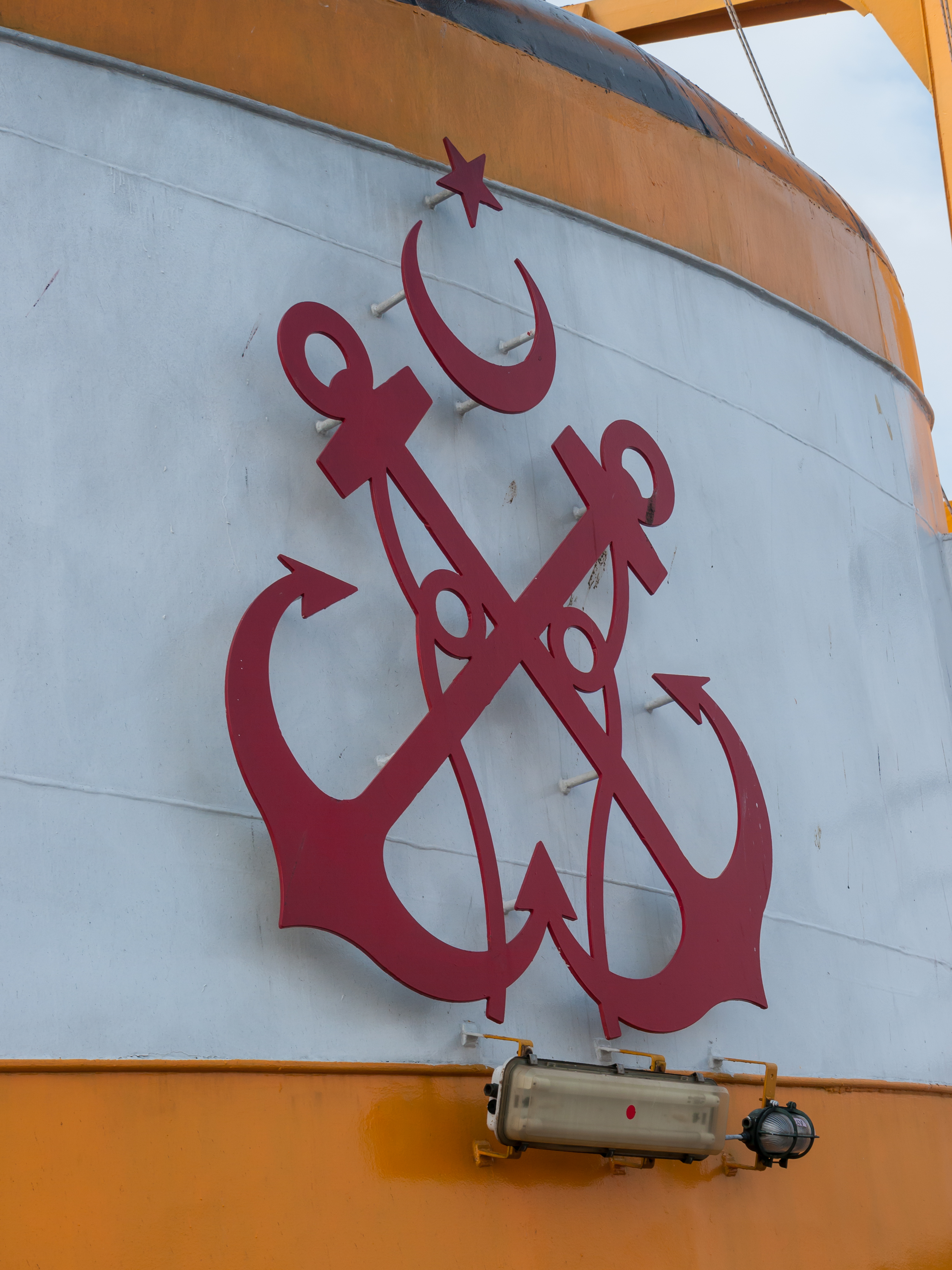
Logo of Şehir Hatları

Flag of İBB Şehir Hatları

=== Şehir Hatları ===
The city's largest and oldest ferry operator is the municipally owned Şehir Hatları ("City Lines"). Founded in 1851 as the Şirket-i Hayriye (“The Goodwill Company”), Şehir Hatları operates the city's iconic white and orange ferries (vapurs). Şehir Hatları currently operates 30 ferries between 53 piers on 32 lines, serving both sides of the Bosphorus as well as the Princes' Islands. In 2023 Şehir Hatları transported 40 million passengers.

=== Istanbul Sea Buses (İDO) ===
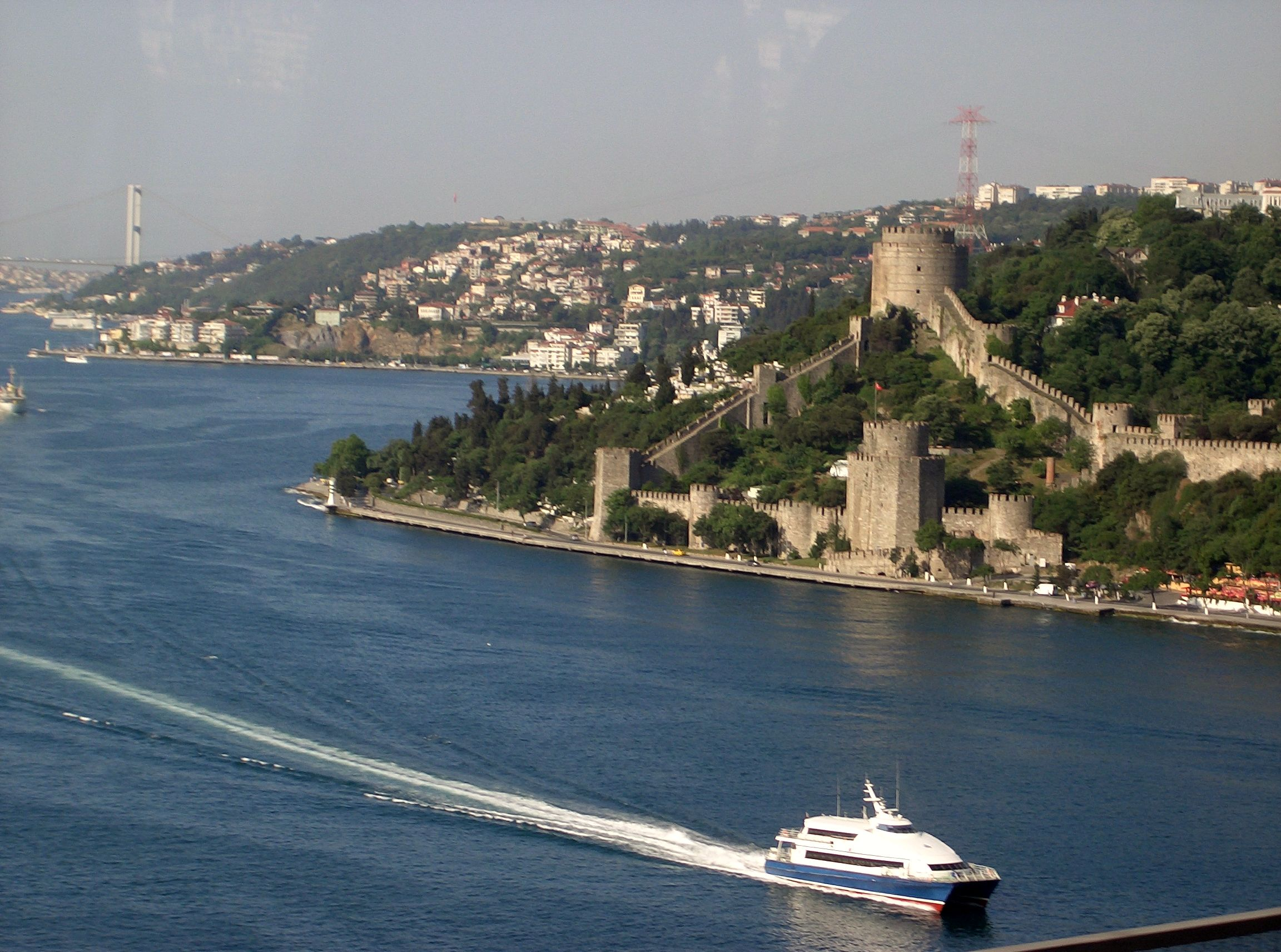
A Seabus and the Rumeli Castle, viewed from the Fatih Sultan Mehmet Bridge on the Bosphorus

Istanbul Sea Buses (İstanbul Deniz Otobusleri, İDO) runs a combination of catamaran-type high-speed ferries and vehicle ferries within Istanbul and across the Sea of Marmara to provinces such as Bursa and Yalova. Ido was established in 1987 by the İstanbul Metropolitan Municipality and was privatized in April 2011. Today, İDO, maintains a fleet of 26 high-speed passenger ferries and 22 vehicle ferries serving 21 piers across the Marmara Region.

=== Turyol ===
Another smaller private ferry company, Turyol, provides frequent services on routes from Eminönü, Kabataş, Beyoğlu and Karaköy to piers at Üsküdar, Haydarpaşa and Kadıköy, among others.

== History ==
Boats have traversed the waters of the Bosphorus for millennia and until the opening of the first Bosphorus bridge in 1973, were the only mode of transport between the European and Asian halves of Istanbul. They continue to serve as a key public transport link for many thousands of commuters, tourists and vehicles every day.

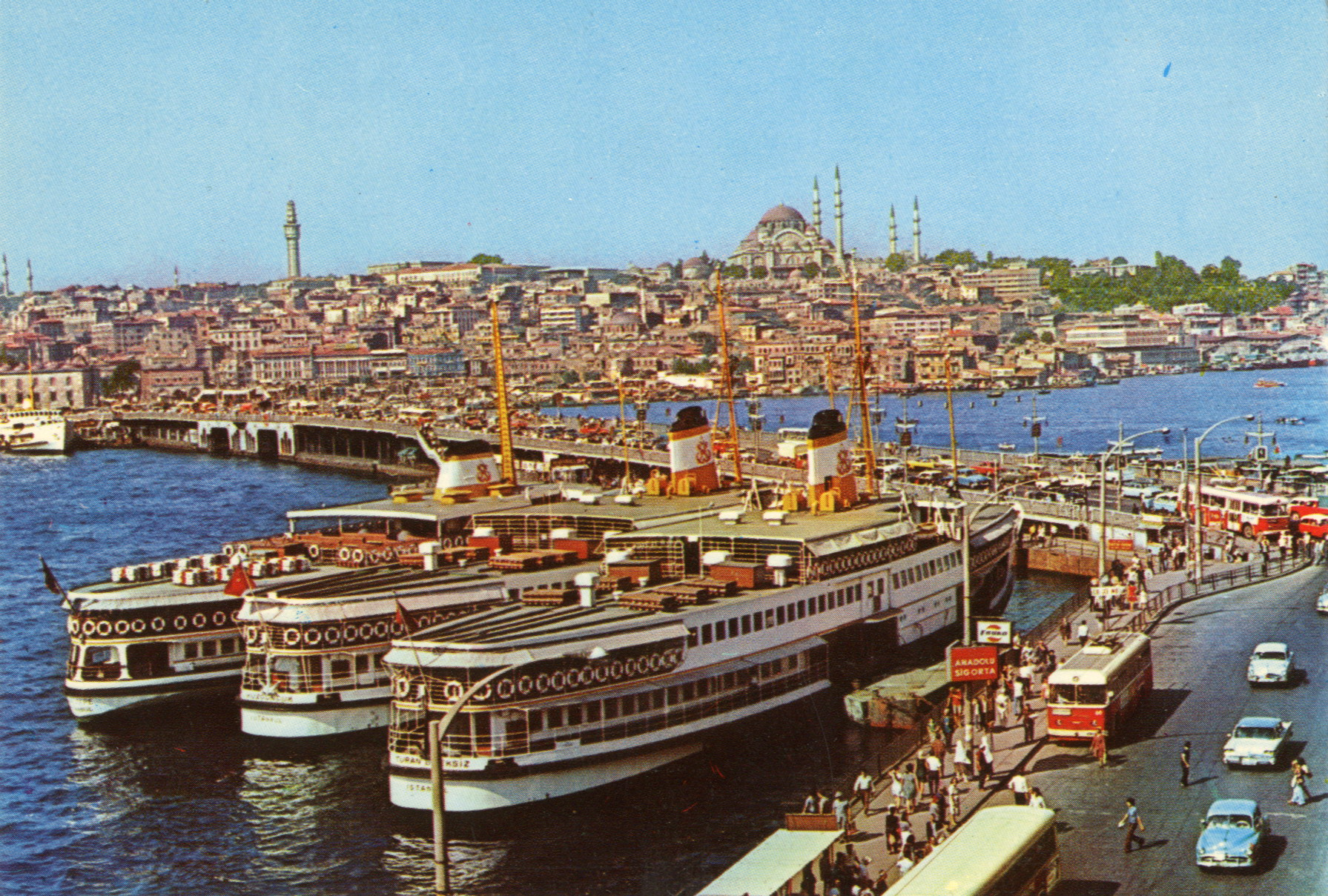
Şehir Hatları ferries c. 1950

The first private steam ferries (called vapurs in Turkish), crossed the Bosphorus in 1837. The first ferries were wooden paddle boats and were later replaced by iron and steel screw ships. In 1851, the Şirket-i Hayriye [tr] (literally “The Goodwill Company”, as the Istanbul Ferry Company was originally called) was established by the Ottoman state. The Şirket-i Hayriye, renamed Şehir Hatları in the early republican period. In 1937, Şehir Hatları was nationalised and came under the control of the state-owned Türkiye Denizcilik İşletmeleri (TDİ) (“Turkish Maritime Lines ”). The TDİ was largely privatised in the late 90s and early 2000s and ownership of the Şehir Hatları was transferred to the İstanbul Metropolitan Municipality in March 2006.

Several generations of ferries have served the city and many of the earlier ferries were built by the Fairfield Shipbuilding and Engineering Company, Glasgow, Scotland. These white, black and yellow boats have gone on to become iconic in the modern popular culture of the city. One was featured in the James Bond film From Russia with Love, while more recently a new-generation and therefore historically inaccurate ferry appeared momentarily in the 2012 film Tinker, Tailor, Soldier, Spy, which was set in the 1970s. The last steam-powered ferry ran until 2003. A new generation of boats, designed by Fairfield but built in Istanbul, came into operation in the 2000s, enhancing the historic fleet.

== Lines operated by Şehir Hatları ==
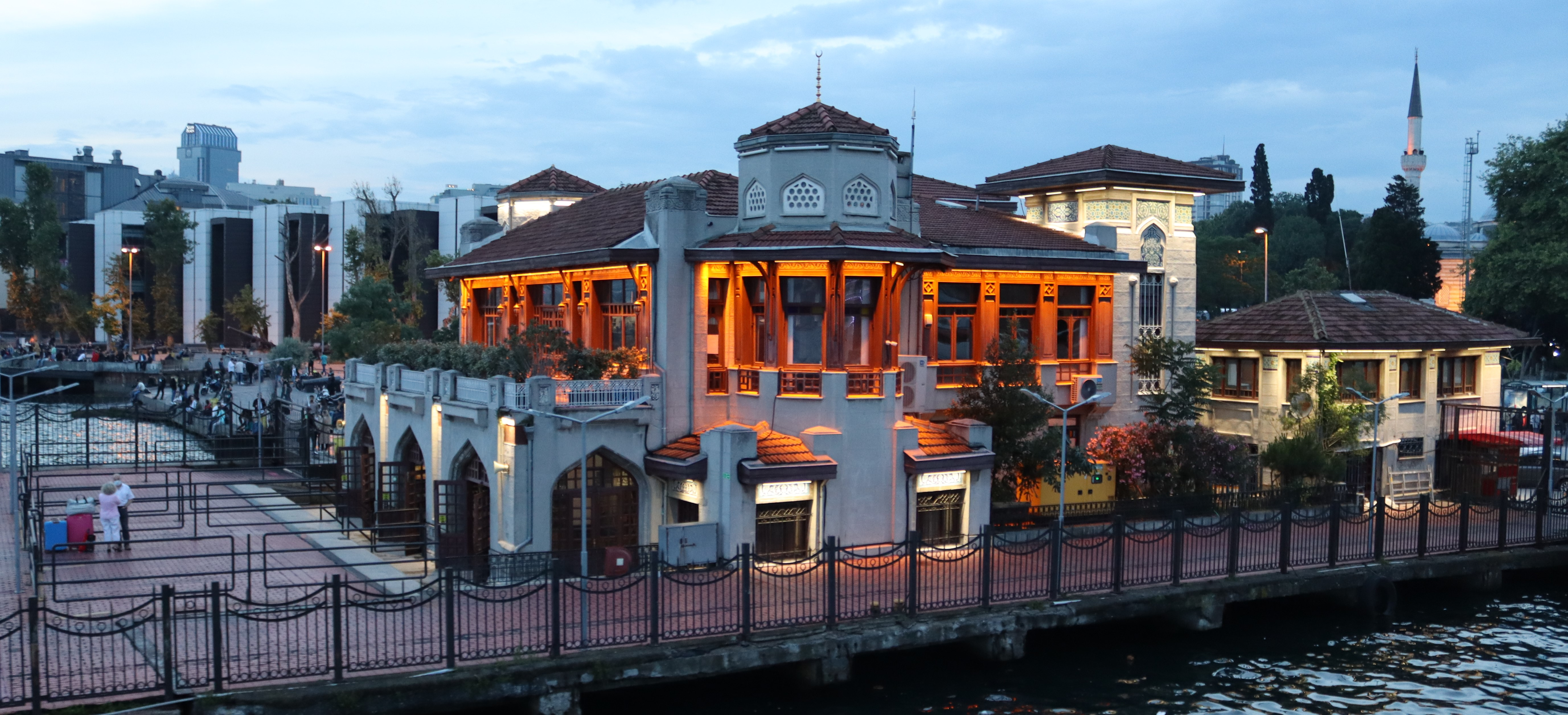
Beşiktaş Pier at night

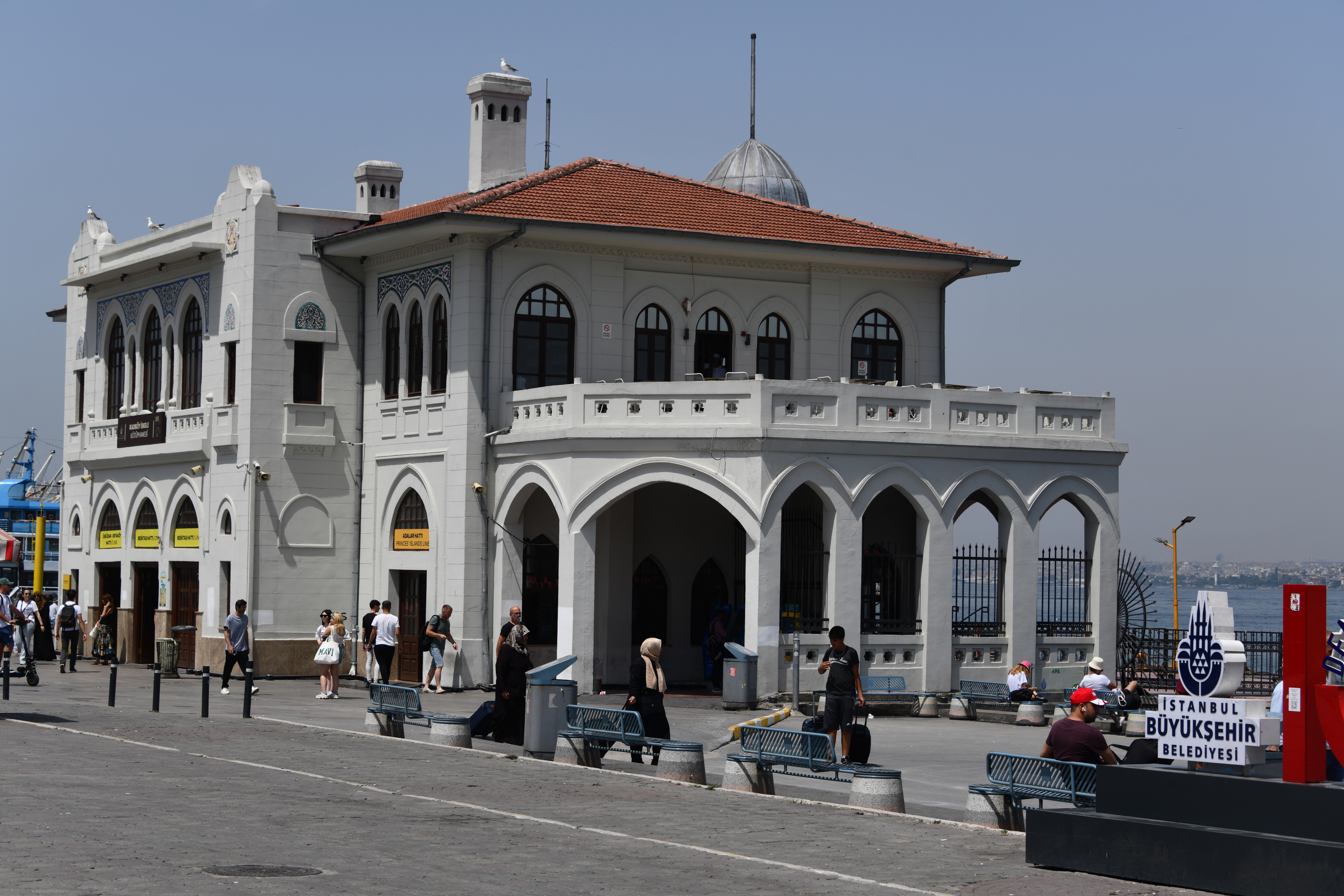
Kadıköy Pier at day

=== Inner Istanbul Lines ===
- Kadıköy - Karaköy - Eminönü
- Kadıköy - Beşiktaş
- Kadıköy - Karaköy - Beşiktaş (Only operates on Friday and Saturday nights)
- Kadıköy - Kabataş
- Üsküdar - Karaköy - Eminönü
- Bostancı - Karaköy - Kabataş
- Golden Horn Line (Üsküdar - Karaköy - Kasımpaşa - Fener - Balat - Hasköy - Ayvansaray - Sütlüce - Eyüpsultan)
- Aşiyan - Anadolu Hisarı - Küçüksu (Ring)
- Aşiyan - Üsküdar
- Kadıköy - Kasımpaşa - Fener - Hasköy - Sütlüce - Eyüpsultan
- Beşiktaş - Kabataş - Karaköy - Kasımpaşa - Sütlüce - Eyüpsultan
- Çengelköy - Kabataş
- Bostancı - Moda - Kadıköy - Kabataş
- Avcılar - Bakırköy - Yenikapı - Kadıköy (Operated by IDO for Şehir Hatları)
- Avcılar - Bostancı (Operated by IDO for Şehir Hatları)

=== Bosphorus Lines ===
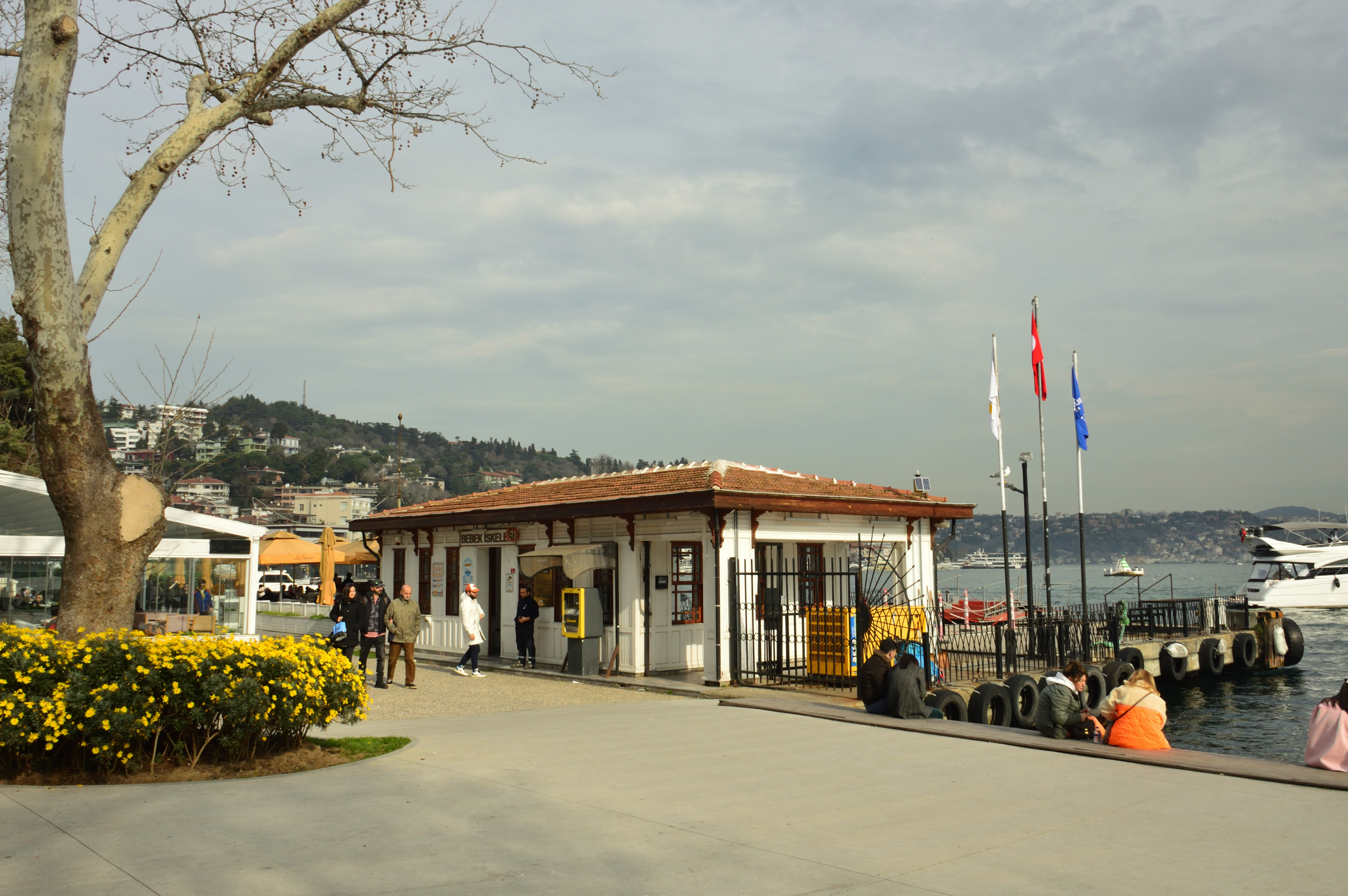
Bebek Pier

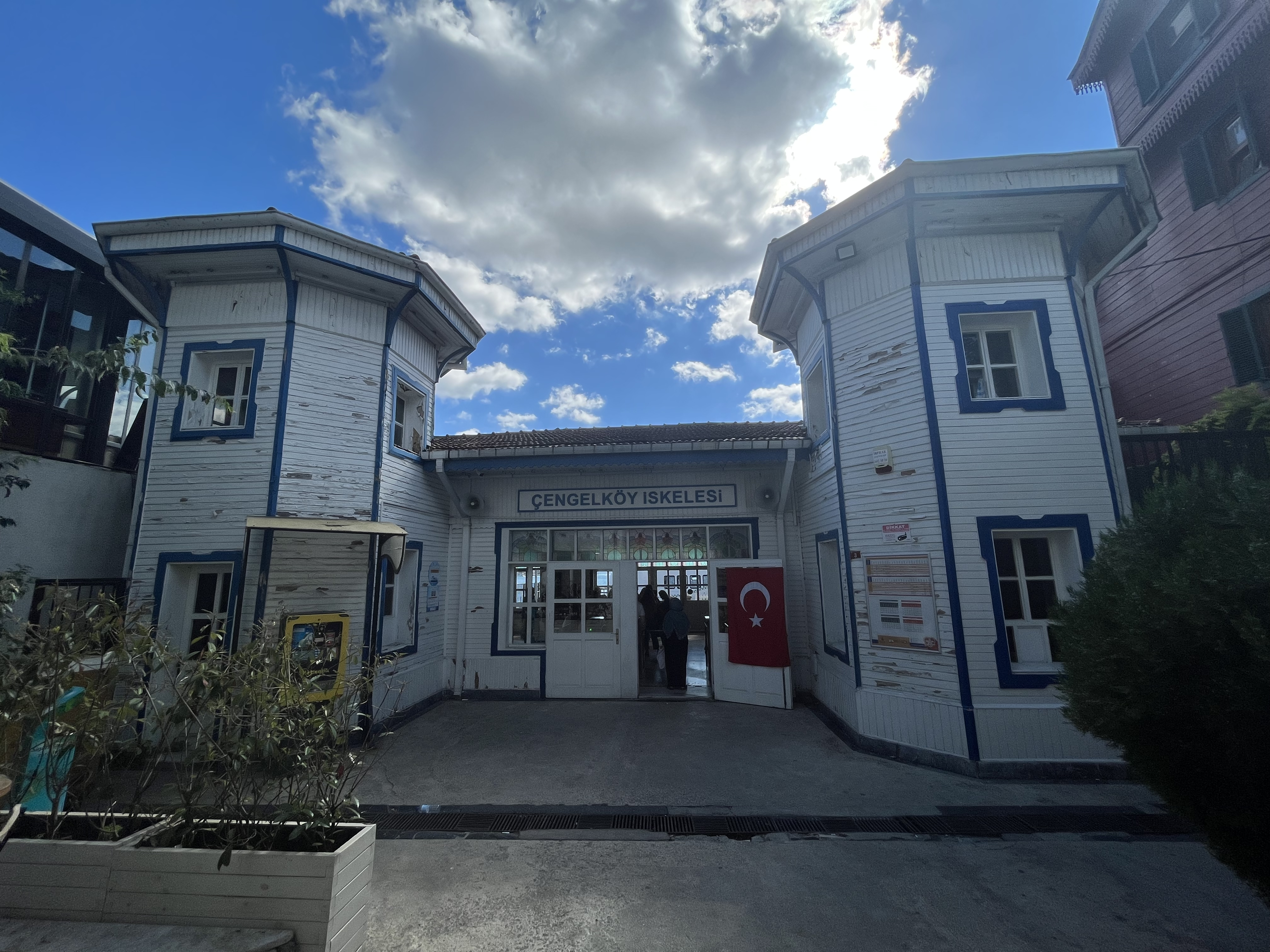
Çengelköy Pier at day

- Sarıyer - Rumeli Kavağı - Anadolu Kavağı (Stops at 'Poyraz' pier during the summer season)
- Sarıyer - Beykoz
- Küçüksu - Beşiktaş - Kabataş
- Çengelköy - İstinye
- Küçüksu - İstinye
- Anadolu Kavağı - Üsküdar
- Rumeli Kavağı - Eminönü
- Bebek - Emirgan
- Kadıköy - Sarıyer
- Ortaköy - Üsküdar - Kadıköy
- Ortaköy - Beşiktaş - Eminönü

=== Princes' Islands Lines ===
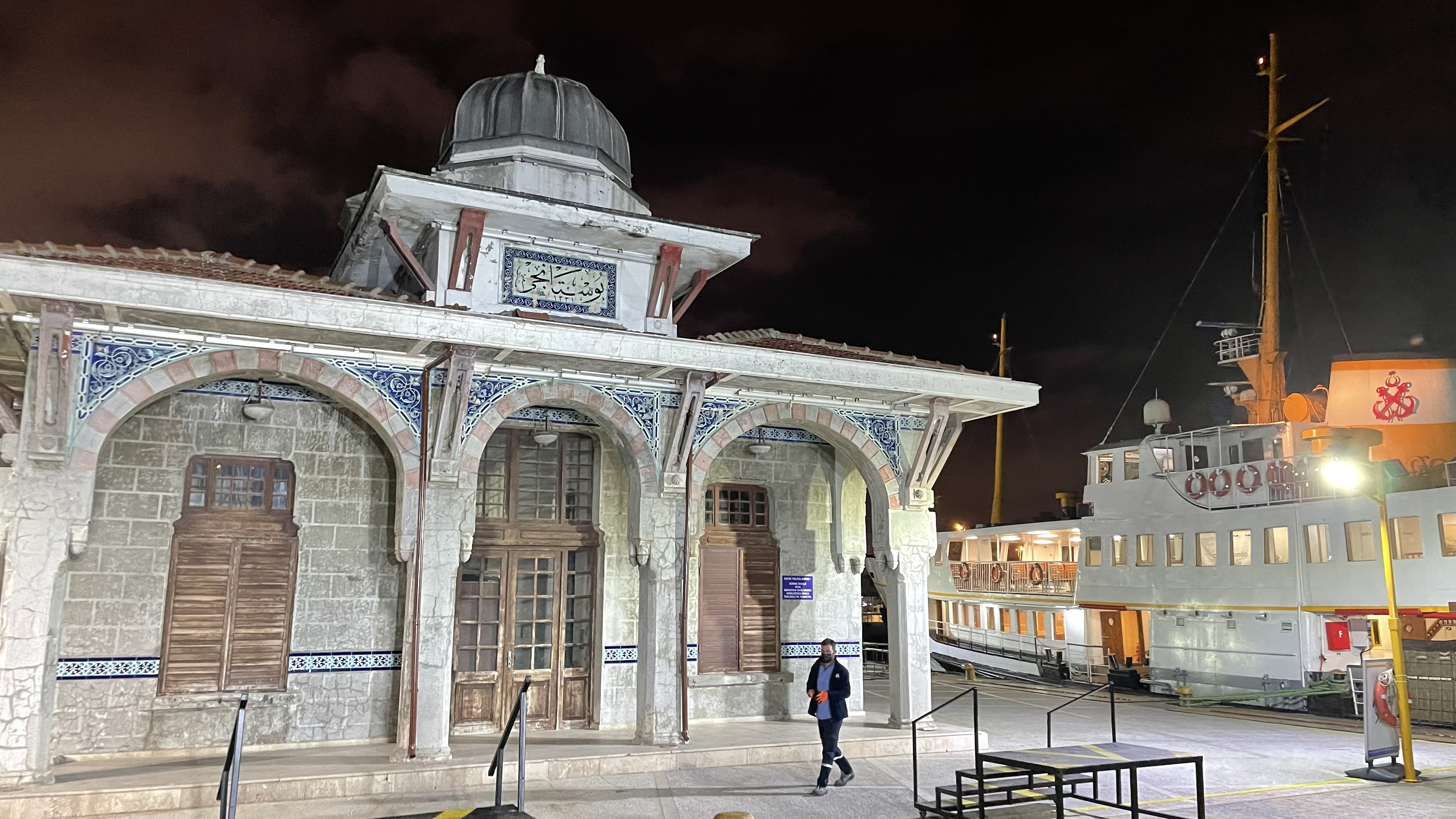
Bostancı Pier

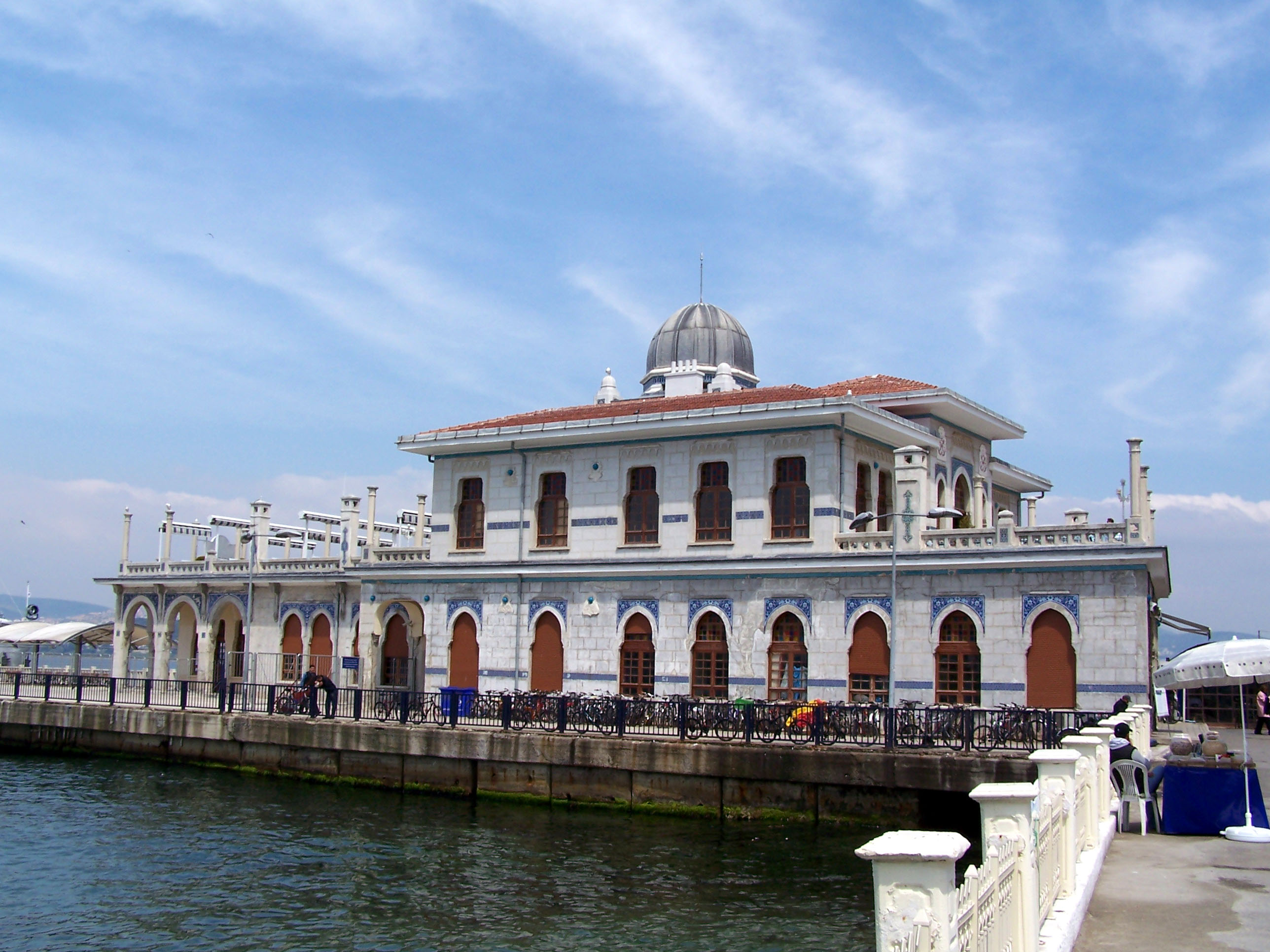
Büyükada Pier

- Beşiktaş - Adalar - Kadıköy
- Bostancı - Adalar (Ring)
- Bostancı - Büyükada - Sedef Adası (Only during the summer season)
- Kabataş - Kadıköy - Adalar
- Maltepe - Adalar (Büyükada - Heybeliada - Burgazada - Kınalıada)

=== Bosphorus tours ===
- Long Bosphorus Tour
- Short Bosphorus Tour

=== Vehicle ferry line ===
- İstinye - Çubuklu

== Fleet ==
=== Şehir Hatları Fleet ===
Class	Ship Name	Capacity (Summer/Winter)	Type	Commission Date	Builder	Notes
	M/S Prof. Dr. Aykurt Barka	2100/1684	Vapur	1973	İstanbul	Formerly known as "Sedefadası"
	M/S Barış Manço	2100/1684	Vapur	1973	İstanbul	Formerly known as "İnciburnu"
	M/S Ahmet H. Yıldırım	2100/1797	Vapur	1974	İstanbul	Formerly known as "Bostancı"
	M/S Fahri S. Korutürk	2100/1470	Vapur	1989	İstanbul	
	M/S Emin Kul	2100/1470	Vapur	1989	İstanbul	Formerly known as "Bahçekapı"
Fatih	M/S Sarıyer	1800/900	Vapur	2010	İstanbul	
Fatih	M/S Kadıköy	1800/900	Vapur	2009	İstanbul	
Fatih	M/S Fatih	1800/900	Vapur	2008	İstanbul	
Fatih	M/S Beyoğlu	1800/900	Vapur	2009	Çeliktrans Shipyard	
Fatih	M/S Beykoz	1800/900	Vapur	2009	Çeliktrans Shipyard	
Bahçe	M/S Paşabahçe	1700/1700	Vapur	1952	Cantieri navali Tosi di Taranto	Decommissioned in 2010. Recommissioned in 2022 after significant renovations at the Haliç Shipyard. Oldest active vessel in the Şehir Hatları fleet.
Bahçe	M/S Fenerbahçe	N/A	Vapur	1952	William Denny & Brothers	Decommissioned in 2009. On loan to the Rahmi M. Koç Museum.
Köy	M/S Şehit Sami Akbulut	1450/1340	Vapur	1985	Haliç Shipyard	Formerly known as "Sarayburnu"
Köy	M/S Şehit Metin Sülüş	1450/1340	Vapur	1986	Haliç Shipyard	
Köy	M/S Prof. Dr. Alaeddin Yavaşça	1512/1259	Vapur	1987	Haliç Shipyard	Formerly known as "Kalamış"
Köy	M/S Nurettin Alptoğan	1450/1340	Vapur	1985	Haliç Shipyard	Formerly known as "Bayraklı"
Köy	M/S Moda	1519/1266	Vapur	1986	Haliç Shipyard	
Köy	M/S İ. Hakkı Durusu	1450/1340	Vapur	1985	Haliç Shipyard	Formerly known as "Karşıyaka"
Köy	M/S Prof. Dr. Fuat Sezgin	1500/1259	Vapur	1987	Haliç Shipyard	Formerly known as "Caddebostan"
Köy	M/S Beşiktaş I	1450/1340	Vapur	1986	Haliç Shipyard	
Köy	M/S Kızıltoprak	1450/1340	Vapur	1988	İstinye Shipyard	
Şüheda	M/S Şehit Mustafa Aydoğdu	1450/1340	Vapur	1981	Haliç Shipyard	
Şüheda	M/S Şehit İlker Karter	1450/1340	Vapur	1980	Haliç Shipyard	
Şüheda	M/S İstanbul-9	1450/1340	Vapur	1977	Haliç Shipyard	Formerly known as "Şehit Sami Akbulut"
Su	ŞH - Küçüksu	700/508	Double-ended	2015	Yalova	
Su	ŞH - Gümüşsu	700/508	Double-ended	2015	Yalova	
Su	ŞH - Göksu	700/508	Double-ended	2015	Yalova	
Su	ŞH - Durusu	700/508	Double-ended	2015	Yalova	
Panaromik	Sütlüce	600/453	Motor Boat	2009	İstanbul	
Panaromik	Kasımpaşa	600/453	Motor Boat	2009	İstanbul	
Panaromik	Hasköy	600/453	Motor Boat	2009	İstanbul	

== Gallery ==
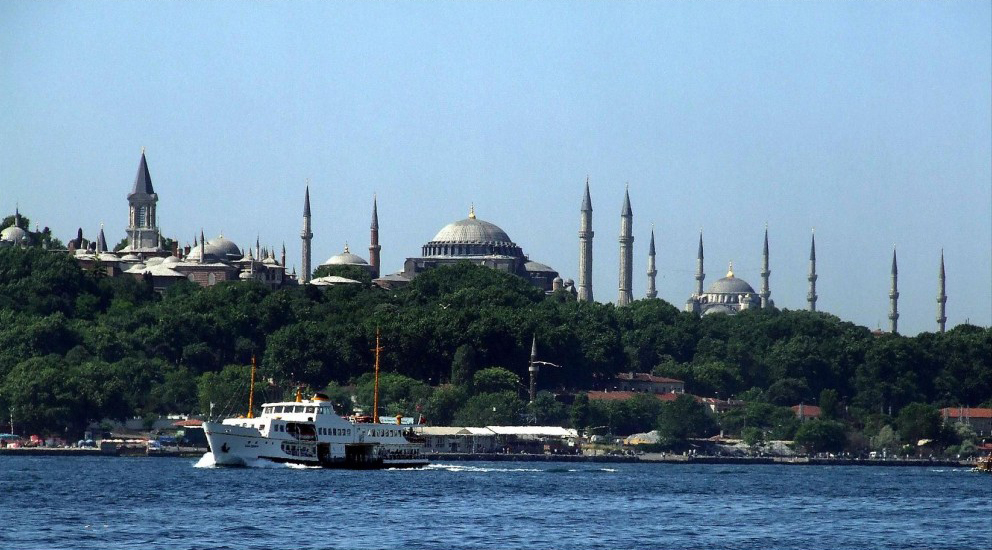
A Şehir Hatları 'vapur' with the Topkapı Palace, Hagia Sophia and the Blue Mosque in the background

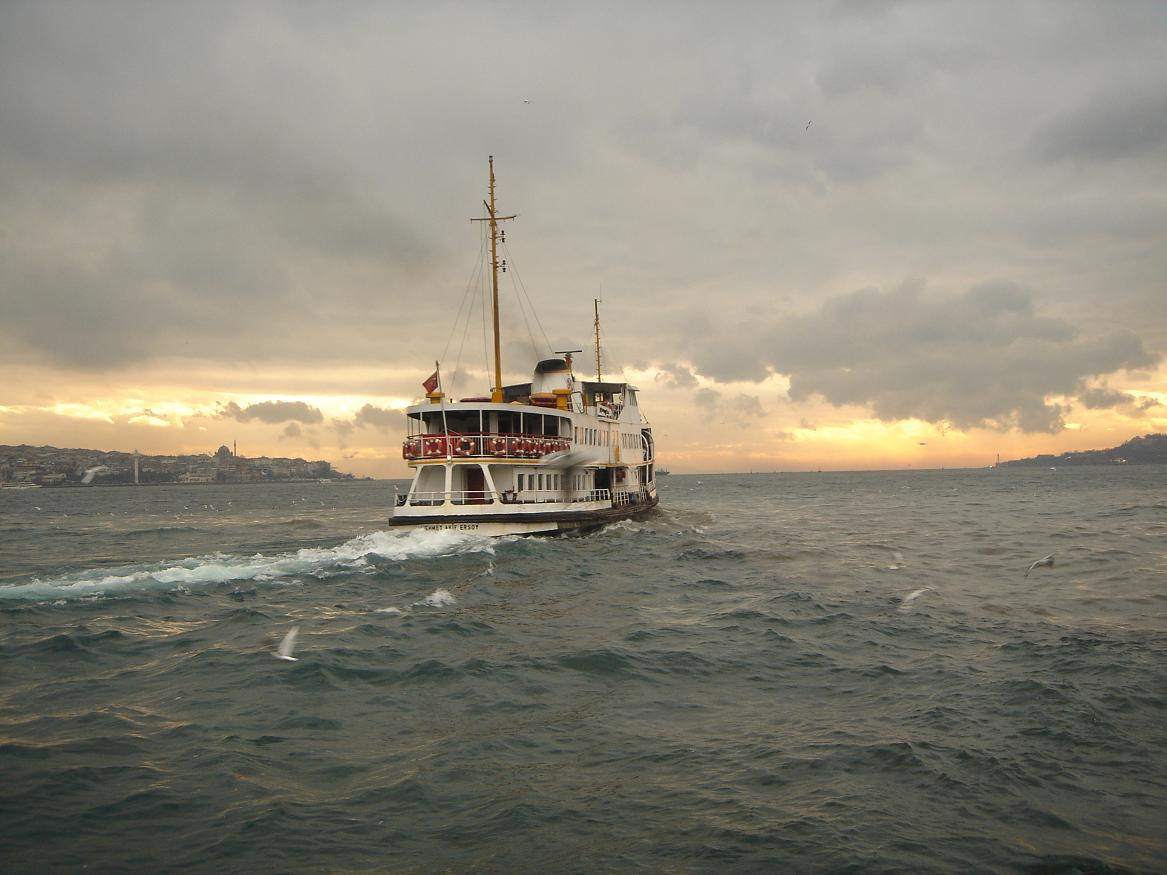
A Şehir Hatları 'vapur' in Istanbul

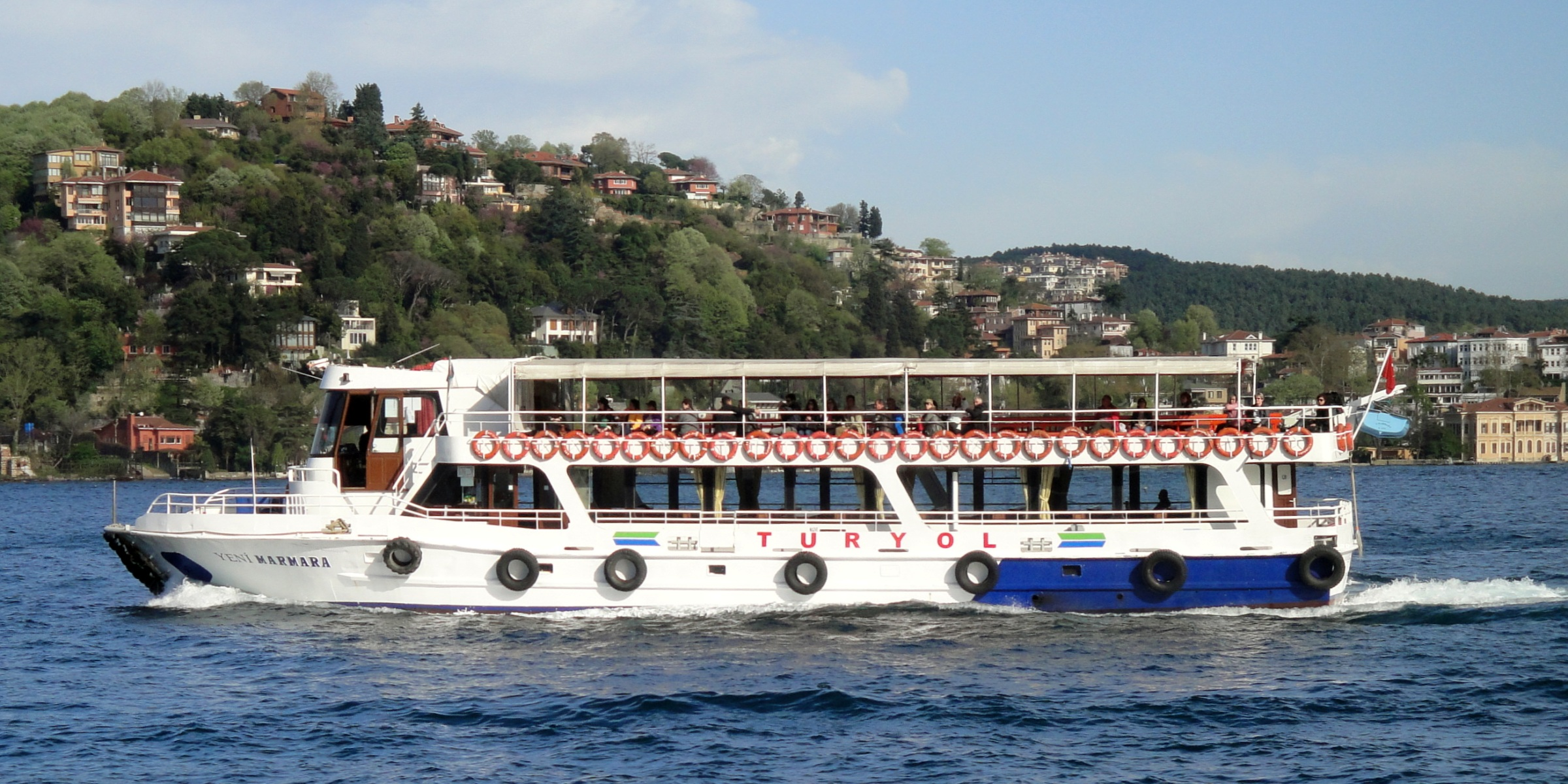
A Turyol ferry on the Bosporus

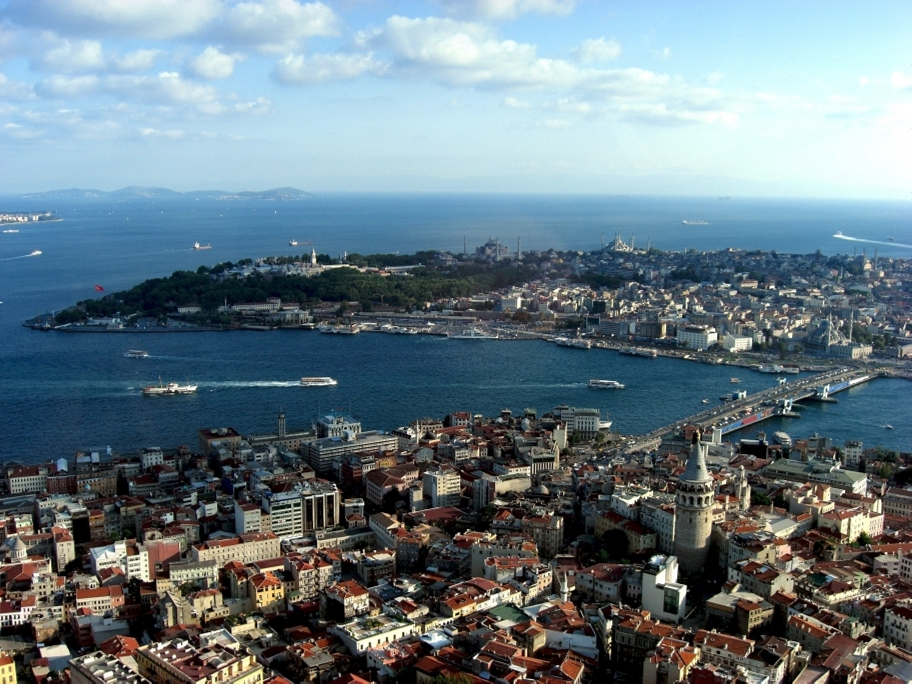
Istanbul: an aerial overview of the historical Sultanahmet and Galata district

== See also ==
- Public transport in Istanbul
- Istanbul nostalgic tramways
- Sabiha Gökçen airport
- Metrobus (Istanbul)
- Istanbul Airport
- Istanbul Metro
- Istanbul Tram
- Marmaray

== Additional sources ==
- Bryant, Steve (September 27, 2011). "EBRD Lends $150 Million To Buyers Of Istanbul Ferry Company". Bloomberg.
- "Souter's Turkish delight at big Istanbul ferry deal Focusing on the east reaps early dividend". The Herald (Scotland). April 9, 2011.
- "Istanbul Ferry Deal Finalised". TFI News. June 17, 2011.
