= Haydarpaşa suburban =

Former commuter rail service in Istanbul

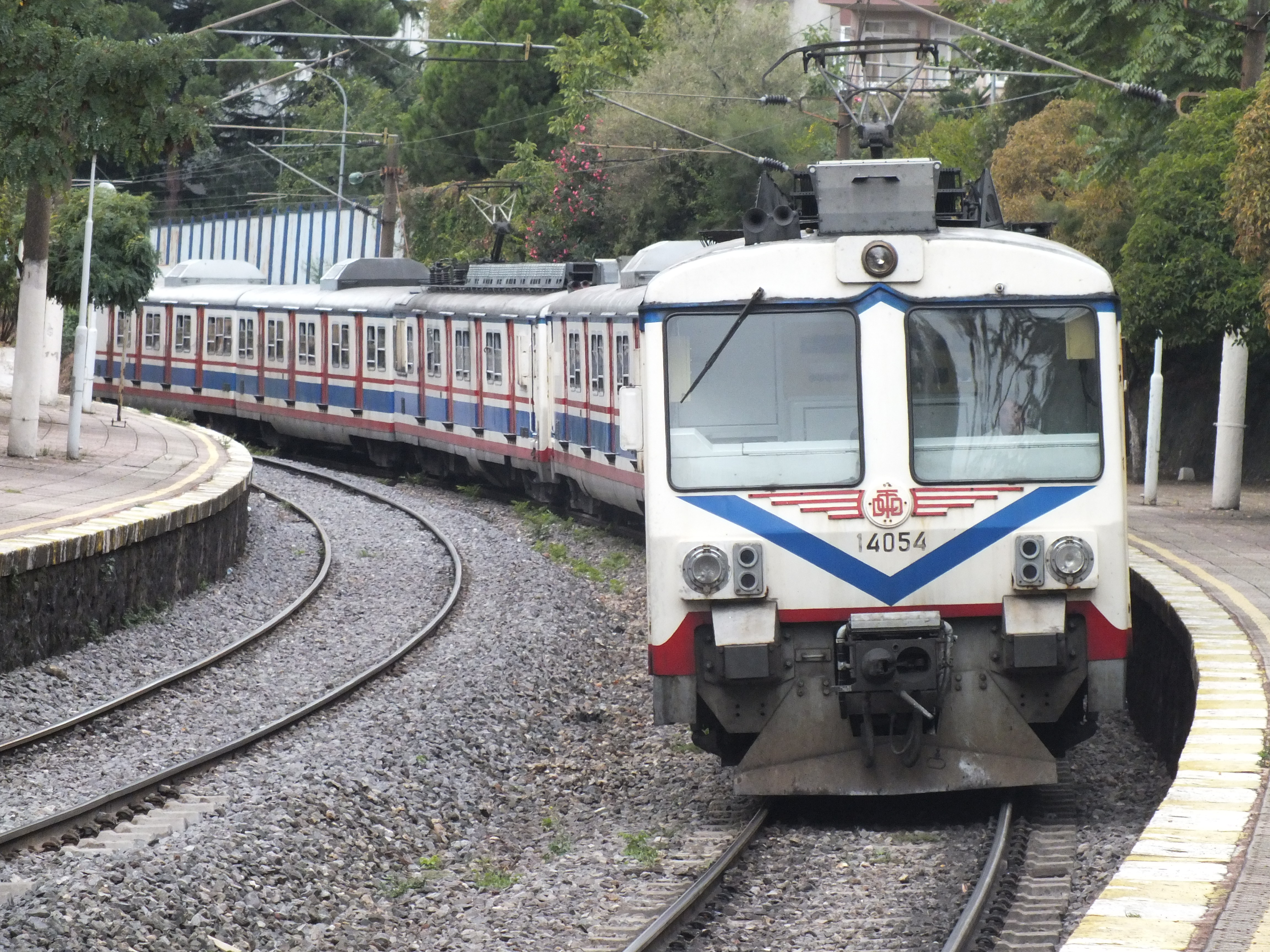
- A westbound train at Göztepe

Overview
- Status: Discontinued
- Owner: Turkish State Railways
- Locale: Istanbul, Turkey
- Termini: Haydarpaşa Terminal; Gebze
- Stations: 28

Service
- Type: Commuter rail
- Operator: Turkish State Railways
- Rolling stock: E23000, E14000 EMUs
- Daily ridership: 72,353 (2008)

History
- Opened: 29 May 1969
- Closed: 19 June 2013

Technical
- Line length: 44.1 kilometers (27.4 mi)
- Number of tracks: 2
- Track gauge: 4 ft 8 1/2 in (1,435 mm)
- Electrification: 25 kV AC
- Operating speed: 40 km/h (25 mph) average

The Haydarpaşa suburban (Turkish: Haydarpaşa banliyösü), also known as the Haydarpaşa-Gebze line (Turkish: Haydarpaşa-Gebze hattı) and formerly numbered as B2, was a commuter rail line operated by the Turkish State Railways, between Haydarpaşa Terminal in Kadıköy to Gebze. Since its opening in 1951, it was the busiest commuter rail line and busiest TCDD service in Turkey, until it was discontinued in 2013.

Electrified in 1969, the line was the second electrified commuter rail service in Turkey, after the Istanbul suburban, operating across the Bosphorus.

The route traversed the southern shore of Istanbul's Asian side, passing through important districts: Kadıköy, Maltepe, Kartal, Pendik and Tuzla. The line then crosses into the Kocaeli Province into Gebze, where it terminates. The State Railways has operated its regional service to Adapazarı and mainline service to Ankara on the line as well, making it one of the busiest rail lines in Turkey, in terms of passengers and number of trains.

== History ==
A railway to Gebze was originally built by the Ottoman Empire in 1873, as part of the railway to İzmit. This line was at first built for the Sultan, but later served the heavy population along the northeastern shores of the Sea of Marmara. However, few trains ran on the line during the time when the government operated it. The Ottoman government soon sold the line to a private enterprise, the Anatolian Railway (CFOA). The CFOA started regular train service between Istanbul and İzmit (as well as Gebze) in the 1890s. Service was suspended from 1914 to 1919 during the First World War. After the Republic of Turkey was formed in 1923, the CFOA continued to operate commuter service until 1927, when the Turkish State Railways acquired the CFOA. The newly formed State Railways (TCDD) continued the commuter service formerly provided by the CFOA.

After World War II, new locomotives and railcars were delivered to Turkey and used on the line. In 1962, new E8000 EMUs were ordered as part of TCDD's plans to upgrade the line. In the following years, the tracks were doubled and electrified, and the stations were all renovated. Beginning in late 1968, these EMUs started test runs on the line. On 29 May 1969 increased commuter service with the new EMUs began operation. In 1971, new E40000 electric locomotives started to operate on the line. In 1972, E14000 EMUs were introduced, and the E40000 were put on regional service between Istanbul and Adapazarı. The route however deteriorated for the next three decades and during the mid-2000s, the EMUs were in bad shape and the tracks were in need of repair.

In 2003, the Marmaray project started construction of a tunnel underneath the Bosphorus, as well as the upgrade to this line. Plans were finalized, and the line was first partially closed between Gebze and Pendik, with the whole line closed as of 19 June 2013 for at least 2 years. The planned reopening in June 2015 was delayed until March 2019 when the line went back into service despite protests from the unions that final tests had not yet been completed.

== Gallery ==
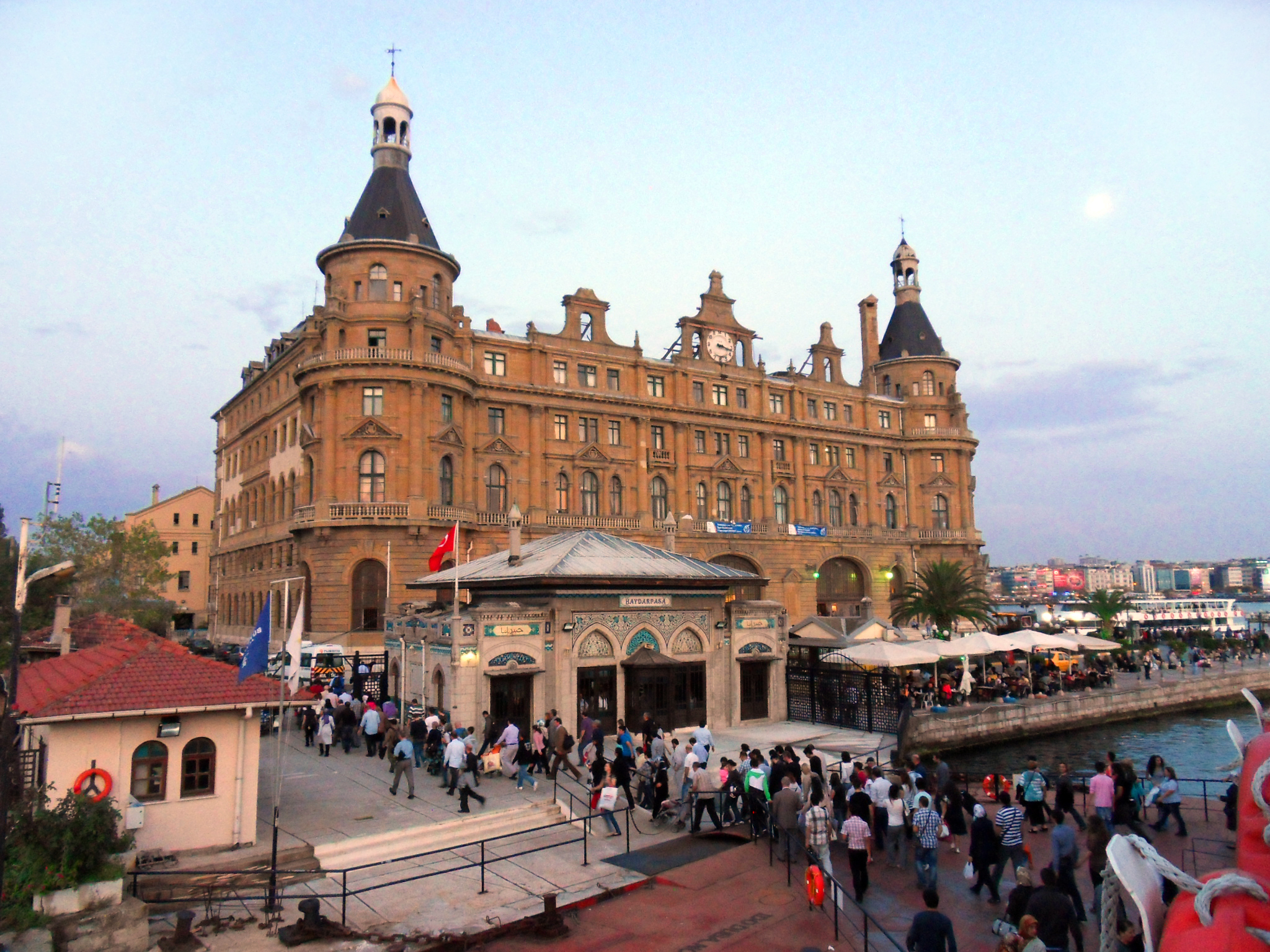
Starting point of the line: Haydarpaşa Terminus

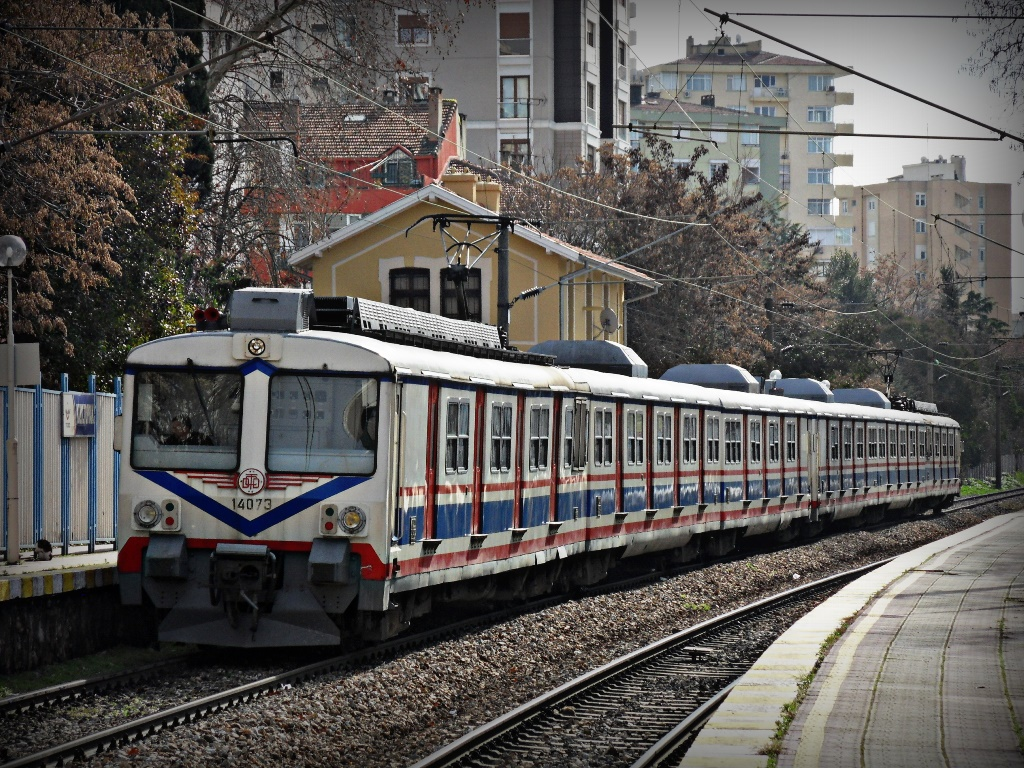
A westbound train at Kızıltoprak station.

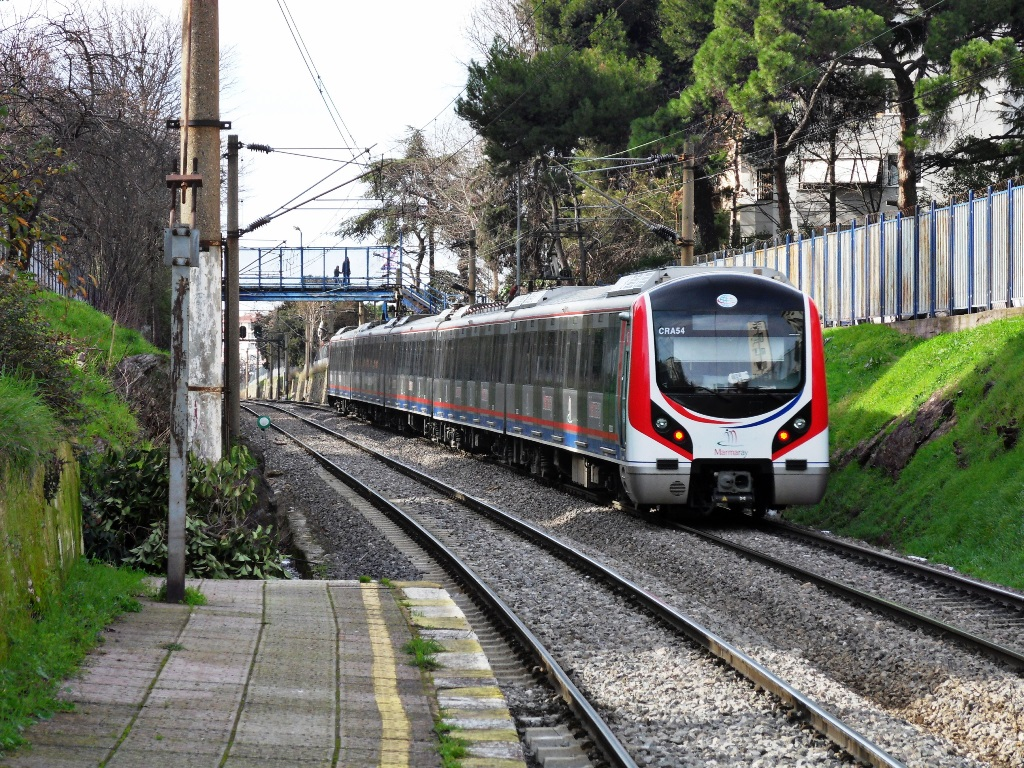
A westbound train consisting of E32000 EMUs used for Marmaray service

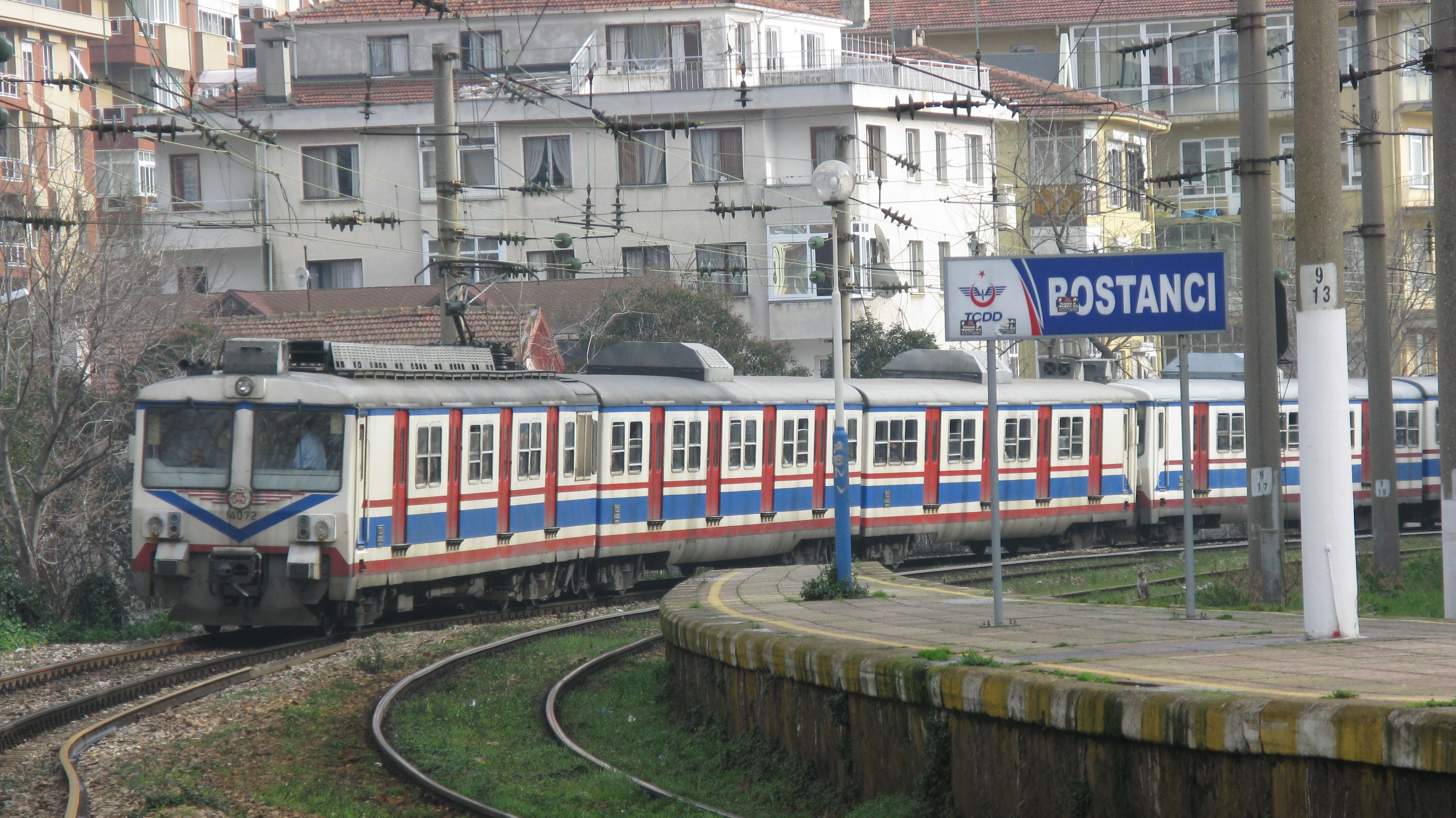
A TCDD E14000 arriving at Bostancı station

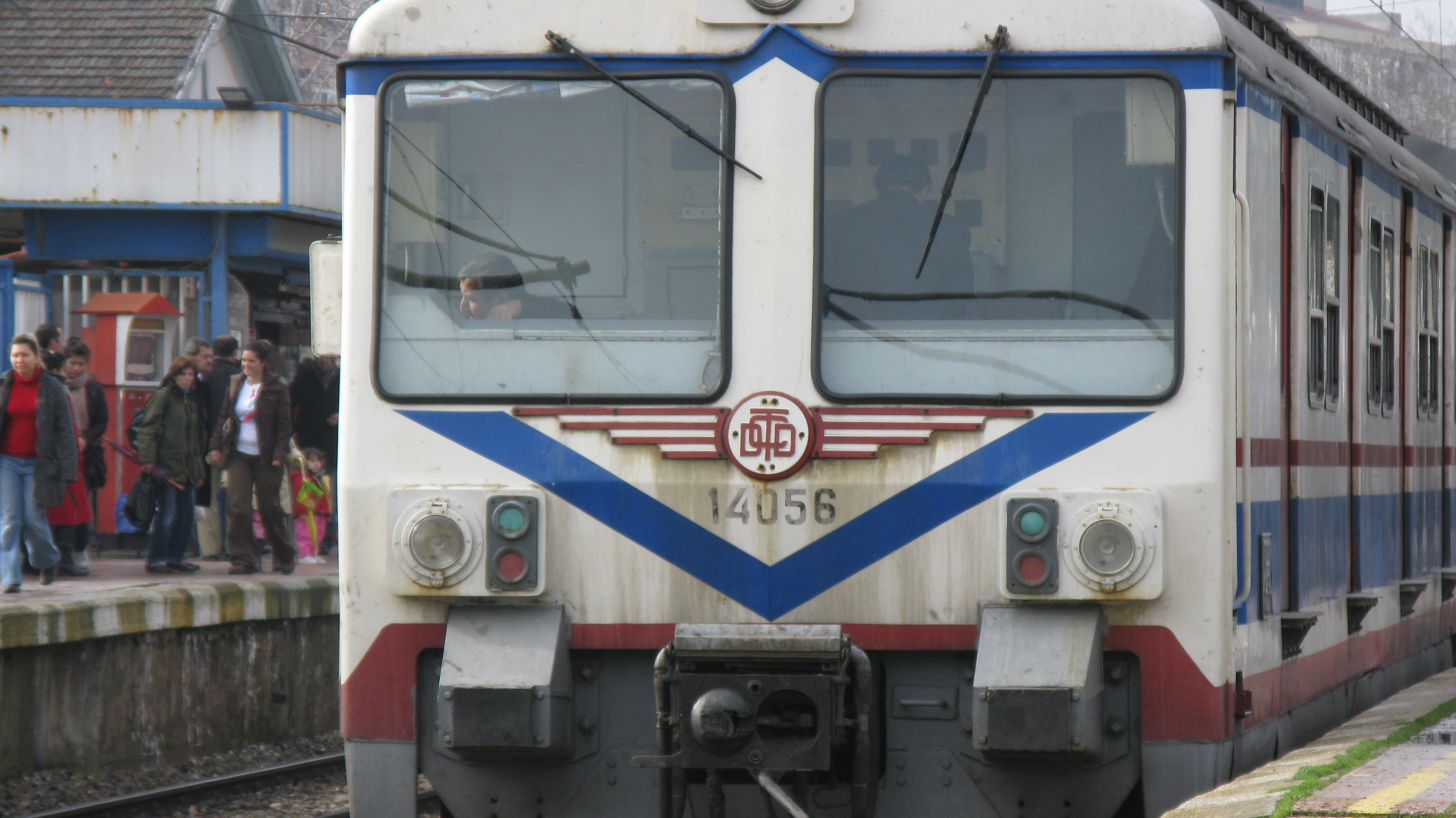
An old TCDD E1400 stock at old Bostancı station
