= TCDD E23000 =

Rolling stock class

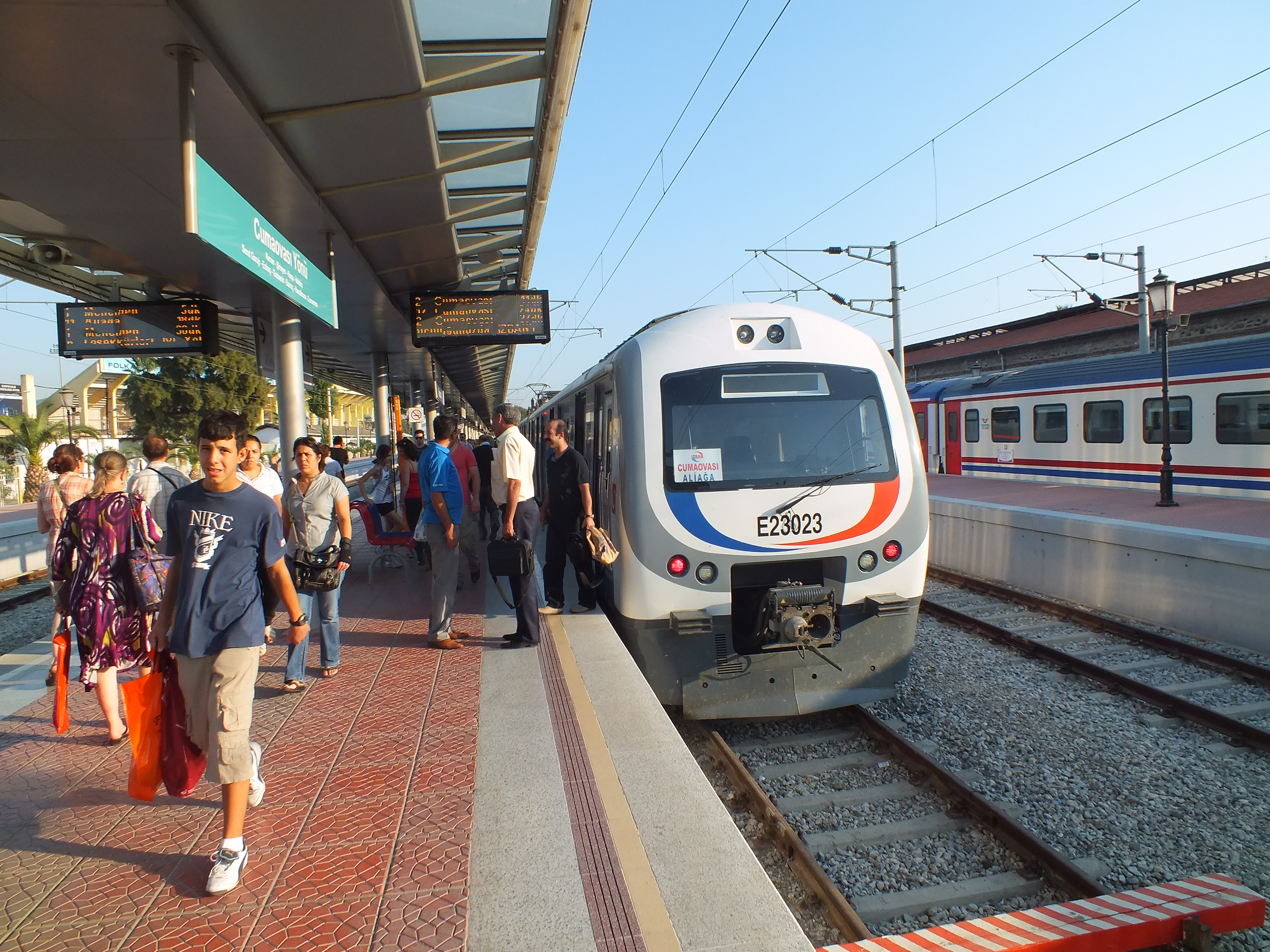
- E23023 at Alsancak station in İzmir.

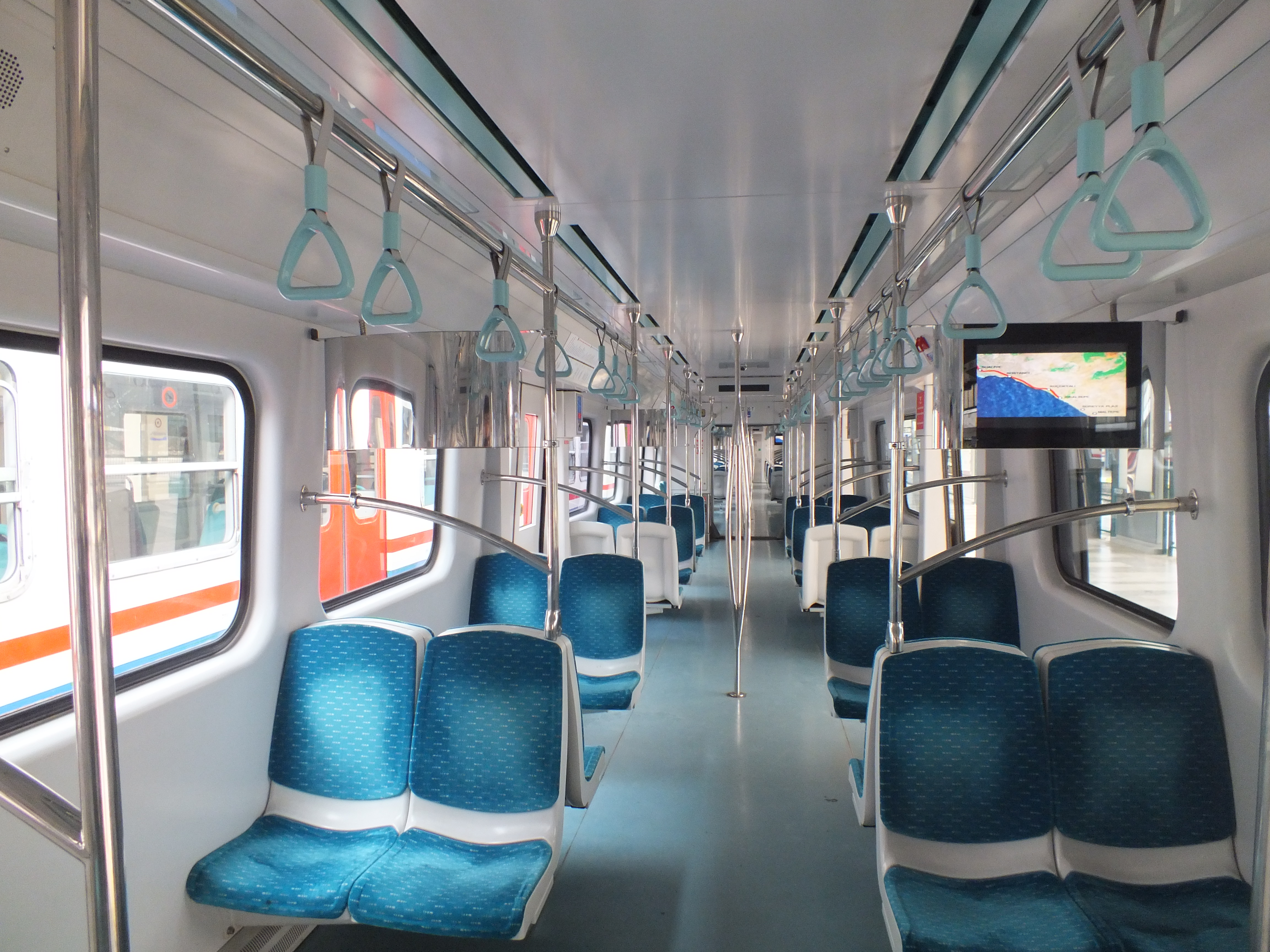
- The interior of a unit.
- In service: 2010–
- Manufacturer: Hyundai-Rotem
- Built at: Chagwon plant, South Korea; Adapazarı plant, Turkey
- Replaced: E8000; E14000
- Constructed: 2009–2010
- Entered service: 2010
- Number built: 32
- Number in service: 32
- Formation: 3-car EMU
- Fleet numbers: 23001-23032
- Capacity: 259
- Operator: TCDD Taşımacılık

Specifications
- Car length: 27.77 metres (91 ft 1 in)
- Width: 2.95 metres (9 ft 8 in)
- Height: 3.9 metres (12 ft 10 in)
- Floor height: 130 centimetres (4 ft 3 in)
- Platform height: 105 centimetres (3 ft 5 in)
- Power supply: Pantograph
- Electric system: 25 kV, 50 Hz AC
- Track gauge: 1,435 mm (4 ft 8 1/2 in)

The TCDD E23000 series are Electric Multiple Units that were built by Hyundai Rotem, with delivery beginning in 2009. The E23000s were built to replace the E8000 and E14000 EMUs. Each set has 3 permanently coupled cars.

They are operated by the Turkish State Railways for commuter service in Ankara and leased by İZBAN A.Ş. (10 EMUs) for commuter service in Izmir. After that all E22100 EMUs ordered by İZBAN A.Ş. will enter in service, these 10 sets will go back to Ankara.

These EMUs also operated in Istanbul (Sirkeci–Halkalı line and Haydarpaşa–Gebze line) before the closing of these lines for the construction of Marmaray. As E32000 plans are in place to use EMUs, on Marmaray, these sets won't be used in Istanbul any more.

== Gallery ==
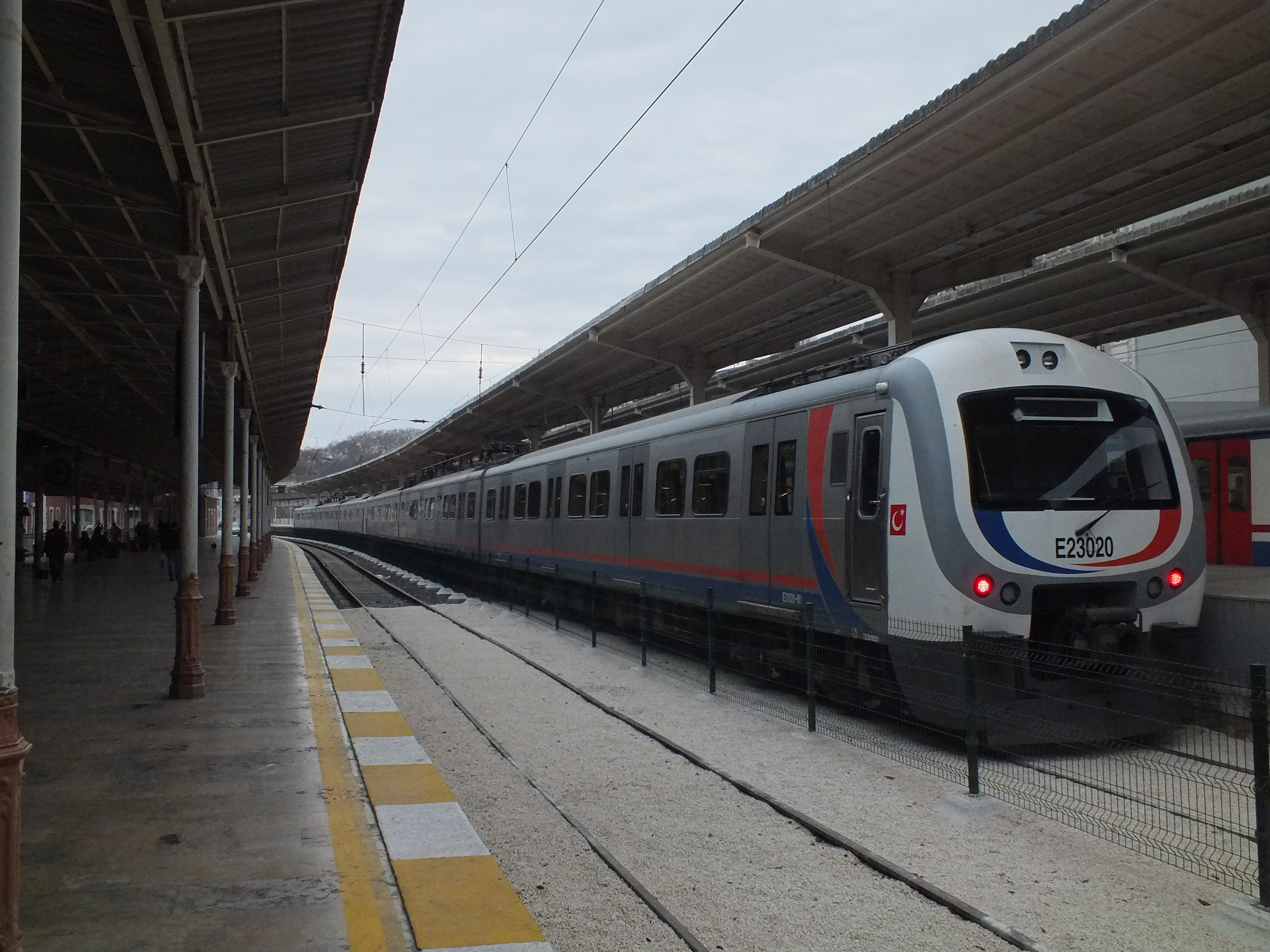
E23020 at Sirkeci station in 2011.

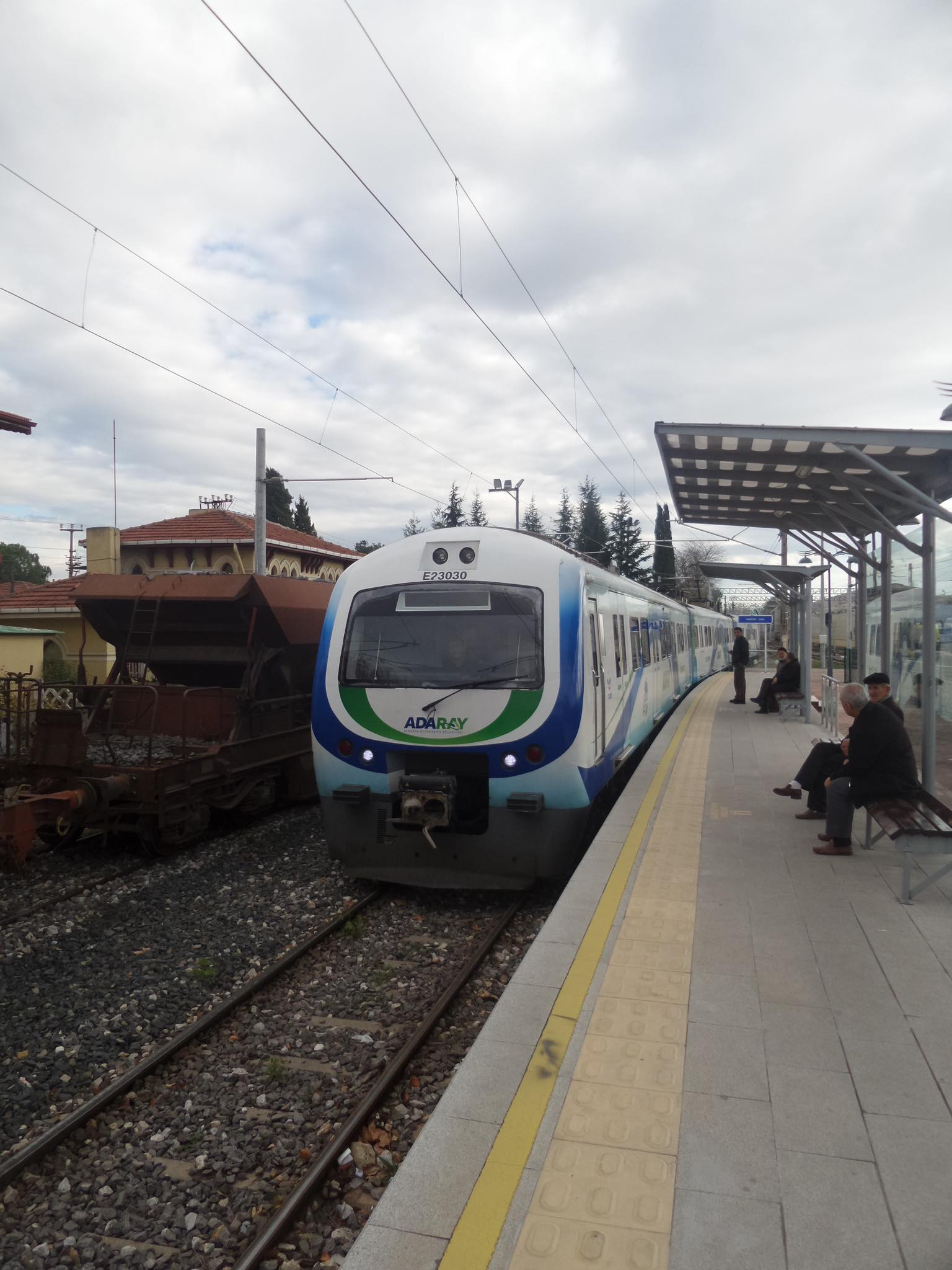
E23030 at Mithatpaşa station in Adapazarı

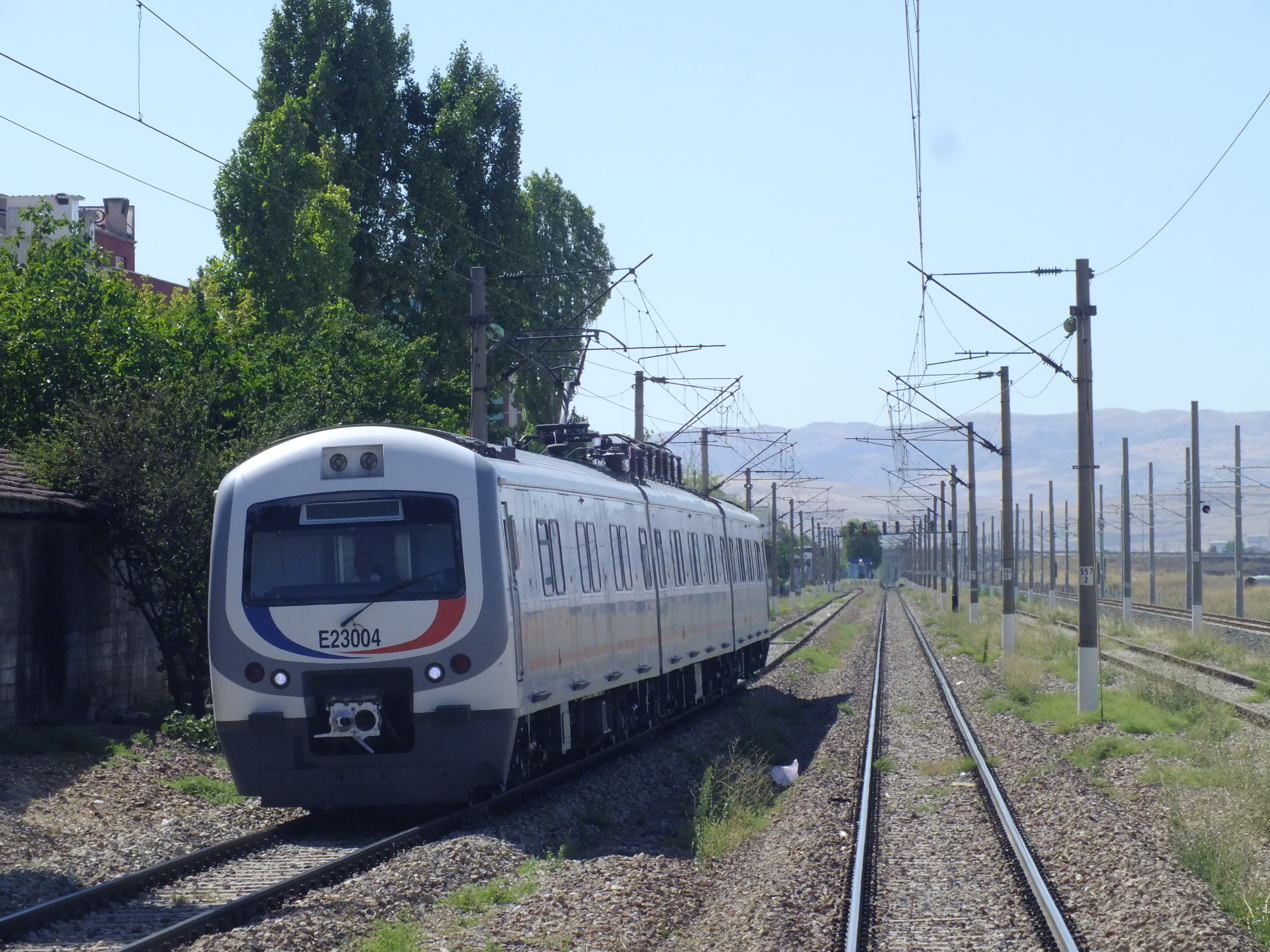
E23004 in Ankara
