= TCDD E 40000 =

TCDD E40000
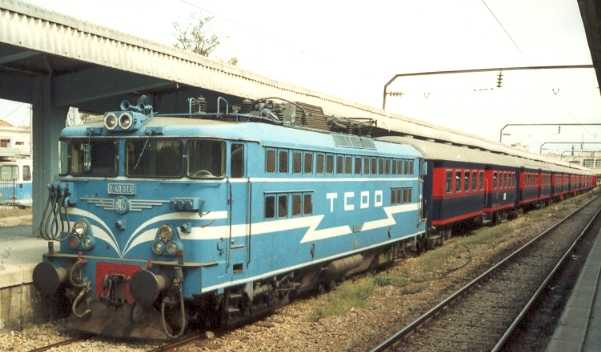
- E40 013 at the head of a eastbound Adapazarı Express regional train at Adapazarı in 2004.
Type and origin
- Power type: Electric
- Builder: Groupement 50 Hz
- Build date: 1969
- Total produced: 15
Specifications
- Configuration
  - AAR: B-B
  - UIC: B'B'
- Gauge: 1,435 mm (4 ft 8 1/2 in)
- Trucks: Monomotor
- Length: 14.94 m (49 ft 0 in)
- Loco weight: 79.4 tonnes (78.1 long tons; 87.5 short tons)
- Electric system/s: 25 kV 50 Hz AC Catenary
- Current pickup: Pantograph
Performance figures
- Maximum speed: 130 km/h (81 mph)
- Power output: 2,945 kW (3,950 hp)
Career
- Operators: Turkish State Railways
- Numbers: E40001 – E40015

TCDD E40000 series electric locomotives were electric locomotives used by TCDD.

None of the locomotives numbered E40001 – E40015 are in operation anymore. Three E40000 units remain operational but are not used unless deemed necessary.

The locomotives, which made their first run in Haydarpaşa in 1971, began suburban service in 1972 with the completion of the Ankara suburban electrification. The E40000s also took on the duty of hauling trains on the Kayaş–Ankara and Ankara–Kayaş lines, replacing steam locomotives coming from the east. Of these locomotives, the first 8 units were imported from France, while the other 7 were assembled in Haydarpaşa.

With a maximum speed of 90–130 km/h, the E40000 series eventually handed over their duties to the E14000 series suburban trains.
