= TCDD E 4000 =

TCDD E4000
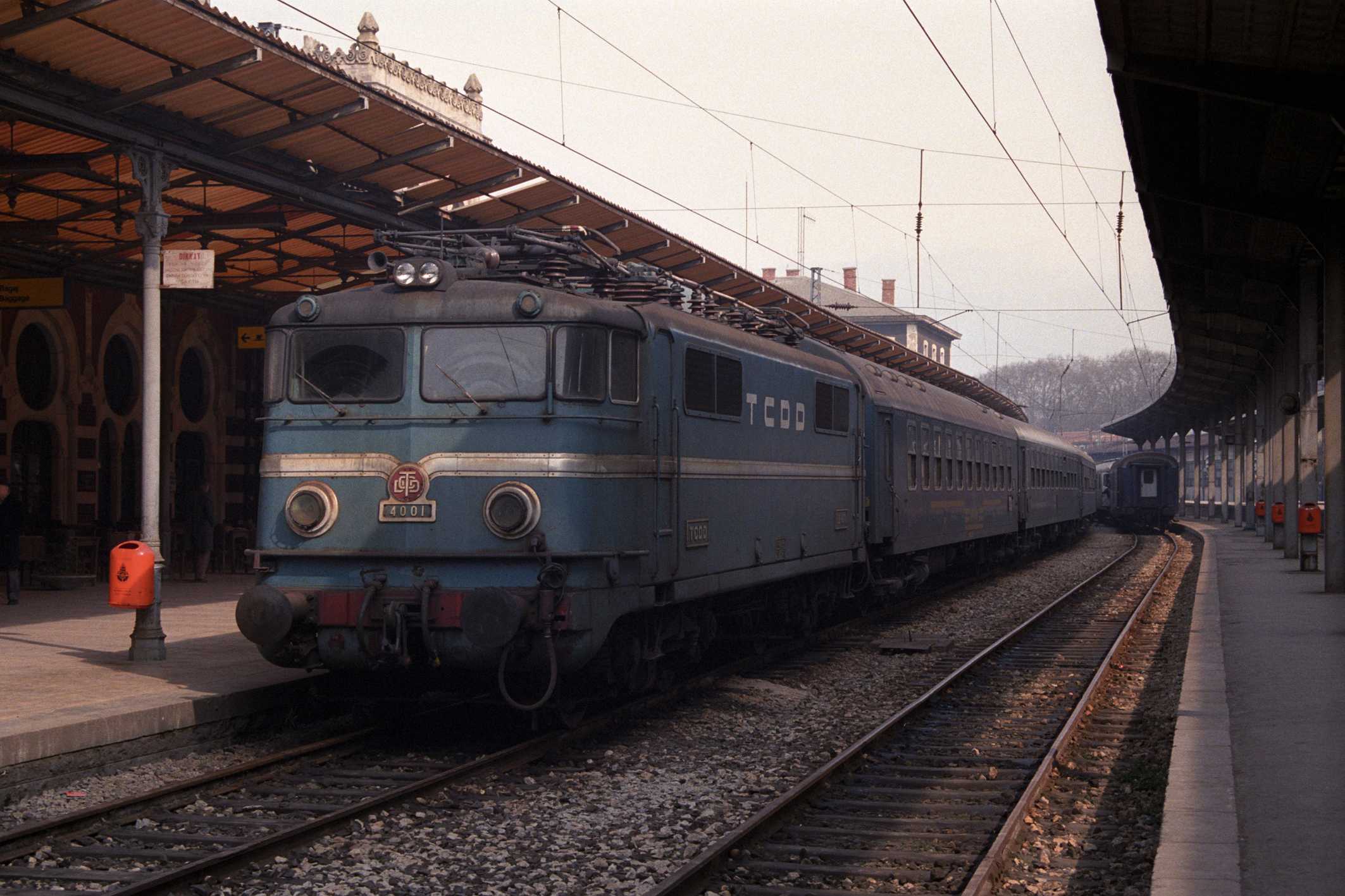
- E4001 at Sirkeci station, having just arrived with the Istanbul Express from Munich.
Type and origin
- Power type: Electric
- Builder: Alstom / Jeumont
- Build date: 1955
- Total produced: 3
Specifications
- Configuration
  - AAR: B-B
  - UIC: Bo'Bo'
- Gauge: 1,435 mm (4 ft 8 1/2 in)
- Length: 16.14 m (52 ft 11 in)
- Loco weight: 77.5 tonnes (76.3 long tons; 85.4 short tons)
- Electric system/s: 25 kV 50 Hz AC Catenary
- Current pickup: Pantograph
Performance figures
- Maximum speed: 90 km/h (56 mph)
- Power output: 1,620 kW (2,170 hp)
- Tractive effort: 95 kN (21,000 lbf)
Career
- Operators: Turkish State Railways
- Numbers: E4001 – E4003

TCDD E4000 was the first electric locomotive used by the Turkish State Railways, TCDD. The three units, numbered E4001 - E4003 were built by Alstom and Jeumont in France. The units are currently disused.

== History ==
In 1955 the first railway in Turkey was electrified, on the 28-kilometre (17 mi) commuter rail from Sirkeci to Halkalı in Istanbul. In addition to delivery of 18 electric multiple units, TCDD wanted to be able to use electrical engines instead of steam engines on long-haul trains on the last few kilometers into Istanbul.

Because the line the locomotives were to serve on was flat and did not allow high speeds, the E4000 was a simple and conservative locomotive, utilizing a direct, single phase AC motor fed directly from the transformer. But even by 1957 the development of rectifiers directly fed AC motors obsolete. The design of the locomotives are based on Paul Arzens of Alstom, and resemble many of the concurrent locomotives produced by them.
