= TCDD E14000 =

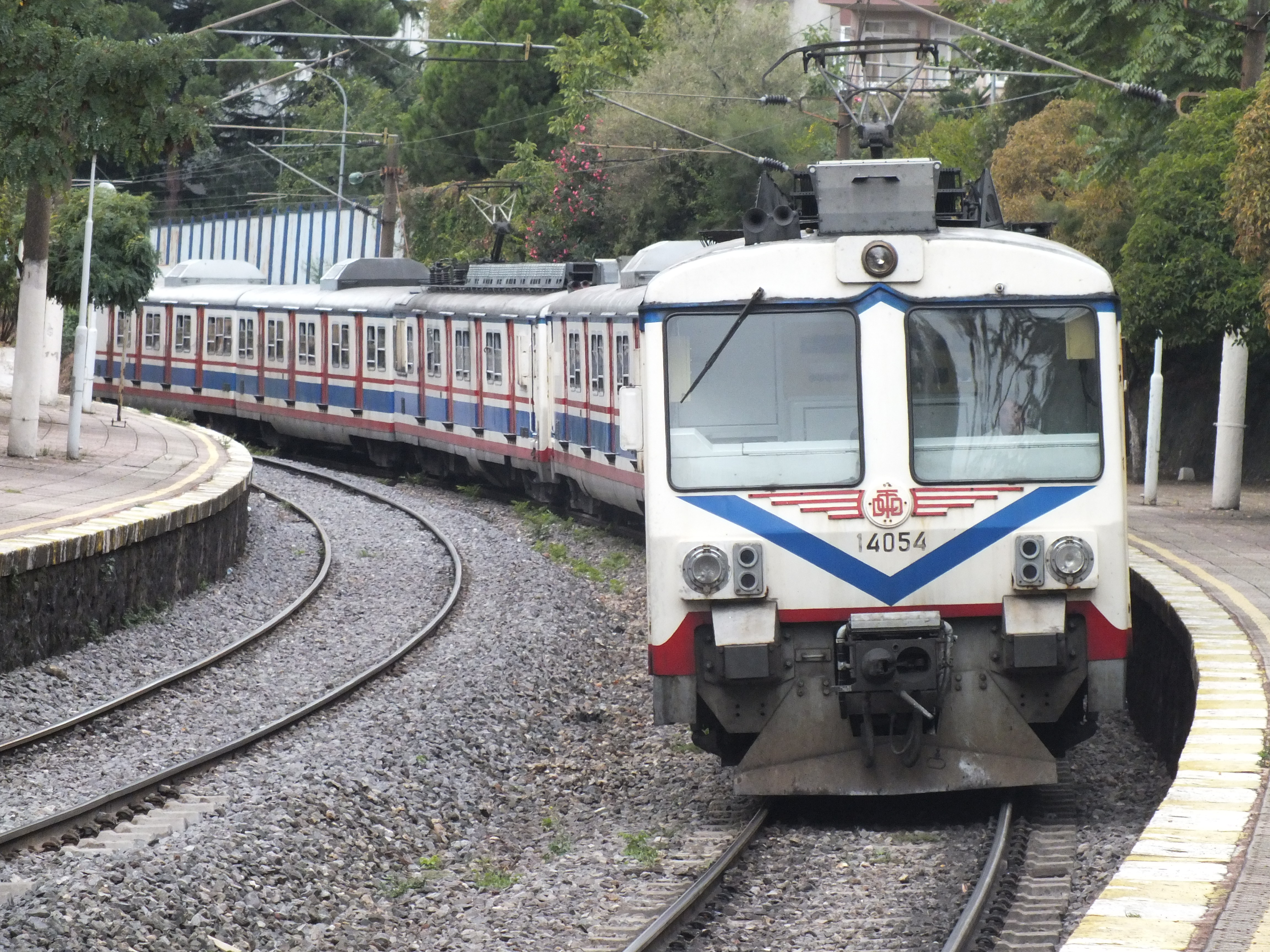
- E14054 at Göztepe, 2011
- Stock type: Electric multiple unit
- In service: 1979 – 2013
- Manufacturer: Tüvasaş
- Built at: Adapazarı Vagon Fabrikası
- Entered service: 1979-
- Scrapped: 2013-
- Number built: 75
- Number in service: 2 (modernized)
- Successor: TCDD E23000; TCDD E32000
- Fleet numbers: E14001 – E14075
- Operator: Turkish State Railways
- Depots: Haydarpaşa, Halkalı, Ankara, Adapazarı
- Line served: Commuter rail

Specifications
- Car body construction: steel
- Train length: 68 m (223 ft 1 3/16 in) (3 cars per set)
- Floor height: 120 centimetres (47 in)
- Entry: high floor
- Doors: 8 doors per car (4 on each side) / 24 per set (12 on each side)
- Maximum speed: 120 km/h
- Power output: 520 kW
- Transmission: coupled direct to traction serial motor
- Power supply: Overhead wire / Faveley pantograph (1 unit per set)
- Electric system: 25 kV 50 Hz AC
- Braking system: Wenn type - Air compressor service provided
- Track gauge: 1,435 mm (4 ft 8 1/2 in)

The TCDD E14000 was a series of electric multiple units produced by TÜVASAŞ under license from Alstom for the Turkish State Railways.

75 units entered service in 1979, operating on the Haydarpaşa–Gebze and Sirkeci–Halkalı suburban lines in Istanbul.

The trains were also used between 1979 and 2010 on the Sincan–Kayaş suburban line in Ankara (today known as Başkentray), and on the Ankara-Polatlı Regional service.

The units were withdrawn from service in 2013, when the old suburban lines were closed for renewal under the Marmaray project, as they had become heavily worn in their final years.

Of the series, units E14010 and E14025 were overhauled in 2019 and are currently used as regional trains between Eskişehir and Kütahya.

== Gallery ==
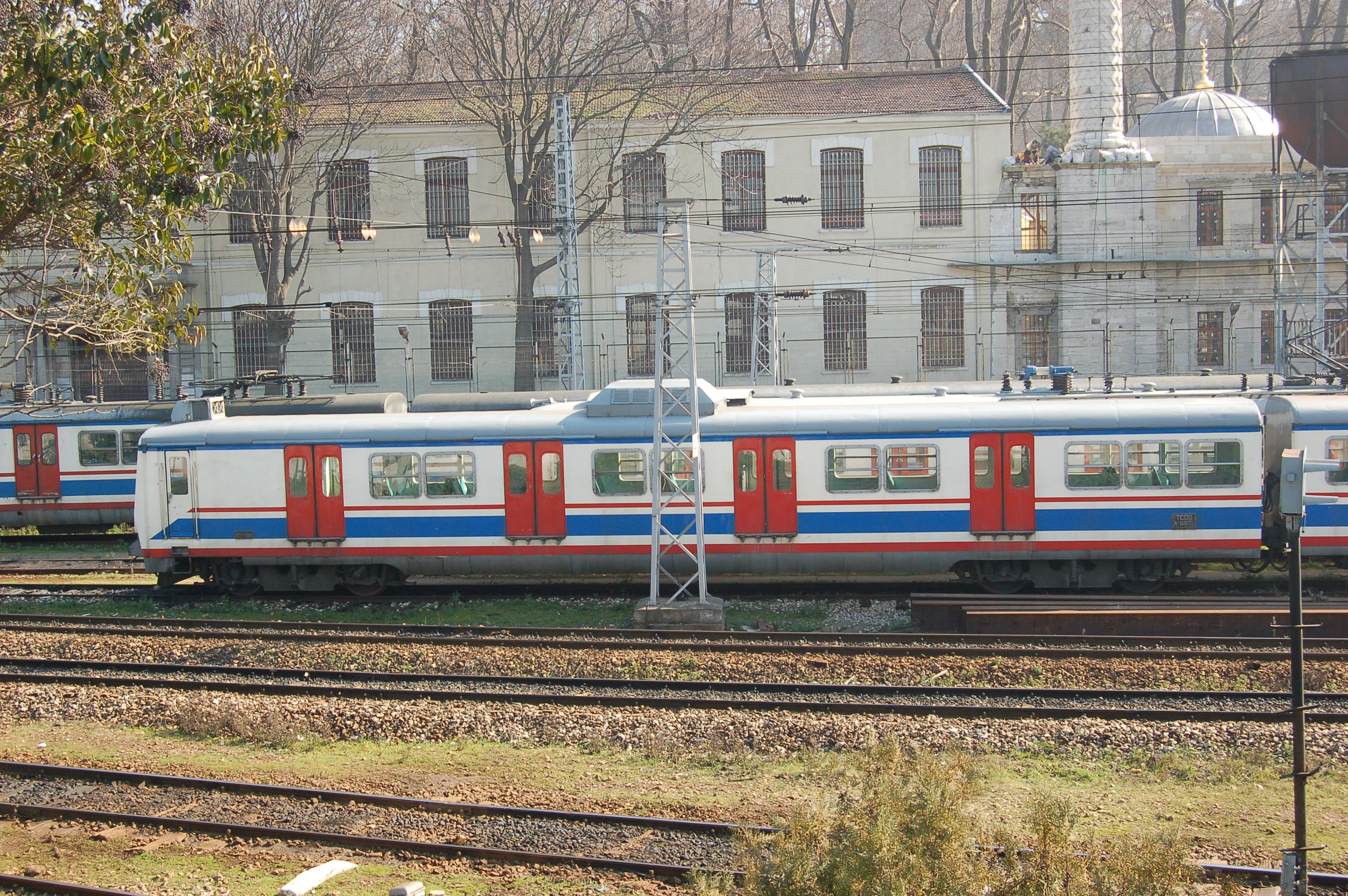
An E14000 set at Sirkeci station, 2008

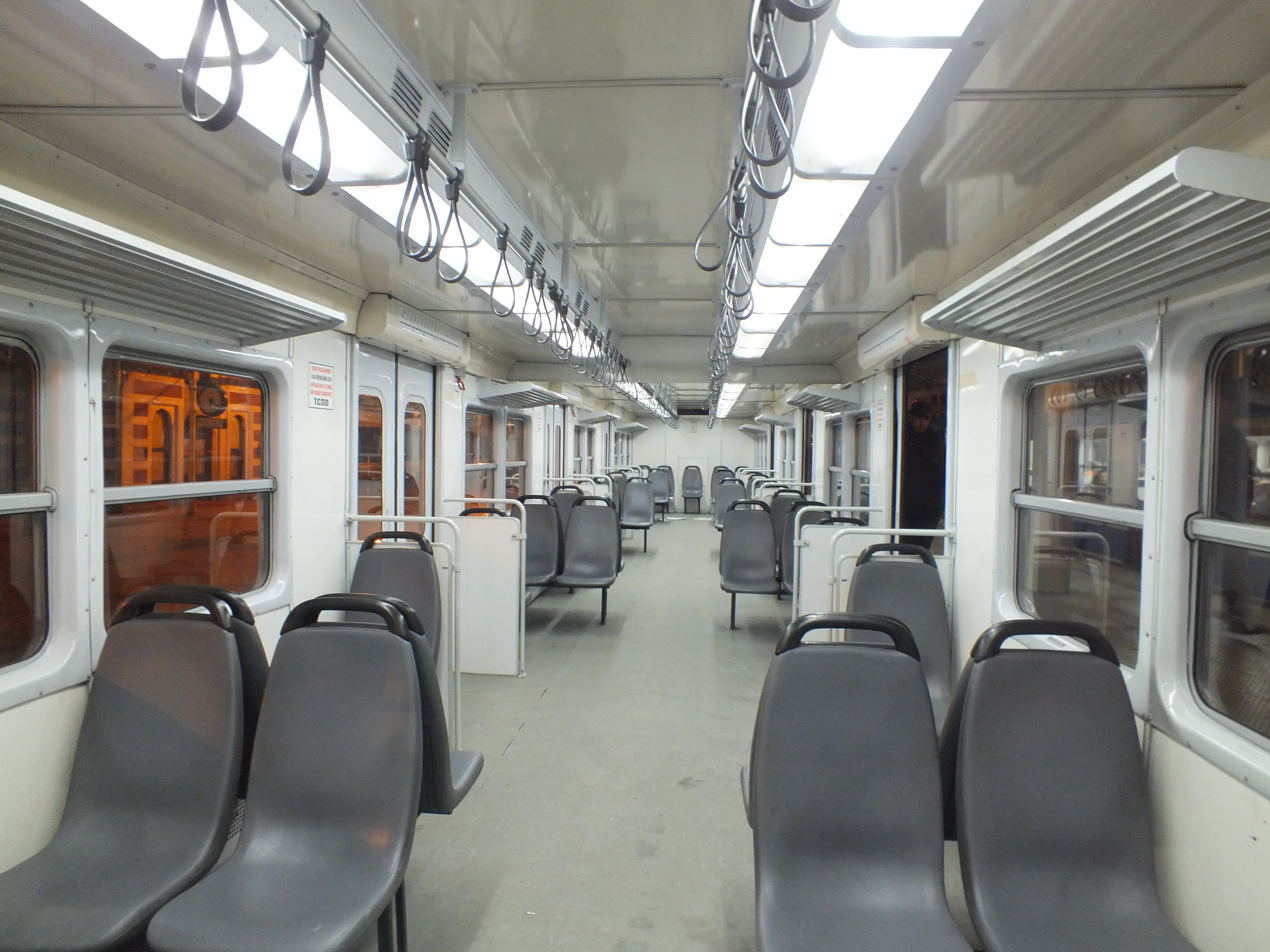
The interior of an E14000, 2011

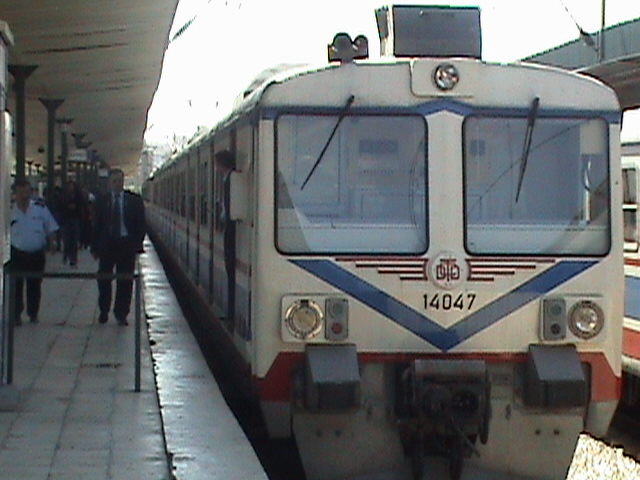
E14047 in Ankara, 2010
