= TCDD E32000 =

Hyundai-built Turkish electric multiple units

E32000 CRA EMUs
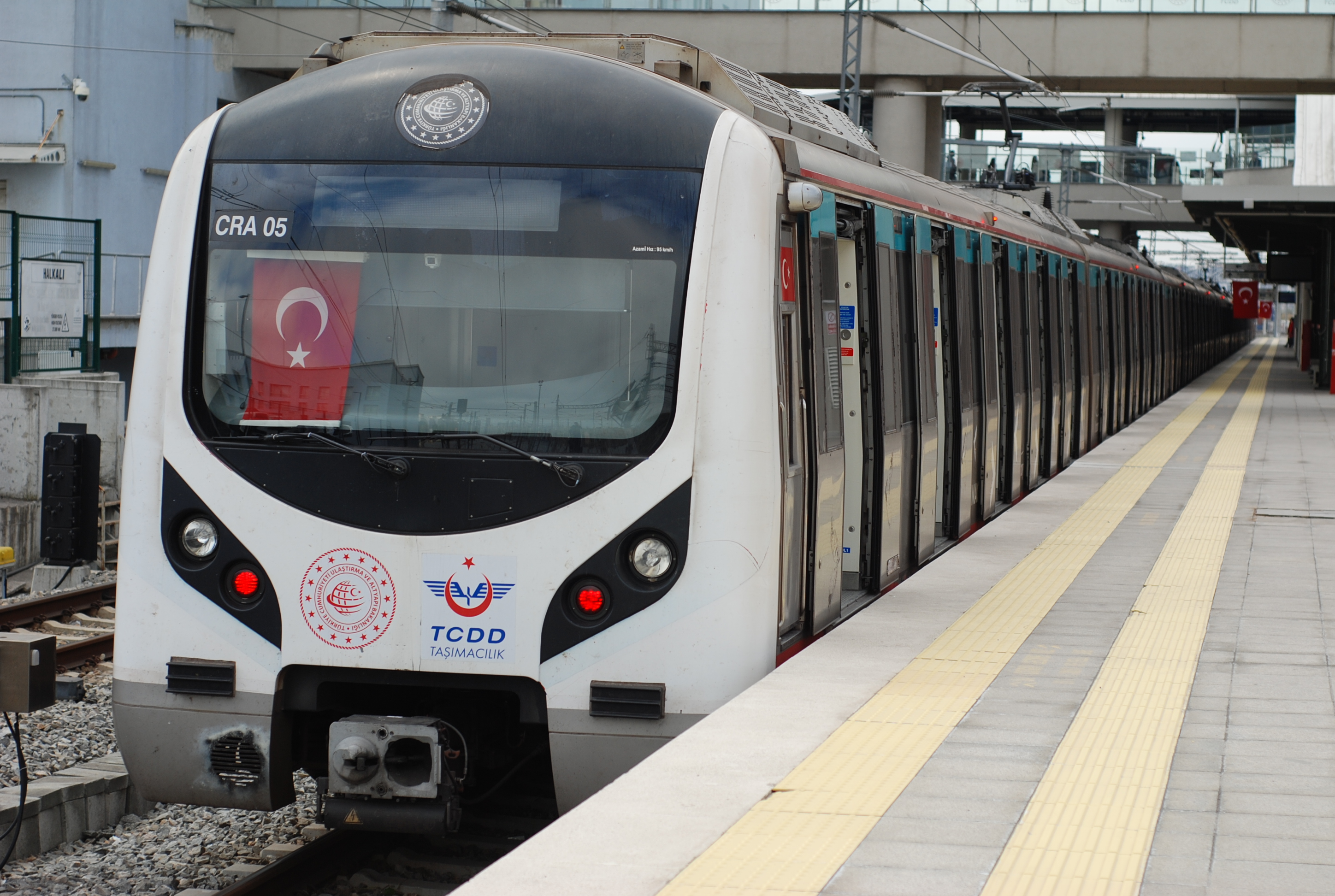
- A 10-car E32000 set at Halkalı, April 2025
- Stock type: Electric multiple unit
- In service: 2012–present
- Manufacturer: EUROTEM
- Family name: ICR
- Replaced: TCDD E8000; TCDD E14000
- Number built: 440
- Formation: 5 or 10 cars per train: 34 trains with 10 cars; 20 trains with 5 cars
- Operator: TCDD Taşımacılık

Specifications
- Car length: 22,500 mm (73 ft 10 in)
- Width: 3,010 mm (9 ft 10 1/2 in)
- Height: 3,850 mm (12 ft 7 5/8 in)
- Floor height: 1,050 mm (3 ft 5 1/4 in)
- Platform height: 1,050 mm (3 ft 5 1/4 in)
- Doors: 5 on each side per car
- Maximum speed: 105 km/h (65 mph)
- Electric system: 25 kV, 50 Hz AC, Overhead line
- Current collection: Pantograph
- Coupling system: Scharfenberg
- Multiple working: Yes
- Track gauge: 1,435 mm (4 ft 8 1/2 in) standard gauge

The TCDD E32000 is an electric multiple unit railway car built by Hyundai Rotem for the Turkish State Railways. They were ordered exclusively to operate along the Marmaray commuter rail network in Istanbul with delivery beginning in 2011. The EMUs consist of 5-car and 10-car sets respectively. The first EMUs went into service along Istanbul's two commuter rail lines from 2012 and 2013. On 29 October 2013, the first 5-car sets began operating between Kazlıçeşme and Ayrılıkçeşmesi as part of Phase I of the Marmaray project.

Hyundai Rotem announced on 11 November 2008, that it had signed a €580 million contract to supply the rolling stock for the Marmaray project. The Korean firm had competition from shortlisted bidders Alstom, CAF, and a consortium of Bombardier, Siemens, and Nurol for the 440-vehicle contract which was placed by the Ministry of Transport's General Directorate of Railways, Harbours, and Airports.

There is also an enlarged variant named TCDD E64000.
