= Turkish State Railways =

Turkish government-owned national railway company

State Railways of the Republic of Türkiye Türkiye Cumhuriyeti Devlet Demiryolları

- Map of the TCDD railway network as of 2023. TCDD owns and maintains all railway infrastructure in Turkey, while TCDD Transport owns and runs the trains.

Overview
- Headquarters: Ankara, Turkey
- Reporting mark: TCDD
- Locale: Turkey
- Dates of operation: 1929–present
- Predecessor: State Railways and Seaports Administration
- Successor: TCDD Transport (Railway operations only)

Technical
- Track gauge: 1,435 mm (4 ft 8 1/2 in) standard gauge
- Previous gauge: 1,520 mm (4 ft 11 27/32 in) Broad gauge (Sarıkamış-Gyumri); 750 mm (2 ft 5 1/2 in) Narrow gauge (Sarıkamış-Erzurum)
- Electrification: 25 kV, 50 Hz AC Overhead line
- Length: 12,532 kilometres (7,787 mi)

Other
- Website: www.tcdd.gov.tr

The Turkish State Railways (Turkish:Türkiye Cumhuriyeti Devlet Demiryolları), abbreviated as TCDD, is a government-owned national railway company responsible for the ownership and maintenance of railways in Turkey, as well as the planning and construction of new lines. TCDD was formed on 4 June 1929 as part of the nationalisation of railways in Turkey.

The Turkish State Railways owns and maintains all public railways in Turkey. This includes railway stations, ports, bridges and tunnels, yards and maintenance facilities. In 2016, TCDD controlled an active network of 12,532 km (7,787 mi) of railways, making it the 22nd-largest railway system in the world. Apart from railway infrastructure, TCDD also owns several rail transport companies within Turkey as well as a 50% share of the İzmir-area commuter rail system, İZBAN.

Prior to 2017, TCDD also operated all railways in Turkey. However, with the government taking steps to privatise some of the Turkish railway network, rolling stock and operations were handed over to TCDD Transport and TCDD formally ceased all railway operations on 31 December 2016.

== History ==
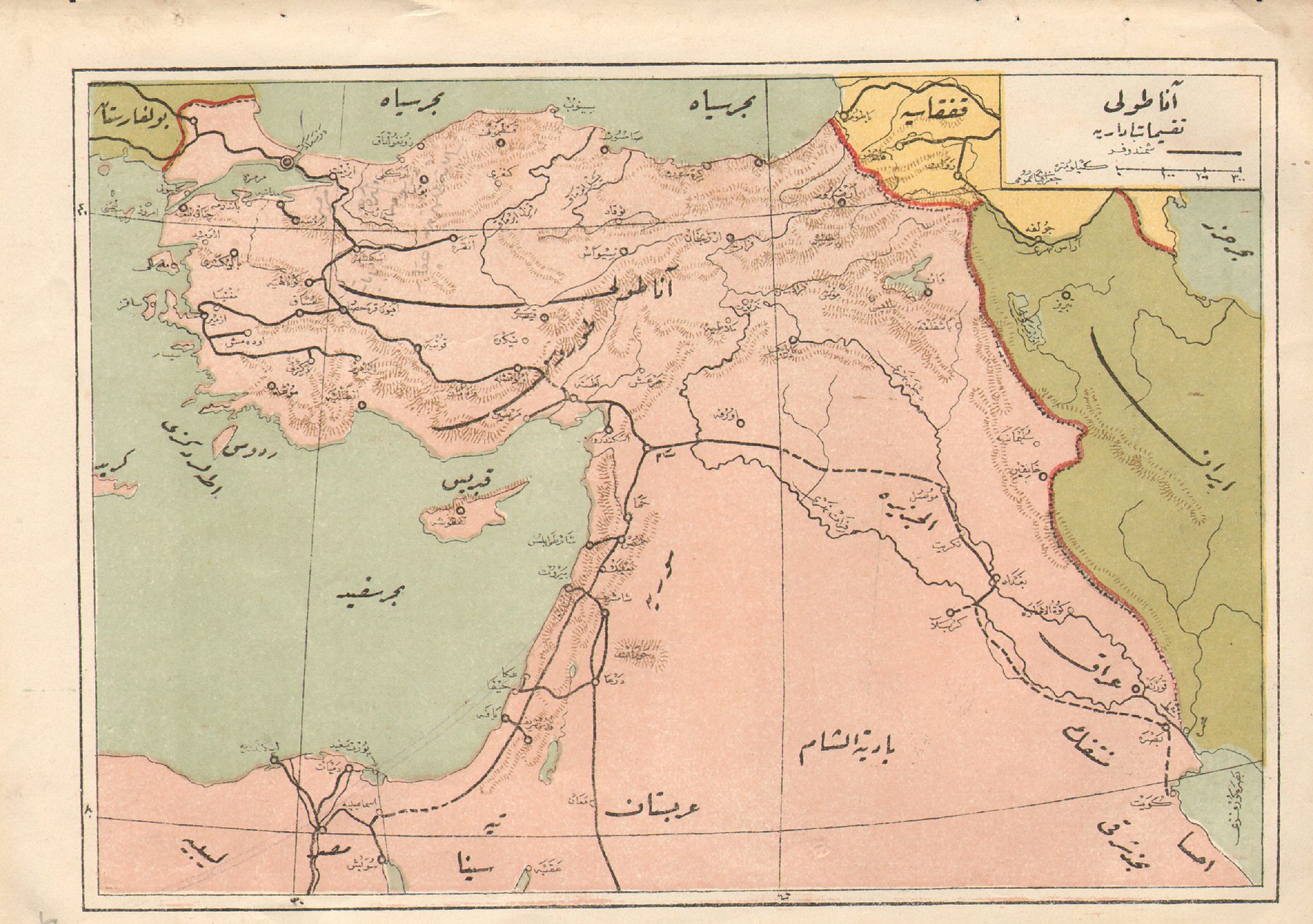
Map showing the Ottoman railways on the eve of World War I

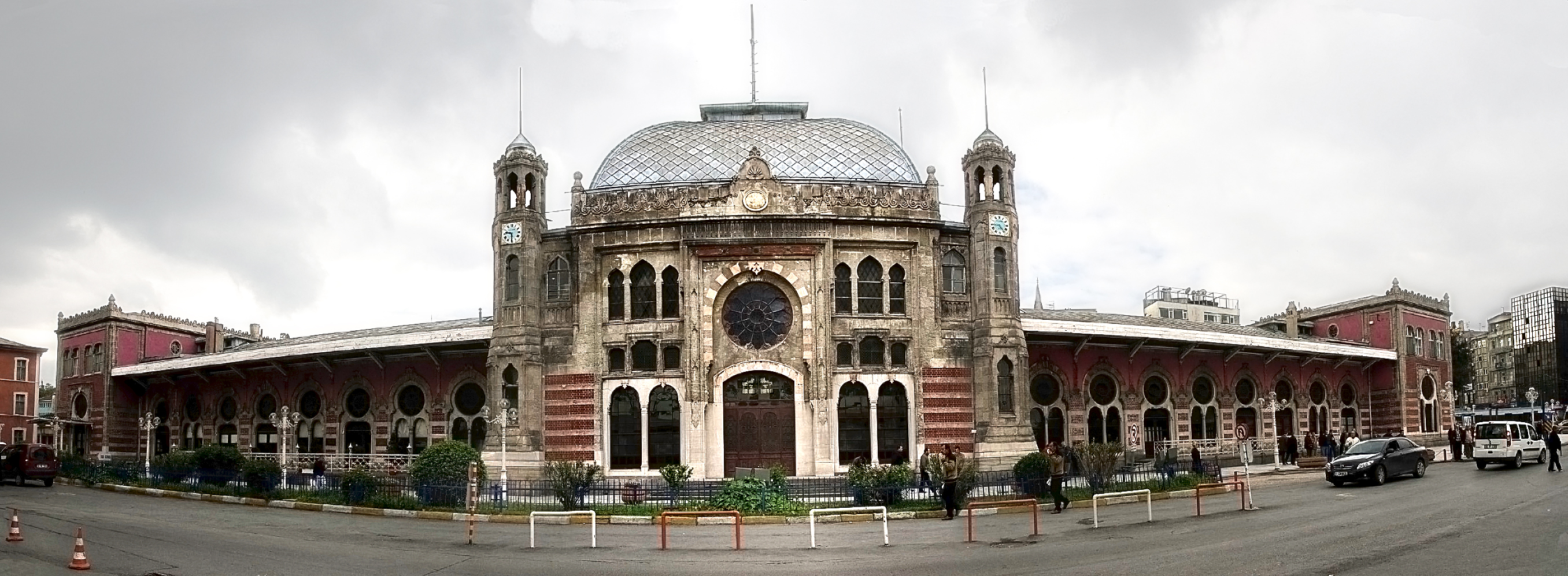
Istanbul Sirkeci Terminal opened in 1890 as the terminus of the Ottoman Empire's principal European railway line, serving also the famous Orient Express

Rail transport in Turkey began in 1856 with the start of construction of the 130 kilometres (81 mi) İzmir–Aydın Railway.

The state corporation that manages the Turkish railway system, Turkish State Railways, subdivides the history into the Pre-Republic period (Ottoman period), the Republic period (which extends from 1923 to 1950) and the period after 1950. During the first period, railways were built and operated by foreign concerns with permission from the state. In the second, the state took over its own railways and expanded them in support of Turkish financial interests. In the third period, attention turned from rail travel to highways, and the expansion of railways dramatically slowed.

Construction of the first railway line in Turkey began in 1856, being constructed by a British company that had gained permission from the Ottoman Empire. Later, French and German companies also constructed lines – the motivation was not only economic, the region had a strategically important position as a trade route between Europe and Asia.

As with other countries, rapid expansion followed; by 1922 over 8,000 km (4,971 mi) of lines had been constructed in the Ottoman Empire. At the birth of the Republic of Turkey in 1923, there were 3,660 km (2,274 mi) of standard gauge lines, of which 1,378 km (856 mi) were state-owned; while the lines owned by foreign investors were eventually nationalized starting from 1927. The railways were considered an essential part of the state by the government of the Republic, and continued to expand with new railway projects – over 3,000 km (1,864 mi) of new tracks were built in Turkey between 1923 and 1940. Railways were constructed serving mines, agriculture, people and ports; at the same time more lines serving eastern Anatolia were built, in their part helping to tie Turkey together as a functioning state.

In the years following World War II, the emphasis in transportation shifted to asphalt road and highway construction; it was not until the end of the 20th century that railways returned to favour with major passenger infrastructure projects being initiated, and five thousand kilometres of new lines planned for construction.

The line from the Iranian border to Van and across Lake Van to Tatvan was funded by the Central Treaty Organisation, before the Iranian Revolution.

High speed lines were constructed in the 21st century. The first high speed train ran in 2009. from the capital Ankara to Eskişehir.

Turkish State Railways (TCDD) was split with the passenger and freight operations being part of a new company named TCDD Transport from 2017, with TCDD left as a track and infrastructure operator.

== Operations ==
Türkiye Cumhuriyeti Devlet Demiryolları
- Type: Government-owned (100%)
- Industry: Railway company
- Founded: Ankara (1927)
- Headquarters: Ankara, Turkey
- Key people: İsa Apaydın
- Revenue: ▲2 billion ₺ (2015)
- Operating income: ▲1.26 billion ₺ (2014)
- Net income: ▲ −1.5 billion ₺ (2015)
- Owner: Republic of Turkey
- Number of employees: ▼29,829 (2014)
- Subsidiaries: İzmir Banliyö Anonim Şirketi
- Website: TCDD Official Website – Homepage (English/Turkish)

Turkish State Railways operated most trains in the country until the end of 2016. Intercity, regional, suburban, freight and most industrial lines are owned and operated by the State Railways. The only other railways in Turkey include İZBAN (TCDD holds 50% of the company's shares) which operates commuter rail service around İzmir and a few other industrial railways. In addition to rail services, TCDD has been responsible since 1927 for operating several major ports, which handle 30% of Turkish port activities.

=== Passenger operations ===
The Turkish State Railways operated passenger services on 90% of their system. These are intercity, regional, commuter and international services. In the railway's first year 52% of passenger travel in Turkey was by rail, despite the system lacking connections to many parts of the country. Rail transport was the main mode of transport for passengers in the following two decades, reaching an all-time high of 57% of passenger transport in 1947, but then started to decline after 1950, due to the mass construction of roads. Today, the passenger ratio is slowly increasing with the opening of high-speed rail lines in Turkey.

In 2019, almost 150 million people traveled by train in Turkey. 17.5 million on main lines, 8.3 million on high-speed lines (2% increase compared to 2018) and 124 million used the Marmaray commuter railway. The share of railway in domestic travels in 2013 is about 2.2%.

The types of passenger service are:

- High-speed (Hızlı Tren): High-speed rail services and TCDD's premier service.
- Mainline (Anahat): Intercity trains operating between major cities.
- International (Uluslararası): Trains operating on international routes, toward Europe or the Middle East.
- Regional (Bölgesel): Trains operating within their respective districts.
- Commuter (Banliyö): Commuter trains, currently operating in Ankara and Istanbul.

==== High-speed services ====
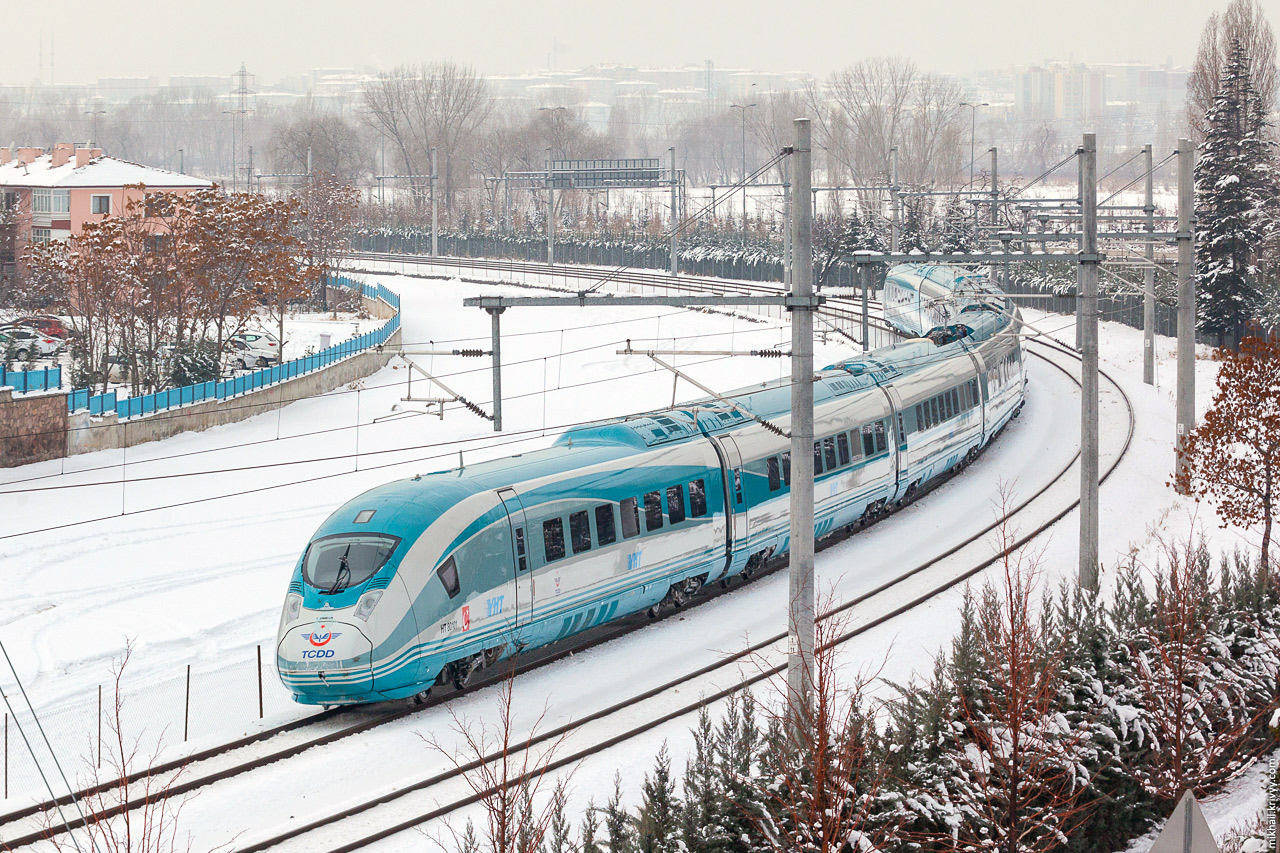
A TCDD HT80000 (Siemens Velaro TR) high-speed train (YHT) in Ankara

High-speed rail in Turkey began service in 2009. TCDD has branded its high-speed service as Yüksek Hızlı Tren or YHT, directly translating to High-Speed Train, dubbed after the trains' capacity to reach 250 km/h (and in some advanced sections of the Ankara-Konya railroad up to 300 km/h). There had been previously tried but failed accelerated train projects, i.e. higher speed rail without the necessary upgrades on the railroad tracks, causing a number of accidents and ending up with losses incurred by TCDD in the early 2000s. YHT, in stark contrast, became a commercially successful, safe and cheap alternative to Flights and Roads, cutting the travel time between the city centers of two largest cities of the country up to 4 hours. Currently, YHT trains operate 22 daily trips based from its central hub in Ankara, in addition to more trips on the Istanbul–Konya high-speed railway that bypass Ankara.

YHT currently operates on two main lines: the Ankara–Istanbul high-speed railway, and Ankara–Konya high-speed railway. In total, these lines connect 8 provincial capitals out of 81 Provinces in Turkey, namely Adapazarı (via Arifli), Ankara, Bilecik, Eskişehir, Istanbul, İzmit, Karaman and Konya. There are currently ongoing construction projects aiming to link up at least 6 more provincial capitals, including third and fourth largest cities of the country İzmir and Bursa, besides Afyonkarahisar, Edirne, Kayseri, Sivas and other potential cities. Further ambitions at the planning stage eventually aim to link up East and West points of the country through high-speed railways and act as an international High-speed railway bridge across Europe and Asia

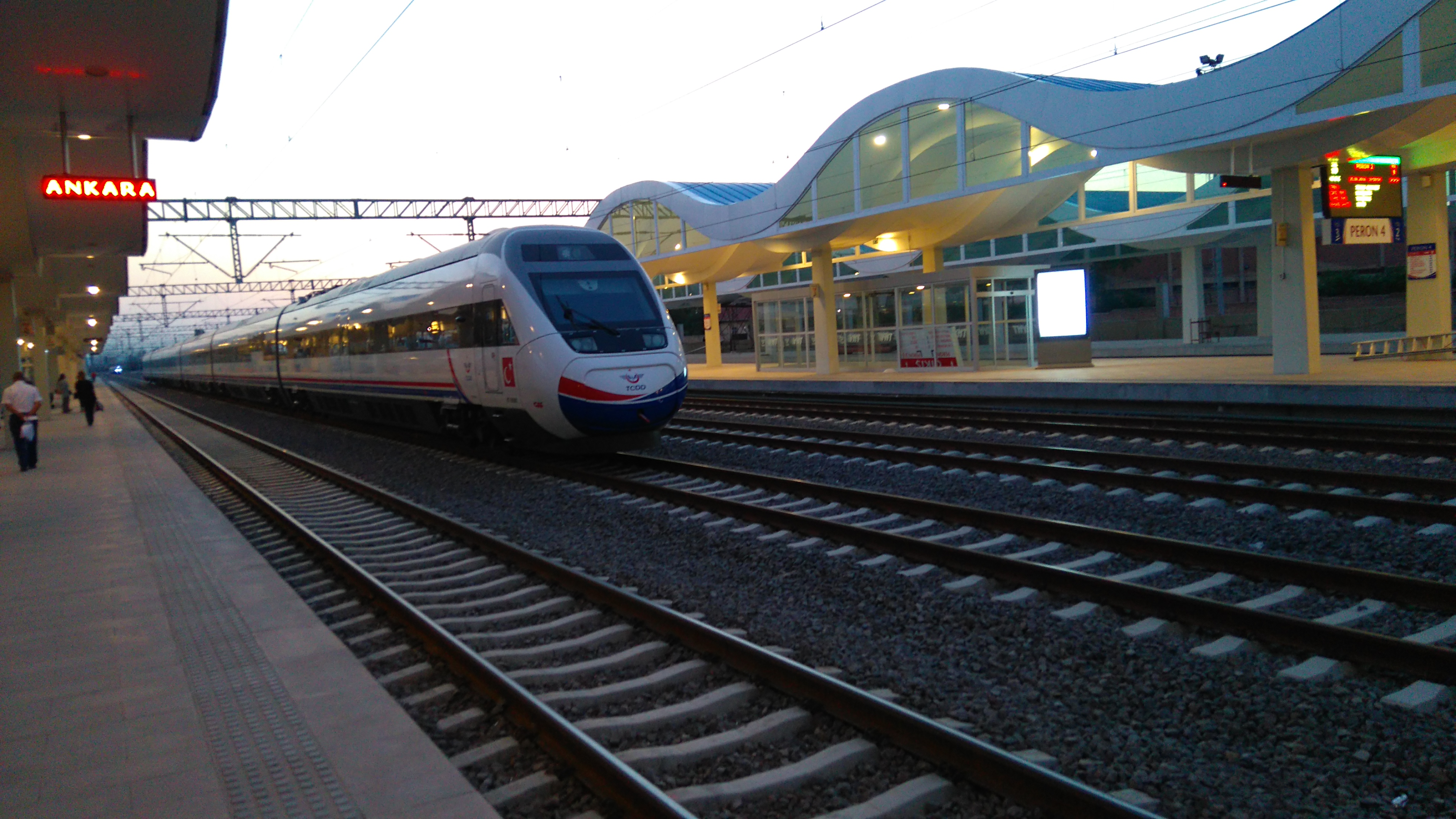
A TCDD HT65000 in Eskişehir

On 13 March 2009, the first phase of the Ankara–Istanbul high-speed railway entered service between Ankara and Eskişehir. On 25 July 2014, the Ankara-Istanbul high-speed line services began to reach the Pendik railway station on the Asian side of Istanbul, and on 13 March 2019 the services began to reach the Halkalı railway station on the European side of Istanbul, passing through the Marmaray railway tunnel under the Bosphorus strait. There were initially 6 daily departures in both directions.

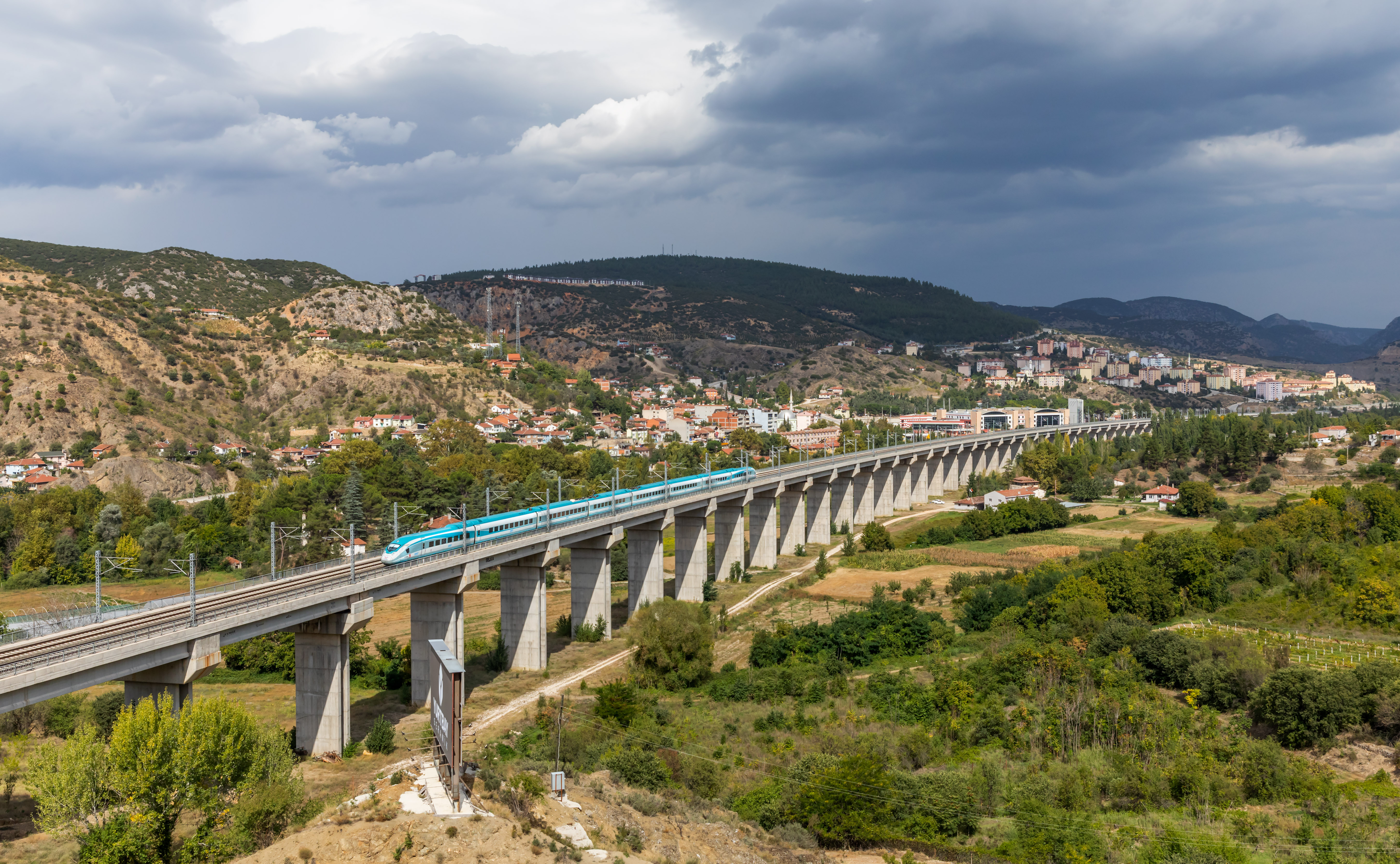
A TCDD HT80000 high-speed train (Siemens Velaro) traveling from Ankara to Istanbul in Bilecik, Türkiye

On 23 August 2011, the YHT service on the Ankara–Konya high-speed railway was inaugurated. The Konya-Ankara line was later connected with the Istanbul–Ankara line at the Polatlı district of Ankara Province on 23 March 2013, essentially bypassing the city of Ankara and shortening the distance from Istanbul to Konya to 5 hours. Most recently on 8 January 2022, the Konya line was extended into another provincial capital, Karaman.

High-speed rail in Turkey is still developing, with new lines currently under construction or in the planning phase. By 2023, the Ministry of Transport and Infrastructure expects Turkey's high-speed rail system to increase to 10,000 kilometers.

==== Mainline services ====
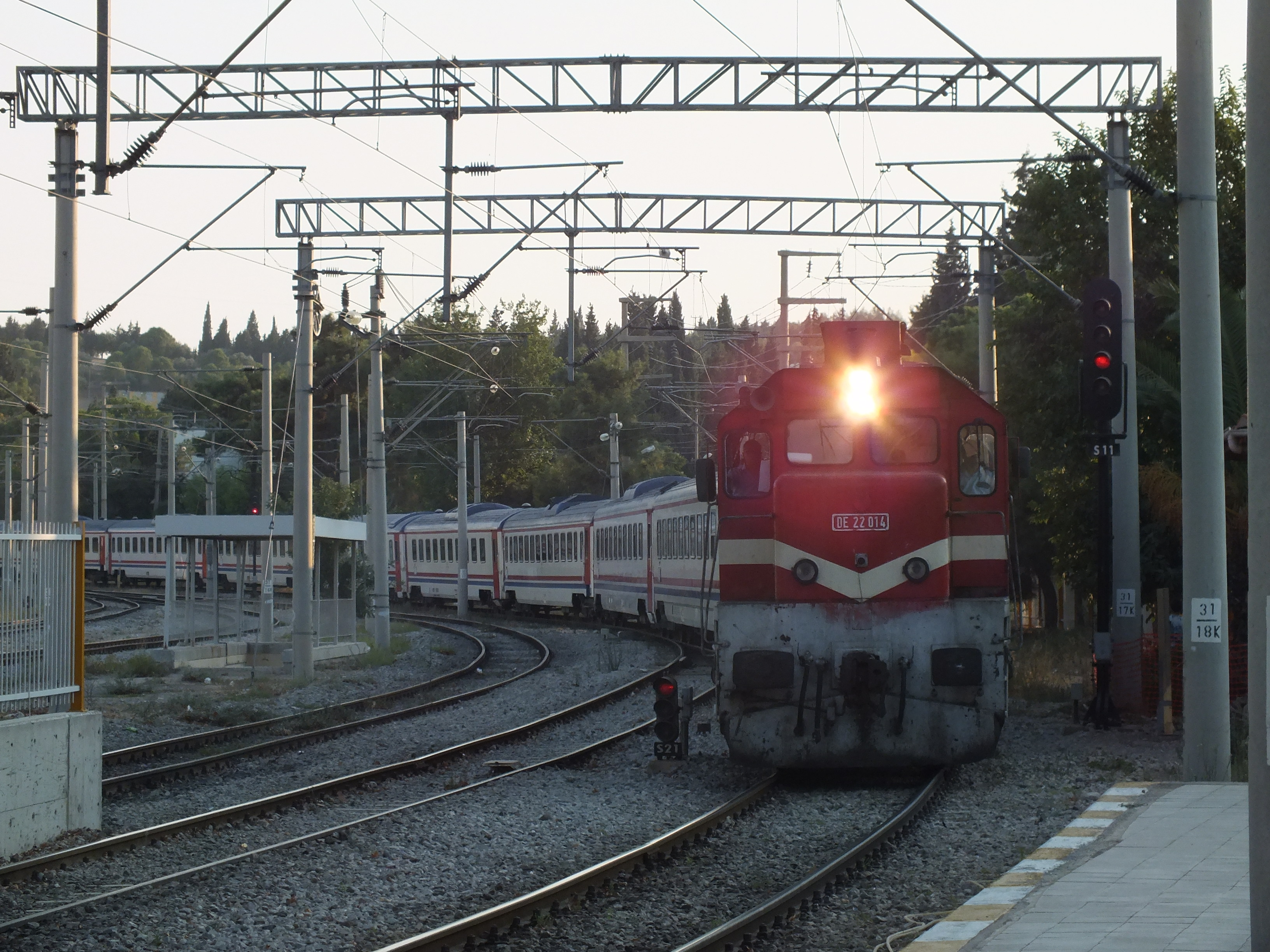
A DE22000 series locomotive pulls the Karesi Express into Menemen

Mainline service (Turkish: Anahat) is the railway's main service. In 2010 mainline services made up for 24% of the railway's passenger traffic. Mainline service includes 2 types of trains: Express and Blue Train.

Express service is between major cities and are fast, comfortable and equipped with modern air-conditioned TVS2000 railcars and only stop at important stations. Express trains have an average operating speed of 100 km/h (62 mph) to 120 km/h (75 mph). Express service has both day (e.g. İzmir-Bandırma) and overnight trains between major cities far apart (e.g. Ankara-Kars). These trains have coaches, a dining car and a sleeping car or a couchette car, or sometimes both.

The TVS2000 railcars used on mainline service are the most comfortable cars in TCDD's entire fleet. TVS2000 railcars may also be used on international services because international services are considered mainline services within Turkey.

==== International services ====
===== Former international services =====
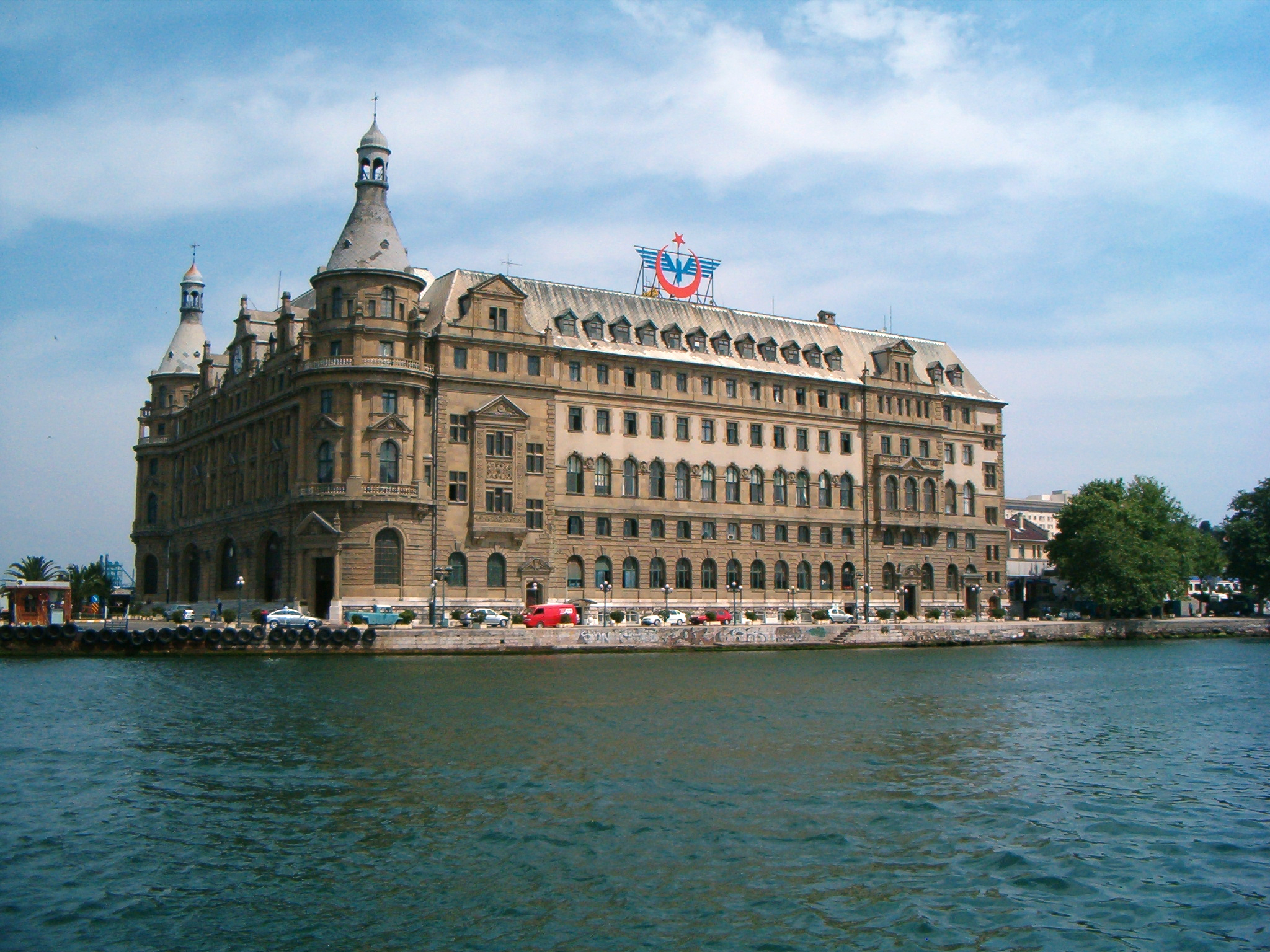
Haydarpaşa Terminal on the Asian side of Istanbul was opened in 1908 as the terminus of the Istanbul-Konya-Baghdad and Istanbul-Damascus-Medina lines.

The Haydarpaşa Terminal was the terminus for a weekly train, to Tehran in Iran, another train to Iran used to travel between Van, Turkey and Tebriz in Iran.

Additionally, trains from Iran to Syria (and vice versa) used to pass through Turkey.

- Trans-Asia Express, to Tehran, Iran via İzmit, Bilecik, Eskişehir, Ankara, Kayseri, Sivas, Elazığ, Tatvan (train-ferry), Van and Tabriz.
- Van-Tebriz Treni (Van – Tabriz train) Route: Van, Özalp, Kapıköy, Razi, border crossing to Iran, Salmas, Tabriz (and back.)
- Tehran – Damascus Train, route: Tehran, Tabriz, Razi, Kapıköy, border crossing to Turkey, Van, (train-ferry), Tatvan, Muş, Elazığ, Malatya, Fevzipaşa, Islahiye, Meydanekbez, Turkey – border crossing to Syria, (via Syrian Railways) – Meidan Ekbis, Aleppo, Damascus (and back.) This service was interrupted when the border between Syria and Turkey was closed due to the Syrian civil war.
- Taurus Express (Toros Ekspresi), route: Istanbul: Haydarpaşa Terminal, Eskişehir (Enveriye), Kütahya, Afyon, Konya, Adana, Fevzipaşa, Islahiye, Meydanekbez, border crossing to Syria (via Syrian Railways) – Aleppo, Damascus (and back.) (Note: Discontinued as of 2009)
- Gaziantep – Baghdad: This service was indefinitely suspended since 13 March 2003 with the invasion of Iraq and the ongoing insurgency. Route: Turkey: Gaziantep, Karkamış, Akçakale, Ceylanpınar, Şenyurt, Nusaybin, border crossing to Syria, Al Qamishli, (via Syrian Railways), border crossing to Iraq, El-Yaribieh, Rabia, Mosul, Baghdad. It was also running from Istanbul to Gaziantep as mainline until 2003. It is begun again on 16 August 2012 between Eskişehir-Adana but due to renovations, it's shortened to Konya-Adana route on 15 March 2013.
- Dostluk/Fillia Express (IC 90/91), to Thessaloniki, Greece via Uzunköprü, Pythion and Alexandroupolis.The line however was eventually terminated in February 2011.

==== Commuter services ====
As of 2011, the Turkish State Railways operated commuter rail in Istanbul and Ankara, with previous commuter service in İzmir from up to 2006, which is now operated by İZBAN. The railways use the E14000 and the E23000 EMUs on their commuter services. Previously, the newly retired E8000 EMUs and the E4000 electric locomotives were used as well. The first commuter rail service in Turkey was the Istanbul-Halkalı Line on the European side of Istanbul, operating from Sirkeci Terminal to Halkalı in 1955.

==== Rail freight transport ====
From 1980 onwards, rail freight tonne-kilometers transported by the TCDD rose slightly from ≈5000million tonne-km in 1980 to ≈7000million tonne-km in 1990 and to ≈9000million tonne-km in 2000. Approximately 50% of freight moved is minerals or ores, with construction materials increasing to ≈10% in 2000 from less than 5% in 1980, food/agricultural products, chemicals/petroleum, and metal sectors each account for between 5 and 10%. International freight accounted for approximately 5% of totals in 2000.

As of 2012, 25.7 million tons are transported by rail in Turkey. Two steel companies, Erdemir and Kardemir, top 2 customers of TCDD, had transported 4.5 million tons in 2012, mainly iron ore and coal. 2.1 million tons of rail freight belong to international traffic. Most of international traffic is between Turkey and Europe, done via Kapikule. Several container trains are running in this route as well as conventional wagons.

As of 2014, 26.6 million tons are transported on rail in Turkey. 7.1 million of it is done by private wagons. International transport went down to 1.7 million.

Containers are widely used both in international and domestic transportation. 7.6 million tons are carried in containers. TCDD supports transportation by containers. Thus, almost all of the private railway companies invested in container wagons, and carrying 20% of all rail freight by their own wagons.

TCDD has plans to strengthen freight traffic by adding 4000 km of conventional lines until 2023. That includes new international rail connections to Georgia, Iraq and Iran. TCDD is also constructing 18 logistic centers to enable transportation of more loads by rail.

TCDD is planning to increase its transit traffic (11000 to in 2011) by constructing "iron silk road" to connect Europe to Asia. Marmaray is the most important part of this project which was completed in 2015 and now in service. Another project is Kars–Tbilisi–Baku railway which is planned to be completed in 2016 and start functioning in 2017. Also, plans for another supplying project to Kars-Tbilisi-Baku railway, the Kars-Igdir-Nakhcivan high-speed railway has been completed. TCDD wants to have share from the freight traffic between Europe and China through this line.

==== Ports ====
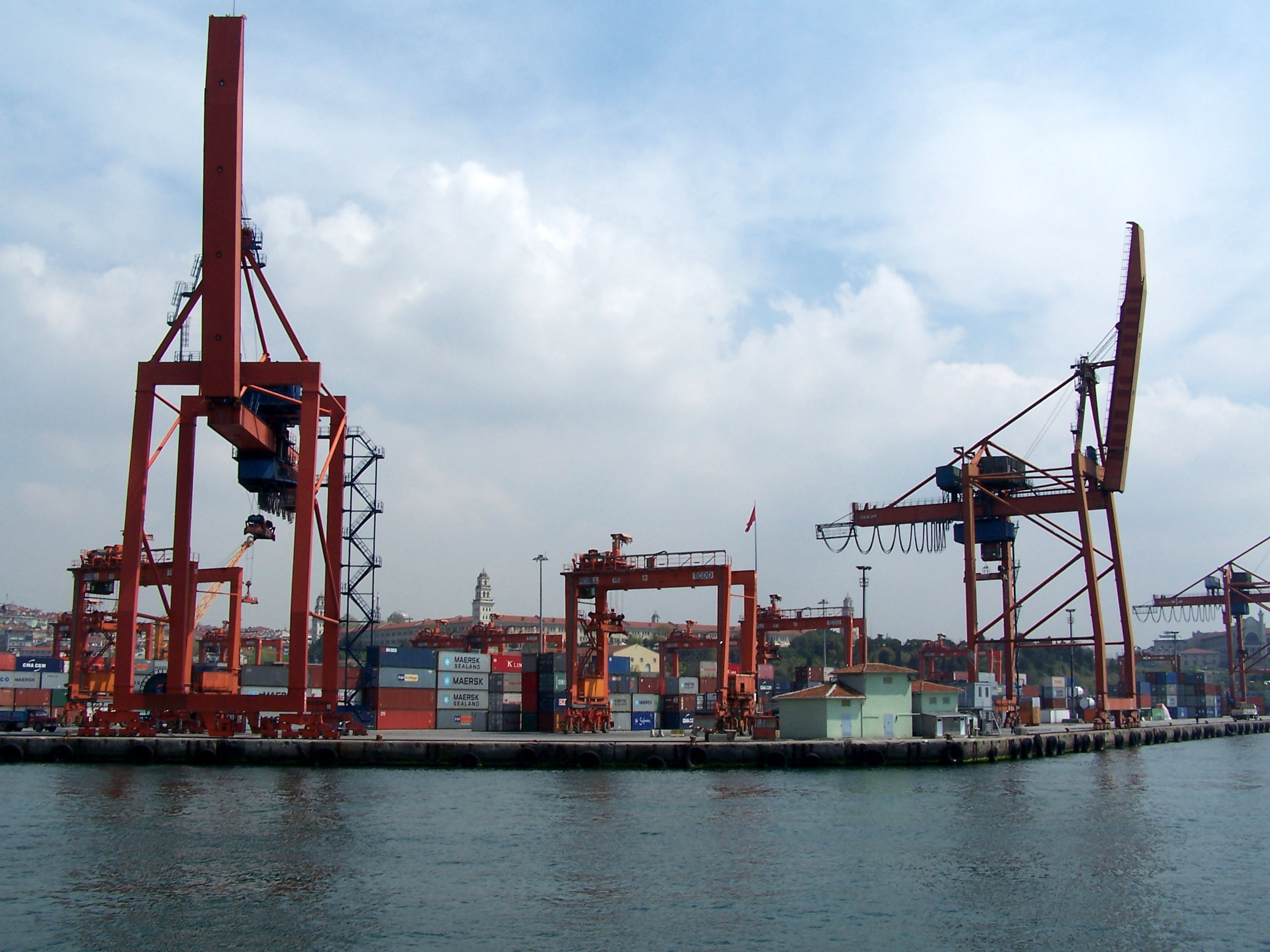
Port of Haydarpaşa

The State Railways own and operated seven ports throughout the country and has connections to two more ports. The ports TCDD owns are the Port of Haydarpaşa in Istanbul on the southern mouth of the Bosphorus, the Port of İzmir on the Aegean Sea, the Port of Mersin and the Port of İskenderun on the Mediterranean Sea, the Port of Bandırma on the Sea of Marmara, the Port of Derince on the Gulf of İzmit, and the Port of Samsun on the Black Sea. The railways have connections to the Port of Zonguldak, owned by Türkiye Taşkömürü Kurumu (Turkish Coal Company), the Port of Tekkeköy and the Port of Tekirdağ, owned by AKPORT AŞ. In 2004, the privatization of all ports except Haydarpaşa began.

By 2014 Mersin, Iskenderun, Bandirma, Samsun ports had been privatized. Tender for privatization of Derince Port has also completed and waiting for takeover.

The state railways are planning on building rail connections to the Port of Güllük (via Çine) and to the Port of Ereğli, which TCDD serviced until 2004.

The ports TCDD owns are the most important in Turkey. The country's five largest ports are owned by the state railways. The Port of Haydarpaşa will soon be decommissioned, when the Marmaray project is complete.

== Performance, market share, assets and financial results ==
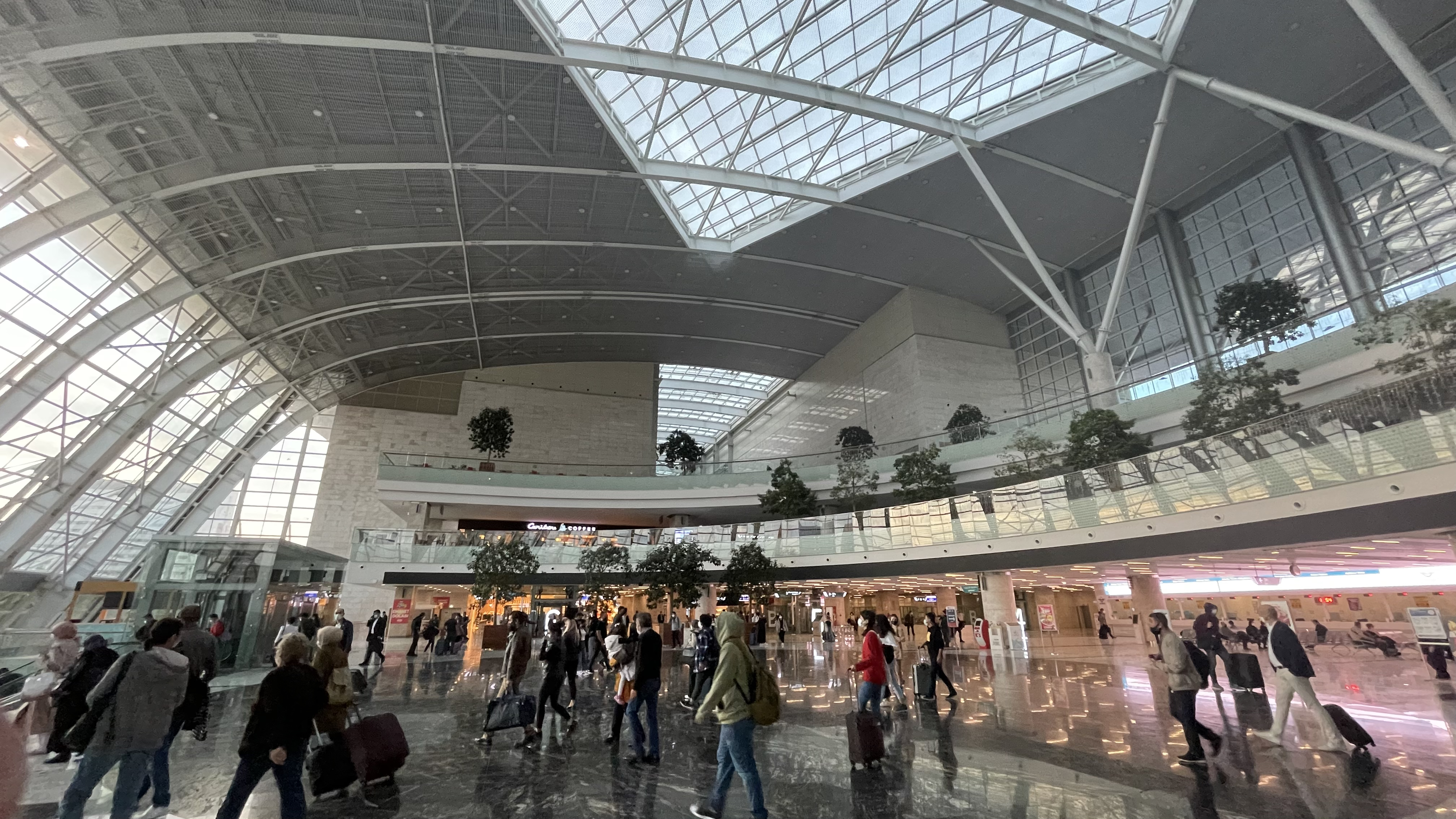
The ATG terminal in Ankara is a hub for the high-speed rail (YHT) services of the Turkish State Railways

Since 1950, the railway system's market share of freight transportation dropped from 70% to ≈55% (1960), ≈25% (1970), ≈10% (1980, 1990) and to less than 10% in 2000. A similar trend was observed in the percentage of passenger transport performed by rail – dropping from a share of greater than 40% in 1950 to ≈25% in 1960; less than 10% in 1970; ≈5% by 1980; and reaching an all-time low of 2% by 2000. This was partly due to major investment and expansion in the road network.

The TCDD receives subsidies from the government for socially necessary operations, but has registered increasing losses in all its areas of business except for port operations; which have high port tariffs (higher than 36%). By 2000, the cost to the Turkish government had exceeded $500 million per year in addition to a subsidy of over $100 million. In addition to the problems caused by the lack of investment from 1950 onwards, the TCDD organisation has been characterised as suffering from the common problems associated with state-owned enterprises; i.e. emphasis on production rather than customer needs; subject to government reliance and interference; and an inward-looking corporate culture.

As of 2008, the amount of freight transported was the highest ever (18.343 million tonne-kilometers); though actual growth was small over the previous 10 years, and passenger figures had risen slightly overall over the past decade.

As of 2008, the TCDD administers the Ankara Railway Factory, Sivas Concrete Sleeper factory, Afyon Concrete Sleeper factory, Behiçbey rail welding and track machinery repair factory and Çankırı Switch factory. Additionally, the state owned companies TÜLOMSAŞ, TÜDEMSAŞ and TÜVASAŞ are affiliates. The TCDD has a 50% share in the İzmir Banliyö Taşımacılığı Sistemi A.Ş. (İZBAN A.Ş.) which operates the metro in İzmir, and a 15% share in EUROTEM.

== Network ==
TCDD directly owns and operated 8,697 km (5,404 mi) of common carrier lines, of which 1,920 km (1,190 mi) are electrified, throughout 57 provinces. Along with this, the railways own and operated over 240 km (150 mi) of industrial lines and 206 km (128 mi) of high-speed lines, with 574 km (357 mi) of lines under construction. As of 2010, the railways consist of 763 tunnels, 25,441 bridges, 17 wyes and 7 loops. The railway's fleet consists of 467 main line Diesel locomotives, 67 Electric locomotives, 860 passenger coaches, 135 MUs, 33 High-speed rail sets and 15,384 freight cars.

=== Electrification ===
Electrified lines comprised less than half of the network in 2020, but the aim is for over three-quarters by 2023. Along with these several Turkish cities operate rapid transit and tram system electrified with either overhead wire or third rail.

By 2013, the electrified lines reached to 2416 km. There is also 888 km of electrified high speed train network, which makes 3304 km in total.

==== History ====
Turkish State Railways started an electrification plan in 1953. The plan was to first electrify important suburban lines in Istanbul and Ankara. The main reason for this was the many complaints of citizens living in the city about the pollution of the steam locomotives. The railways chose the standard 25 kV 50 Hz AC system to electrify with. The first line to be electrified was the Sirkeci-Halkalı line on the İstanbul commuter railway. Three electric locomotives were ordered from Alsthom and Jeumont from France as well as several sets of multiple units. Electrification was complete and electric train started to run on December 4, 1955. The electrification got many positive reactions. In 1969, TCDD electrified the Haydarpaşa–Gebze part of the commuter railway in İstanbul. Several more sets of E8000 emus were ordered as well as 15 E40000 electric locomotives to meet the demands of the railway. The Ankara Suburban Railway was electrified in 1972 and brand new E14000 multiple units were ordered.

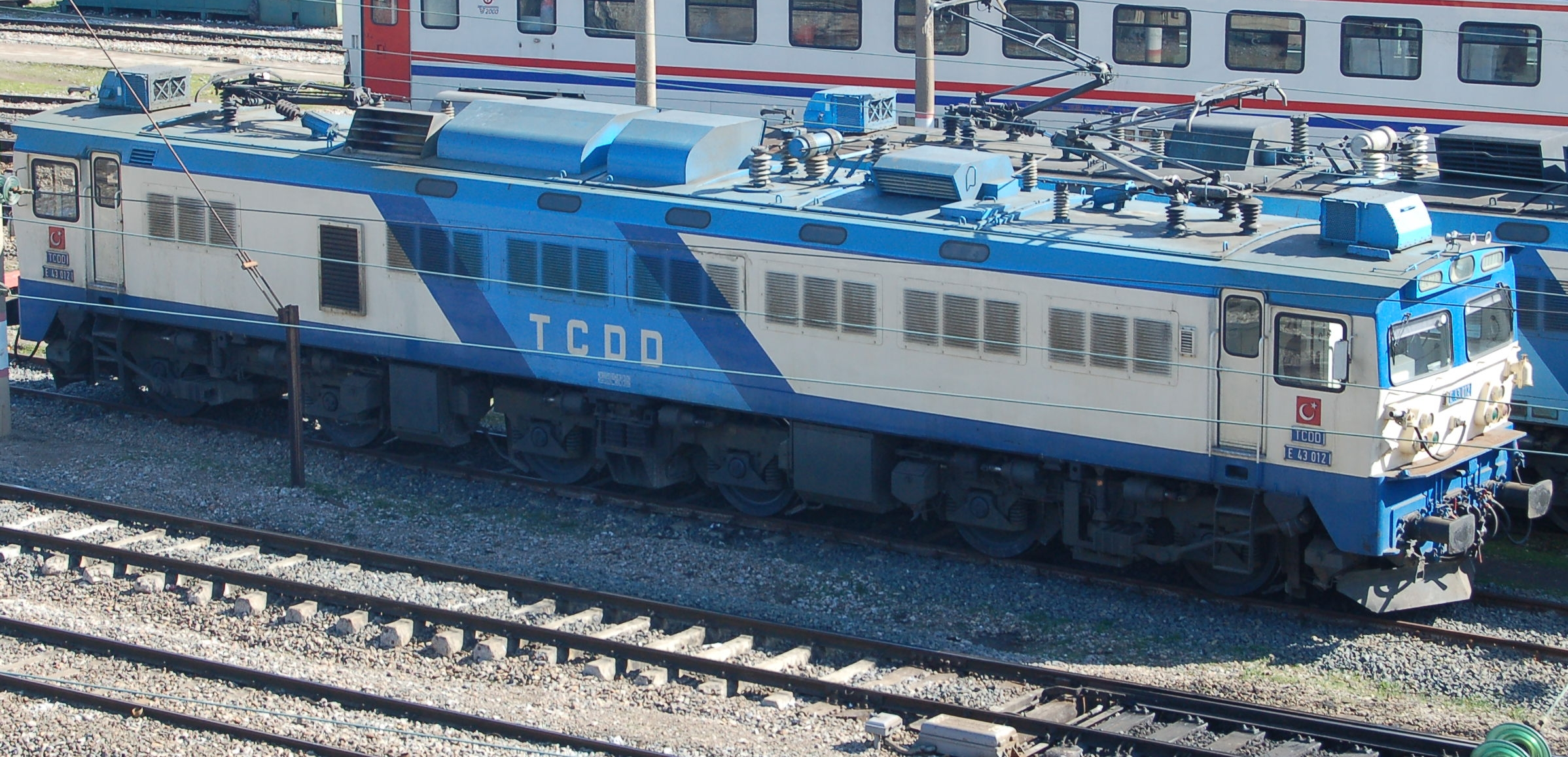
E43000 electric locomotive

With the success of electrifying suburban lines, the State Railways turned to electrify important main lines. The main reason for this is that tough gradients would be easier to climb with electric traction than steam or diesel traction. On February 6, 1977, TCDD finished the electrification as well as major earthworks of the Gebze-Adapazarı part of the İstanbul–Adapazarı main line. The State Railway then turned to electrify the entire İstanbul-Ankara main line, to try to save its diminishing reputation. Construction started in 1987. Forty-five E43000 electric locomotives were ordered from Toshiba and built in Eskişehir by Tülomsaş, to be used on the line. Electrification was completed between Arifye and Eskişehir and electric trains began to run in 1989. Electrification was connected to Ankara in 1993. The major ore route between Divriği and İskenderun was electrified in 1994 to make it easier for heavy trains to go up steep gradients. İstanbul to Edirne and Kapıkule was electrified in 1997 and 15 new E52500 electric locomotives were delivered from ASEA in 1998. In an attempt to revive İzmir's suburban network, Alsancak-Cumaovası and Basmane-Aliağa lines were electrified in 2001 and 2002 respectively. However these were not used at all. In 2006 the wires were taken down and the line was re-electrified completely between 2006 and 2010. This line opened on August 30, 2010, between Alsancak-Cumaovası and October 29, 2010, between Alsancak and Aliağa.

==== High speed rail ====
The United Kingdom through Export Finance, a credit agency gave a Turkish multinational a €781m loan to finish the High speed rail. The railway is between Gaziantep and Mersin through Adana and Osmaniye. Rönesans Holding, the Dutch Turkish company in charge of the project is required by the UK to be supplied by British suppliers. Mehmet Şimşek, Turkish finance minister said the project is meant to improve the connectivity of Turkey and upgrades Turkey's historic south trade route. The high speed rail is supposed to reach 225 km/h, to reach this Railway Supply said Turkey will have to indtroduce modern modifications of its transport system and update train engines. The Turkish transportation ministry said eight carriages are supposed to commence passenger transportation in 2025.

==== Future plans ====
Almost 1500 km of track was planned to be completely electrified in 2020.

==== Sources ====
- Difiglio, Prof. Carmine; Güray, Bora Şekip; Merdan, Ersin (November 2020). Turkey Energy Outlook. iicec.sabanciuniv.edu (Report). Sabanci University Istanbul International Center for Energy and Climate (IICEC). ISBN 978-605-70031-9-5.

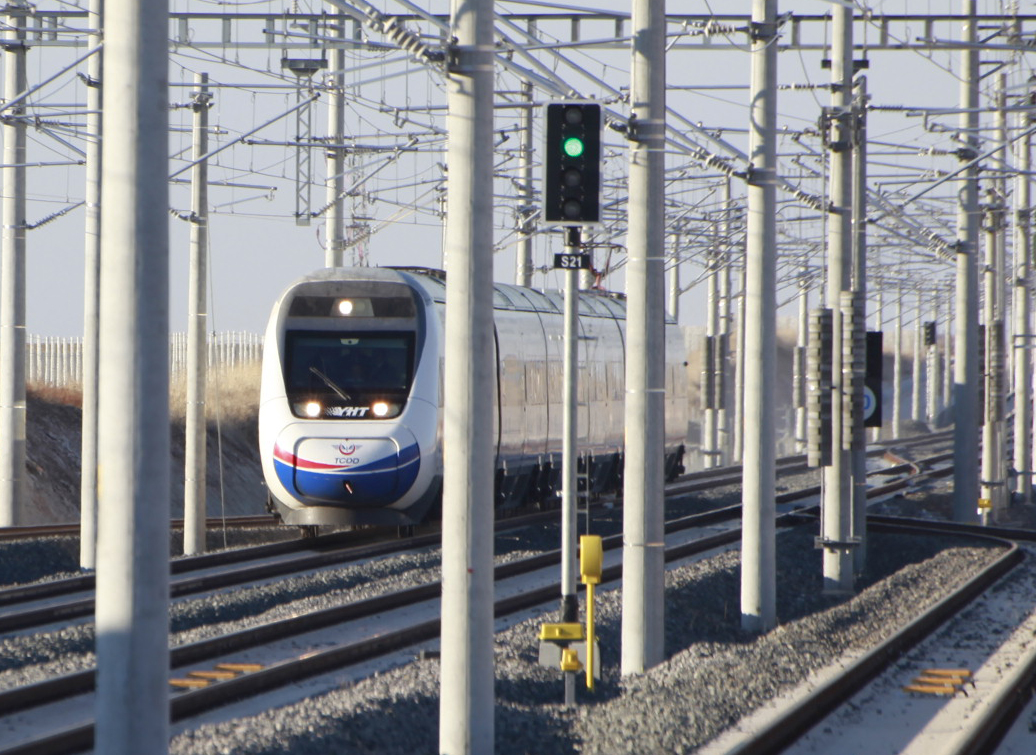
A TCDD HT65000 high-speed train on the Ankara–Konya YHT line

Turkey has chosen to electrify at the conventional 25 kV 50 Hz AC. The first electrified lines were the Istanbul suburban lines on the European side, from Sirkeci to Soğuksu, on 4 December 1955, and in the same period the E8000 electrical multiple units were taken into use. The suburban lines on the Asian side of Istanbul, from Haydarpaşa to Gebze, were electrified in 1969; while the Ankara suburban trains were electrified in 1972, on the line from Sincan to Kayaş.

On 6 February 1977 the tracks from Gebze to Adapazarı were made double track and electrified, allowing the first main line operation of electric trains in Turkey. The line from Arifiye outside Adapazarı to Eskişehir were further electrified in 1989 and in 1993 to Sincan, allowing electric train passages from Istanbul to Ankara. In 1994 the European lines from Istanbul to Edirne, Kapıkule and the Bulgarian border were also electrified. The same year the line from Divriği to İskenderun in eastern Turkey was also electrified, though this line is not connected to the rest of the electrified network. In 2006 the İzmir suburban system was also electrified.

=== Railway links with adjacent countries ===
The following is a list of railway border crossings of Turkey.

#	Name	In province	Open/closed since	To country	Counterpart	Status	Break-of-gauge
1	Uzunköprü	Edirne	4 September 1953	Greece	Pythion	Closed (no train runs since February 2011 due to the economic crisis in Greece)	No
2	Kapıkule	Edirne	1 April 1988	Bulgaria	Svilengrad	Open	No
3	İslahiye	Gaziantep	4 September 1953	Syria	Ekbez	Closed	No
4	Al-Rai	Kilis	4 September 1953	Syria	Akhtarin	Closed	No
5	Akyaka	Kars	4 September 1953 – 11 July 1993	Armenia	-	Closed	Yes
6	Nusaybin	Mardin	4 September 1953	Syria	Qamishli	Closed	No
7	Kapıköy	Van	7 October 1971	Iran	Razi	Open	No
8	Çıldır	Ardahan	30 October 2017	Georgia	Kartsakhi	Open for freight only	Yes

==== See also ====
- Land border crossings of Turkey
- Kars–Gyumri–Tbilisi railway (Kars–Gymri section closed since 1993)
- Baku–Tbilisi–Kars railway

==== West neighboring countries ====
- Bulgaria – open – 1,435 mm (4 ft 8 1/2 in) – 25 kV, 50 Hz AC
- Greece – closed – 1,435 mm (4 ft 8 1/2 in) – 25 kV, 50 Hz AC (no train runs since February 2011)

==== East neighboring countries ====
- (Georgia (country)) Georgia – freight only – break-of-gauge 1,435 mm (4 ft 8 1/2 in)/1,520 mm (4 ft 11 27/32 in) at Akhalkalaki (Georgia; see the Baku–Tbilisi–Kars railway)
- Armenia – closed since 1993 – break-of-gauge 1,435 mm (4 ft 8 1/2 in)/1,520 mm (4 ft 11 27/32 in) (see the Kars-Gyumri-Tbilisi railway line)
- Azerbaijan – no direct link – break-of-gauge 1,435 mm (4 ft 8 1/2 in)/1,520 mm (4 ft 11 27/32 in) via Georgia open since 2017 (Kars -Iğdır - Nakhchivan railway construction work officially commenced in April 2025.)
- Iran – open , via Lake Van train ferry – 1,435 mm (4 ft 8 1/2 in)
- Iraq – no direct link, traffic routed via Syria – 1,435 mm (4 ft 8 1/2 in)
- Syria – closed because of the Syrian civil war – 1,435 mm (4 ft 8 1/2 in)

=== Logistic centers and yards ===
TCDD is constructing 18 logistic centers to be completed till 2023 to increase the portion of railway in freight transportation. These centers (also called as freight villages) will have railway connected container yards, cranes, warehouses, customs service and other facilities. These 18 logistic centers are: Halkali, Samsun-Gelemen, Usak (completed) Kosekoy-Izmit, Hasanbey-Eskisehir, Kaklik-Denizli, Bogazkopru-Kayseri (partially completed) Yesilbayır-Istanbul, Gökköy-Balikesir, Bozüyük-Bilecik, Kayacık-Konya, Yenice-Mersin, Sivas, Türkoğlu-Kahramanmaraş, Kars, Palandöken-Erzurum, Mardin (under construction)

Marşandiz Yard is in Ankara.

=== Ferries ===
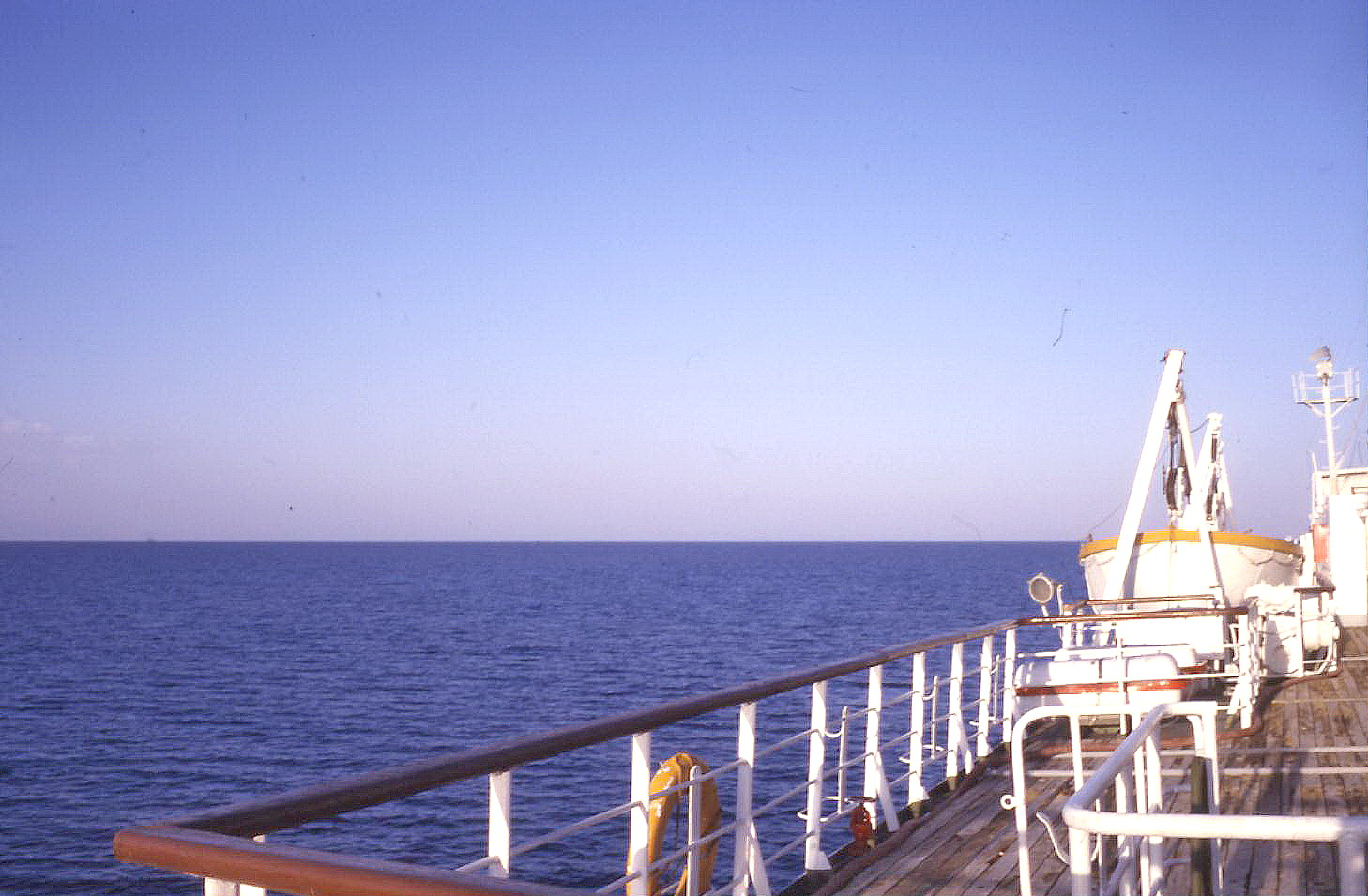
Van Lake Train Ferry and Van terminal

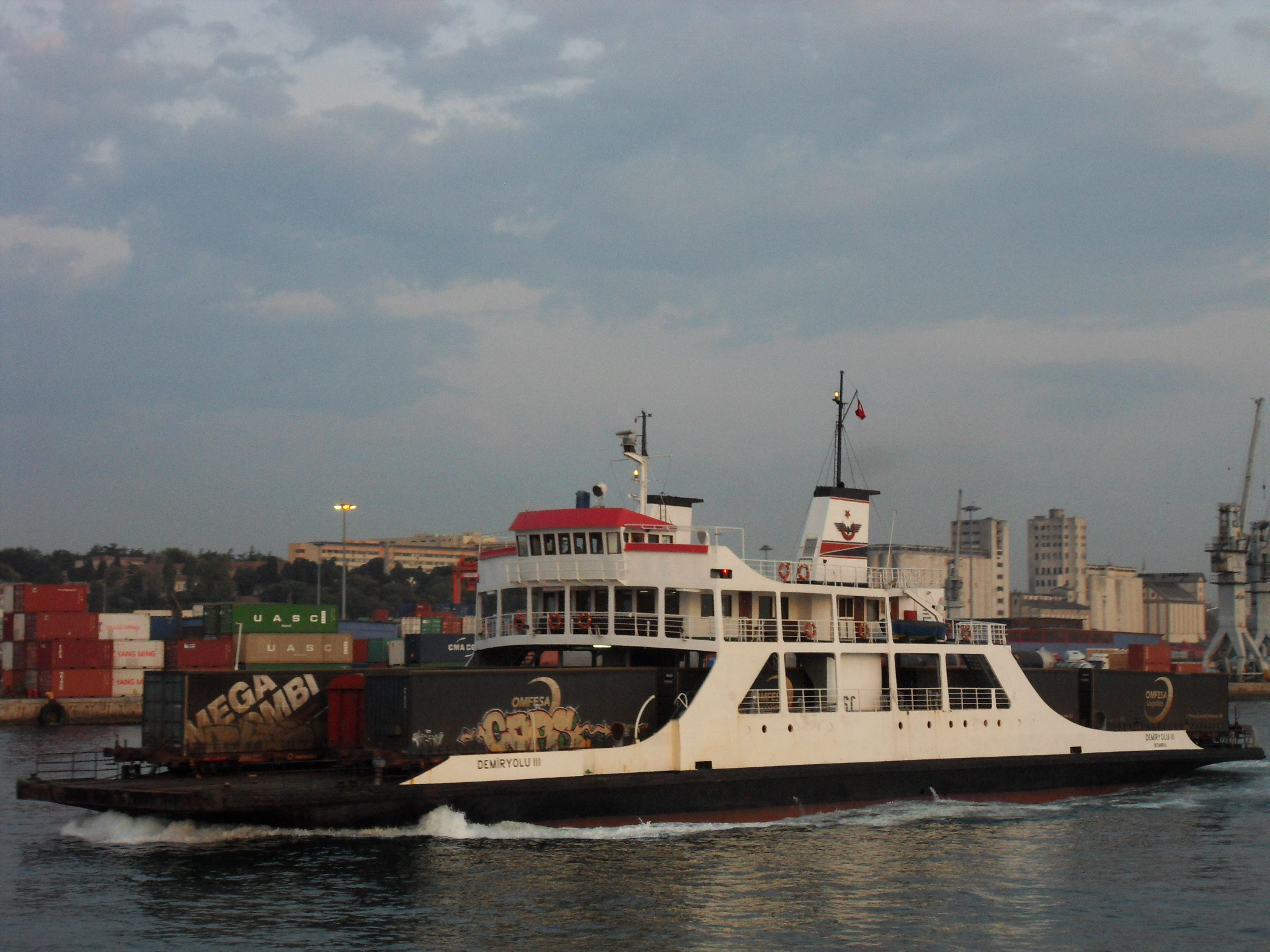
A TCDD Train Ferry in Istanbul.

The Turkish State Railways own and operate two rail train ferries and connects to three others.

The most famous of these would be the Bosphorus train ferry in Istanbul. This ferry connects Haydarpaşa, on the Asian side, with Sirkeci, on the European side. Demiryolu and Demiryolu II are the two ferries that operate on the route and are owned by TCDD.

By starting the project of Marmaray, TCDD ended the Bosphorus train ferry and announced an alternative ferry for the freight trains passing from Europe to Asia or vice versa: Tekirdağ-Derince Ferry. It's a private ferry named Erdemir working as a subcontractor of TCDD. Ferry did trials in 2012, and had started regular transportation at the end of 2013. Ferry has 5 lines with 800-meter total length.

The other train ferry owned by TCDD would be the Lake Van ferry, connecting Tatvan and Van via Lake Van, Turkey's largest lake. This ferry is a part of the only railway connection between Turkey and Iran, and thereby between Europe and India. Sultan Alparslan and Idris-i Bitlisi are the names of the ferries that operate on the route and are also fully owned by TCDD.

Other train ferries:

- Derince, Turkey to Chornomorsk, Ukraine – TCDD owns and operates the Port of Derince.
- Zonguldak to Ereğli – Operated by Alyans Tempo Group.

=== Network extensions and modernizations ===
The Turkish State Railways currently has many network extension and modernization projects planned. TCDD is seeing the largest investment since the 1930s and with these investments is constructing new lines, primarily high-speed lines.

In addition to 5000 km high-speed line, Turkish Ministry of Transportation announced the construction of 4000 km new conventional rail lines as a part of 2023 strategy.

TCDD has also been renewing the existing lines, some to be electrified, signalized and/or made double tracked. The budget for renewals and infrastructure of existing lines is more than 1 billion TL in 2014.

There are also commuter rail projects (renewal or new lines) like Marmaray, İzban, Başkentray or Gaziray that are completed.
