= TCDD E8000 =

Turkish State Railways electric train stock

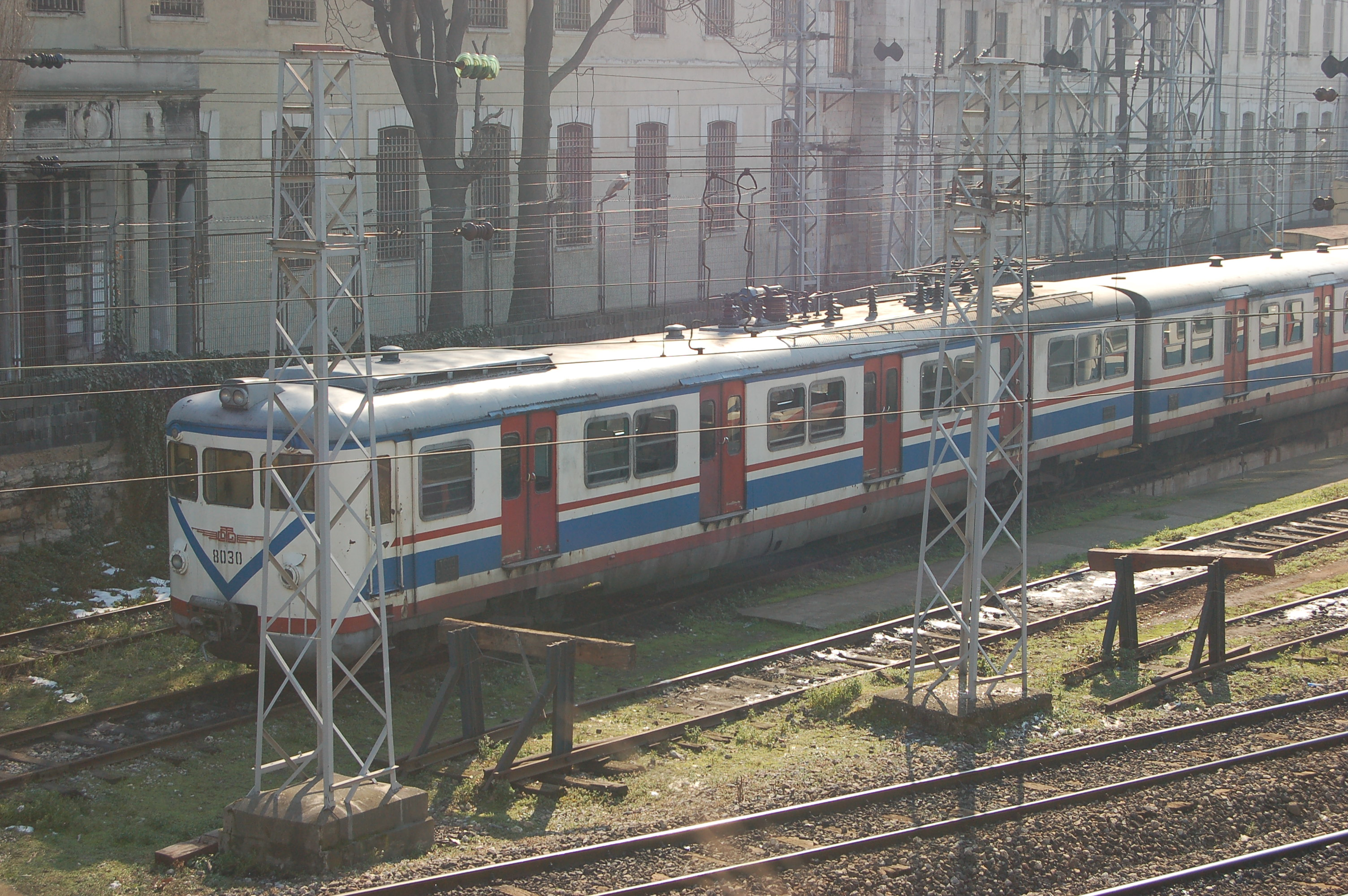
- TCDD E8000 unit E8030 at Istanbul Sirkeci station in February 2008
- In service: 1955–2011
- Manufacturers: Alstom; Jeumont; De Dietrich Ferroviaire
- Number built: 28 units
- Successor: TCDD E32000
- Formation: 3 cars
- Operator: Turkish State Railways
- Line served: Istanbul suburban

Specifications
- Train length: 68,000 mm (223 ft 1 in)
- Maximum speed: 90 km/h (56 mph)
- Weight: 120 t (120 long tons; 130 short tons)
- Axle load: 17.5 t (17.2 long tons; 19.3 short tons)
- Power output: 1,100 kW (1,475 hp)
- Electric system: 25 kV 50 Hz AC
- Track gauge: 1,435 mm (4 ft 8 1/2 in)

The TCDD E8000 is a three-car electric multiple unit operated by the Turkish State Railways (TCDD) on the Istanbul suburban service. They were some of the first electric trains using the newly developed 25 kV 50 Hz AC power system.

== Technical specifications ==
The trains are equipped with conventional transformers and camshaft-controlled step switches, with a power output of 1,100 kW (1,475 hp) and a maximum speed of 90 km/h (56 mph).

== History ==
A total of 28 TCDD E8000s were built by French manufacturers Alstom, Jeumont and De Dietrich Ferroviaire, with deliveries beginning in 1955. They were used on the newly electrified European commuter train service in Istanbul. After the Asian side electrification, the trains also served there. They were lengthened to four cars with locally manufactured intermediate cars, which were later withdrawn.

The original livery was dark-red and white. On 1 September 2010 the arrival of new trains was cut in 2011 after waiting for 6 months.
