= Bostancı Ferry Terminal =

Bostancı Terminal

General information
- Location: Çetin Emeç Blv., Bostancı Mah., 34744; Kadıköy, Istanbul; Turkey
- Coordinates: 40.9524°N 29.0922°E
- Operator: İDO
- Lines: Bostancı-Avşa; Bostancı-Esenköy; Bostancı-Bakırköy; Bostancı-Beşiktaş
- Connections: TCDD Taşımacılık at Bostancı; Şehir Hatları at Bostancı Pier; IETT Bus: 2, 4, 10B, 16, 16D, 17, 17L, 17S, 19SB, 202, 222; Istanbul Minibus: Bostancı-S.Çeşme Metrobüs, Kadıköy-Bostancı, Bostancı-Kartal, Bostancı-Pendik

Construction
- Accessible: Yes

History
- Opened: 1987

Services
Preceding station	İDO	Following station
Yenikapı towards Avşa	Bostancı-Avşa	Terminus
Yenikapı towards Esenköy	Bostancı-Esenköy	Terminus
Kadıköy towards Bakırköy	Bostancı-Bakırköy	Terminus
Beşiktaş Terminus	Bostancı-Beşiktaş	Terminus
Location
- Location within Istanbul

The Bostancı Ferry Terminal (Turkish: Bostancı Feribot Terminali), also known as the Bostancı İDO Terminal (Turkish: Bostancı İDO Terminali), is a ferry terminal in Bostancı, Kadıköy located on Çetin Emeç Boulevard on the Marmara Sea in Istanbul. İDO operates seabus ferry service from Bostancı to other piers in Istanbul as well as destinations across the Marmara Sea. It is located adjacent to the historic Bostancı Pier, built in 1913.

Connection to IETT city bus service as well as train service from the nearby Bostancı station is available.

Bostancı Terminal opened in 1987 and was one of İDO's first three ferry terminals along with Kabataş and Bakırköy. In the 1990s, İDO expanded their ferry service greatly and ferries operated out of Bostancı to Kartal, Pendik, Yenikapı as well as Marmara and Avşa Island. The terminal itself consists of a terminal building, with six ferry slips and slips for layovers. Inside the terminal building are ticket offices, waiting areas and cafes.
