= Bandırma Ferry Terminal =

Bandırma Terminal Bandırma Ferribot Terminali
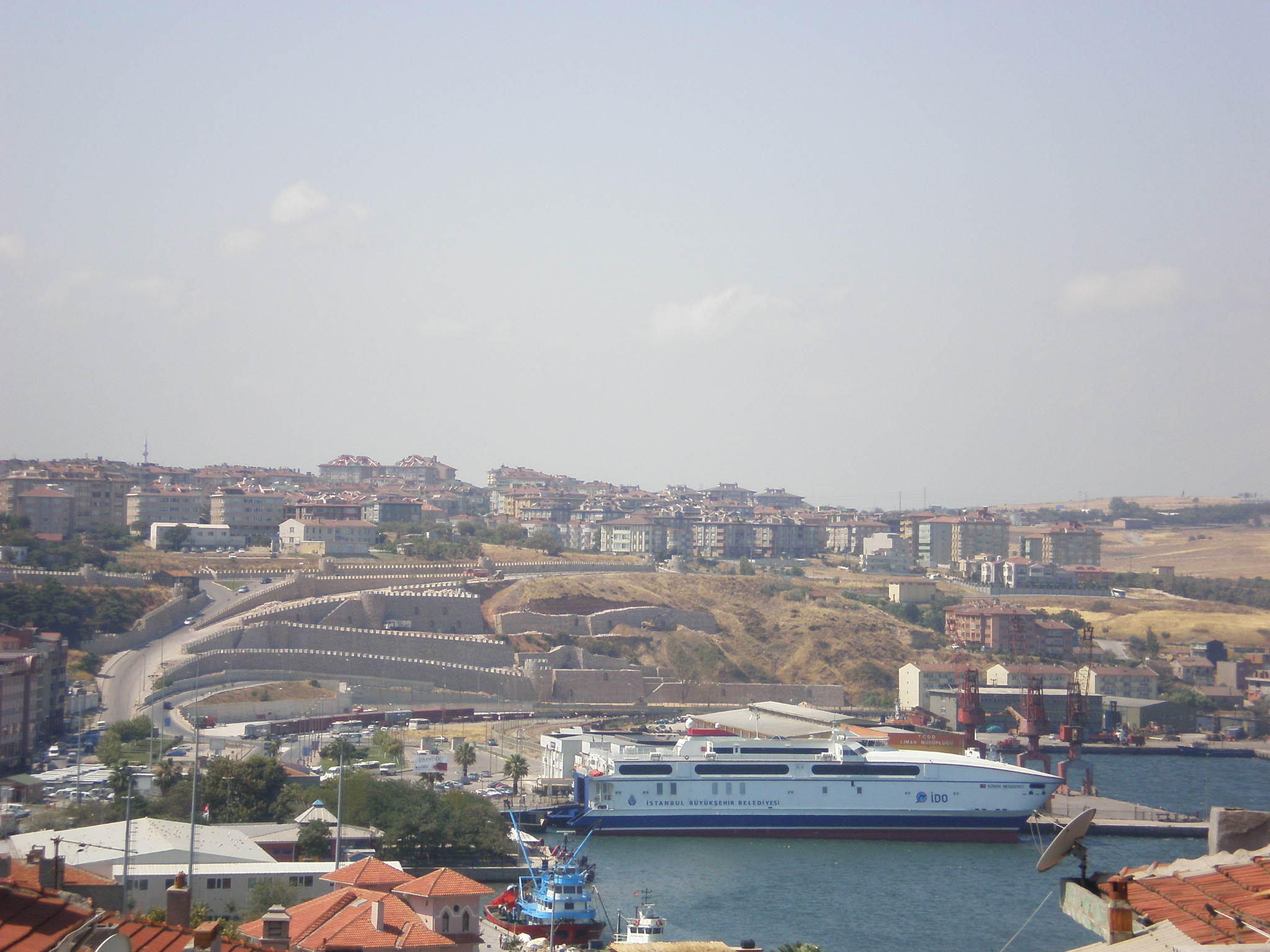
- A ferry docked at the Terminal with the Port of Bandırma viable to the right.

General information
- Location: Cumhuriyet Cad., Ayyıldız Mah., 10200; Bandırma, Balıkesir; Turkey
- Coordinates: 40.3528°N 27.9675°E
- Operator: İDO
- Line: Yenikapı-Bandırma
- Connections: TCDD Taşımacılık at Bandırma

Construction
- Accessible: Yes

History
- Opened: 1998

Services
Preceding station	İDO	Following station
Terminus	Yenikapı-Bandırma (Fast Ferry)	Yenikapı Terminus
Location

The Bandırma Ferry Terminal Turkish: Bandırma Ferribot Terminali) or Bandırma Pier (Turkish: Bandırma İskelesi) is a ferry terminal in Bandırma, Turkey, located within the Port of Bandırma on the Marmara Sea. It is used by İDO, which operates ferry service from Bandırma to Yenikapı in Istanbul.

The terminal opened in 1998, when İDO began operating ferry service to Bandırma. Connections to intercity train service to İzmir are available via Bandırma station, located adjacent to the terminal.

The terminal is located in the Ayyıldız neighborhood, just southeast of the city center, on the east side of the Port of Bandırma.
