= Kadıköy Ferry Terminal =

Ferry terminal in Kadıköy, Istanbul, Turkey

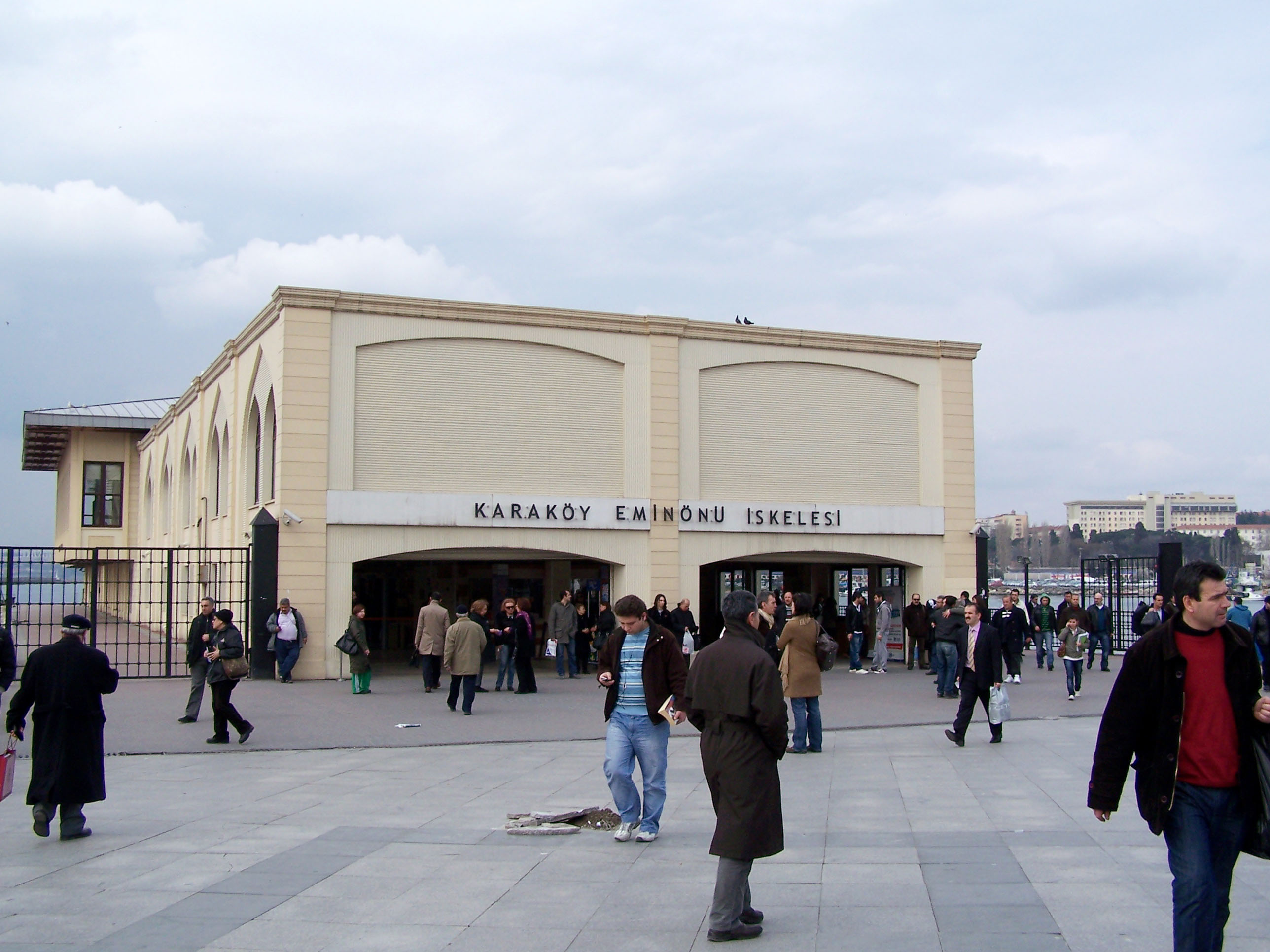
- Kadıköy Ferry Terminal of the Karaköy-Eminönü Line

General information
- Location: Damga Sk., Caferağa Mah., 34710; Kadıköy, Istanbul; Turkey
- Coordinates: 40.9909°N 29.0187°E
- Operator: İDO
- Lines: Kadıköy-Armutlu-Bursa; Kadıköy-Bursa; Bostancı-Bakırköy
- Connections: Istanbul Metro at Kadıköy; Moda Heritage tram Şehir Hatları at Kadıköy Pier; Turyol at Çayırbaşı Pier and Kadıköy Pier; İETT Bus: 4, 10B, 13Y, 14A, 14AK, 14DK, 14M, 15BK, 15F, 16, 16D, 17, 17L, 19E, 19ES, 19F, 19M, 19S, 19T, 20E, 222; Istanbul Minibus; Havabüs

Construction
- Accessible: Yes

History
- Opened: 1992

Services
Preceding station	İDO	Following station
Yenikapı towards Bursa	Kadıköy-Armutlu-Bursa	Terminus
Yenikapı towards Bursa	Kadıköy-Bursa	Terminus
Yenikapı towards Bakırköy	Bostancı-Bakırköy	Bostancı Terminus
Location
- Location within Istanbul

The Kadıköy Ferry Terminal (Turkish: Kadıköy Feribot Terminali), also known as the Kadıköy İDO Terminal (Turkish: Kadıköy İDO Terminali), is a ferry terminal in Kadıköy, Istanbul, located near Damga Street on the Bosporus strait. It is one of four ferry landings within Kadıköy Harbor. İDO operates seabus ferries to Yenikapı, Bakırköy and Bostancı in Istanbul, as well as to destinations across the Marmara Sea.

Kadıköy Terminal was opened in 1992, as part of the Metropolitan Municipality's expansion of the İDO system.

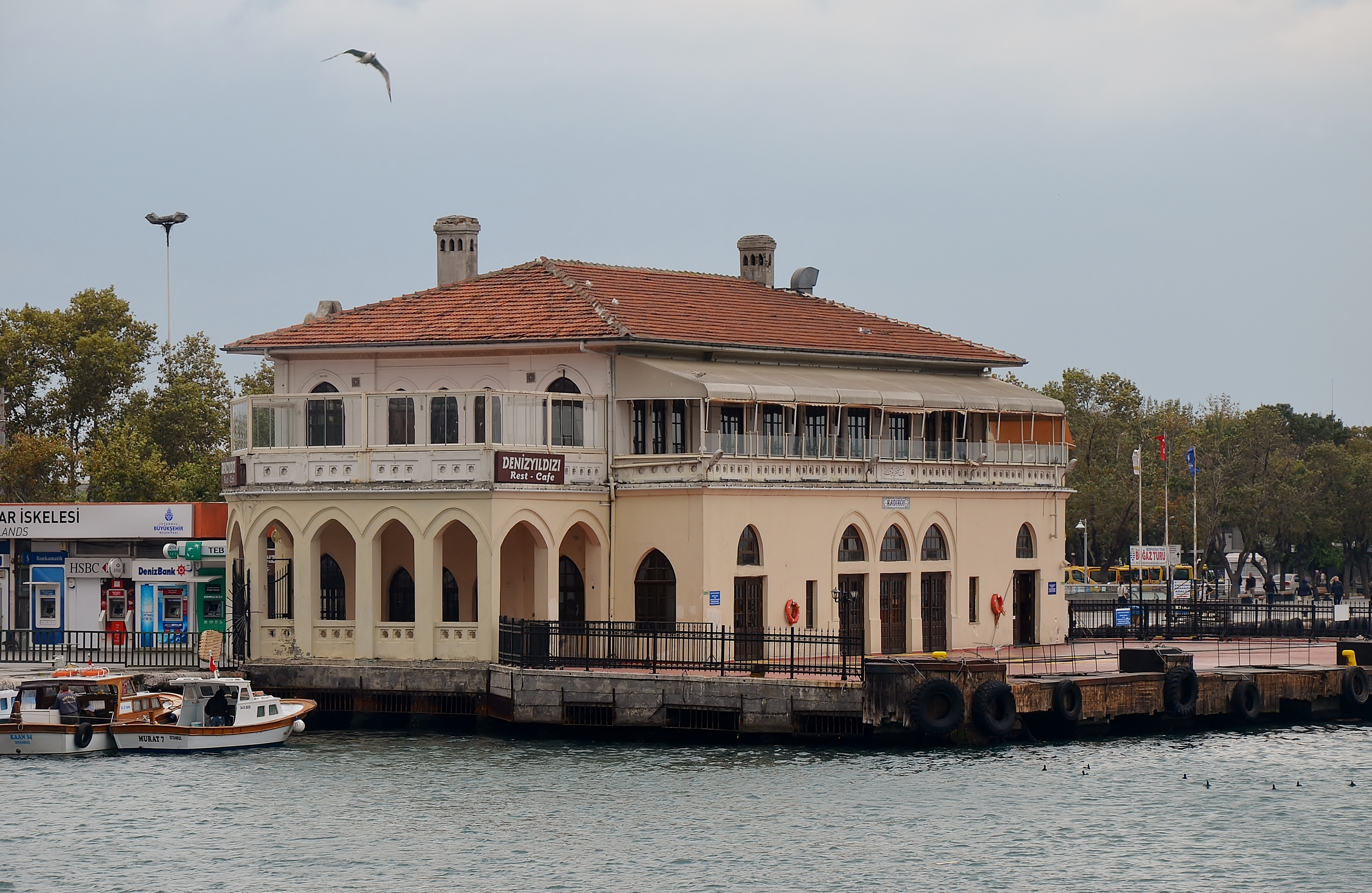
Old ferry pier
