= Yenikapı Transfer Center =

Station of the Istanbul Metro

Yenikapı Aktarma Merkezi
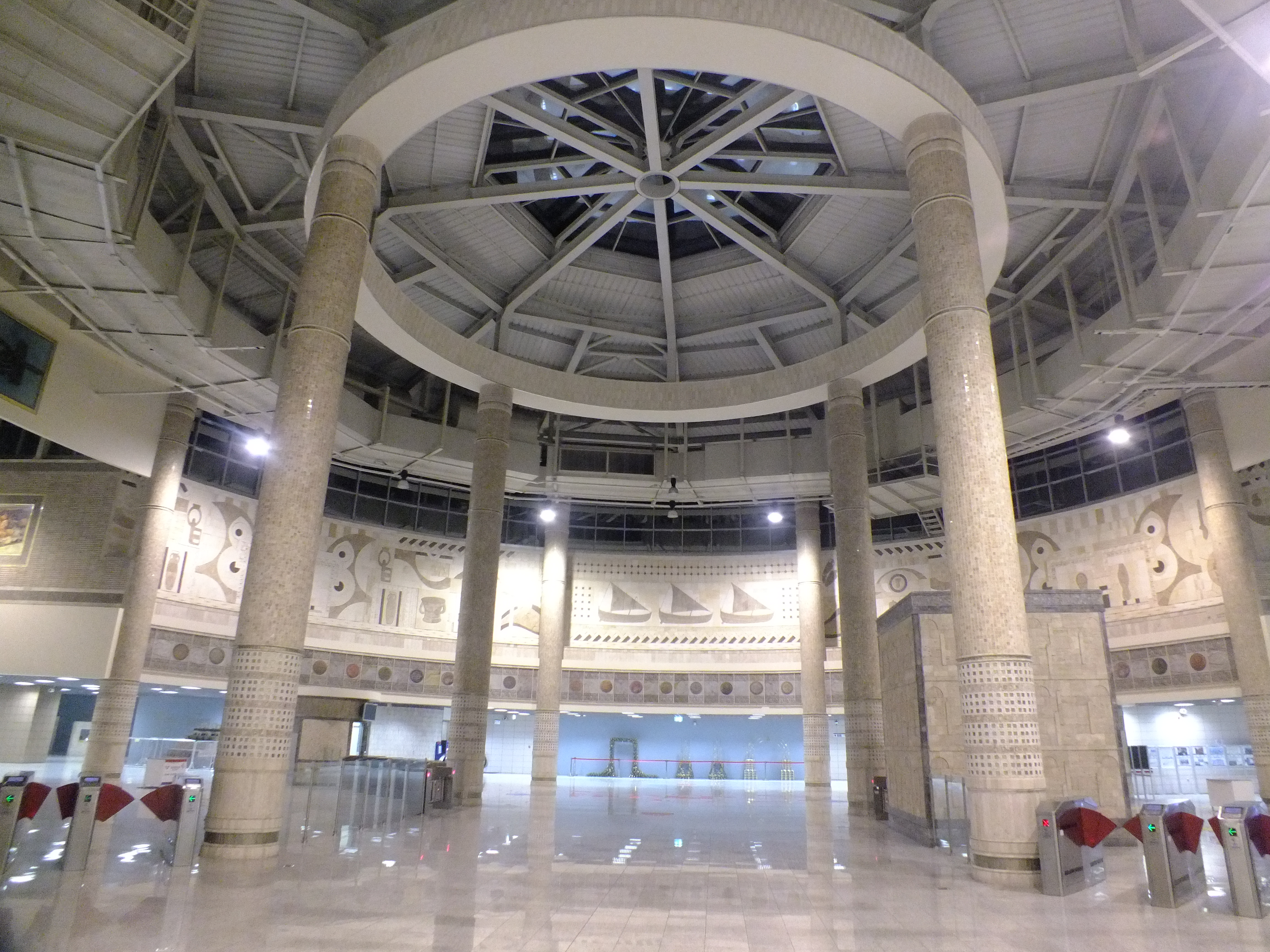
- The central hall of the Yenikapı complex with the turnstiles to the Marmaray platform visible.

General information
- Location: Gazi Mustafa Kemal Paşa Cd. & Namık Kemal Cd., Aksaray Mah., 34096; Fatih, Istanbul, Istanbul; Turkey
- Coordinates: 41.0053°N 28.9516°E
- System: TCDD Taşımacılık railway and Istanbul Metro rapid transit complex
- Owner: Istanbul Metropolitan Municipality
- Lines: TCDD Taşımacılık; Marmaray; Istanbul Metro; M1ᴀ; M1ʙ; M2
- Platforms: 5 (2 side platforms, 3 island platforms
- Tracks: 7
- Connections: İDO at Yenikapı Terminal; İETT Bus: 30D, 31, 31Y, 50Y, 70FY, 70KY, 72YT, 76A, 77, 88A, 146T, 336Y, BN1; Istanbul Dolmus: Taksim-Bakırköy, Taksim-Florya, Taksim-Yenibosna, Taksim-Yeşilköy

Construction
- Structure type: Underground
- Parking: 400 spaces
- Accessible: Yes

History
- Opened: 29 October 2013; 12 years ago (Marmaray); 15 February 2014; 12 years ago (M2); 9 November 2014; 11 years ago (M1A, M1B)
Location
- Location within Istanbul

Yenikapı Transfer Center (Turkish: Yenikapı Aktarma Merkezi), referred to as Yenikapı, is an underground transportation complex in Istanbul. It is located in south-central Fatih in the neighborhood of Yenikapı, hence the name of the hub. The complex is right next to the Yenikapı railway station serving the T6 light rail line and a short walk away from the Yenikapı Ferry Terminal and İDO ferry service. Yenikapı complex links two stations of Istanbul Metro to a railway station of the Turkish State Railways on the trans-Bosphorus Marmaray tunnel. Yenikapı is the largest rapid transit station in Turkey.

== History ==
Construction of the Marmaray project started at Yenikapı in May 2004. The new Yenikapı station site was chosen to be just north of the existing railway station and would be built underground as part of the trans-Bosphorus tunnel. Yenikapı was expected to be completed in December 2009 but due to archaeological findings at the construction site delayed the project by four years. In 2008 plans to extend the M2 and the M1 lines south were finalized and Yenikapı was chosen as the southern terminus. Construction of the M2's southern extension started in January 2009 with the Golden Horn Metro Bridge across the Golden Horn. The project was expected to open in August 2010, but due to delays it wasn't opened until 2014. The Marmaray section was the first part of the complex to open, entering service on 29 October 2013. The M2 section opened on 15 February 2014, followed by the M1 section on 9 November 2014.

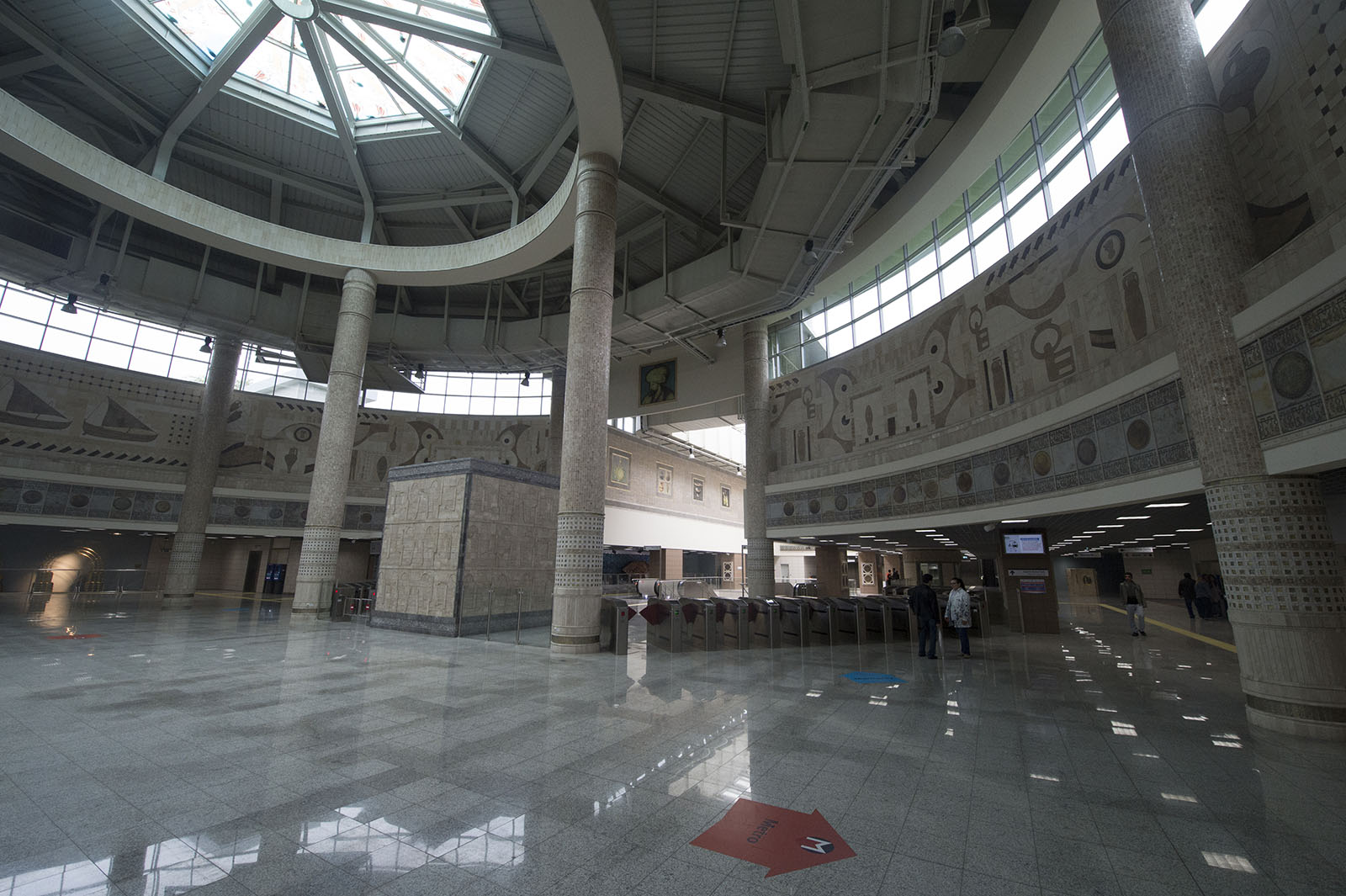
Yenikapı metro station Central hall

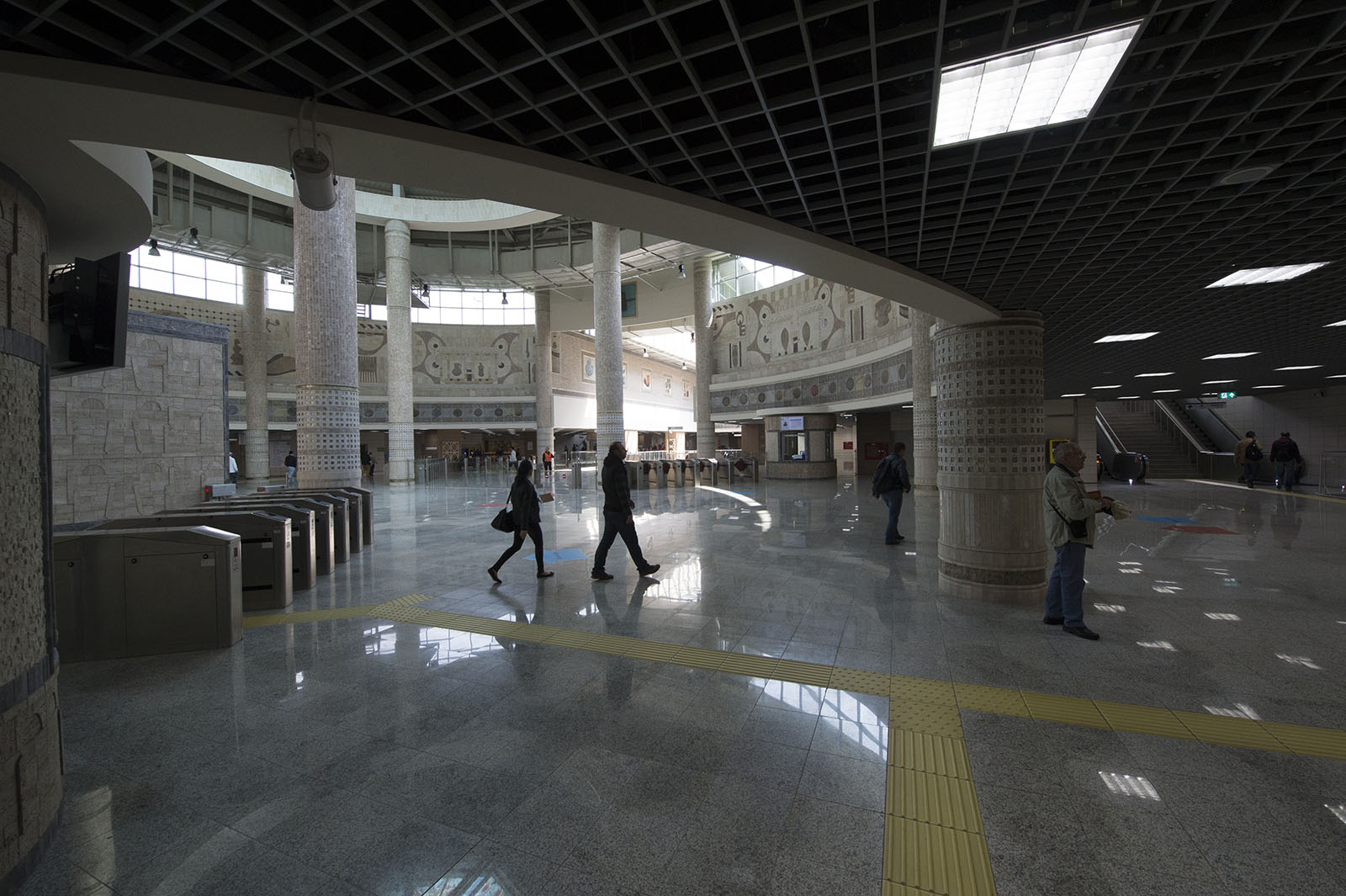
Yenikapı metro station Central hall from side

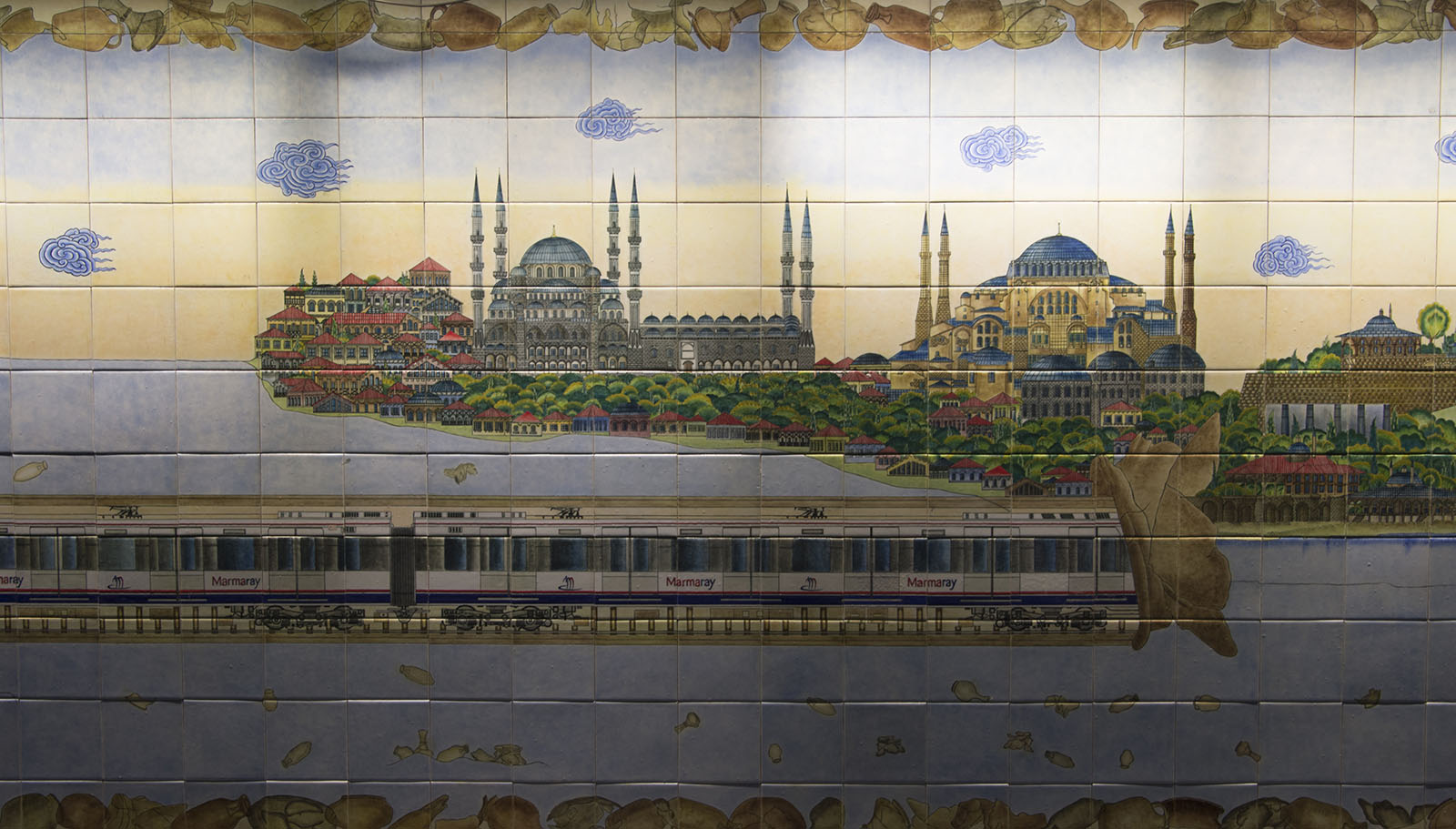
Yenikapı Metro station Marmaray impression

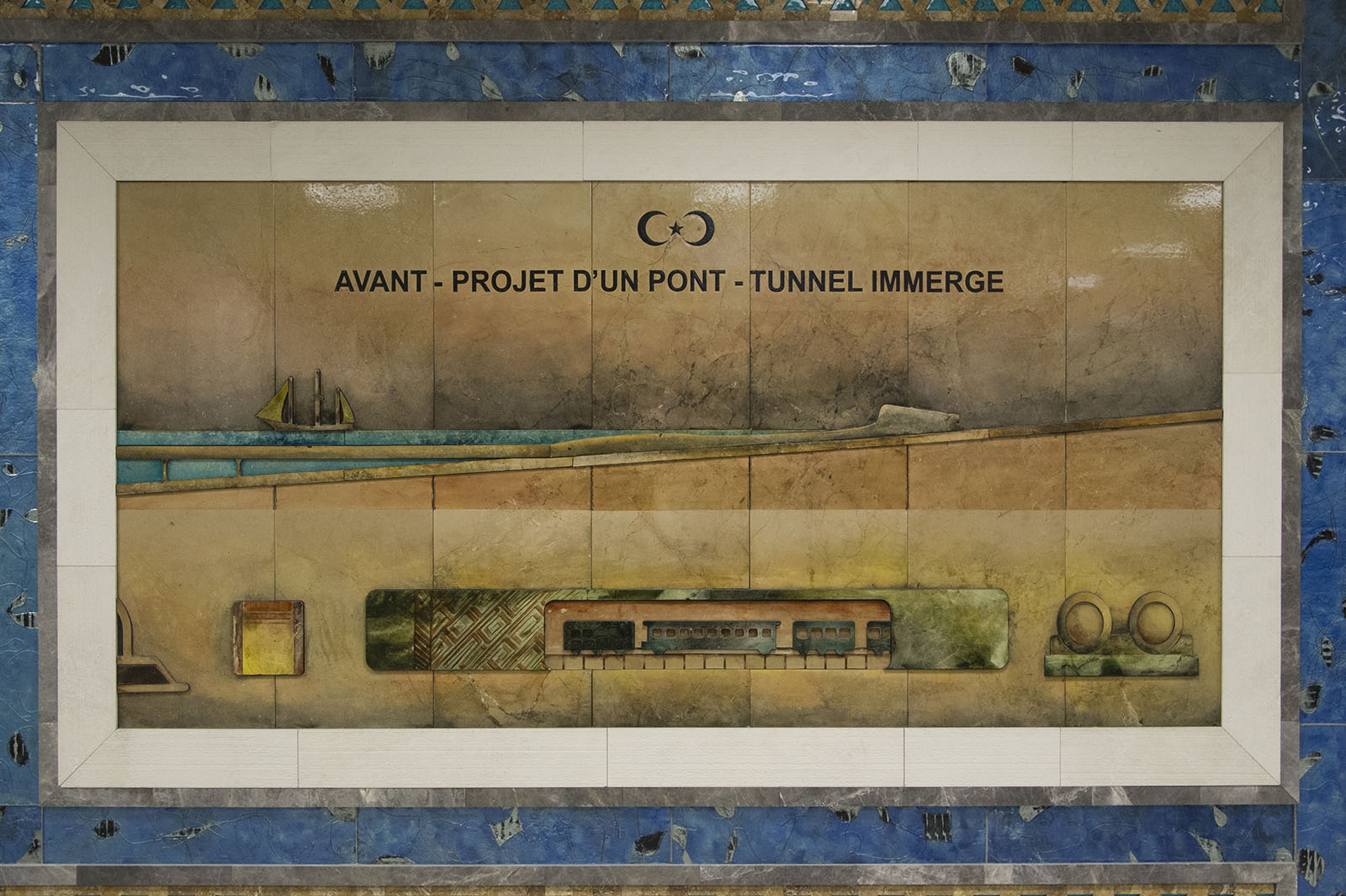
Yenikapı Metro station Tiles of tunnel plans

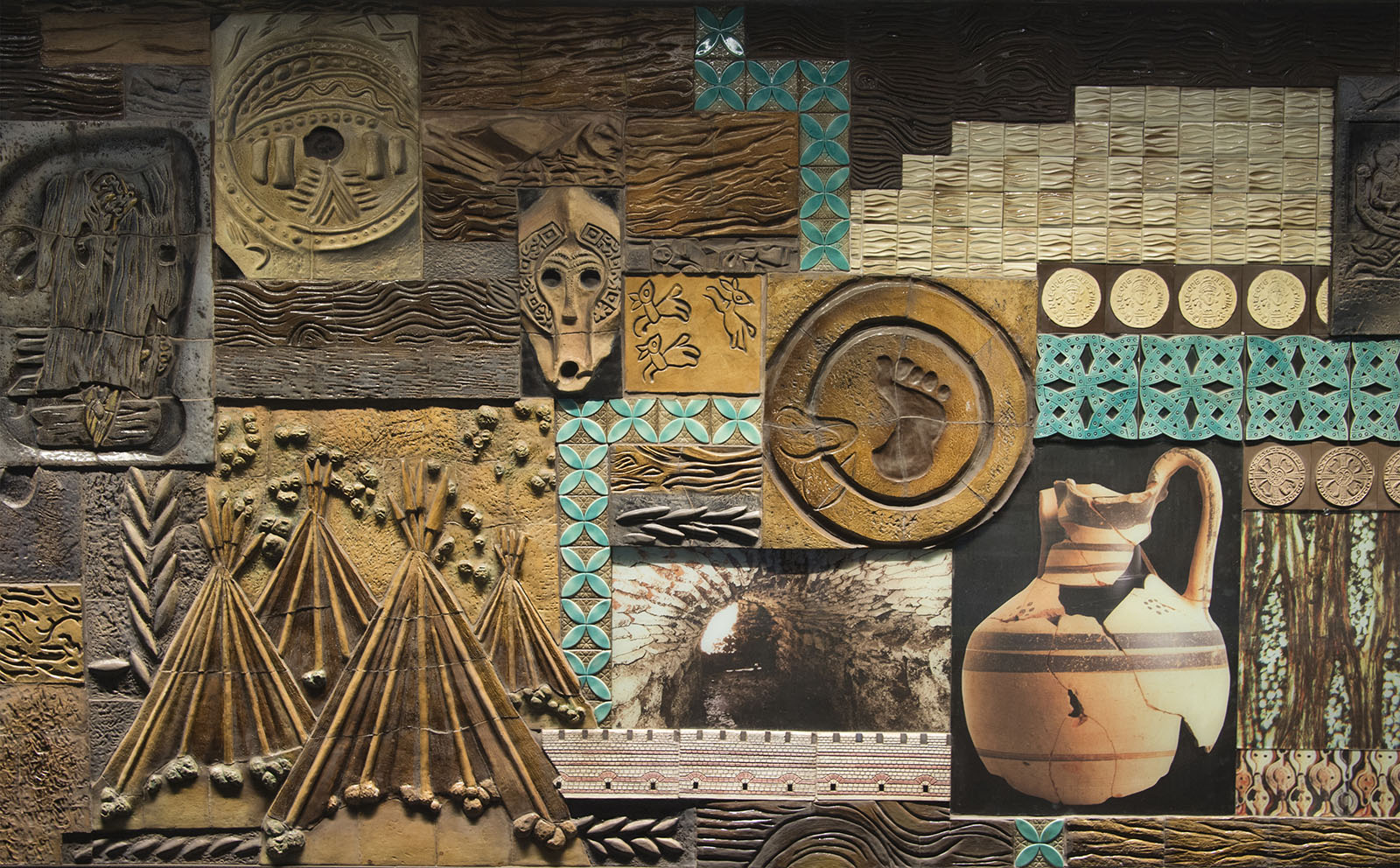
Yenikapı metro station Tiles

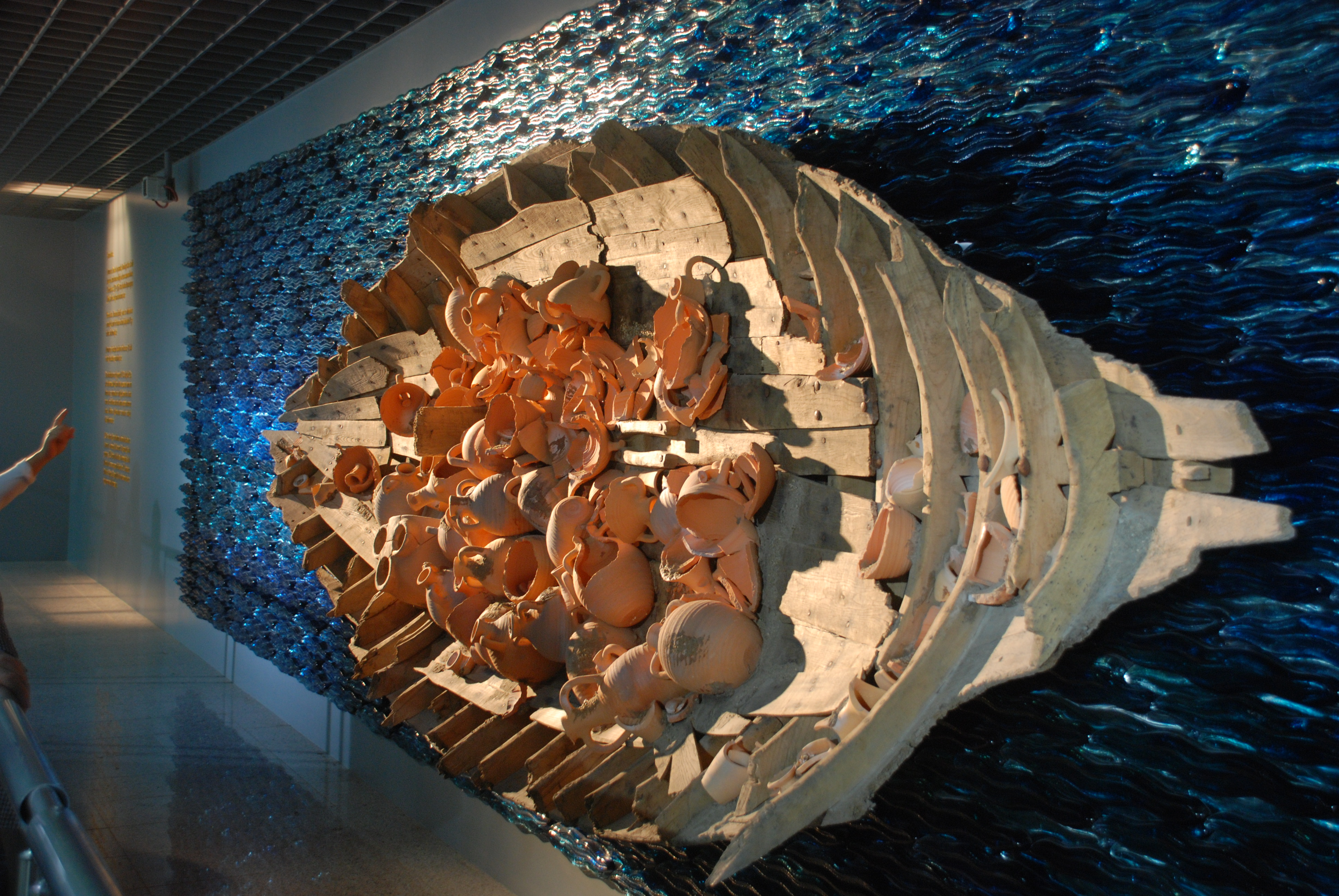
Yenikapı TCDD station Archaeological finds

== Metro platforms ==
Yenikapı (M1) Yenikapı (M2)
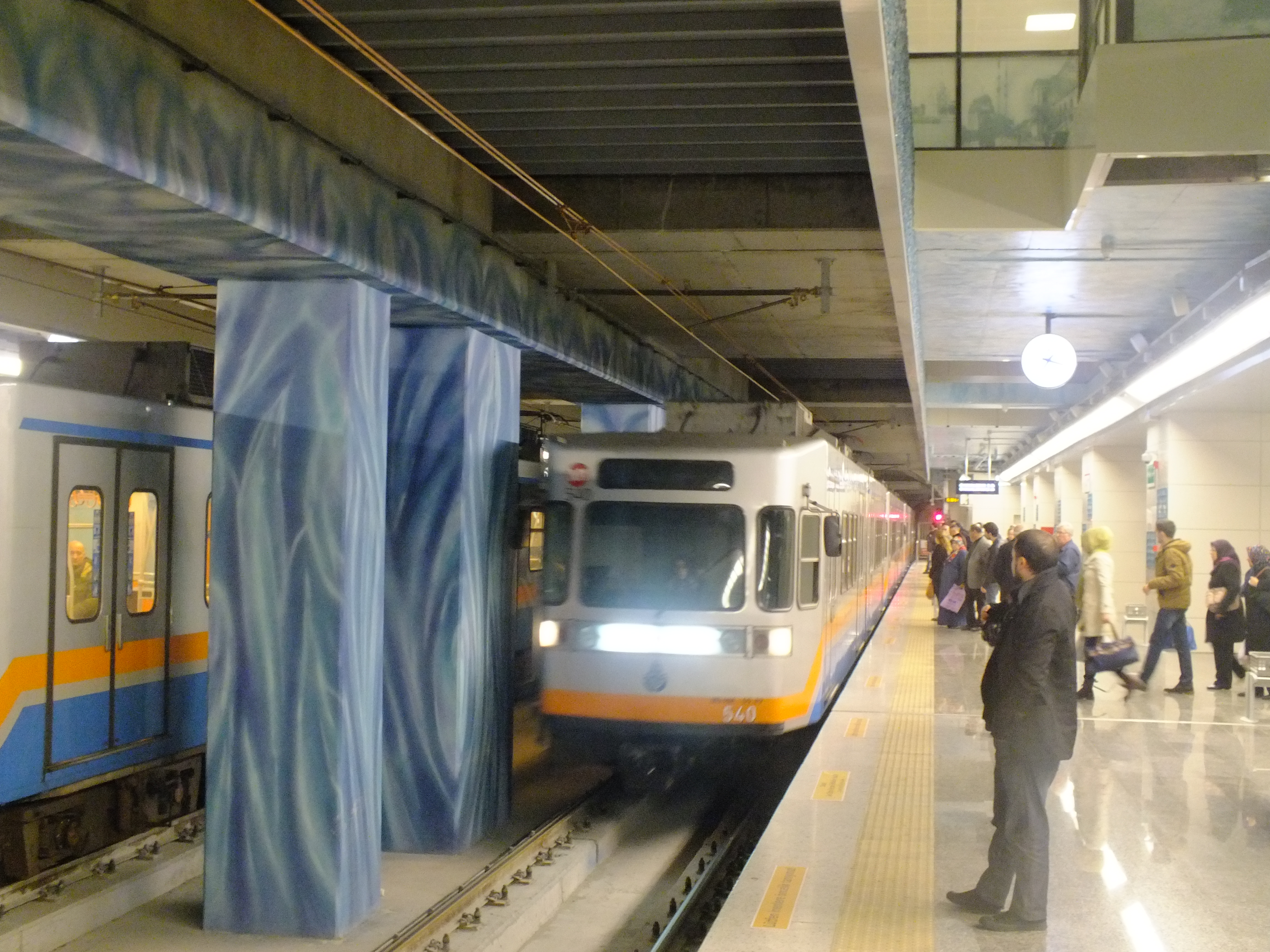
- M1ᴀ train from Atatürk Airport arriving on track 1.

General information
- System: Istanbul Metro rapid transit station
- Owner: Istanbul Metropolitan Municipality
- Lines: M1ᴀ; M1ʙ; M2
- Platforms: 2 side platforms (M1); 2 island platforms (M2)
- Tracks: 2 (M1); 3 (M2)
- Connections: İDO at Yenikapı Terminal; İETT Bus: 30D, 31, 31Y, 50Y, 70FY, 70KY, 72YT, 76A, 77, 88A, 146T, 336Y, BN1; Istanbul Dolmus: Taksim-Bakırköy, Taksim-Florya, Taksim-Yenibosna, Taksim-Yeşilköy

Construction
- Structure type: Underground
- Parking: 400 spaces
- Accessible: Yes

History
- Opened: 15 February 2014; 12 years ago (M2); 9 November 2014; 11 years ago (M1A, M1B)
- Electrified: 750 V DC Overhead line (M1); 750 V DC Third rail (M2)

Services
Preceding station	Istanbul Metro	Following station
Aksaray towards Atatürk Havalimanı	M1a Line	Terminus
Aksaray towards Kirazlı	M1b Line	Terminus
Terminus	M2 Line	Vezneciler towards Hacıosman
Location

=== M1 ===
The M1 platform is the newest part of the Yenikapı complex, completed in November 2014. It is the eastern terminal station for the M1 line and has two side platforms serviced by two tracks. M1ᴀ service departs from track 1 to Atatürk Havalimanı (Atatürk Airport) while M1ʙ service departs from track 2 to Kirazlı.

==== Layout ====
Side platform, doors will open on the right
Track 2	← toward Kirazlı (Aksaray)
Track 1	← toward Atatürk Havalimanı (Aksaray)
Side platform, doors will open on the left

=== M2 ===
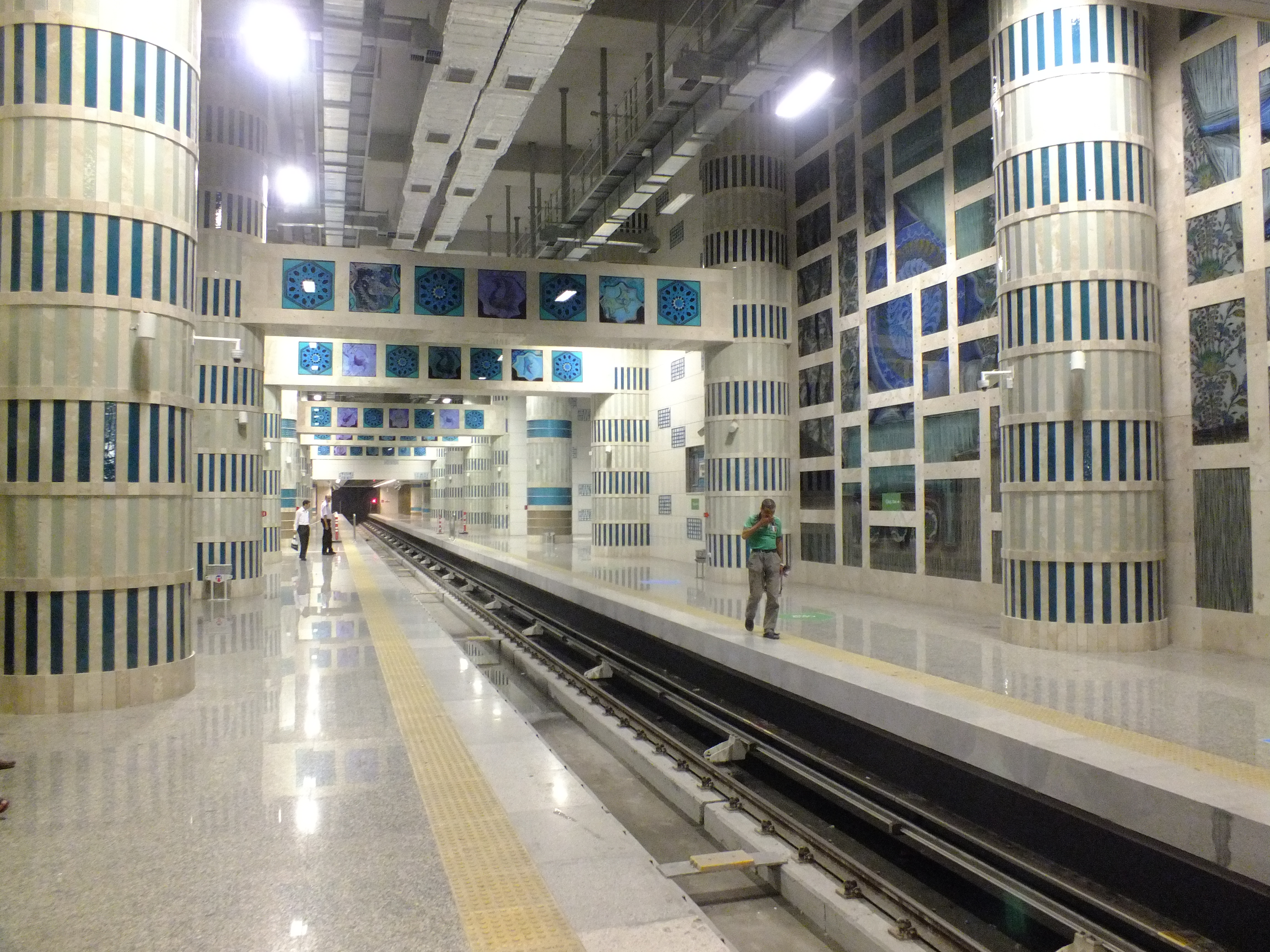
The center track on which most M2 trains arrive and depart.

The M2 platforms were opened on 15 February 2014 and is the southern terminus of the M2 line. Having three tracks and two island platforms along with a high ceiling, it is the largest station in the complex. Most trains use the center track while the Spanish solution method of boarding and alighting is used via the two island platforms. The walls and pillars are decorated with transparent Turquoise tiles and other ceramics. Escalators lead up to the station lobby and are adjacent to the escalators to the Marmaray platform.

==== Layout ====
Track 2	No passenger service
Island platform, currently unused
Track 3	← termination platform
Island platform, doors will open on the left
Track 1	toward Hacıosman (Vezneciler) →

== Marmaray platform ==
Yenikapı
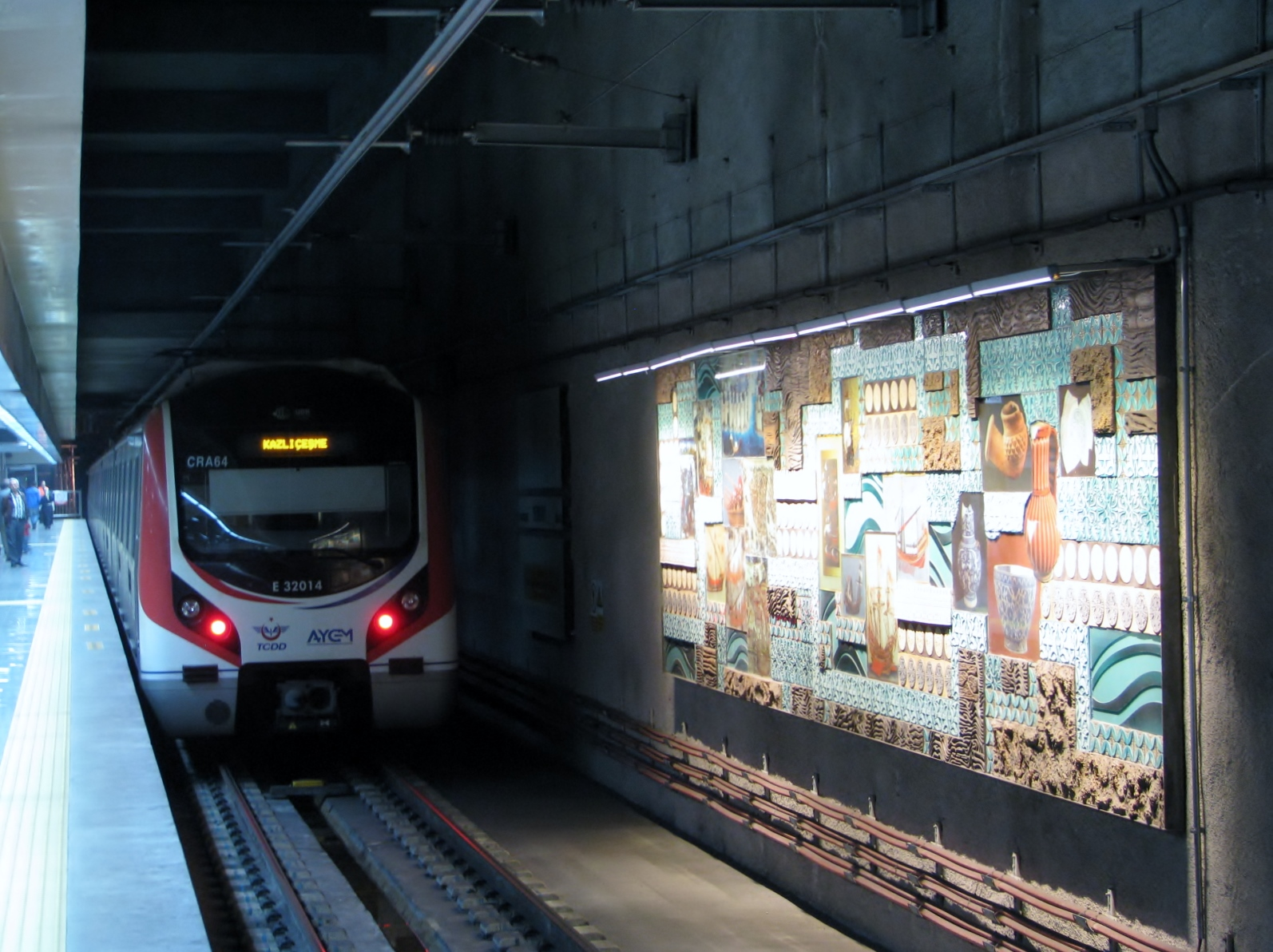
- A westbound train departing the station.

General information
- System: TCDD Taşımacılık commuter rail station
- Owner: Turkish State Railways
- Line: Marmaray Tunnel
- Platforms: 1 island platform
- Tracks: 2
- Connections: İDO at Yenikapı Terminal; İETT Bus: 30D, 31, 31Y, 50Y, 70FY, 70KY, 72YT, 76A, 77, 88A, 146T, 336Y, BN1, Istanbul Dolmus: Taksim-Bakırköy, Taksim-Florya, Taksim-Yenibosna, Taksim-Yeşilköy

Construction
- Structure type: Underground
- Accessible: Yes

History
- Opened: 29 October 2013
- Electrified: 25 kV, 50 Hz AC Overhead line

Passengers
- 2017: 50,615 Average daily ridership

Services
Preceding station	TCDD Taşımacılık	Following station
Kazlıçeşme towards Halkalı	Marmaray	Sirkeci towards Gebze
Location

The Turkish State Railways (TCDD) services Yenikapı via an island platform on the trans-Bosphorus Marmaray rail tunnel. This portion, opened on 29 October 2013, was the first part of the complex that was opened to the public. Trains run between Kazlıçeşme (west of Yenikapı) and Ayrılık Çeşmesi (east of Yenikapı, on the Asian side) within 10-minute intervals. Once the rehabilitation of the existing rail lines are complete, Marmaray commuter service will run west to Halkalı and east to Gebze. This service is expected to commence in 2016.

Construction of the Marmaray tunnel started in 2004 and was expected to open in April 2009. However, due to several important archaeological discoveries at Yenikapı, the opening was delayed until October 2013.

Yenikapı saw 1.4 million boardings in February 2017, making it the busiest station on the Marmaray system as well as making up 29% of all passenger boardings on the line.

=== Layout ===
Track 1	→ ← Marmaray toward Zeytinburnu or Halkalı
Island platform
Track 2	→ Marmaray toward Maltepe or Gebze →
