= Serçe Limanı Shipwreck =

11th-century Mediterranean shipwreck

Serçe Limani Shipwreck
- Serçe Limani is Turkish for "Sparrow Harbor"
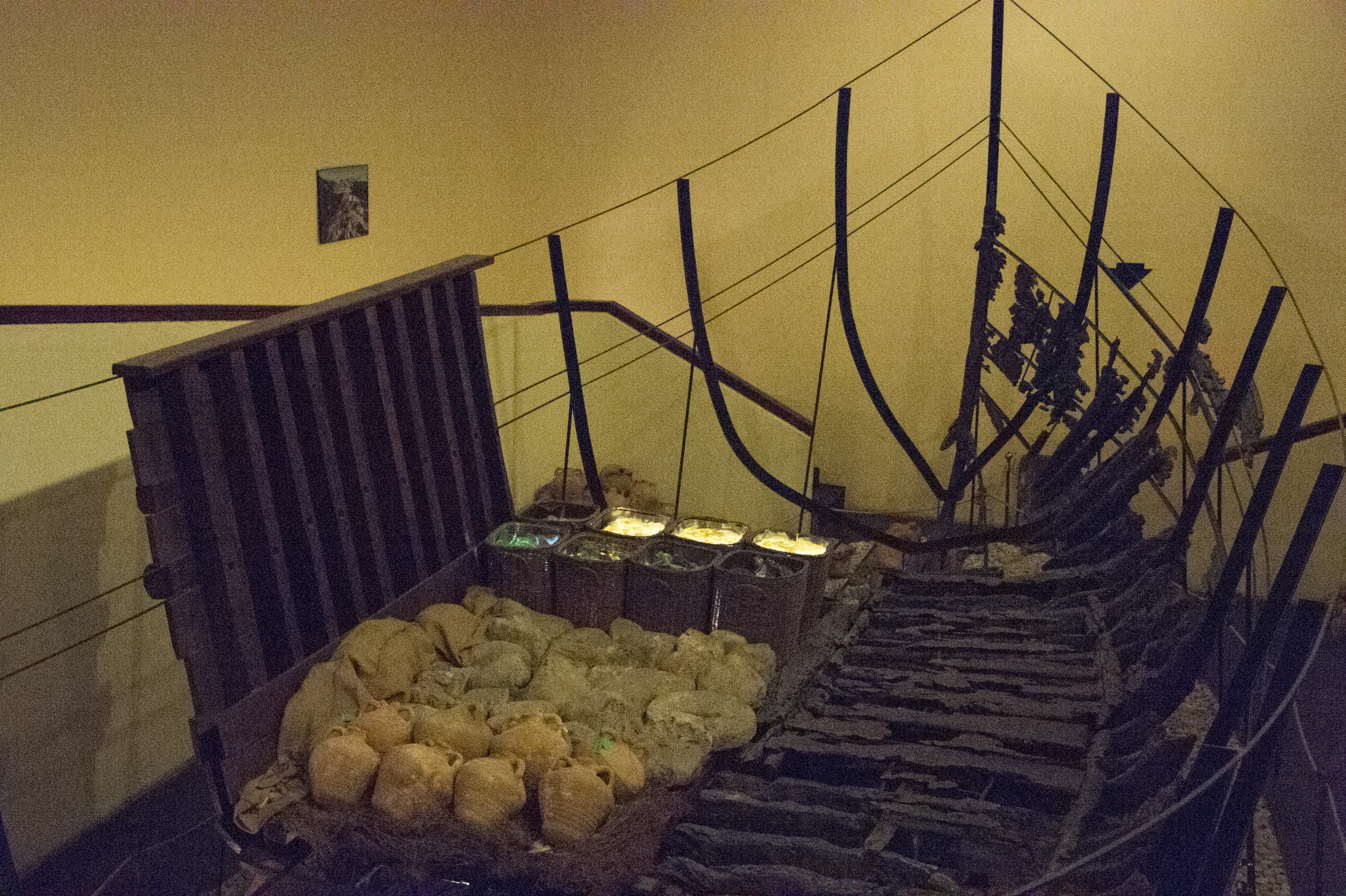
- Remains of the ship in Bodrum Museum

- Location within Turkey Location within Greece
- 36°34′25″N 28°03′08″E
- Type: Site of a sunken ship
- Associated with: Crew of the merchant vessel

Site notes
- Excavation dates: Excavation 1977-1979
- Condition: Conservation, sampling and study are ongoing
- Owner: Republic of Turkey
- Management: Institute of Nautical Archaeology
- Public access: Objects may be viewed in the exhibit at the Bodrum Museum of Underwater Archaeology
- Website: nauticalarch.org/projects/serce-limani-shipwreck-excavation/

The Serçe Limani Shipwreck or Glass Shipwreck is a shipwreck discovered in the Serçe Limani bay, southwest coast of Turkey, opposing Rhodes, in the Mediterranean Sea. The shipwreck was discovered by Donald Frey during an individual dive. Other finds from the area include a third century Hellenistic Shipwreck discovered in 1973 by sponge diver Mehmet Askin.

== The Ship ==
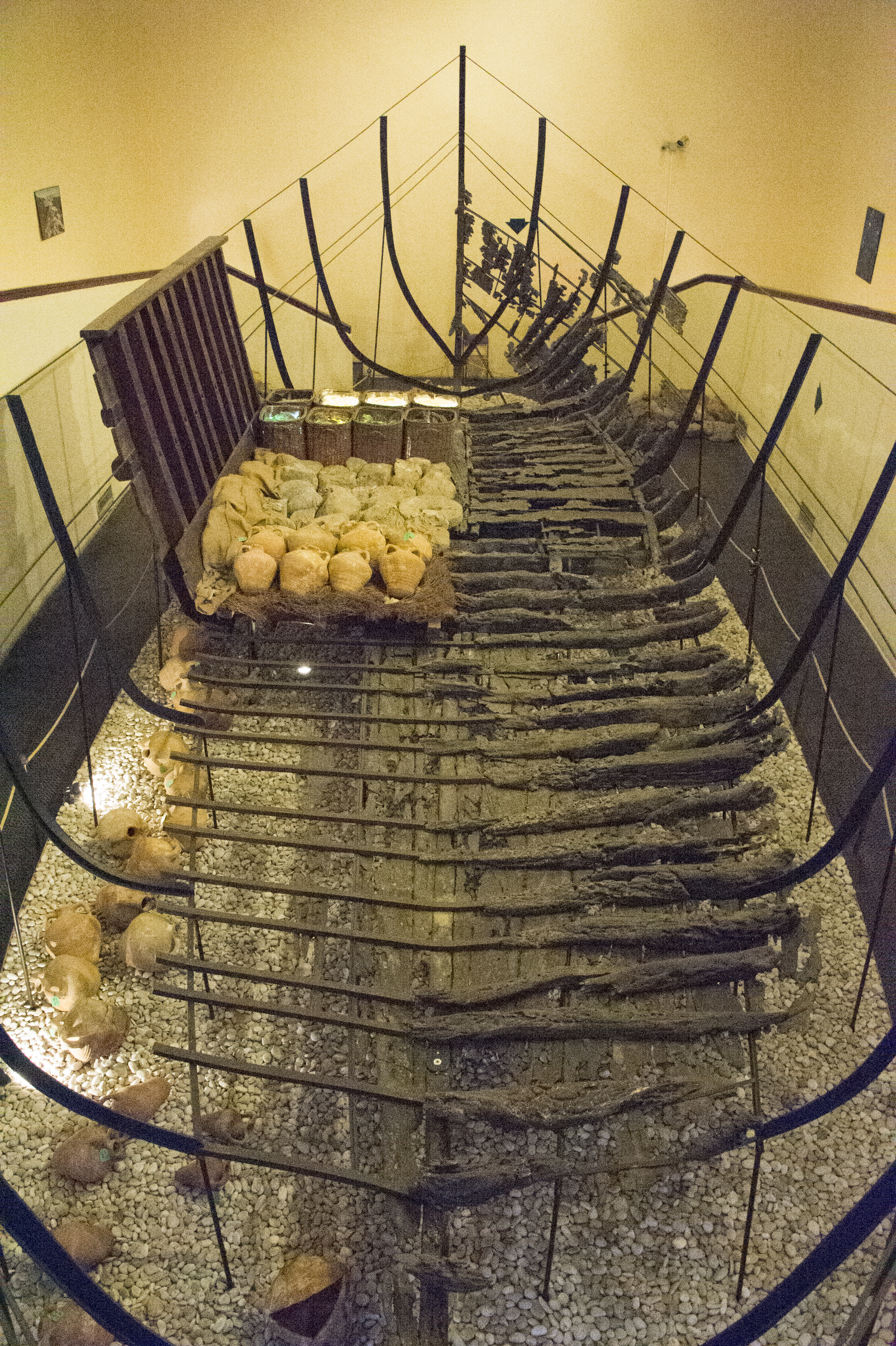
Remains of the ship in Bodrum museum

It was a merchant ship that sailed in c. 1025 AD, probably a Byzantino-Slavic one, with a crew of Hellenized Bulgarians, going to the eastern Mediterranean shore. Institute of Nautical Archaeology describes the ship as "a small two-masted vessel with lateen sails. The mainmast was stepped slightly aft of amidships, and the foremast, with a somewhat smaller sail, had probably raked forward over the bow. The ship had an overall length of perhaps only 50 Byzantine feet (15 m) and a breadth of 17 Byzantine feet (5.3 m)."

Nearly 20% of the hull survived, much in "fragmentary condition".

The hull displays some of the earliest evidence for frame-first construction in which at least some of the frame elements were attached to the keel with iron nails before the planking. Then, strakes of planking were nailed to the framing. The Serçe Limani ship possessed no planking edge joinery like the mortise and tenon common to Mediterranean plank-first ships of centuries past.

Another first for Serçe Limani ship was its keelson that was the first true keelson to be attached to the keel. Previous structures akin to a keelson were constructed in pairs or were left unattached.

== Cargo ==
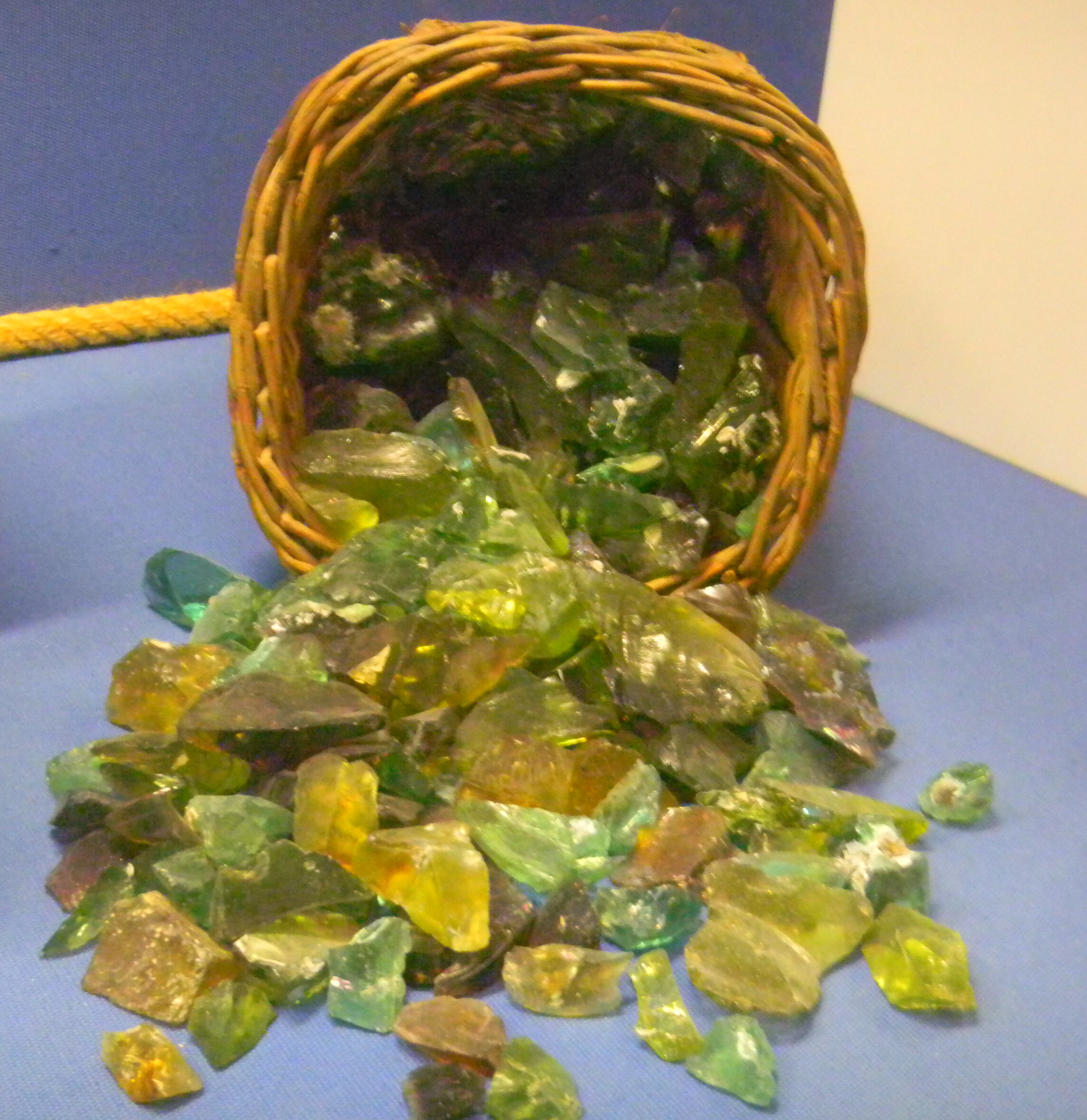
Cullet from the ship

The ship carried various goods, its cargo and wreck described as

3 metric tons of cullet (including a ton of broken Islamic vessels), some eighty pieces of intact glassware, nearly four dozen glazed Islamic bowls, approximately four dozen red-ware cooking vessels, half a dozen copper cauldrons and buckets, and sumac and raisins from a port within the Fatimid caliphate. ... Its iron shank snapped, perhaps from a sudden gust of the wind that is still funneled unexpectedly, but with gale force, down through the surrounding valleys. Suddenly adrift, the ship crashed onto the nearby rocky shore and sank.

The shipwreck is often called the Glass Shipwreck because of many glass pieces found on the site. The glassware found was used as a ballast; glass cullet weighted two tons and "broken glassware and glass-making waste from some Islamic glass factory on the Fatimid Syrian coast" weighted one ton. The number of pieces was estimated as "between half a million and a million shards of broken glassware recovered from the wreck belonging to between 10,000 and 20,000 vessels".

Ceramics found at the site was analyzed and is thought to be from Beirut.

== Hellenistic shipwreck ==
In 1973, another shipwreck was found in the bay. It was a merchant ship, during the excavations of 1978-1980 dozens of Knidian amphoras were found, with "grape seeds and resinous linings in many of them [that] indicate a cargo of wine". As noted by Pulak, Townsend, Koehler, and Wallace:

The amphoras and their stamps suggest that the ship sank ca. 280–275 B.C., providing a date for presumably contemporaneous glazed and plain wares found in the only area of the site excavated to the level of the ship's lead-sheathed hull. Other finds include millstones, marble and lead rings, a wooden toggle, and a length of lead pipe that may provide the earliest evidence for bilge pumps. The excavation was not continued after it was discovered that the wreck runs under a rockslide of massive boulders that might endanger the site if moved.

The wreck is noted for the presence of a lead pipe theorized to be a part of a bilge pump system. Similar lead piping systems were found at later wrecks discovered near Medes and Palamos from the first century BC. If this identification is true, the Hellenistic wreck may possess the earliest known evidence of a bilge pump. However, limited evidence for the use of pumps in this period prevent a solid identification of the type used on the vessel. The earliest direct evidence of a bilge pump does not appear until the seventh century at the Saint Gervais II wreck.

In July 2023, underwater excavations resumed at the site and are currently ongoing. A 3D model of the site was created through photogrammetry.

== Bibliography ==
- Bass, George F.; Matthews, Sheila; Steffy, J. Richard; Doorninck, Frederick H. van (2004). Serçe Limani: An Eleventh-Century Shipwreck Vol. 1, The Ship and Its Anchorage, Crew, and Passengers. Texas A&M University Press. ISBN 978-0-89096-947-2.
- Bass, George F.; Lledo, Berta; Matthews, Sheila; Brill, Robert H. (2009). Serçe Limani, Vol 2: The Glass of an Eleventh-Century Shipwreck. Texas A&M University Press. ISBN 9781603440646.
- Bas, Selcuk; Karakus, Omer; Ceylan, Oguz; Ilki, Alper (2019). "Structural Analysis and Monitoring Suggestions for an 11th Century Shipwreck". Structural Analysis of Historical Constructions. RILEM Bookseries. Vol. 18. Springer International Publishing. pp. 2273–2282. doi:10.1007/978-3-319-99441-3_244. ISBN 978-3-319-99440-6.
