= Aksaray station =

Station of the Istanbul Metro

Aksaray
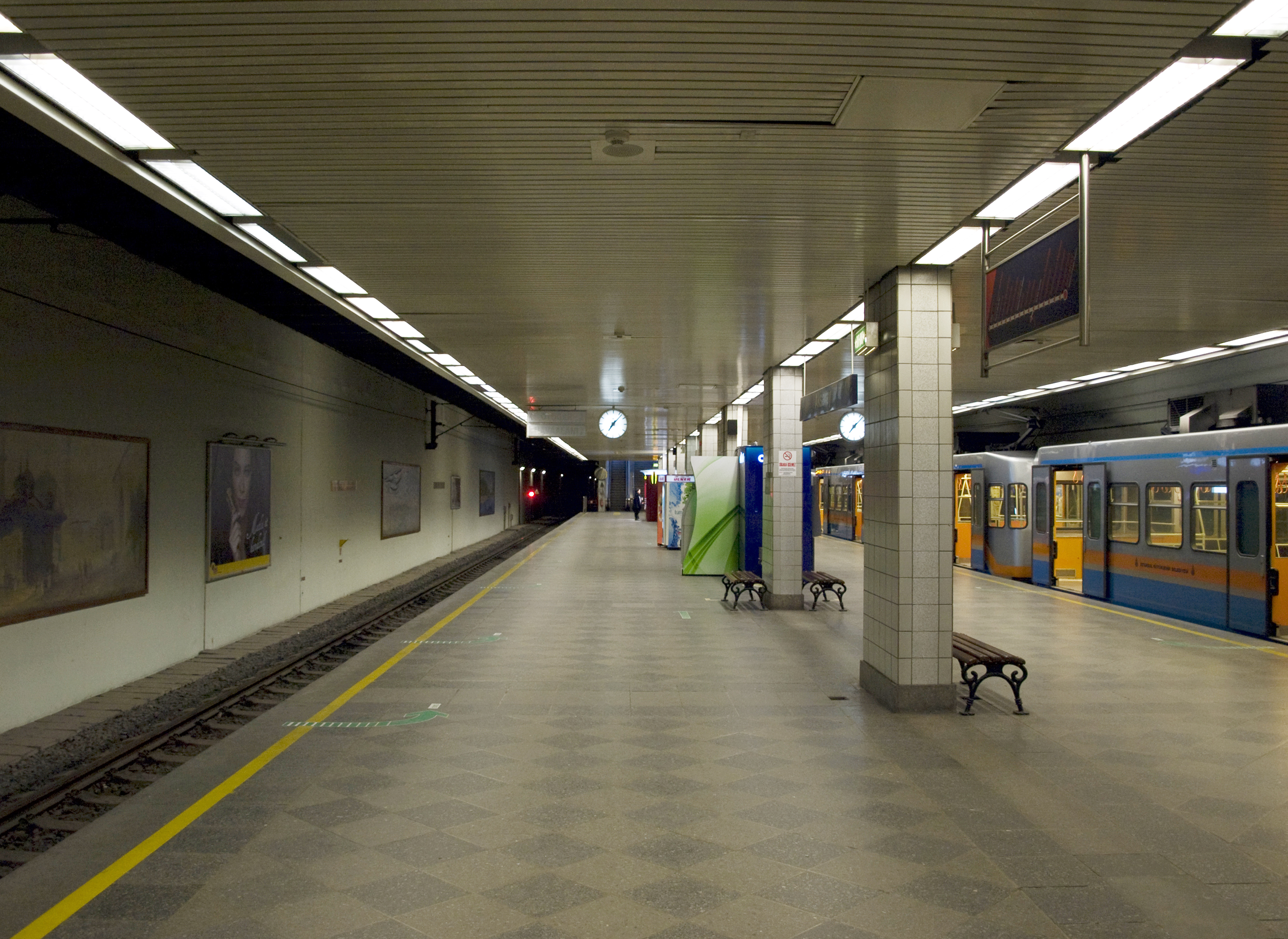

General information
- Location: Adnan Menderes Blv., İskenderpaşa Mah. 34096; Fatih, Istanbul
- Coordinates: 41.0111°N 28.9489°E
- System: Istanbul Metro rapid transit station
- Owner: Istanbul Metropolitan Municipality
- Lines: M1A; M1B
- Platforms: 1 island platform
- Tracks: 2
- Connections: Istanbul Tram: T1 at Yusufpaşa; İETT Bus: 31Y, 32T, 33TE, 38, 38Z, 50Y, 76E, 78, 78H, 79T, 88A, 89T, 90B, 91E, 92A, 97G, 146B, 146T, 336, YH-1; Istanbul Minibus: Aksaray-Güzeltepe, Aksaray-İmar Blokları, Aksaray-Karayolları, Aksaray-Vialand, Aksaray-Yıldıztabya, Pazariçi-Aksaray

Construction
- Structure type: Underground
- Accessible: Yes

History
- Opened: 3 September 1989; 36 years ago
- Electrified: 750 V DC Overhead line

Services
Preceding station	Istanbul Metro	Following station
Emniyet–Fatih towards Atatürk Havalimanı	M1a Line	Yenikapı Terminus
Emniyet–Fatih towards Kirazlı	M1b Line	Yenikapı Terminus
Location

Aksaray is a rapid transit station on the M1 line of the Istanbul Metro. It is located in central Fatih under Adnan Menderes Boulevard near Aksaray square. Aksaray was opened on 3 September 1989 as part of the first rapid transit line in Istanbul and Turkey. Between 1989 and 2014, Aksaray was the eastern terminus of the M1. On 9 November 2014, the M1 was extended 0.8 kilometres (0.50 mi) south to Yenikapı Transfer Center where connections to the M2 line and Marmaray as well as İDO seabus service are available. From Aksaray connection to the T1 tram line is available via a short walk to Yusufpaşa station. Connections to İETT bus service are also available.

== Layout ==
Track 2	← toward Atatürk Havalimanı ← toward Kirazlı
Island platform
Track 1	toward Yenikapı → toward Yenikapı→
