= Yenikapı Ferry Terminal =

Yenikapı Terminal

General information
- Location: Kennedy Cd., Nişanca Mah., 34130; Fatih/Istanbul; Turkey
- Coordinates: 41.0020°N 28.9564°E
- Operator: İDO
- Lines: Yenikapı-Bandırma; Yenikapı-Bursa; Yenikapı-Yalova; Kadıköy-Armutlu-Bursa; Kadıköy-Bursa; Bostancı-Avşa; Bostancı-Esenköy; Bostancı-Bakırköy
- Connections: Istanbul Metro at Yenikapı; TCDD Taşımacılık at Yenikapı; İETT Bus: 71AT, 72YT, 81, BN1, BN2, BN3, YH-1, YT-1

Construction
- Accessible: Yes

History
- Opened: 1989

Services
Preceding station	İDO	Following station
Bandırma Terminus	Yenikapı-Bandırma (Fast Ferry)	Terminus
Bursa Terminus	Yenikapı-Bursa (Fast Ferry)	Terminus
Armutlu T.K. towards Bursa	Kadıköy-Armutlu-Bursa	Kadıköy Terminus
Bursa Terminus	Kadıköy-Bursa	Kadıköy Terminus
Marmara towards Avşa	Bostancı-Avşa	Bostancı Terminus
Avcılar towards Avşa	Bostancı-Avşa (Summers only)	Bostancı Terminus
Çınarcık towards Esenköy	Bostancı-Esenköy	Bostancı Terminus
Bakırköy Terminus	Bostancı-Bakırköy	Kadıköy towards Bostancı
Terminus	Yenikapı-Yalova (Fast Ferry)	Yalova Terminus
Location
- Location within Istanbul

The Yenikapı Ferry Terminal (Turkish: Yenikapı Feribot Terminali) or Yenikapı Pier (Turkish: Yenikapı İskelesi) is a ferry terminal in Fatih, Istanbul, located along Kennedy Avenue on the Marmara Sea. It is used by İDO as a hub and is the largest ferry terminal in Istanbul. İDO operates several ferry routes from Yenikapı to destinations within Istanbul as well as across the Marmara Sea.

The terminal opened in 1989, when İDO began operating ferry service within Istanbul, and was expanded in the mid-2000s. The terminal is located in south-central Fatih, within the Nişanca neighborhood, on the city's historic peninsula. Connections to the Istanbul Metro and Marmaray commuter rail service is available at the Yenikapı Transfer Center, which opened in 2013.

== Overview ==
The terminal is located near the ancient site of the Harbour of Eleutherios, one of the main ports of Constantinople. Adjacent to the terminal, on the west side, is Yenikapı Square; a 673,000 m^{2} (7,240,000 sq ft) artificial park used for political rallies. On the east side of the terminal is the western/European portal of the trans-Bosporus Eurasia Tunnel to Kadıköy.

The terminal itself consists of a main terminal building, a small square with cafes and shops, two parking lots, and a total of 10 ferry slips, four of them for car ferries. The terminal building contains ticket booths, waiting areas and a TAV Primeclass lounge along with cafes and rent-a-car service.

The total area of the Yenikapı Terminal spans around 50,127 m^{2} (539,560 sq ft).

== Services ==
İDO operates eight ferry routes to a total of 13 destinations, three of them in Istanbul. Of these eight routes, three of them are fast-ferry routes, where passenger may bring their automobiles with them. Connection to TCDD Taşımacılık intercity rail service is available in Bandırma, offering a connection from Istanbul to İzmir. Before the opening of the Osman Gazi Bridge, some intercity bus operates used the ferry from Bandırma to Yenikapı on their İzmir to Istanbul service.
