= Kızılburun Column Wreck =

The Kızılburun Column Wreck is a first century BC shipwreck excavated by the Institute of Nautical Archaeology off the west coast of Turkey between 2005 and 2011. The most notable find at the site was eight column drums along with a doric capital which was determined by the excavators to be destined for the Temple of Apollo at Claros.

== Cargo ==
The ship transported a number of recently quarried marble objects which weighed a total of 60 tons. The largest of these were eight column drums and one doric capital arranged in a two by four pattern with the capital on top. The drums remained unfluted which confirms that they were not repurposed from another site. They also differ only vary little in diameter which is in keeping with the taper of a single column. Smaller marble objects include two large basins, two table-like slabs, four rectangular blocks, and a dozen grave markers. Based on Electron Paramagnetic Analysis (EPR), the marble from this vessel was determined to be derived from the quarries on Proconnesus Island in the Sea of Marmara.

== Construction ==
Very little of the wooden hull survives and much of what was preserved was discovered compressed under the set of column drums. However, a portion of the pine keel measuring less than 3m survived as well as a number of pieces of hull planking and framing. Hull planking included the use of pegged mortise-and-tenon joints which corresponds with shell first vessels from this period. These tenons were made of oak in keeping with the practice of Hellenistic shipwrights. The use of double clenching on nail fasteners is also characteristic of contemporaneous ship building. Based on comparison with other vessels of its type, the Kızılburun vessel was most likely 4.5 to 5 m in breadth and 18 to 20 m in length with a displacement of at least 90 tons.
