= Bozburun Byzantine Shipwreck =

Bozburun Shipwreck
- Dimensions: 14.25 m (47 ft) in length, 5.1 m (17 ft) in beam
- Year of Construction: AD 874 (dendrochronology)
- Construction: Mixed construction, planks edge joined with dowels

The Bozburun Shipwreck is a Middle Byzantine merchant vessel discovered by Turkish sponge diver Mehmet Askin in 1973 off the Bozburun Peninsula in Turkey, and excavated by the Institute of Nautical Archaeology beginning in 1995. Based on dendrochronology, the wood from the ship was dated to AD 874.

== Construction and Cargo ==
The vessel is the first archaeological evidence of the use of coaked dowels during the Byzantine Period in the transition between shell first mortise-and-tenon construction and frame first construction. Later finds at the Theodosian Harbor in modern Yenikapi, Istanbul further support the usage of this method of construction in Byzantine ships. Oak was used for the keel, posts, floor timbers amidships, some futtocks, and most planking. A lack of amphorae at a point on the starboard side near the stern indicates the location of a galley with a set of ten cooking pots, two collar stands, and tiles for the hearth.

The Bozburun ship carried an estimated 1300 amphorae which match types made at kilns in Cherson, Crimea. The total weight of this cargo is estimated to be 20-25 tons. At least 62 amphorae were discovered with intact bark stoppers. The contents of these amphorae were analyzed and believed to be red wine or grape must. Several pottery marks with h. ΕΠ,ΕΠΙС, or ΕΠΙСΚΟ indicate that the wine was destined for use by a bishop.
