= Institute of Nautical Archaeology =

World's oldest institution for the study of archaeology at sea

The Institute of Nautical Archaeology (INA) is an organization devoted to the study of humanity's interaction with the sea through the practice of archaeology. It is the world’s oldest organization devoted to the study of nautical archaeology.

== History ==
INA's founder Dr. George Bass pioneered the science of underwater excavation in the 1960s through work at Cape Gelidonya and other ancient shipwreck sites off the coast of Turkey. Since then, INA has expanded its scope and activities to work globally on shipwrecks and submerged sites. In 1976, the affiliation of INA with Texas A&M University in College Station, Texas gave rise to the graduate Nautical Archaeology Program there. Hundreds of archaeologists have received their training at Texas A&M and today, after more than four decades of the Nautical Archaeology Program's existence.

INA is a not-for-profit group founded in 1972 and recognized by the U.S. Government in 1973. Today it has members all over the world and counts among them professional archaeologists, students, and many others from all walks of life.

== Mission ==
INA's mission is to bring history to light through the science of shipwrecks. INA's members apply standards of science and art to locating, excavating, recording, preserving, and publishing shipwrecks and other archaeological sites of maritime significance all over the world. They do so to add to humanity's understanding of seafaring's role in the development of civilization. Three-quarters of the earth is covered by water, and in the fabric of human history, the most pervasive thread is our association with the planet's oceans, rivers and lakes.

The Institute of Nautical Archaeology works for the public to share what nautical archaeologists do, with anyone with an interest. INA is also committed to the preservation of the world's shipwrecks and other archaeological sites, but specifically to finding the most significant sites and excavating them to unlock their secrets.

INA's professional and volunteer members and affiliates have conducted fieldwork in Africa, Asia, Australia, the Americas, and Europe. They have worked on the world's oldest known shipwrecks, and on wrecks as recent as World War II. Their work has improved the understanding of ancient trade in the Mediterranean, the development of the ship, shipbuilding in the Ancient World, the saga of European expansion into the New World, and wars for the control of the Americas.

== Projects ==
- Albania Ancient Shipwreck Project (Albania)
- Anaxum River Shipwreck Survey (Italy)
- Aksumite-Period Shipwreck Excavation (Eritrea)
- Azores Shipwreck Survey (Portugal)
- B-24 Tulsamerican Survey (Croatia)
- Bahrain Survey (Bahrain)
- Bajo de la Campana Iron Age Shipwreck Excavation (Spain)
- Battle of Bạch Đằng Research Project (Vietnam)
- Bay of Lagos Survey (Portugal)
- Bozburun Byzantine Shipwreck Excavation (Turkey)
- Burgaz Harbors Research Project (Turkey)
- Cape Gelidonya Late Bronze Age Shipwreck Excavation (Turkey)
- City Point Shipwreck Survey (United States)
- Civil War Blockade Runner Denbigh Excavation (United States)
- Clydesdale Plantation 18th-Century Sloop Excavation (United States)
- Danaos Deep-Water Survey (Crete)
- Easter Island Survey
- Eastern Cyprus Maritime Survey (Cyprus)
- Ertuğrul Ottoman Frigate Excavation (Japan)
- Finisterre Shipwreck Survey (Spain)
- Fournoi Underwater Survey (Greece)
- Gaspé Bay Historic Shipwreck Survey (Canada)
- Gnalić Shipwreck Excavation (Croatia)
- Godavaya Ancient Shipwreck Excavation (Sri Lanka)
- Highborne Cay Iberian Shipwreck Survey
- HMS Solebay Research Project (West Indies)
- Ioppa Maritima Survey (Israel)
- Kekova Survey (Turkey)
- Kızılburun Column Wreck Excavation (Turkey)
- Kumluca Bronze Age Shipwreck Excavation (Turkey)
- Kyrenia Shipwreck Excavation (Cyprus)
- Marzamemi Maritime Heritage Project (Sicily)
- Mazarron Timber Research Project (Spain)
- Molasses Reef Iberian Shipwreck Excavation (Molasses Reef)
- Monte Cristi Shipwreck Excavation (Dominican Republic)
- Novy Svet Wreck Research Project (Ukraine)
- Pabuç Burnu Shipwreck Excavation (Turkey)
- Port Royal Harbor Excavation (Jamaica)
- Red River Steamboat Heroine Excavation (United States)
- Revolutionary War Privateer Defence Excavation (United States)
- Rockley Bay Research Project (Tobago)
- Ronson Ship Excavation (United States)
- Santo Antonio de Tanna Shipwreck Excavation (Kenya)
- Secca di Capistello Shipwreck Survey (Italy)
- Serçe Limanı Shipwreck Excavation (Turkey)
- Şeytan Deresi Shipwreck Survey (Turkey)
- Shelburne Shipyard Steamboat Graveyard Research Project (United States)
- Ship Biscuit and Salted Beef Research Project (Trans-Atlantic)
- Steamboat Anthony Wayne Research Project (United States)
- Steamboat Phoenix Research Project (United States)
- Sub Marine Explorer Survey (Panama)
- Tantura Lagoon Research Project (Israel)
- Tektaş Burnu Classical Greek Shipwreck Excavation (Turkey)
- The Twelve Apostles Research Project (Spain)
- Uluburun Late Bronze Age Shipwreck Excavation (Turkey)
- Warwick Research Project (Bermuda)
- Western Ledge Reef Wreck Research Project (Bermuda)
- Yassi Ada Byzantine Shipwreck Excavation (Turkey)
- Yassi Ada Roman Shipwreck Excavation (Turkey)
- Yenikapı Byzantine Shipwrecks Project (Turkey)
- Yukon River Steamboat Survey
