= Saint Gervais II wreck =

Seventh century shipwreck

The Saint Gervais II Shipwreck is a seventh century shipwreck discovered off Fos-sur-mer in 1978 during harbor dredging operations. The vessel has been argued to be an early example of frame first construction, preceded only Yassiada 1 Wreck. The vessel is of interest for its bilge pump which is possibly the earliest example yet discovered. Other objects of note are African Spatheion-type amphorae, a Merovingian buckle plate, and a follis minted in Carthage bearing the portrait of the Byzantine Emperor Heraclius dated to 611/2. However, much of the material culture was salvaged at the time of the sinking. The bulk transportation of wheat was discovered from it preservation in pitch spilt from amphorae.
