= Yenikapı =

Quarter in Istanbul, Turkey

Coordinates: 41°00′N 28°57′E

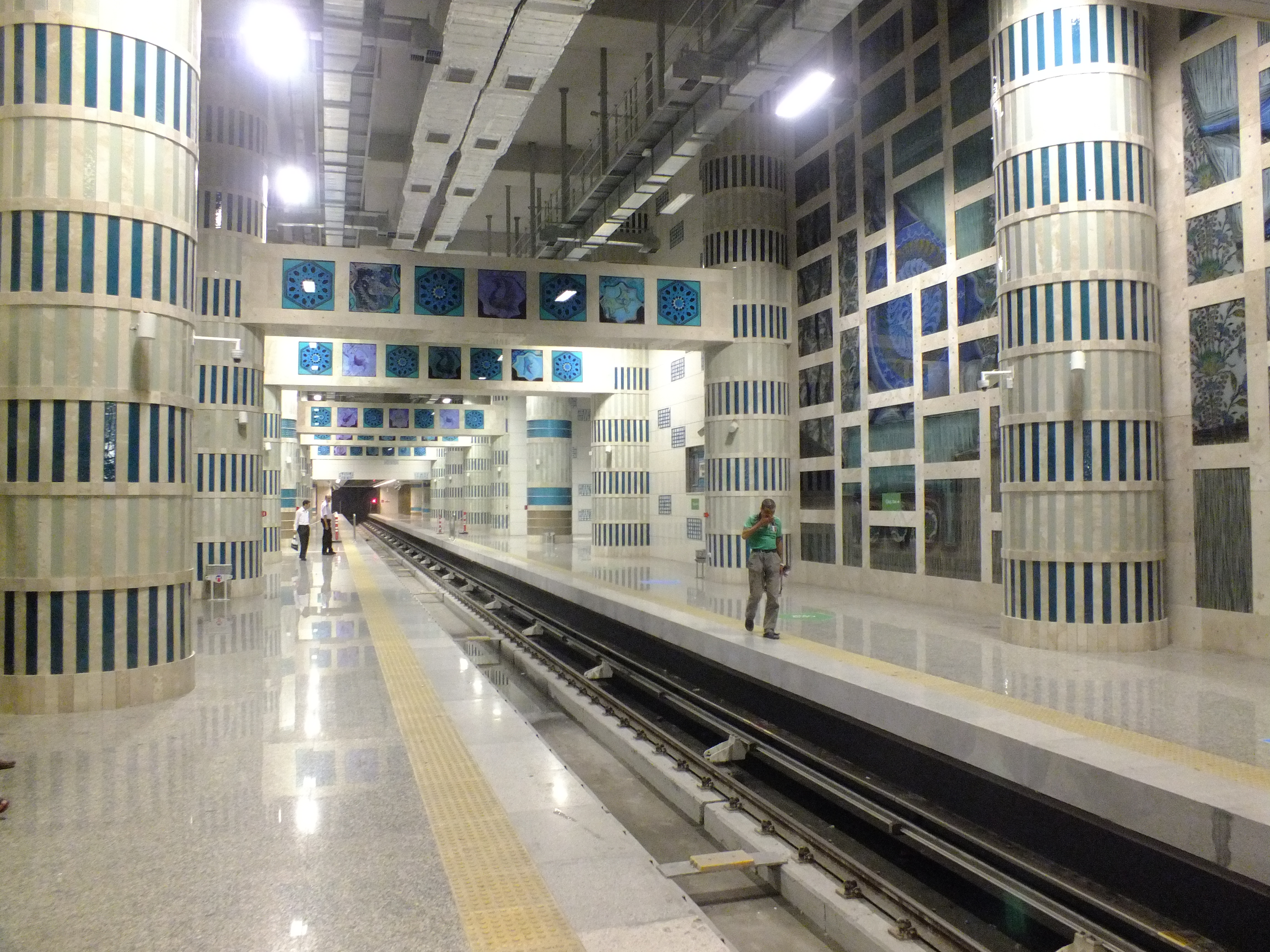
Center track of M2 platform of Yenikapı station.

Yenikapı (Turkish pronunciation: ['jenikapɯ]; lit. 'New Gate') is a port and a quarter in Istanbul, Turkey, in the metropolitan district of Fatih on the European side of the Bosphorus, and along the southern shore of the city's historically central peninsula.

Yenikapı is notable for the ongoing excavations on its Byzantine port, first discovered in 2004. Yenikapı’s archeological investigations have become one of the largest in Europe, due to the size and number of the shipwrecks found since the initial discovery, and the large number of associated artefacts. The commercial harbor, called the Harbour of Theodosius, in use between the 5th and the 10th centuries, was an alternative to Constantinople's traditional berths situated along the inlet of the Golden Horn.

The Yenikapı Square is an artificial piece of land created on the Sea of Marmara, enlarging Yenikapı. It is used for large gatherings, particularly pro-Erdoğan political rallies, and events such as the Ethnosport Cultural Festival.

== Transportation ==
The Yenikapı Transfer Center is also the site of an underground mass rapid transit terminal, the construction of which was delayed by the massive excavations necessary for the project. The new Yenikapı terminal provides interchanges between the Hafif Metro (M1) line and the M2 line — both of which constitute part of the Istanbul Metro network — and the new Marmaray railway link connecting the Anatolian and European sides of the city through a new tunnel under the Bosporus.

Yenikapı is also a station on the İstanbul-Halkalı suburban railway line.

== Archaeology ==
8,000-year-old skeletons were discovered, and with the continuous excavations, further graves have been unearthed. The graves reveal that Istanbul used to be home to the earliest settlements during the Stone Age. The skeletons were found in four prehistoric graves.

Further excavation of the site revealed 34 sunken ships dating between the seventh and eleventh centuries AD. Vessels of this type from the Byzantine Period display characteristics of both shell-first and frame-first construction. The Yenikapi ships display a transition from the use of unpegged mortise-and-tenon joints as fasteners for the lower strakes to using coaks by around AD 900. Coaking was only present on one Byzantine shipwreck before the discovery found off Bozburun. The Yenikapi round ships are a clear break from the classical tradition of ship building which form a wine glass hull with alternating half frames and floor timbers. Instead the round ships of the Byzantine Period are flat-floored with inline framing. The sunken ships have been conserved at the Istanbul University and the Institute of Nautical Archaeology in Bodrum.

There were also remnants of some walls found during the excavations. They are now considered to be the first city walls of Constantinople, erected when the city was founded as Byzantion.

About 500 pieces taken from the relics unearthed during the Marmaray excavations were exhibited at the Istanbul Archeology Museum.

In order to provide an adequate urban and architectural design for the archaeological site, an international design competition was organized in 2012, with the project by Peter Eisenman and Aytac Architects eventually selected as the winning proposal. The project also envisages the realization of an archeo-park and a large archaeological museum.

In 2020, archaeologists discovered animals remains and skeletons, including cats, dating back to the Byzantine period.

== Resources ==
- "La Turquie s'intéresse à son archéologie" (in French). La Croix. 2008-01-04.
- "A never-ending story of Istanbul's 8,500-year history". Hurriyet. 2009-02-01. Archived from the original on 2019-12-16.
