= İDO =

Ferry operator in Istanbul

Istanbul Fast Ferries Co. Inc. İDO
- Type: Public
- Industry: Transport
- Founded: 1987
- Headquarters: Istanbul, Turkey
- Key people: Murat Orhan, General Manager
- Website: http://www.ido.com.tr

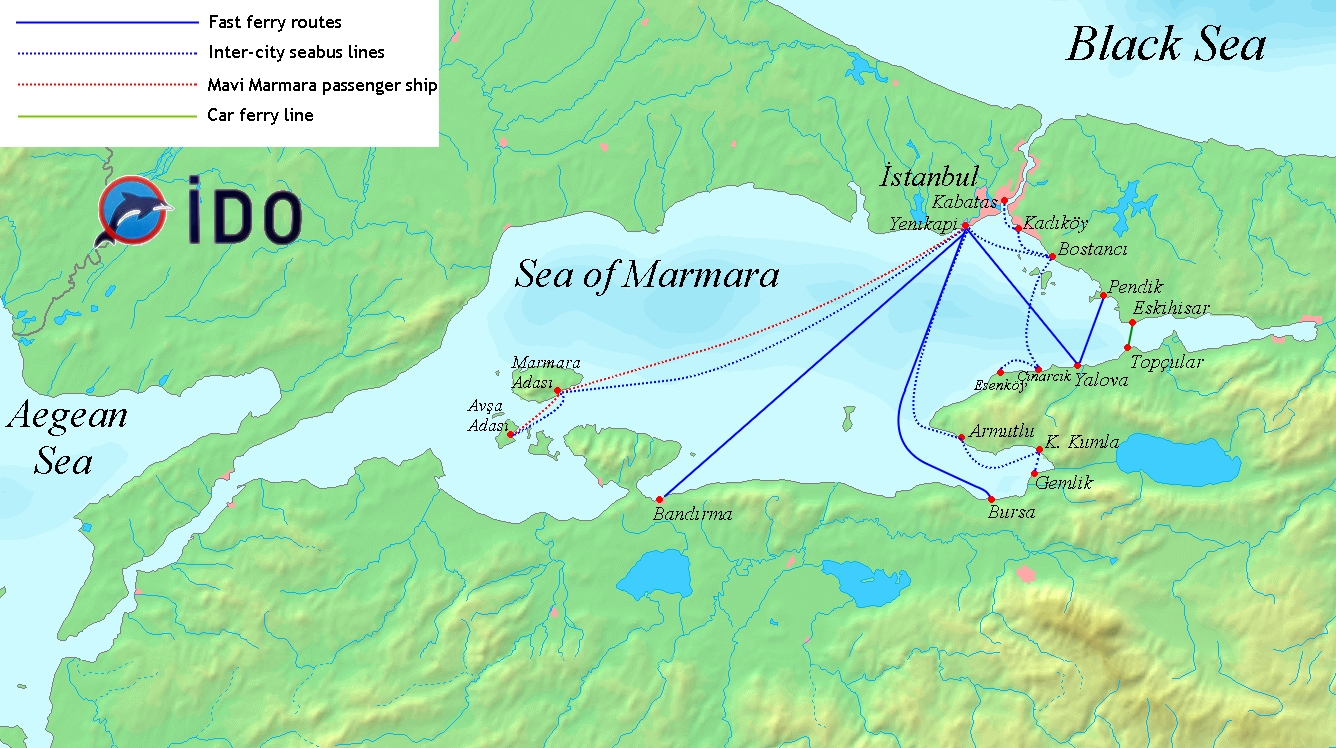
Routes operated by the İDO in the Sea of Marmara

İDO Istanbul Fast Ferries Co. Inc. (Turkish: İstanbul Deniz Otobüsleri, meaning Istanbul Sea Buses) was founded in 1987 by the Istanbul Metropolitan Municipality. Originally established with a fleet of 10 seabuses built by the Kvaerner Fjellstrand shipyard of Norway, the İDO today has a fleet of 25 seabuses (with capacities ranging from 350 to 450 passengers) designed by Kvaerner Fjellstrand, Austal and the Damen Group; 10 high-speed car ferries (1200 passengers and 225 vehicles) designed by Austal and the Damen Group; 18 car ferries; 32 commuter ferries; and 1 large passenger ship. At present, the İDO is the world's largest commuter ferry operator with its 87-passenger ships and 86 piers. The company owns a total of 103 ships including its service vessels.

In 2011, the company was privatized for 30 years by the Istanbul Metropolitan Municipality.

== Fare system ==
The İDO uses several systems to manage trip fare. Since the conventional boats are scheduled on intracity lines and are roughly connected with other rapid transport systems such as the Istanbul Metro and İETT Buses, passengers simply pass through pay gates. There is no pre-reservation or assigned seating, and admission is fairly cheap. The pay system is integrated with Istanbulkart, which is also valid for all other means of public transport in Istanbul that are operated by the Metropolitan Municipality.

Seabuses are more expensive, and they are not as frequently used as the conventional commuter ferries. Passengers pay the fare at the pay gates and Istanbulkart cards are valid. The procedure is the same for the intercity seabus lines. There are no assigned seats for the passengers.

Fast car ferries and conventional vehicle carriers also carry passengers with no assigned seat numbers; however, in the high-speed car ferries, there are separate sections for the Economy Class (downstairs) and First Class (upstairs) tickets. Conventional carriers do not require pre-reservation. Passengers are suggested to reserve their seat and car slot beforehand, although there is no assigned seating in the double-ended fast ferries.

In an effort to improve customer satisfaction and the overall management of the fare system, İDO plans to switch to a dynamic pricing system similar to those of airline companies. Dynamic pricing implies that ticket prices will vary as the trip time approaches.

İDO tickets can be bought from online ticket/travel agencies such as Bilet.com. In this case, customers could be charged a small service fee in accordance with the conditions of ticket sale accord. Dynamic pricing system of İDO is also available to a small number of select online ticket agencies.

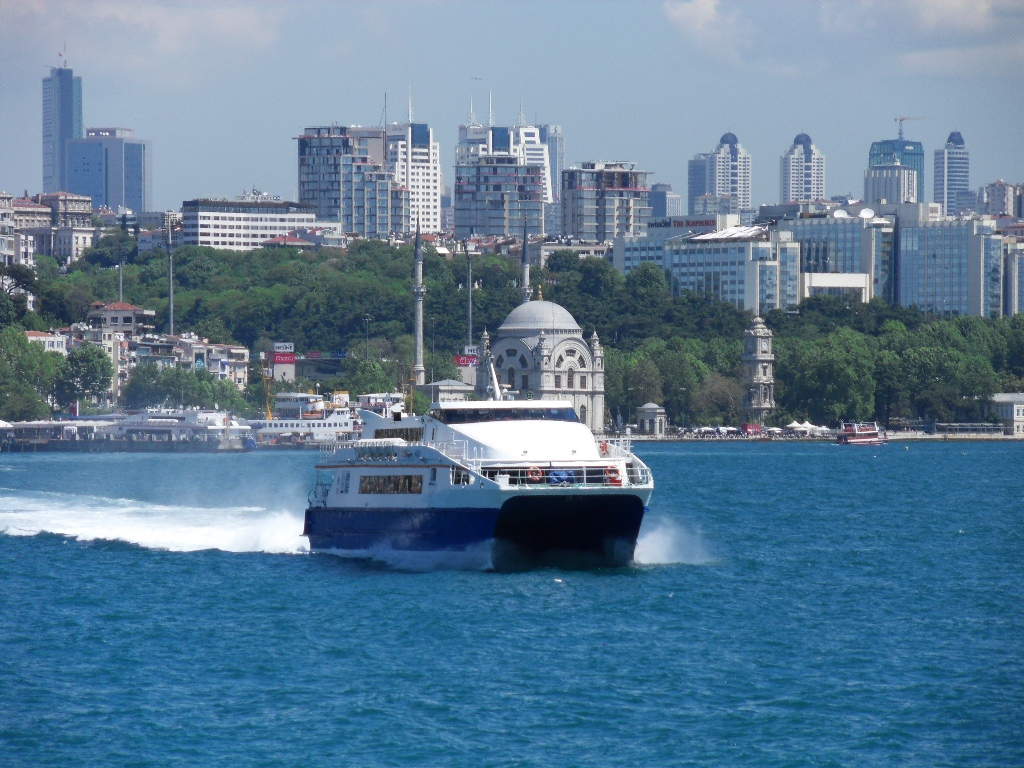
A Seabus on the Bosphorus

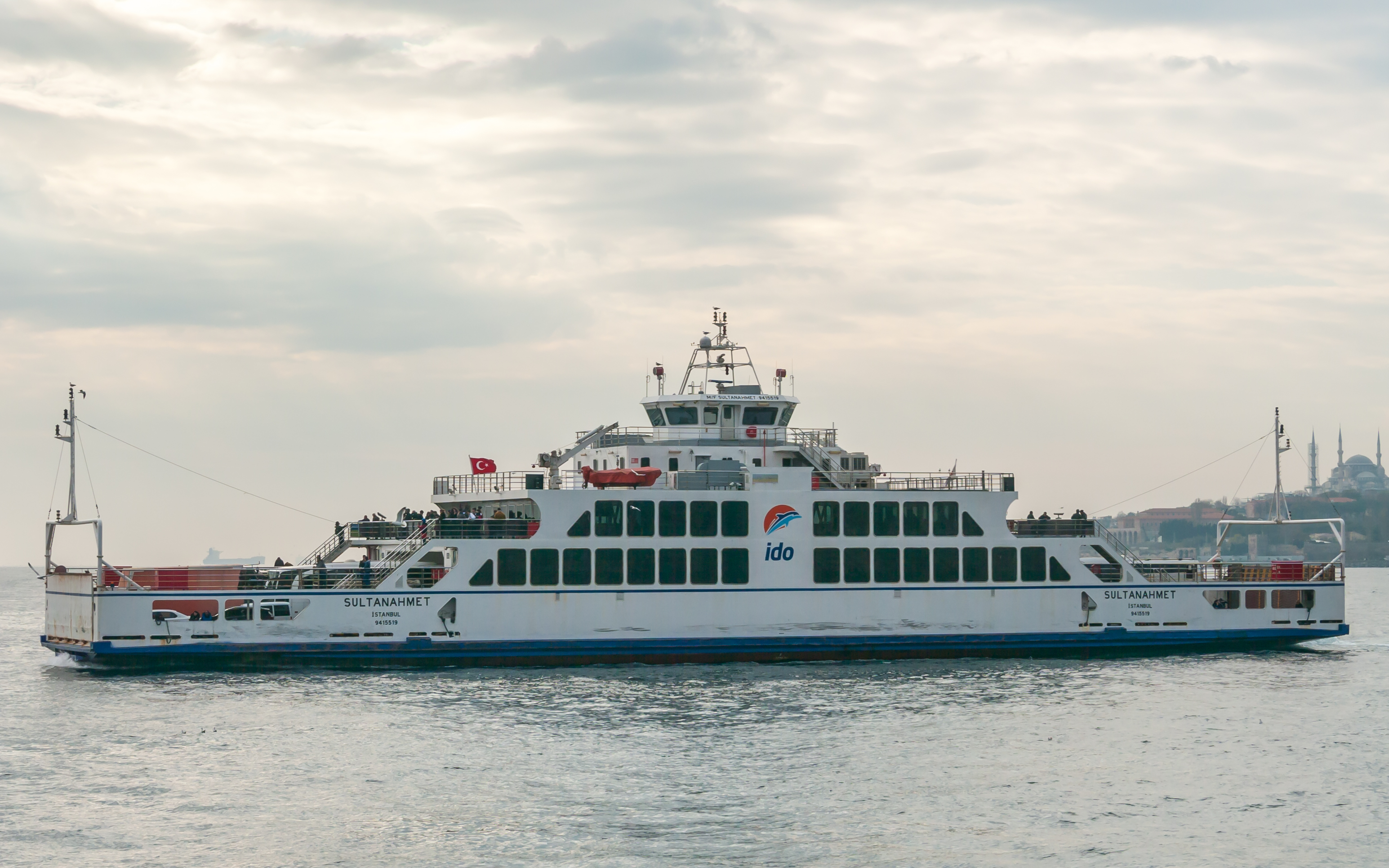
IDO car ferry Sultanahmet on the Bosphorus with its namesake in the background

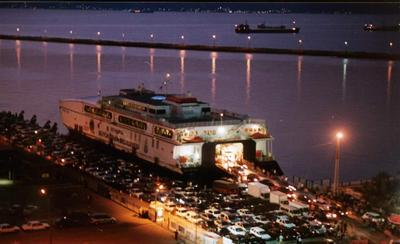
İDO car ferry at Bandırma

== Fleet ==
=== Fast Ferry ===
Fast Ferry Fleet (Updated 29.09.2026)
Type	Class	Firm	Number in fleet	Passenger Capacity	Vehicle Capacity	Year built	Maximum Speed (in miles)	Description
Double Ended Fast Ferry	Bureau Veritas	DAMEN	2	600	112	2008	22	Used in Yenikapı-Yalova line; names Kanuni Sultan Süleyman/Yavuz Sultan Selim
Katamaran Fast Ferry	Germanischer Lloyd	AUSTAL	1	800	200	1998	37	Used in Yenikapı-Bursa, Yenikapı-Yalova, Yenikapı-Bandırma line; names are Adnan Menderes
Double-Ended Fast Ferry	DNV	Kvaerner Fjellstrand	2	588	112	2007	22	Used in Pendik-Yalova line; names are Recep Tayyip Erdoğan/Fatih Sultan Mehmet-1

- İDO has total of 5 fast ferries.
- The average age of the fast ferry fleet is 21.3 years.

=== Seabuses ===
Seabus Fleet (Updated 28.01.2009)
Type	Firm	Number in fleet	Passenger Capacity	Year built	Maximum Speed (in miles)	Description
Katamaran	DAMEN	5	449	2007	30.9	Names Burak Reis-3/Salih Reis-4/Kemal Reis-5/Mehmet Reis-11/Murat Reis-7
Katamaran	Kvaerner Fjellstrand	10	449	1987/1988	25	Names are Umur Bey/Sarıca Bey/Uluç Ali Reis/Nusret Bey/Hezarfen Çelebi/Çaka Bey I/Yeditepe I/Ulubatlı Hasan/Karamürsel Bey/Çavlı Bey
Katamaran	Kvaerner Fjellstrand	8	350,358,400	1997,1998,2000	32	Names are Kaptan Paşa/Seydi Ali Reis I/Oruç Reis V/Piri Reis II/Temel Reis II/Hızır Reis III/Sokullu Mehmet Paşa/Barbaros Hayrettin Paşa
Katamaran	AUSTAL	2	450	1996	33.5	Names are Piyale Paşa/Sinan Paşa

- İDO has total of 25 seabuses.
- The average age of the seabus fleet is 12.4 years.

=== Car Ferries ===
Car Ferry (Conventional Vehicle Boat) Fleet (Updated 28.01.2009)
Number in fleet	Vehicle Capacity	Description
4	80	Between Harem-Sirkeci. Built in 2007 by Çeksan. Names Sahilbent, Suhulet, Sadabad, Sultan Ahmet
8	112	Between Eskihisar-Topçular.
6	66	Between Harem-Sirkeci and Eskihisar-Topçular

=== Overall ===
İDO Fleet (Updated 28.01.2009)
Type	Total	Passenger Capacity
Seabus	25	490 to 1200
Fast Ferry	10	350 to 450
Conventional Passenger Boat	38	750 to 2100
Conventional Vehicle Boat	17	600 Passenger + 66 to 112 Vehicle
Motorboat	7
Sea Taxies	6
Total	103

== Routes ==
Fast Ferry Lines	Trip Time	Notes
Yenikapı-Bursa	80 minutes	Trip by fast ferries. Cars with LPG and PNG are not allowed on katamaran type.
Yenikapı-Bandırma	120 minutes	Trip by fast ferries, but sometimes by seabuses. Seabus interchange from Bostancı before half hour.
Yenikapı-Yalova	70 minutes	Trip by fast ferries or seabuses. Vehicles with LPG and PNG are allowed only in double-ended type. Seabuses are only for passengers.
Pendik-Yalova	45 minutes	Trip by double-ended fast ferries. Vehicles with LPG and PNG are allowed.

Inter-City Seabus Lines	Trip Time	Notes	Fares (TL)
Istanbul-Armutlu-Kumla-Gemlik	Yenikapı to Armutlu in 75 minutes; to Kumla 90 minutes; to Gemlik 105 minutes	The seabus first moves from Bostancı to Yenikapı and then goes to the otherside of The Marmara Sea.	Normal 18 Discount 14
Istanbul-Marmara Island-Avsa Island	5 hours to Marmara Island; 5.5 hours to Avşa	Only in the weekends. The boat takes off from Sarayburnu.	Normal 45 Discount 40
Istanbul-Çınarcık-Esenköy	65 minutes to Çınarcık; 75 minutes to Esenköy		Normal 14/Discount 12
Bostancı-Kartal-Yalova	40 minutes		Normal 7.5/discount 6
Kabataş-Kadıköy-Bursa	120 minutes		Normal 21/Discount 16

Inner-City Seabus Lines	Trip Time	Notes	Fares (TL)
Bostancı-Kadıköy-Yenikapı-Bakırköy	From Bostancı 20 minutes to Kadıköy;30 minutes to Yenikapı;55 minutes to Bakırköy		Token 6 Normal 4 Discount 2,65
Bostancı-Kabataş	25 minutes	Some trips overstop at Kadıköy. No trips on Sunday and Holidays.	Token 6 Normal 4 Discount 2,65
Bostancı-Kabataş-Kadıköy-Bakırköy-Avcılar-Büyükçekmece	See this	In winter, no trips to Büyükçekmece. Usually interchange in Bakırköy to go Bostancı. Only in weekdays.	Token 6 Normal 4 Discount 2,65
Pendik-Kartal-Maltepe-Bostancı-Kabataş-Bakırköy-Avcılar	From Pendik, 15 minutes to Kartal; 30 minutes to Maltepe; 50 minutes to Bostancı	Passengers must interchange in Bostancı pier to go to the European Side. Only in weekdays.	Token 6 Normal 4 Discount 2,65
Kabataş-Princes' Islands-Bostancı	From Kabataş, 20 min to Kınalı, 30 min to Burgaz, 45 min to Büyük, 55 min to Heybeli, 75 min to Bostancı	Only in weekends	From Bostancı From Kabataş Token 4 7 Normal 3,25 5,50 Discount2,75 4

Vehicle Boat Lines	Trip Time	Notes
Eskihisar-Topçular	35 min	Old types of conventional boats. 20 minutes between two trips.
Harem-Sirkeci	12 min/20 min	New types are faster. 20 min between 2 trips in weekdays and Saturdays.
Erdek-Marmara Island-Avşa

== Images of the Seabus models ==
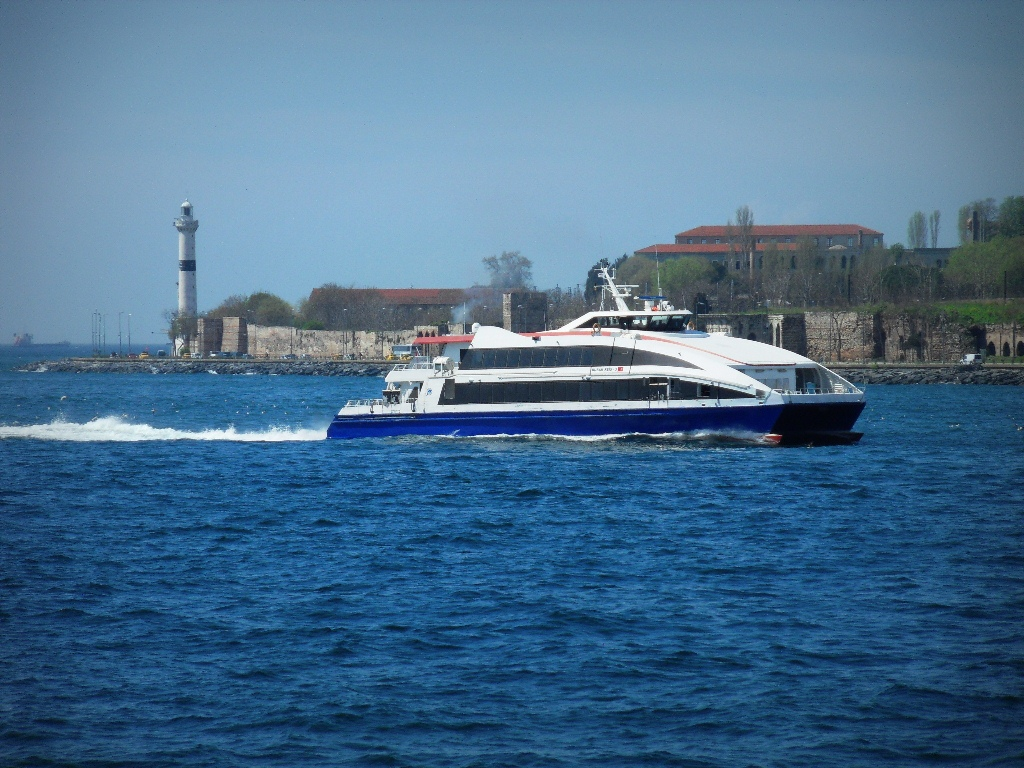
Damen made İDO ferry

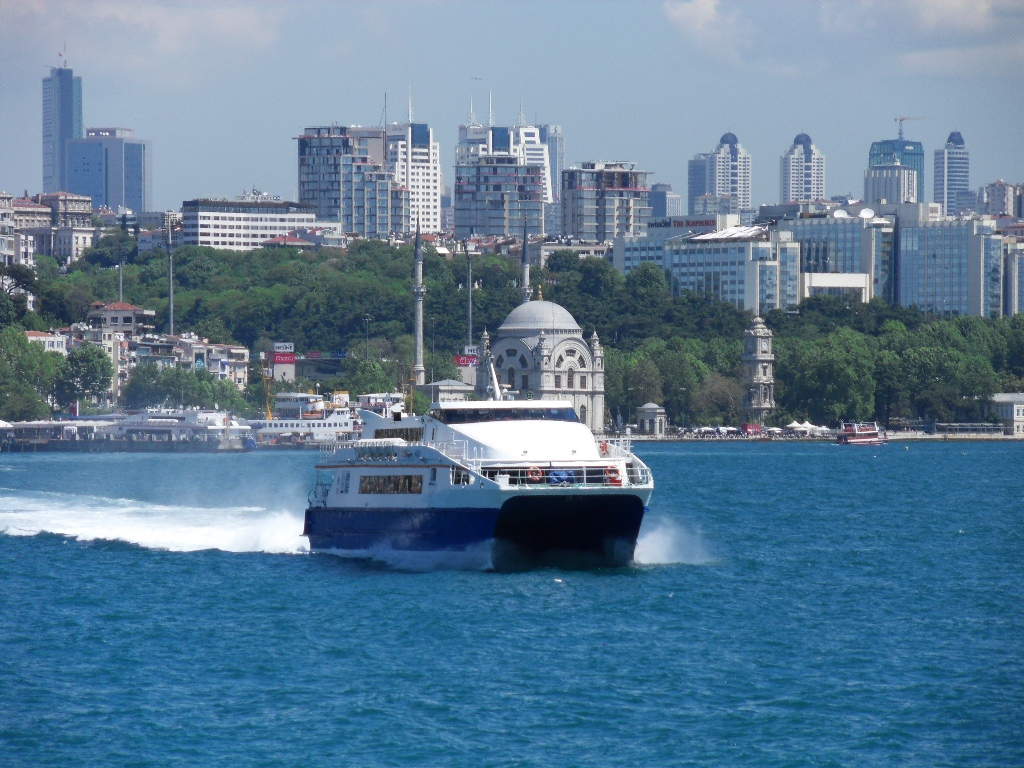
Austal made İDO ferry
