= Istanbul =

Largest city in Turkey

Istanbul İstanbul (Turkish)
- Metropolitan municipality and province
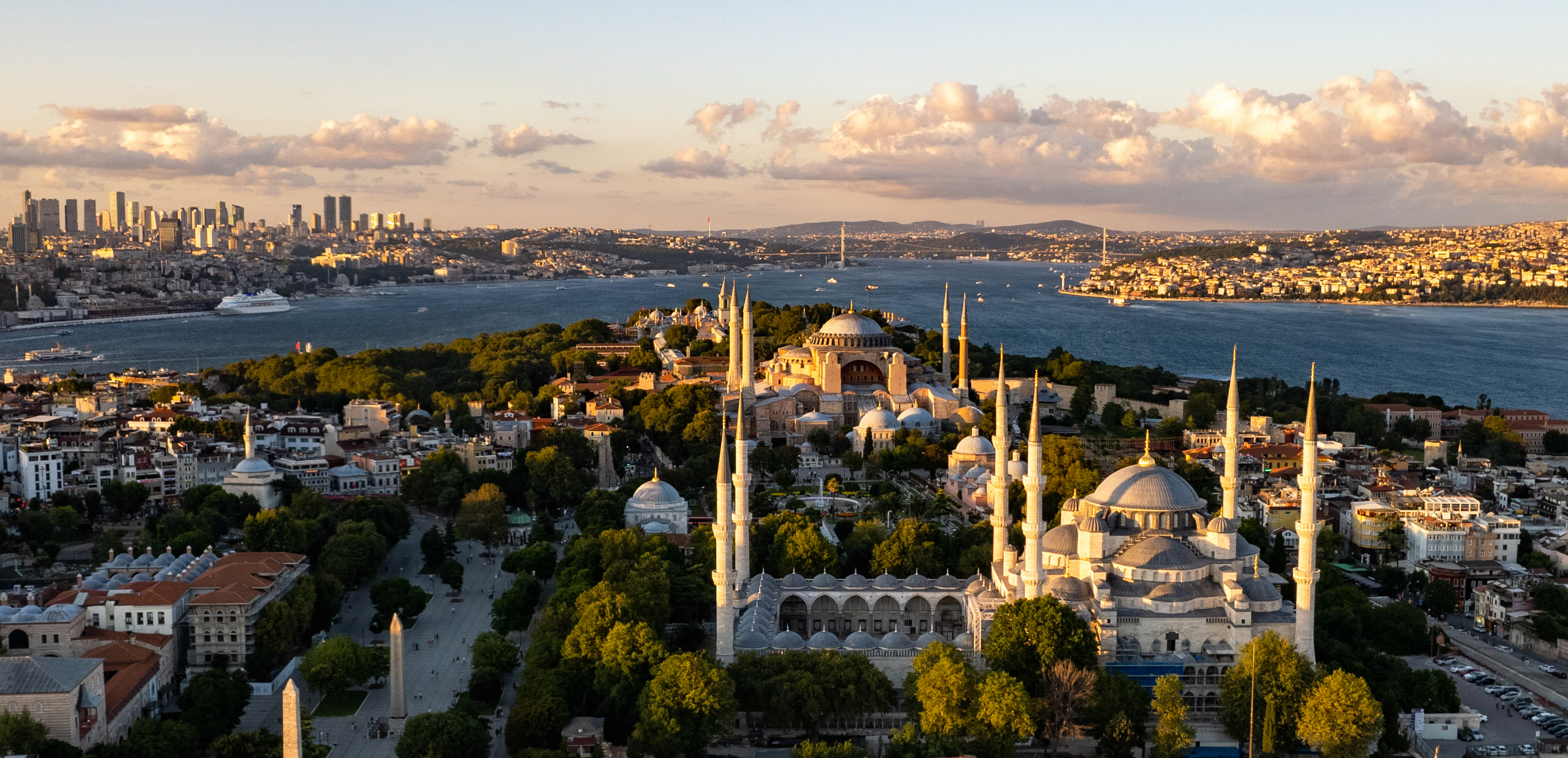
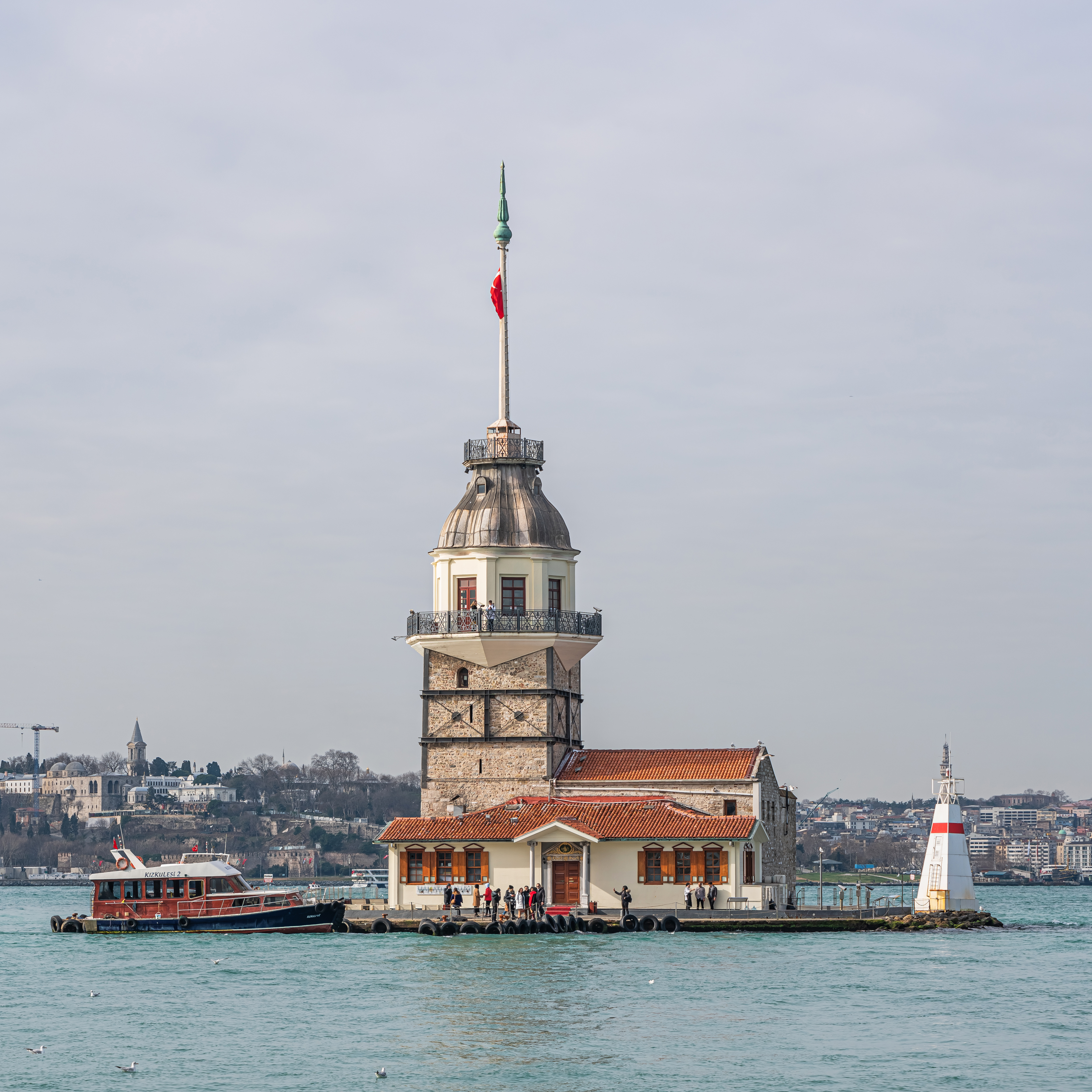
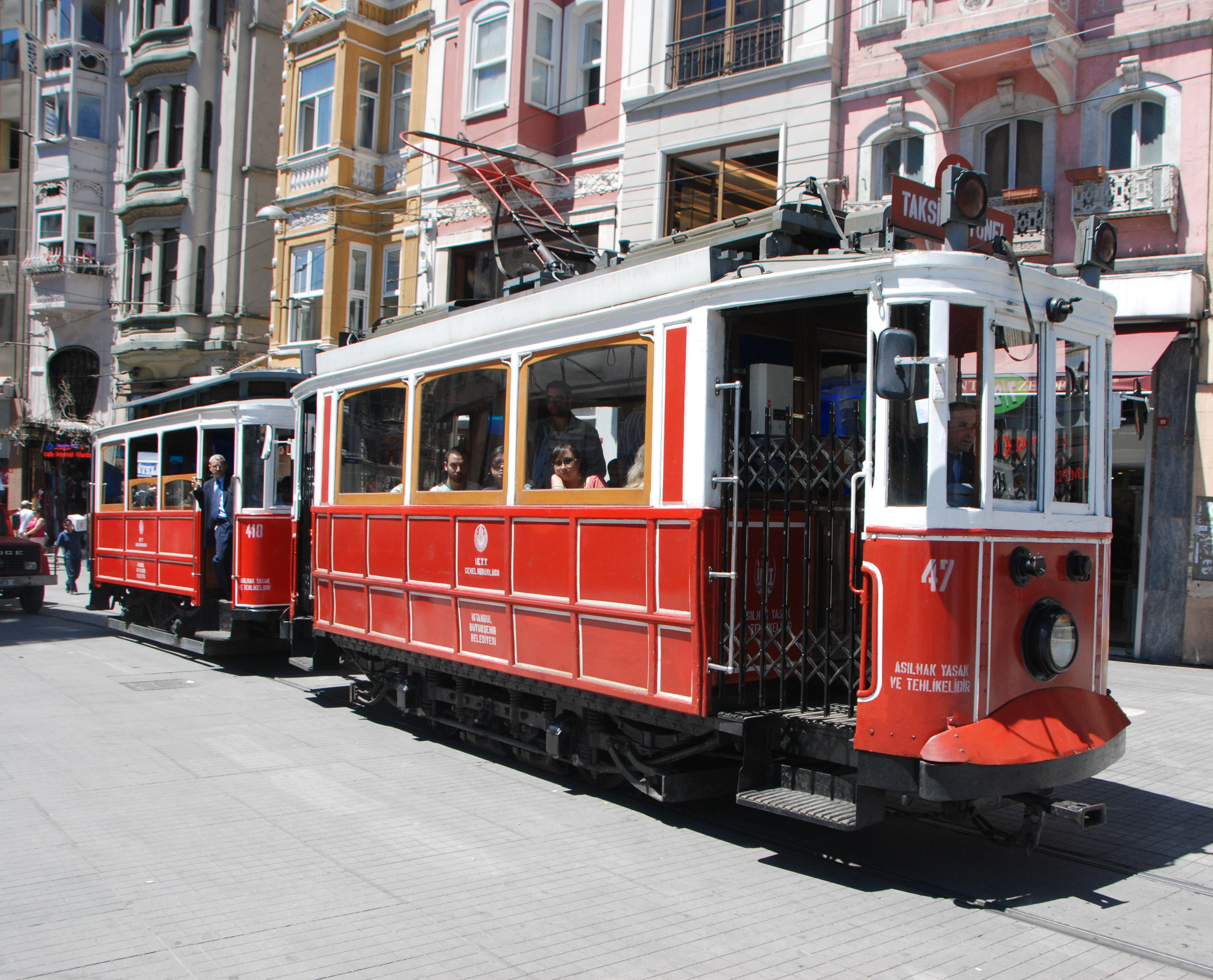
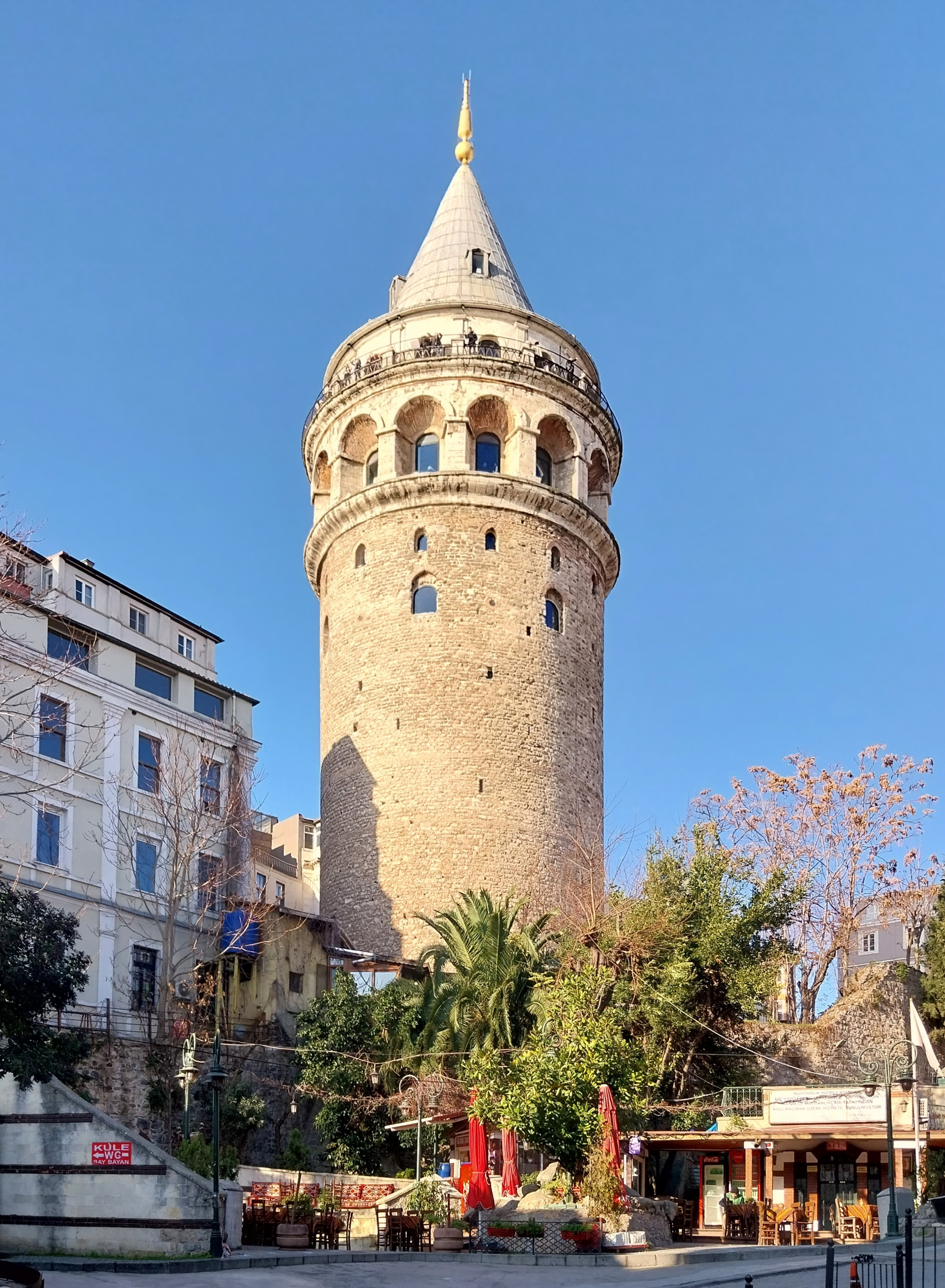
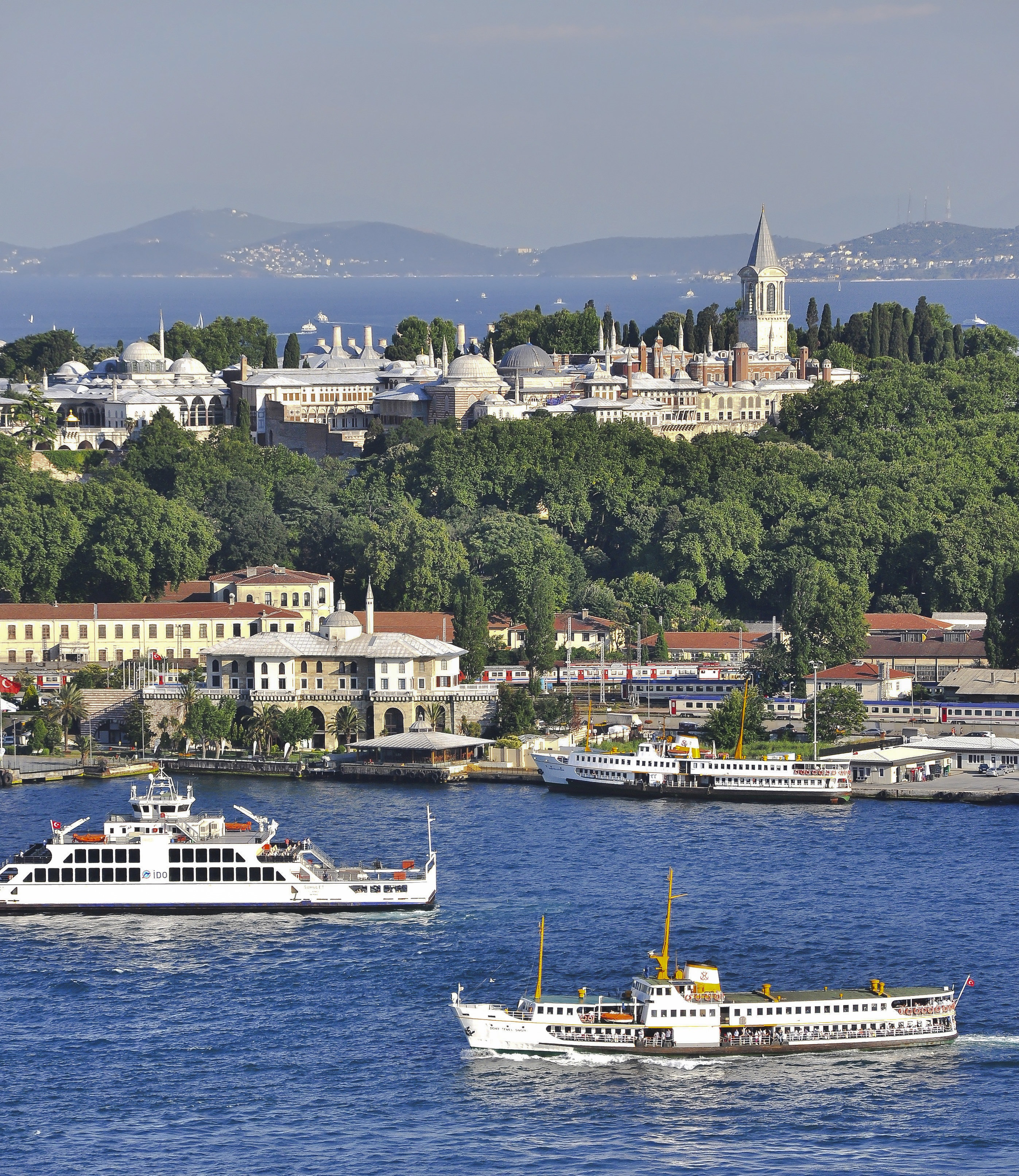
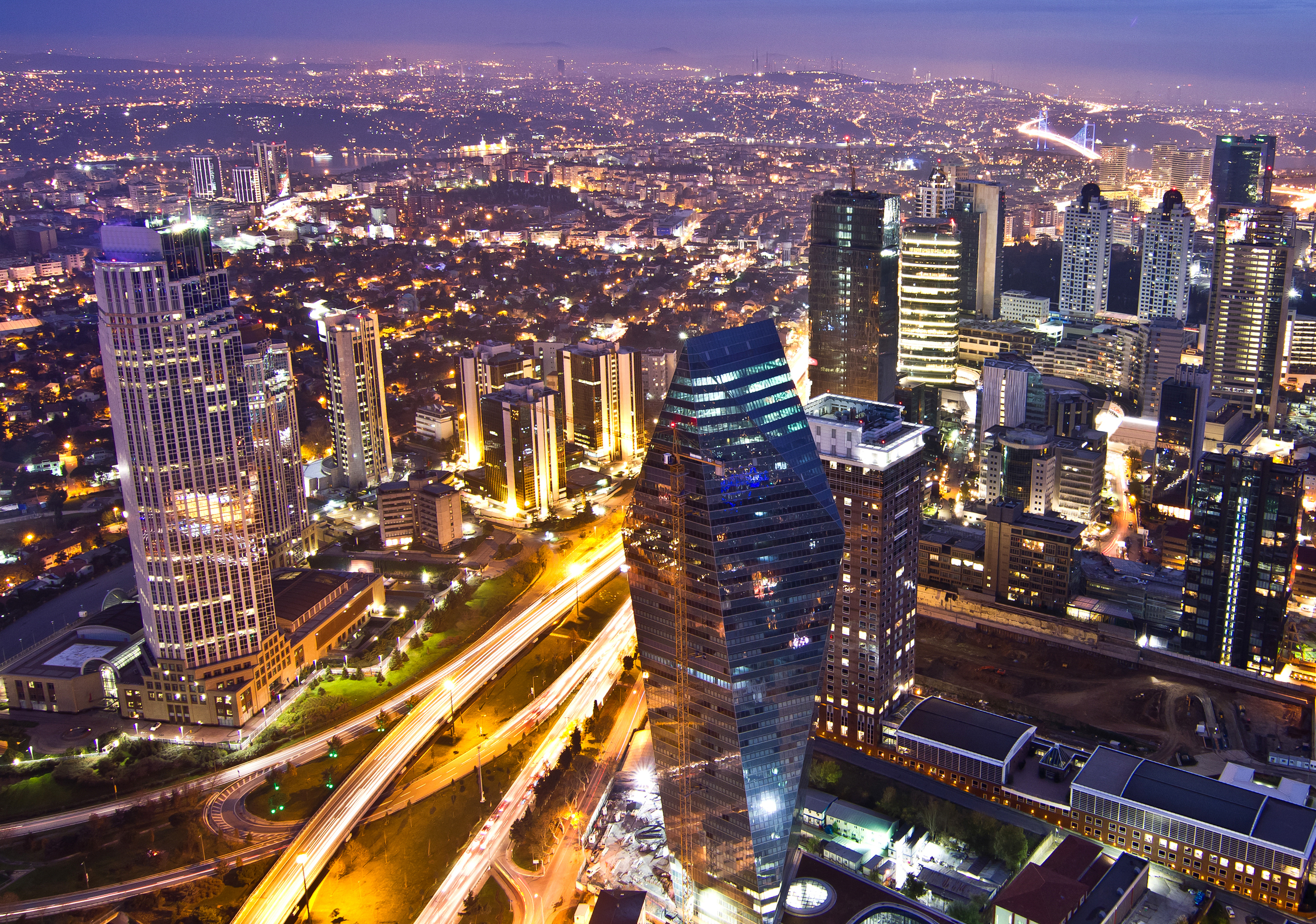
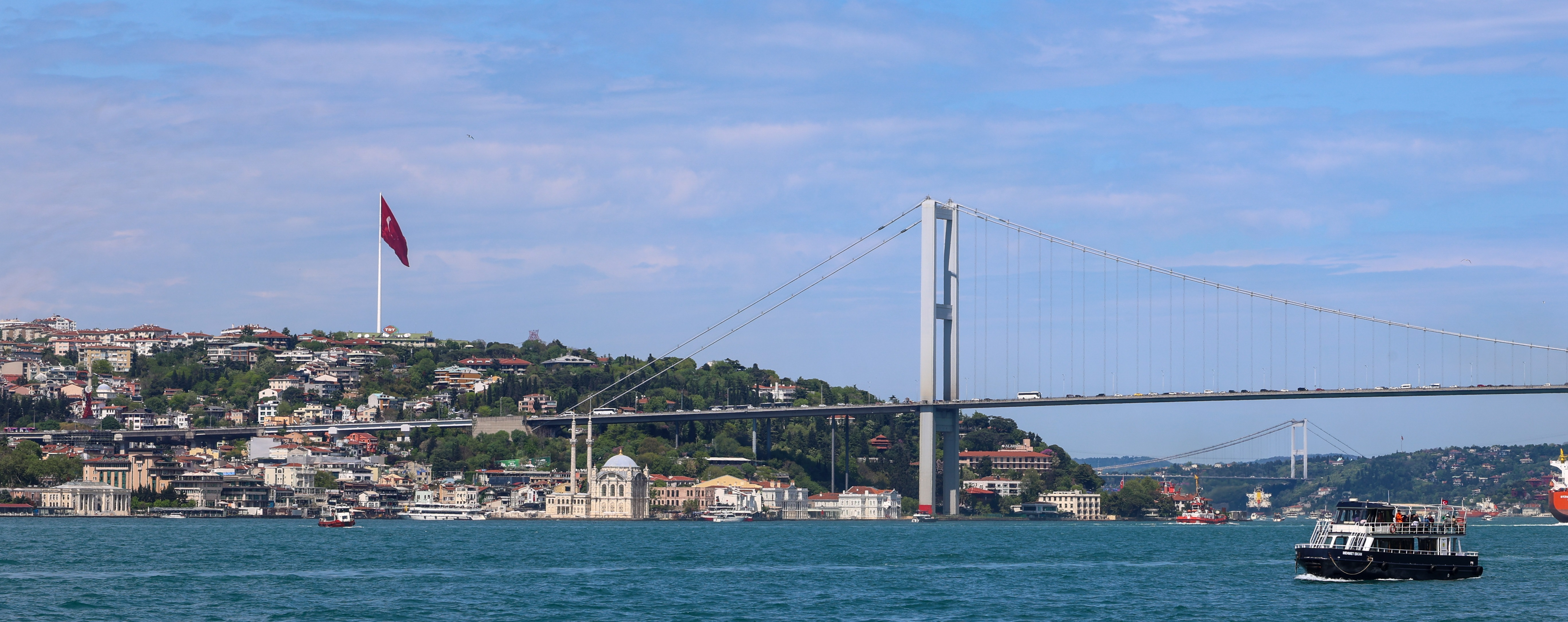
- Historical peninsula, including the Blue Mosque and Hagia Sophia Maiden's Tower İstiklal Avenue and its tram Galata Tower Topkapı Palace Levent, a business district Bosporus, 15 July Martyrs Bridge and Ortaköy Mosque

- Flag Emblem of Istanbul

- Interactive map of Istanbul
- Location within Turkey Location within Europe Location within Asia
- Coordinates: 41°00′49″N 28°57′18″E
- Country: Turkey
- Region: Marmara
- Province: Istanbul
- Established: 11 May 330
- Provincial seat: Cağaloğlu, Fatih
- Districts: 39

Government
  - Type: Mayor–council government
  - Body: Municipal Council of Istanbul
  - Mayor: Nuri Aslan (acting) (CHP)
  - Governor: Davut Gül

Area (Note: İstanbul Province = 5,460.85 km^{2}: Land area = 5,343.22 km^{2}; Lake/Dam = 117.63 km^{2}; Europe (25 districts) = 3,474.35 km^{2}; Asia (14 districts) = 1,868.87 km^{2}; Urban (36 districts) = 2,576.85 km^{2} [Metro (39 districts) – (Çatalca+Silivri+Şile)]; *According to the size of the population and the status of megacity, the limits of the Istanbul city correspond to the limits of the province, and the province is treated like as the metropolitan-city of Istanbul.)
  - Urban: 2,576.85 km^{2} (994.93 sq mi)
  - Metro: 5,343.22 km^{2} (2,063.03 sq mi)
- Highest elevation: 537 m (1,762 ft)

Population (31 December 2025)
  - Metropolitan municipality and province: 15,754,053
  - Rank: 1st in Turkey and Europe; 8th in Asia
  - Urban: 15,382,791
  - Urban density: 5,970/km^{2} (15,500/sq mi)
  - Metro density: 2,948/km^{2} (7,640/sq mi)
- Demonym: Istanbulite (Turkish: İstanbullu)

GDP (nominal, 2024)
  - Metropolitan municipality and province: ₺13.011 trillion; (US$396.3 billion)
  - Per capita: ₺802,669; (US$24,452)
- Time zone: UTC+3 (TRT)
- Postal code: 34000 to 34990
- Area codes: +90 212 (European side); +90 216 (Asian side)
- ISO 3166 code: TR-34
- Vehicle registration: 34
- HDI (2022): 0.888 (very high) · 1st
- GeoTLD: .ist, .istanbul
- Website: ibb.istanbul (Municipality); istanbul.gov.tr (Governorship)

UNESCO World Heritage Site
- Official name: Historic Areas of Istanbul
- Criteria: Cultural: (i)(ii)(iii)(iv)
- Reference: 356
- Inscription: 1985 (9th Session)
- Extensions: 2017
- Area: 765.5 ha (1,892 acres)

Istanbul, (Note: English: /ˌɪstænˈbʊl/ IST-an-BUUL, US also /ˈɪstænbʊl/ IST-an-buul or /ˈɪstɑːnbʊl/ IST-ahn-buul; Turkish: İstanbul, pronounced [isˈtanbuɫ], colloquially [ɯsˈtambuɫ].) historically known as Constantinople, (Note: Koine Greek: Κωνσταντινούπολις, romanized: Kōnstantīnoúpolis; Ottoman Turkish: قسطنطینیه, romanized: Ḳosṭanṭīnīye; Latin: Constantinopolis.) is the largest city in Turkey, a megacity, constituting the country's economic, cultural, and historical center. With a population of over 15 million, it is home to 18% of the population of Turkey. Istanbul is among the largest cities in Europe (Note: Istanbul, while the largest in Europe if the entire city is counted as European, straddles both Europe and Asia, with its commercial and historical center and two-thirds of the population in Europe, the rest in Asia. Since Istanbul is a transcontinental city, Moscow is the largest city entirely within Europe.) and in the world by population. It is a city on two continents; about two-thirds of its population live in Europe and the rest in Asia. Istanbul straddles the Bosphorus – one of the world's busiest waterways – in northwestern Turkey, between the Sea of Marmara and the Black Sea. Its area of 5,461 square kilometers (2,109 mi^{2}) is coterminous with Istanbul Province.

The city developed to become one of the most significant cities in history. Byzantium was founded on the (present-day) Sarayburnu promontory by Greek colonists in the seventh century BC. For nearly 16 centuries following its reestablishment as Constantinople in AD 330, it served as the capital of four empires: the Roman Empire (330–395), the Eastern Roman (Byzantine) Empire (395–1204 and 1261–1453), the Latin Empire (1204–1261), and the Ottoman Empire (1453–1922). It was instrumental in the advancement of Christianity during Roman and Byzantine times, before the Ottomans conquered the city in 1453 and transformed it into an Islamic stronghold and the seat of their caliphate. Although the Republic of Turkey established its capital in Ankara, palaces and imperial mosques still line Istanbul's hills as visible reminders of the city's previous central role. The historic center of Istanbul is a UNESCO World Heritage Site.

Istanbul's strategic position along the historic Silk Road, its rail networks to Europe and West Asia, and the only sea route between the Black Sea and the Mediterranean have helped foster an eclectic populace, although less so since the establishment of the Republic in 1923. Overlooked for the new capital during the interwar period, the city has since regained much of its prominence. The population of the city has increased tenfold since the 1950s, as migrants from across Anatolia have flocked to the metropolis and city limits have expanded to accommodate them. The majority of Istanbul's Turkish citizens are of ethnic Turkish origin, whereas ethnic Kurds represent the largest ethnic minority in the city.

Considered an alpha global city, Istanbul accounts for about 30% of Turkey's economy. The Istanbul–İzmit area is one of the main industrial regions in Turkey. In 2025, Euromonitor International ranked Istanbul as the fifth most visited city in the world. Istanbul is home to two international airports, multiple ports, and numerous universities. It is among the top 100 science and technology clusters in the world. The city hosts a large part of Turkish football and sports in general, with clubs such as Galatasaray, Fenerbahçe, and Beşiktaş. Istanbul is vulnerable to earthquakes as it is in close proximity to the North Anatolian Fault.

== Names ==
The first known name of the city is Byzantium (Ancient Greek: Βυζάντιον, Byzántion), the name given to it at its foundation by Megarian colonists around 657 BC. Megarian colonists claimed a direct line back to the founders of the city, Byzas, the son of the god Poseidon and the nymph Ceroëssa. Modern excavations have raised the possibility that the name Byzantium might reflect the sites of native Thracian settlements that preceded the fully-fledged town. Constantinople (Greek: Κωνσταντινούπολις, romanized: Kōnstantinoupolis; Latin: Constantinopolis) comes from the Latin name Constantinus, after Constantine the Great, the Roman emperor who refounded the city in 324 AD. Constantine had initially called the city New Rome (Ancient Greek: Νέα Ῥώμη; Nea Rhomē; Latin: Nova Roma). Constantinople remained the most common name for the city in the West until the 1930s, when Turkish authorities began to press for the use of Istanbul in foreign languages. Ḳosṭanṭīnīye (Ottoman Turkish: قسطنطینیه) and İstanbul (استانبول) were the names used alternatively by the Ottomans during their rule.

The name İstanbul (pronounced [isˈtanbuɫ], colloquially [ɯsˈtambuɫ]) is commonly held to derive from the Medieval Greek phrase eis tḕn Pólin (εἰς τὴν Πόλιν, pronounced [is tim ˈbolin]), literally "to the city", and is how Constantinople was referred to by the local Greeks. This reflected its status as the only major city in the vicinity. The importance of Constantinople in the Ottoman world was also reflected by its nickname Dersaadet (درساعدت) meaning the 'Gate to Prosperity' in Ottoman Turkish. An alternative view is that the name evolved directly from "Constantinople", with the first and third syllables dropped. Some Ottoman sources of the 17th century, such as Evliya Çelebi, describe it as the common Turkish name of the time; between the late 17th and late 18th centuries, it was also in official use. The first use of the word Islambol (Ottoman Turkish: اسلامبول) on coinage was in 1730 during the reign of Sultan Mahmud I. In modern Turkish, the name is written as İstanbul, with a dotted İ, as the Turkish alphabet distinguishes between a dotted and dotless I. In English, the stress is on the first or last syllable, but in Turkish it is on the second syllable. A person from the city is an İstanbullu (plural İstanbullular); Istanbulite is used in English.

== History ==
Neolithic artifacts, uncovered by archeologists at the beginning of the 21st century, indicate that Istanbul's historic peninsula was settled as far back as the 6th millennium BC. That early settlement, important in the spread of the Neolithic Revolution from the Near East to Europe, lasted for almost a millennium before being inundated by rising water levels. The first human settlement on the Asian side, the Fikirtepe mound, is from the Copper Age period, with artifacts dating from 5500 to 3500 BC, On the European side, near the point of the peninsula (Sarayburnu), there was a Thracian settlement during the early 1st millennium BC. Modern authors have linked it to the Thracian toponym Lygos, mentioned by Pliny the Elder as an earlier name for the site of Byzantium.

The history of the city proper begins around 660 BC, (Note: The foundation of Byzantion (Byzantium) is sometimes, especially in encyclopedic or other tertiary sources, placed firmly in 667 BC. Historians have disputed the precise year the city was founded. Commonly cited is the work of 5th-century-BC historian Herodotus, which says the city was founded seventeen years after Chalcedon, which came into existence around 685 BC. Eusebius concurs with 685 BC as the year Chalcedon was founded, but places Byzantion's establishment in 659 BC. Among more modern historians, Carl Roebuck proposed the 640s BC and others have suggested even later. The foundation date of Chalcedon is itself subject to some debate; while many sources place it in 685 BC, others put it in 675 BC or even 639 BC (with Byzantion's establishment placed in 619 BC). Some sources refer to Byzantium's foundation as the 7th century BC.) when Greek settlers from Megara established Byzantium on the European side of the Bosporus. The settlers built an acropolis adjacent to the Golden Horn on the site of the early Thracian settlements, fueling the nascent city's economy. The city experienced a brief period of Persian rule at the turn of the 5th century BC, but the Greeks recaptured it during the Greco-Persian Wars. Byzantium then continued as part of the Athenian League and its successor, the Second Athenian League, before gaining independence in 355 BC. Long allied with the Romans, Byzantium officially became a part of the Roman Empire in 73 AD. Byzantium's decision to side with the Roman usurper Pescennius Niger against Emperor Septimius Severus cost it dearly; by the time it surrendered at the end of 195 AD, two years of siege had left the city devastated. Five years later, Severus began to rebuild Byzantium, and the city regained – and, by some accounts, surpassed – its previous prosperity.

=== Byzantine era ===
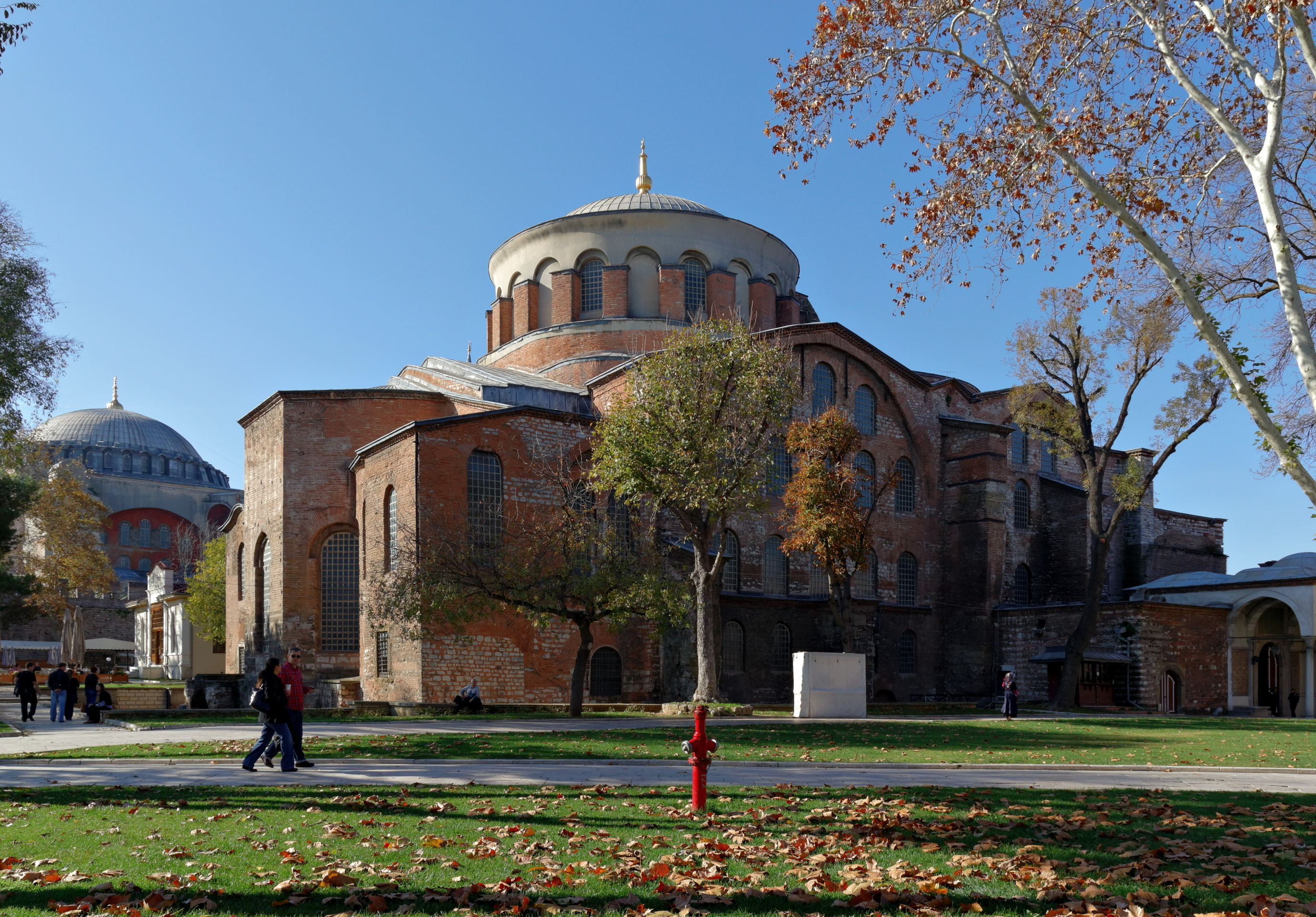
Originally built by Constantine the Great in the 4th century and later rebuilt by Justinian I after the Nika riots in 532, the Hagia Irene is an Eastern Orthodox Church located in the outer courtyard of Topkapı Palace in Istanbul. It is one of the few Byzantine era churches that were never converted into mosques; during the Ottoman period it served as Topkapı's principal armoury

Constantine the Great effectively became the emperor of the whole of the Roman Empire in September 324. Two months later, he laid out the plans for a new, Christian city to replace Byzantium. As the eastern capital of the empire, the city was named Nova Roma; most called it Constantinople, a name that persisted into the 20th century. On 11 May 330, Constantinople was proclaimed the capital of the Roman Empire, which was later permanently divided between the two sons of Theodosius I upon his death on 17 January 395, when the city became the capital of the eastern empire. During the following millennium of Roman history the state was commonly referred to as the "Byzantine Empire".

The establishment of Constantinople was one of Constantine's most lasting accomplishments, shifting Roman power eastward as the city became a center of Greek culture and Christianity. Numerous churches were built across the city, including Hagia Sophia which was built during the reign of Justinian I and remained the world's largest cathedral for a thousand years. Constantine also undertook a major renovation and expansion of the Hippodrome of Constantinople; accommodating tens of thousands of spectators, the hippodrome became central to civic life and, in the 5th and 6th centuries, the center of episodes of unrest, including the Nika riots. Constantinople's location also ensured its existence would stand the test of time; for many centuries, its walls and seafront protected Europe against invaders from the east and the advance of Islam. During most of the Middle Ages, the latter part of the Byzantine era, Constantinople was the largest and wealthiest city on the European continent and at times the largest in the world. Constantinople is generally considered to be the center and the "cradle of Orthodox Christian civilization".

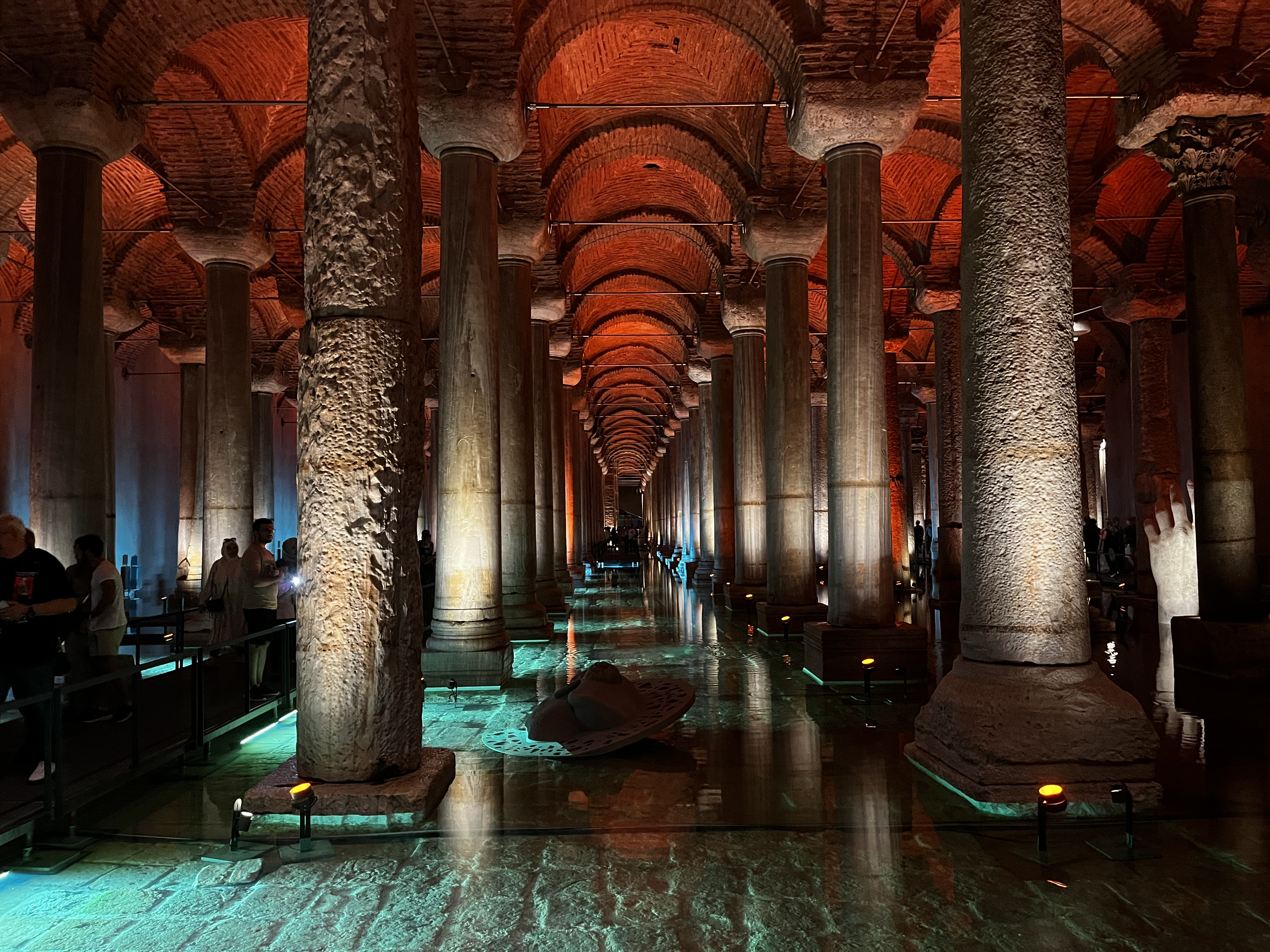
The 6th century Basilica Cistern was built by Justinian the Great

Constantinople began to decline continuously after the end of the reign of Basil II in 1025. The Fourth Crusade was diverted from its purpose in 1204, and the city was sacked and pillaged by the crusaders. They established the Latin Empire in place of the Orthodox Byzantine Empire. Hagia Sophia was converted to a Catholic church in 1204. The Byzantine Empire was restored, albeit weakened, in 1261. Constantinople's churches, defenses, and basic services were in disrepair, and its population had dwindled to a hundred thousand from half a million during the 8th century. (Note: Historians disagree – sometimes substantially – on population figures of Istanbul (Constantinople), and other world cities, prior to the 20th century. A follow-up to Chandler & Fox 1974,Chandler 1987, pp. 463–505 examines different sources' estimates and chooses the most likely based on historical conditions; it is the source of most population figures between 100 and 1914. The ranges of values between 500 and 1000 are due to Morris 2010, which also does a comprehensive analysis of sources, including Chandler (1987); Morris notes that many of Chandler's estimates during that time seem too large for the city's size, and presents smaller estimates. Chandler disagrees with Turan 2010 on the population of the city in the mid-1920s (with the former suggesting 817,000 in 1925), but Turan, p. 224, is used as the source of population figures between 1924 and 2005. Turan's figures, as well as the 2010 figure, come from the Turkish Statistical Institute. The drastic increase in population between 1980 and 1985 is largely due to an enlargement of the city's limits (see the Administration section). Explanations for population changes in pre-Republic times can be inferred from the History section.) After the reconquest of 1261, however, some of the city's monuments were restored, and some, like the two Deesis mosaics in Hagia Sophia and Kariye, were created.

Various economic and military policies instituted by Andronikos II Palaiologos, such as the reduction of military forces, weakened the empire and left it vulnerable to attack. In the mid-14th-century, the Ottoman Turks began a strategy of gradually taking smaller towns and cities, cutting off Constantinople's supply routes and strangling it slowly. On 29 May 1453, after a 55-day siege during which the last Roman emperor, Constantine XI, was killed, Sultan Mehmed II "the Conqueror" captured Constantinople.

=== Ottoman Empire ===
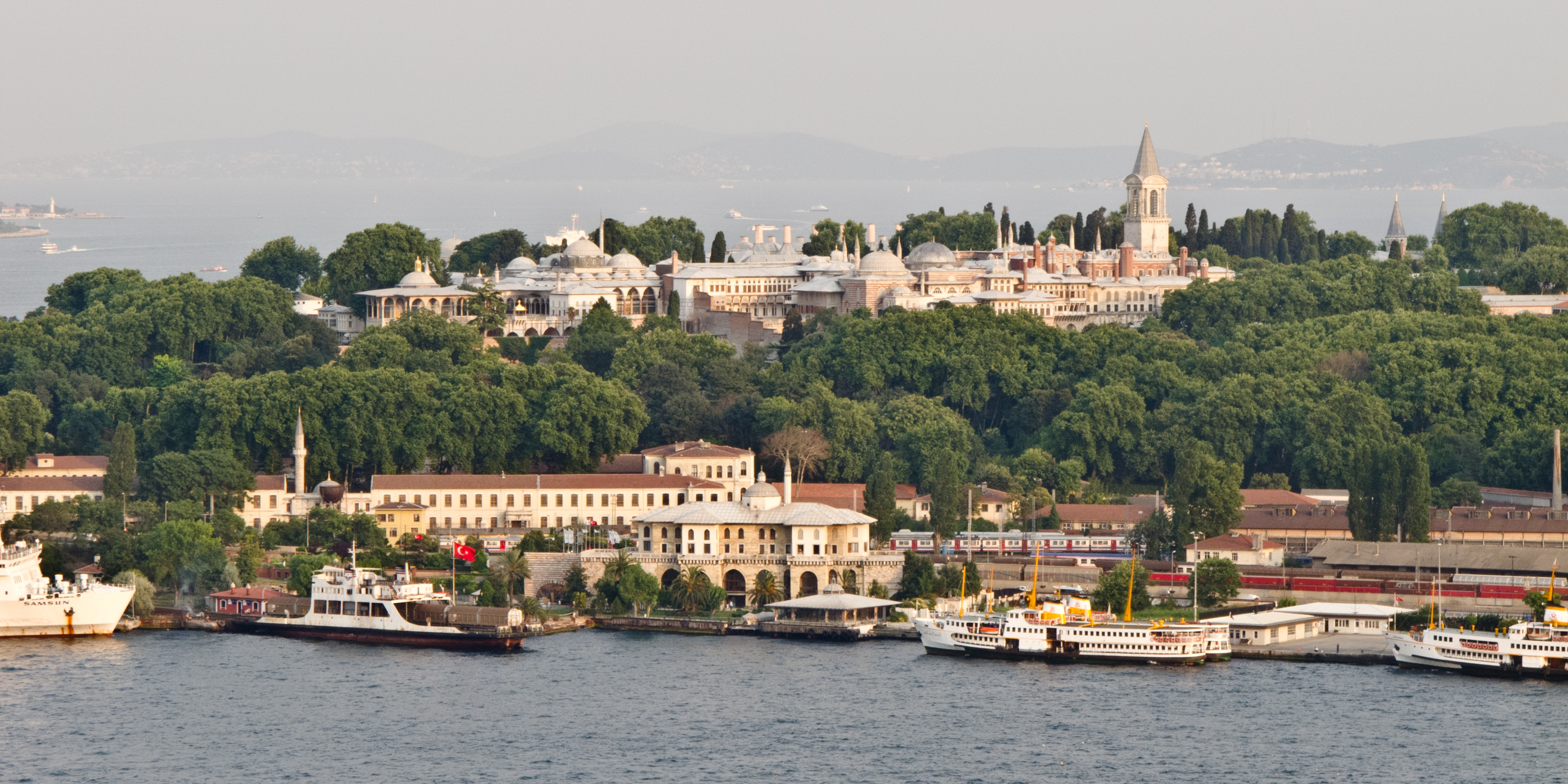
Topkapı Palace was built by Sultan Mehmed II between 1459 and 1465

Sultan Mehmed declared Constantinople the new capital of the Ottoman Empire. Hours after the fall of the city, the sultan rode to the Hagia Sophia and summoned an imam to proclaim the shahada, converting the grand cathedral into an imperial mosque due to the city's refusal to surrender peacefully. Mehmed declared himself as the new Kayser-i Rûm, the Ottoman Turkish equivalent of the Caesar of Rome, and the Ottoman state was reorganized into an empire.

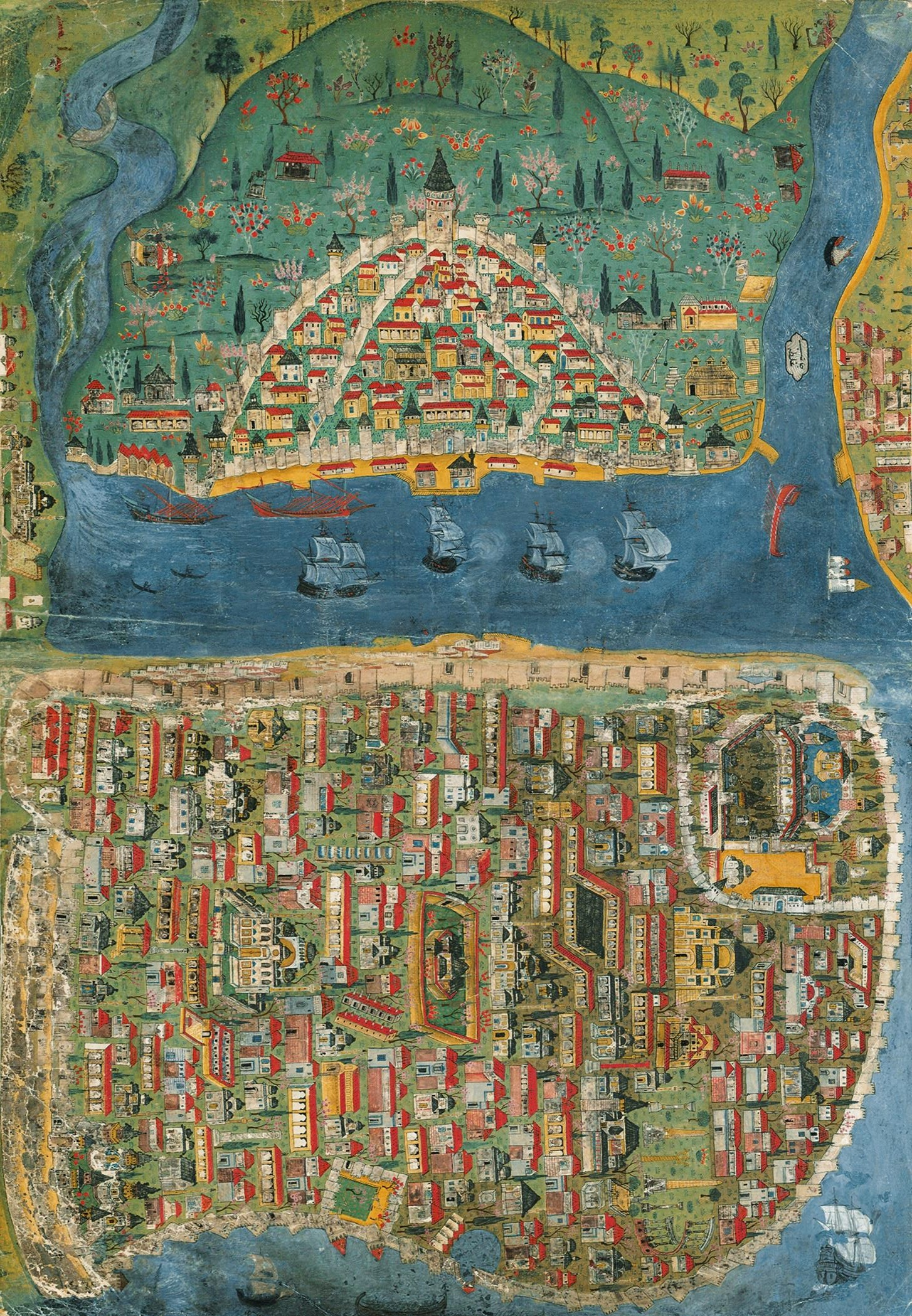
16th century map of Istanbul by the Ottoman polymath Matrakçı Nasuh

Following the capture of Constantinople, Mehmed II immediately set out to revitalize the city. Cognizant that revitalization would fail without the repopulation of the city, Mehmed II welcomed everyone–foreigners, criminals, and runaways– showing extraordinary openness and willingness to incorporate outsiders that came to define Ottoman political culture. He also invited people from all over Europe to his capital, creating a cosmopolitan society that persisted through much of the Ottoman period. Revitalizing Istanbul also required a massive program of restorations, of everything from roads to aqueducts. Like many monarchs before and since, Mehmed II transformed Istanbul's urban landscape with the wholesale redevelopment of the city center. There was a huge new palace to rival, if not overshadow, the old one, a new covered market (still standing as the Grand Bazaar), porticoes, pavilions, walkways, as well as more than a dozen new mosques. Mehmed II turned the ramshackle old town into something that looked like an imperial capital.

Social hierarchy was ignored by the rampant plague, which killed the rich and the poor alike in the 16th century. Money could not protect the rich from all the discomforts and harsher sides of Istanbul. Although the Sultan lived at a safe remove from the masses, and the wealthy and poor tended to live side by side, for the most part Istanbul was not zoned as modern cities are. Opulent houses shared the same streets and districts with tiny hovels. Those rich enough to have secluded country properties had a chance of escaping the periodic epidemics of sickness that blighted Istanbul.

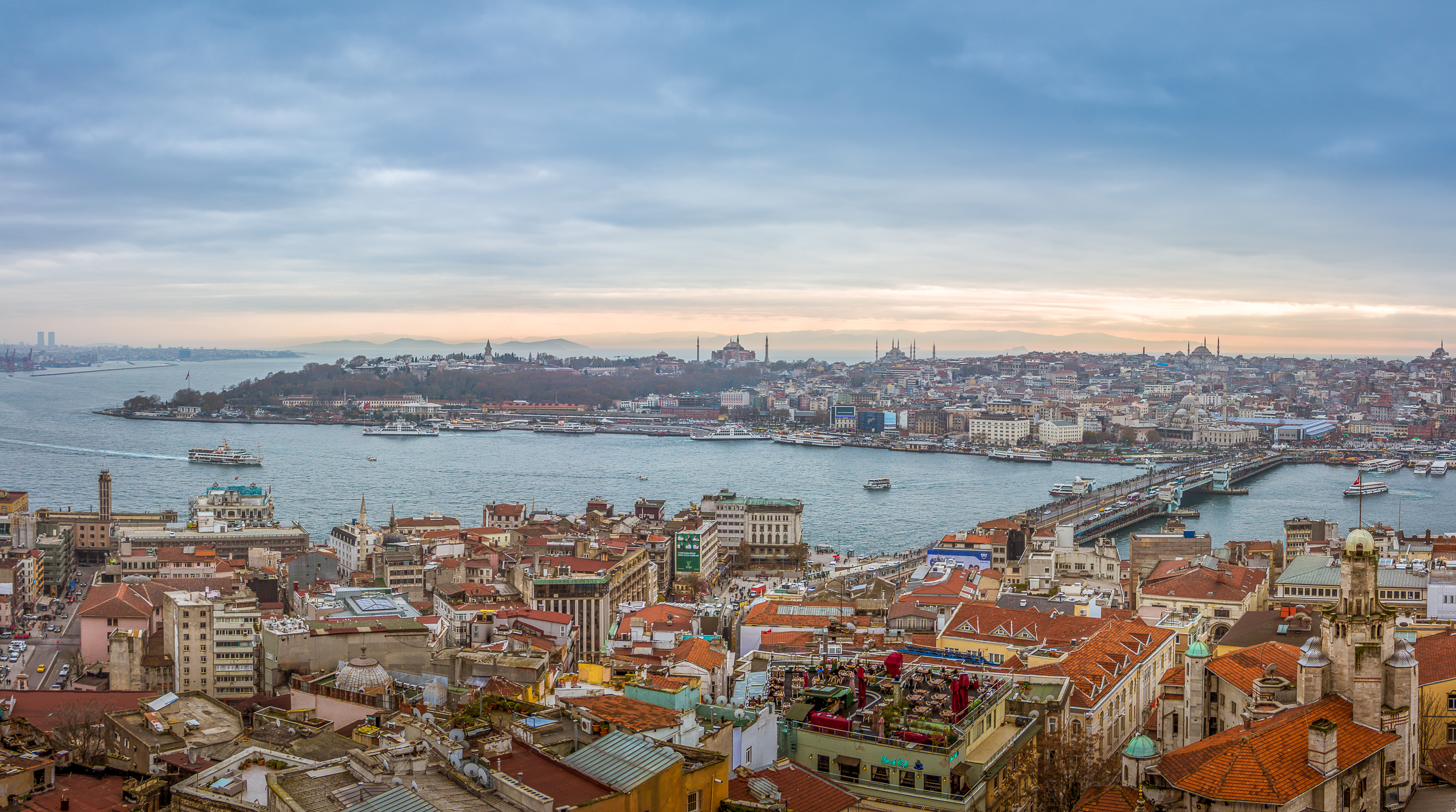
View of the Golden Horn and the Seraglio Point from Galata Tower

The Ottoman dynasty claimed the status of caliphate in 1517, with Constantinople remaining the capital of this last caliphate for four centuries. Suleiman the Magnificent's reign from 1520 to 1566 was a period of especially great artistic and architectural achievement; chief architect Mimar Sinan designed several iconic buildings in the city, while Ottoman arts of ceramics, stained glass, calligraphy, and miniature flourished. The population of Constantinople was 570,000 by the end of the 18th century.

A period of rebellion at the start of the 19th century led to the rise of the progressive Sultan Mahmud II and eventually to the Tanzimat period, which produced political reforms and allowed new technology to be introduced to the city. Bridges across the Golden Horn were constructed during this period, and Constantinople was connected to the rest of the European railway network in the 1880s. Modern facilities, such as a water supply network, electricity, telephones, and trams, were gradually introduced to Constantinople over the following decades, although later than to other European cities. The modernization efforts were not enough to forestall the decline of the Ottoman Empire.

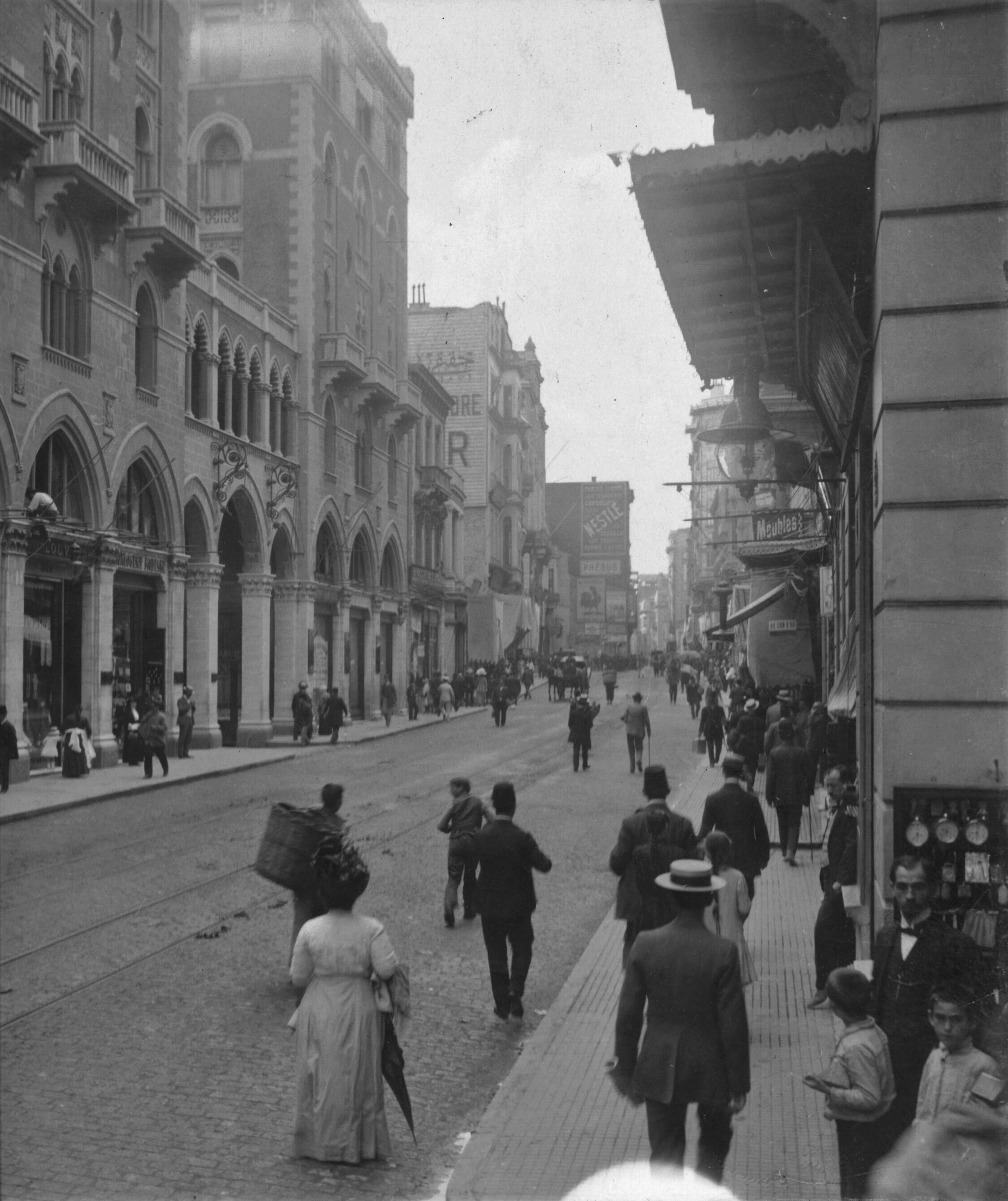
Cadde-i Kebir in 1912 (present-day İstiklal Avenue in Beyoğlu). The entrance of the Church of St. Anthony of Padua is seen at left. A Nestlé advertisement is visible on a building in the background.

With the Young Turk Revolution in 1908, the Ottoman Parliament, closed since 14 February 1878, was reopened 30 years later on 23 July 1908, which marked the beginning of the Second Constitutional Era. The civil strife and political uncertainties in the Ottoman Empire during the months after the revolution encouraged Austria-Hungary to annex Bosnia and Bulgaria to declare its independence in a jointly coordinated move on 5 October 1908. Sultan Abdul Hamid II was deposed in 1909, following the counter-revolution attempt known as the 31 March incident. A series of wars in the early 20th century, such as the Italo-Turkish War (1911–1912) and the Balkan Wars (1912–1913), plagued the ailing empire's capital and resulted in the 1913 Ottoman coup d'état, which brought the regime of the Three Pashas.

The Ottoman Empire joined World War I (1914–1918) on the side of the Central Powers and was ultimately defeated. The deportation of Armenian intellectuals on 24 April 1915 was among the major events which marked the start of the Armenian genocide during WWI. Due to Ottoman and Turkish policies of Turkification and ethnic cleansing, the city's Christian population declined from 450,000 to 240,000 between 1914 and 1927. During World War I, between 1916 and 1918, a number of aerial bombing raids by British aircraft took place in or near Istanbul. The Armistice of Mudros was signed on 30 October 1918. Less than a month later, on 12 November 1918, a ship carrying a French brigade entered the city, beginning the occupation of Constantinople. It was followed by a fleet consisting of British, Italian, Greek, and French ships deploying soldiers on the ground the next day. The subsequent occupation of Smyrna (İzmir), which was back then the second-largest Ottoman city, on 15 May 1919 also marked the beginning of the Turkish War of Independence led by Mustafa Kemal Pasha and the Turkish National Movement, who convened in Erzurum and Sivas for consolidating the resistance groups in Anatolia. The Ottoman Parliament was dissolved by the Allies on 11 April 1920, upon which many of its former members joined the Turkish National Movement headquartered in Ankara, where the Grand National Assembly of Turkey was established on 23 April 1920. Less than four months later, the representatives of the Istanbul-based Ottoman government led by Damat Ferid Pasha signed the Treaty of Sèvres on 10 August 1920, which was rejected by the GNAT in Ankara.

Following the Turkish War of Independence (1919–1922), the Grand National Assembly of Turkey in Ankara abolished the Sultanate on 1 November 1922, and the last Ottoman Sultan, Mehmed VI, was declared persona non grata. Leaving aboard the British warship HMS Malaya on 17 November 1922, he went into exile and died in Sanremo, Italy, on 16 May 1926.

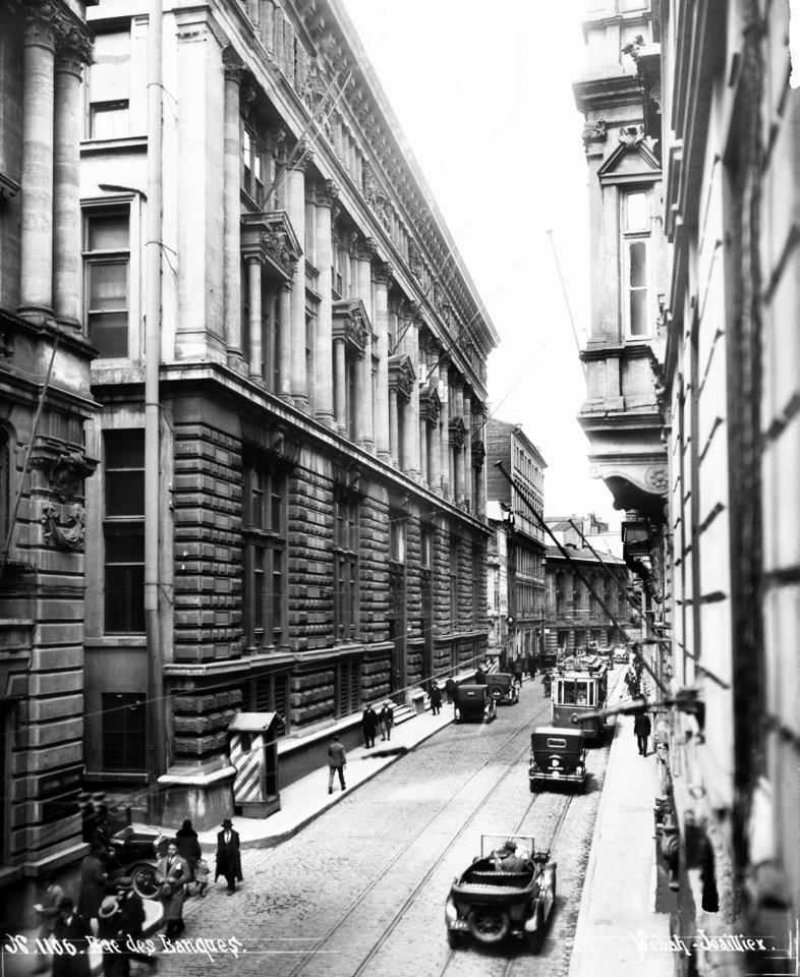
A view of Bankalar Caddesi (Banks Street) in the late 1920s. Completed in 1892, the Ottoman Bank headquarters is seen at left. In 1995 the Istanbul Stock Exchange moved to İstinye, while numerous Turkish banks have moved to Levent and Maslak

The Treaty of Lausanne was signed on 24 July 1923, and the occupation of Constantinople ended with the departure of the last forces of the Allies from the city on 4 October 1923. Turkish forces of the Ankara government, commanded by Şükrü Naili Pasha (3rd Corps), entered the city with a ceremony on 6 October 1923, which has been marked as the "Liberation Day of Istanbul" (İstanbul'un Kurtuluşu), and has been commemorated annually since.

=== Turkish Republic ===
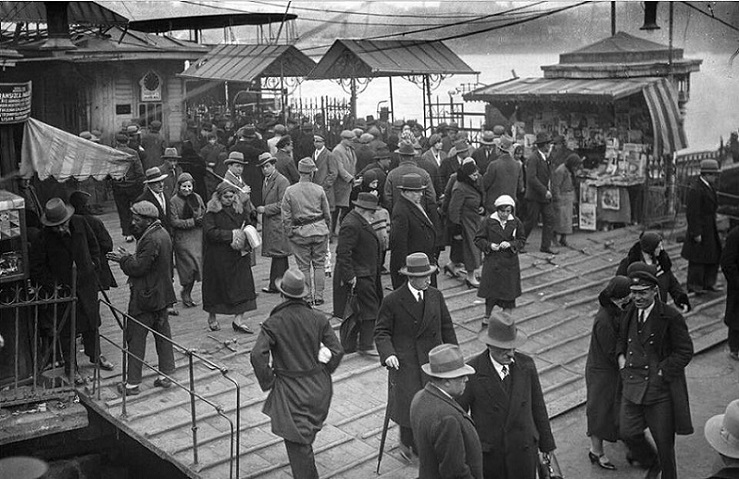
Karaköy ferry pier in the 1930s

On 29 October 1923 the Grand National Assembly of Turkey declared the establishment of the Turkish Republic, with Ankara as its capital. Mustafa Kemal Atatürk became the Republic's first President. The name Constantinople, which remained in use for 1600 years, was officially changed as İstanbul on 28 March 1930; a decision which inspired the lyrics of the 1953 song Istanbul (Not Constantinople), written on the 500th anniversary of the conquest of the city by the Ottoman Turks in 1453. Other city names that were changed with the Postal Services Law (Turkish: Posta Hizmetleri Kanunu) of 28 March 1930 include Angora which was renamed as Ankara, and Smyrna which was renamed as İzmir, among other examples of internationally used city names that were replaced by officially standardized Turkish names.

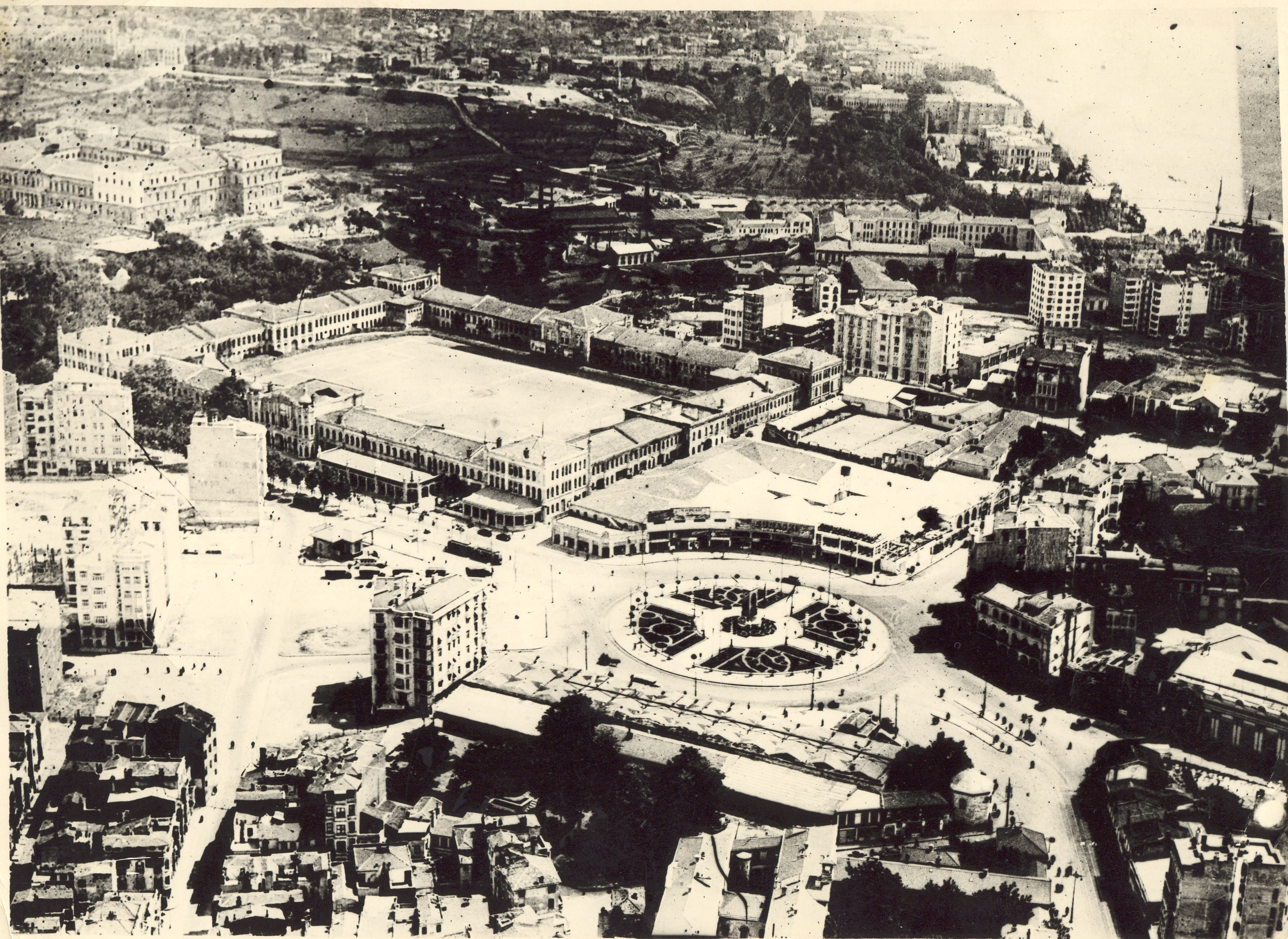
Taksim Square, c. 1936

From the 1930s onward, with large-scale urban planning efforts initially led by Henri Prost between 1936 and 1950 and continued by his colleagues such as Luigi Piccinato in later years, Istanbul underwent great structural change, as new public squares, boulevards, avenues and parks were constructed throughout the city, often at the expense of historical buildings; such as Taksim Square, Taksim Gezi Park, Vatan Caddesi, Atatürk Bulvarı, Kemeraltı Caddesi, Meclis-i Mebusan Caddesi, Barbaros Bulvarı, Cumhuriyet Caddesi and Tarlabaşı Bulvarı, among others.

The 1942 wealth tax during World War II, which was levied with much higher rates on non-Muslims, led to the transfer or liquidation of many businesses owned by religious minorities. The 1955 Istanbul pogrom, during which numerous Greeks (with various estimates) were killed, wounded or sexually assaulted, led to the emigration of most of the remaining Greeks in Istanbul. Further mass expulsions of Istanbulite Greeks took place in 1964–1965, when those who were officially citizens of Greece but were allowed to stay in Turkey according to the Treaty of Lausanne and were exempted from the population exchange were ordered to promptly leave the country, including those with a spouse who held Turkish citizenship. The decision was made after Turkey and Greece came to the brink of war in 1964 over violent clashes in Cyprus, which was averted through the intervention by U.S. president Lyndon B. Johnson, who wanted to prevent a conflict between two NATO members at the height of the Cold War. As a result of these policies, the Greek population of Istanbul decreased from 110,000 in 1919 to 2,500 by the end of the 20th century.

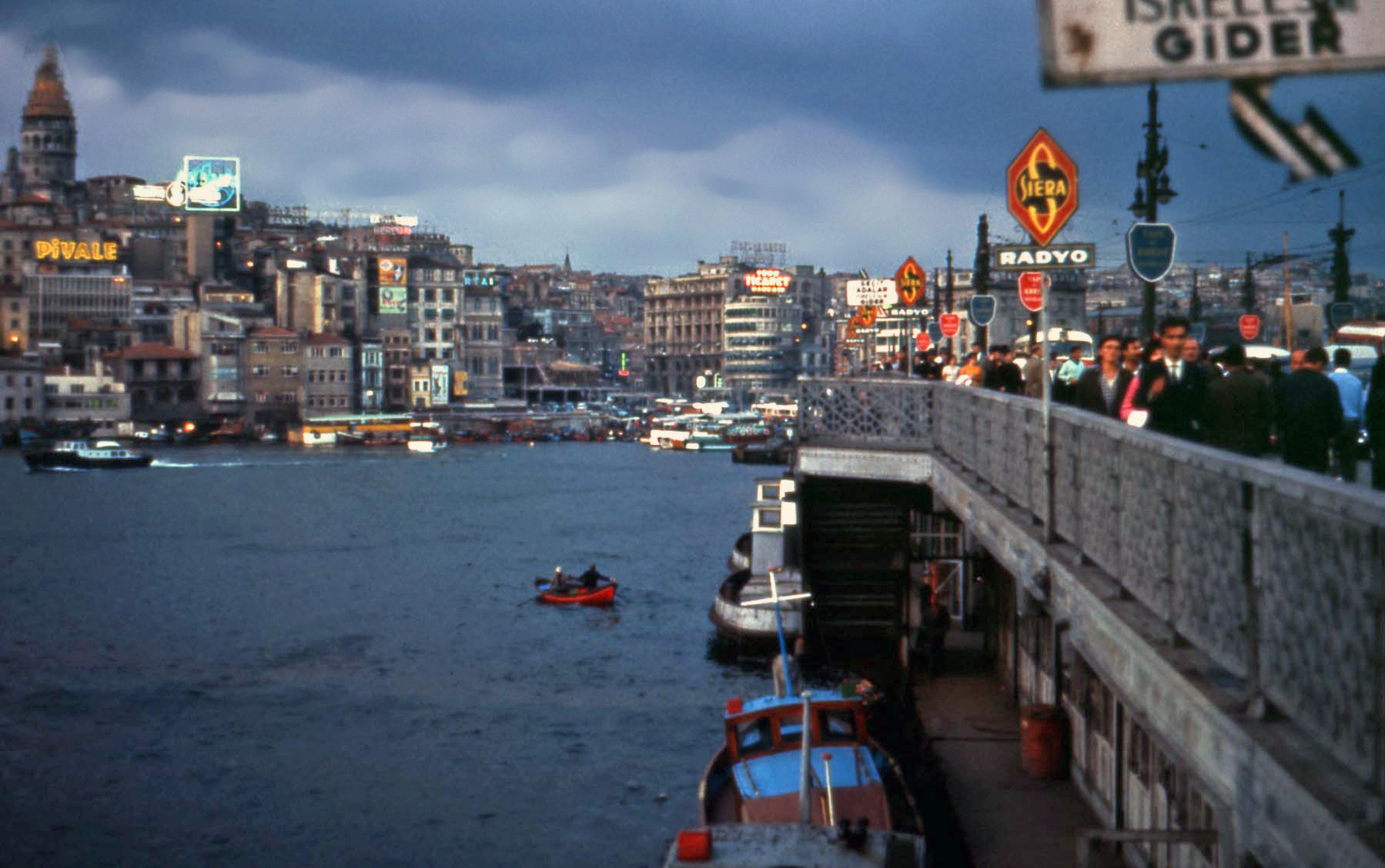
A view of the fourth Galata Bridge (1912–1992) in 1966, with the restoration works (1965–1967) of the conical roof of Galata Tower (the previous one was removed in the 19th century) (Note: According to some sources, the conical roof of Galata Tower was destroyed by a storm in 1875, but photographs taken by foreign travelers such as James Robertson, Ernest De Caranza and Francis Bedford in the 19th century have revealed that the conical roof, which existed in 1854, was removed by 1862. The photo taken by Francis Bedford on 21 May 1862 reveals that there were ongoing reparation (or modification) works in 1862, and the flag pole on top was also temporarily missing. Either the "storm in 1875" had actually happened earlier, c. 1862, or the uppermost part of the tower was simply modified or reconstructed c. 1862. Another probability is that the conical roof which was reconstructed c. 1862 might have been destroyed a few years later by a storm in 1875.) visible at left.

Turkey suffered from political turmoil and economic crises between 1960 and 1980, and the emigration of Istanbul's ethnic and religious minorities, mainly to Europe and North America, continued in this period; while new laws with the aim of Turkification were introduced, such as the nationalization or closure of private higher education institutions in 1971. As a result, the college section of Robert College (RC) in Istanbul, which offered 4-year bachelor's degree programs (e.g. the programs of the School of Engineering) and master's degree programs (e.g. in Industrial Engineering), was nationalized and reorganized as Boğaziçi University in 1971; while its high school section, formerly named Robert Academy (RA), continues to operate as an American high school, with the Turkish name Robert Kolej referring mainly to the still active high school section since 1971. Applying the same law of 1971, the Turkish Ministry of National Education proposed to attach the Theological School of Halki (Heybeliada) to the Faculty of Theology (İlahiyat Fakültesi) at Istanbul University, but the Greek Orthodox Patriarchate, citing the Treaty of Lausanne, refused to accept this change and decided to keep the school closed until the restoration of its previous legal status, which was annulled on 9 July 1971. The autonomy of Turkish universities, granted with Article 120 of the Turkish Constitution of 1961, was suspended in 1971 and annulled in 1981. The Council of Higher Education, established on 6 November 1981 when Turkey was administered by the National Security Council chaired by General Kenan Evren between 1980 and 1983, is responsible for supervising the universities in Turkey, in a capacity defined by Article 130 of the Turkish Constitution of 1982. Civilian rule was restored with the 1983 general elections.

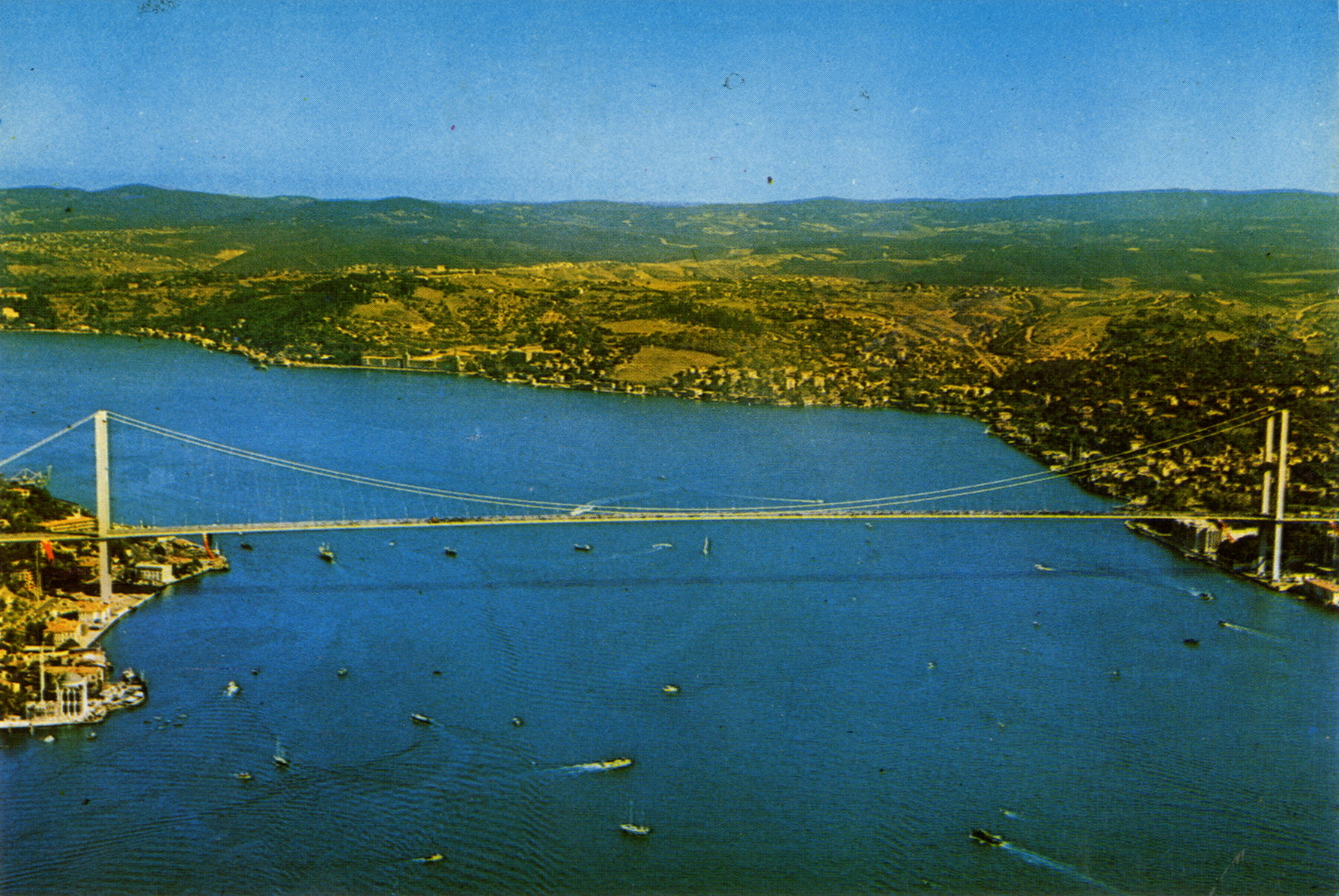
The Bosphorus Bridge in 1973

The overall population of Istanbul began to rapidly increase in the 1970s, as people from Anatolia migrated to the city to find employment in the many new factories that were built on the outskirts of the sprawling metropolis. This sudden, sharp rise in the city's population caused a large demand for housing, and many previously outlying villages and forests became engulfed into the metropolitan area of Istanbul as a result of urban sprawl. The Bosphorus Bridge, which connects the city's European and Asian parts, was opened in 1973 and significantly contributed to the increase in migration from Anatolia. It was followed by other bridges and tunnels which span the Bosphorus strait, namely the Fatih Sultan Mehmet Bridge (1988), Marmaray Tunnel (2013), Yavuz Sultan Selim Bridge (2016), and Eurasia Tunnel (2016).

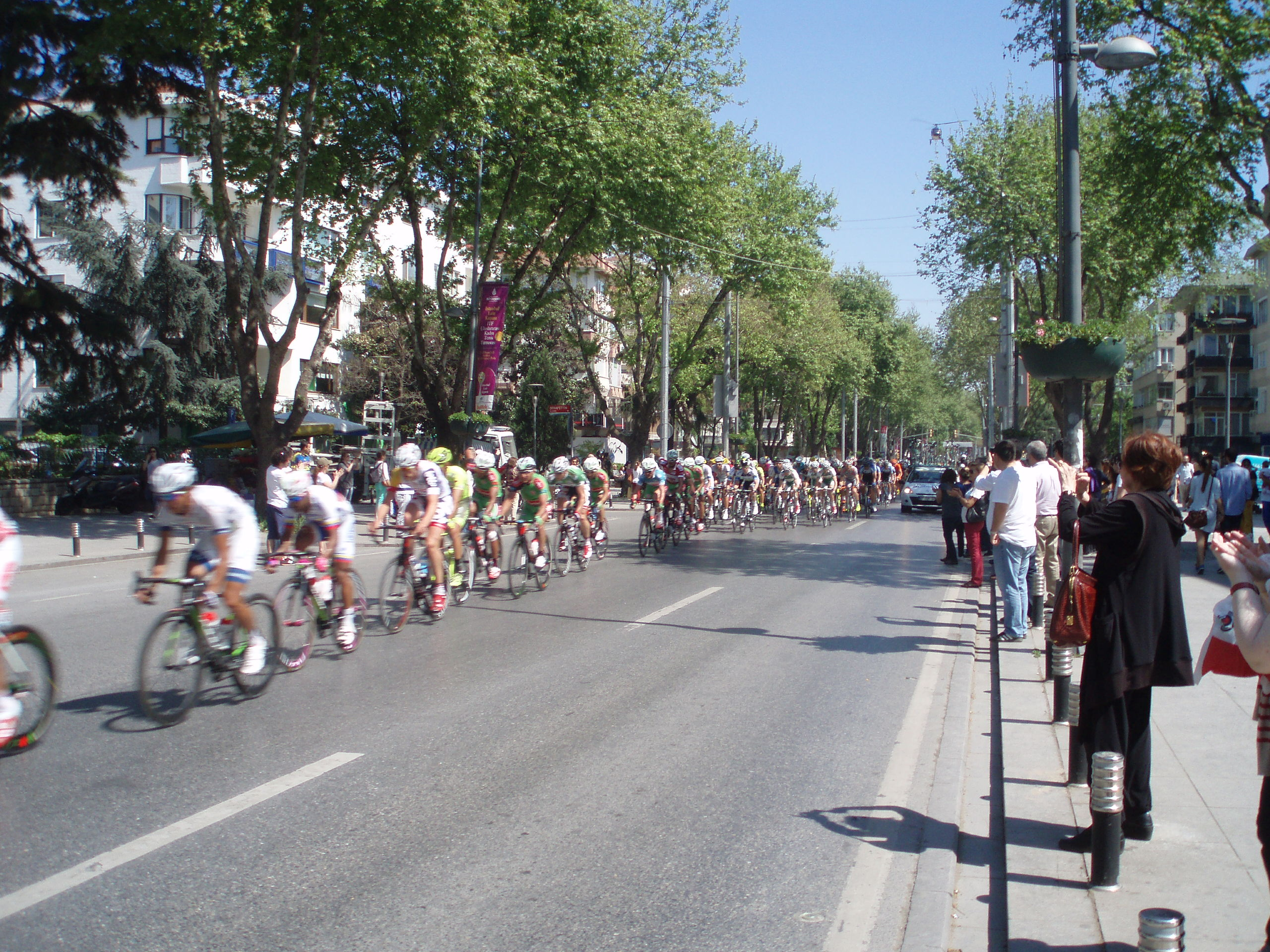
Bağdat Avenue is the main shopping street in the Asian side

Built in the latter half of the 1980s, the Sahilyolu (Coastal Road), a scenic road along the Marmara coast of the Anatolian side of the city, parallel to Bağdat Avenue and facing the Princes' Islands (with the part between Caddebostan and Bostancı named as the Çetin Emeç Bulvarı, and the part between Bostancı and Pendik named as the Turgut Özal Bulvarı), had a major impact on the growth and development of the districts in the city's Asian side. Istanbul Sea Buses, operating between the city's European and Asian sides, were also introduced in this period, with the first generation of 10 fast catamaran ferries built by Kvaerner Fjellstrand in Norway entering service in 1987.

In 1990 the pedestrianization of İstiklal Avenue in Beyoğlu was completed and the nostalgic trams were reintroduced. Tarlabaşı Bulvarı in Beyoğlu was built in the same period as a new route for diverting the motor vehicle traffic which previously flowed along İstiklal Avenue before its pedestrianization.

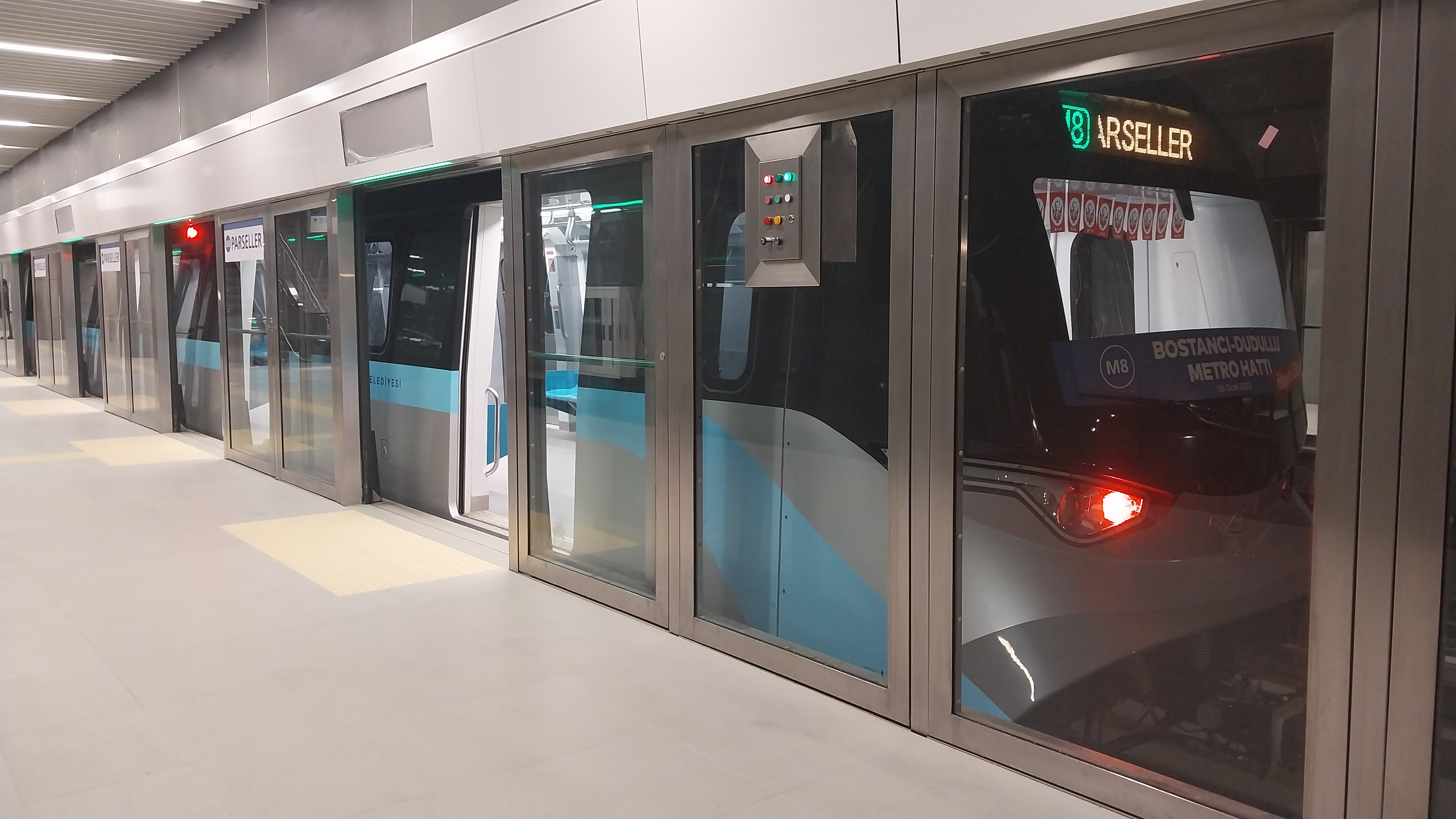
Istanbul Metro's M8 line is among the new lines with fully automated driverless trains and platform screen doors for increasing passenger safety

The M1 line of the Istanbul Metro was opened in 1989. It was followed by the M2 (2000), M4 (2012), M3 (2013), M6 (2015), M5 (2017), M7 (2020), M9 (2021), M8 (2023) and M11 (2023) lines. The M10, M12, M13 and M14 lines are currently under construction. The lines on the European and Asian sides of the city are connected by the Marmaray Tunnel underneath the Bosphorus strait.

Atatürk Airport, originally named Yeşilköy Airport, was built in 1912 as an airfield for the Ottoman Aviation Squadrons. In 1933 it became a civilian airport and the hub of Turkish Airlines for domestic flights. The first international flight, between Istanbul and Athens, took place in 1947. In 1953 the airport terminal building was opened; it was the location of a few scenes in the 1963 James Bond film From Russia with Love. A new international terminal building was constructed by TAV between 1998 and 2004, and the previous building became the domestic flights terminal. Atatürk Airport remained as Istanbul's main international airport until the end of passenger flights and the closure of the passenger terminals in 2019 (cargo flights ended in 2022). Since 2019, Istanbul Airport, the current hub of Turkish Airlines and one of the largest airports in the world, is the main international airport in the city's European side. Sabiha Gökçen International Airport, the main airport in the city's Asian side, was opened in 2001.

In the late 20th and early 21st centuries, Istanbul became the new home of immigrants, residents and refugees from various countries, such as Bulgaria, Bosnia and Herzegovina, Serbia, Kosovo, North Macedonia, the Turkic states of the Caspian basin, Russia, Ukraine, Moldova, the Arab states of the Persian Gulf, Syria, Iran, Afghanistan, Pakistan, Libya, Sudan, Eritrea, Somalia, Ethiopia, Kenya, Senegal, Ghana, Nigeria and other countries mainly in Europe, Asia and Africa.

== Geography and environment ==
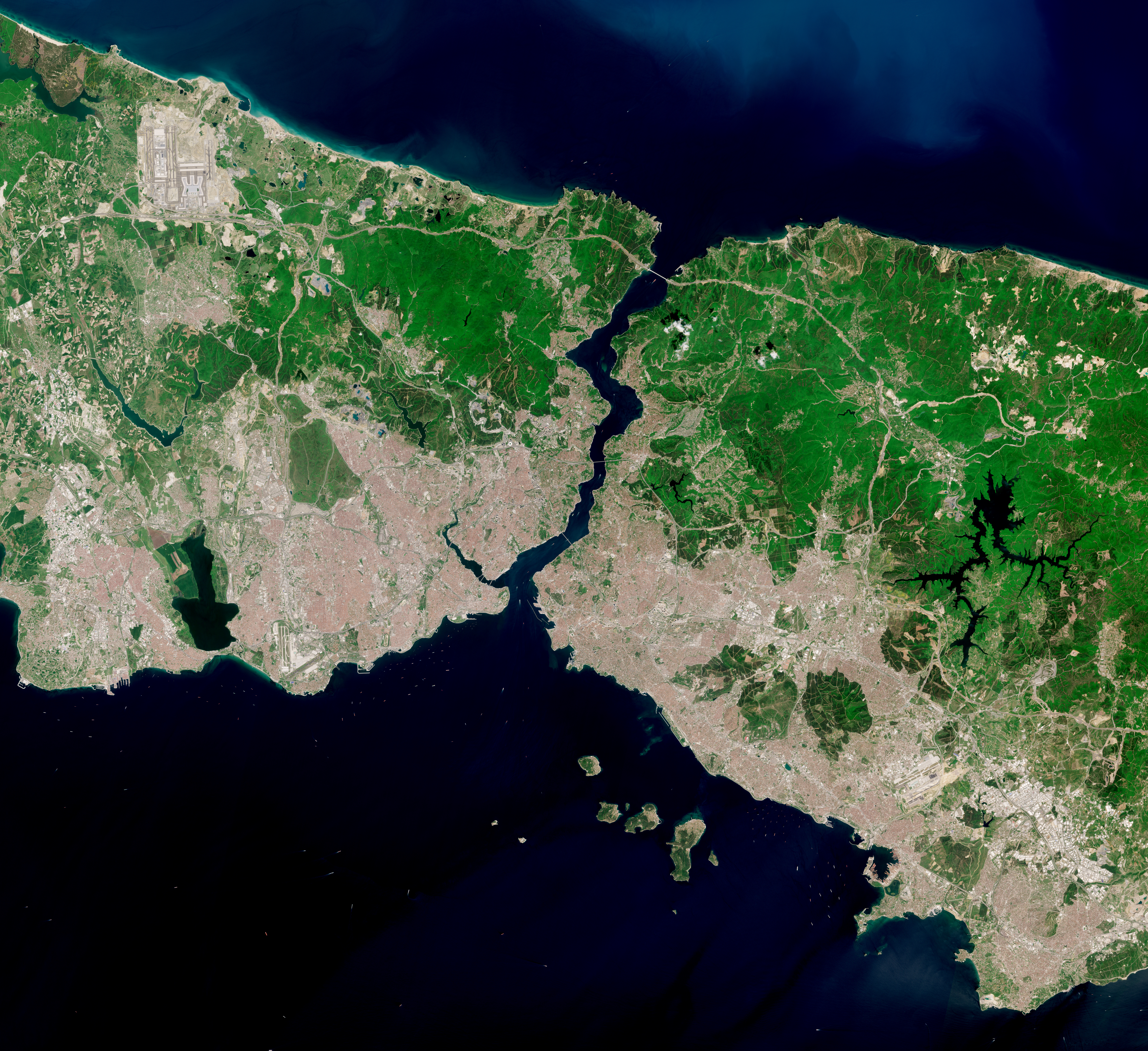
Satellite view of Istanbul and the Bosporus

Istanbul is in north-western Turkey and straddles the Bosporus Strait, which provides the only passage from the Black Sea to the Mediterranean via the Sea of Marmara. Historically, the city has been ideally situated for trade and defense: The confluence of the Sea of Marmara, the Bosporus, and the Golden Horn provide both ideal defense against enemy attack and a natural toll-gate. Several picturesque islands – Büyükada, Heybeliada, Burgazada, Kınalıada, and five smaller islands – are part of the city. Istanbul's shoreline has grown beyond its natural limits. Large sections of Caddebostan sit on areas of landfill, increasing the total area of the city to 5,343 square kilometers (2,063 sq mi).

Despite the myth that seven hills make up the city, there are, in fact, more than 50 hills within the city limits. Istanbul's tallest hill, Aydos, is 537 meters (1,762 ft) high.

=== Earthquakes ===
The North Anatolian Fault, under the Sea of Marmara, is locked just south of the city. This fault caused the earthquakes in 1766 and 1894, and a quake of at least magnitude 7.0 is very likely in the 21st century, though an earthquake with a magnitude above 7.5 is thought to be impossible. Istanbul Municipality's Directorate of Earthquake and Ground Research is responsible for analysing the methods to reduce the urban seismic risk, whereas the national government-controlled Disaster and Emergency Management Presidency is responsible for earthquake emergency response, and will be helped by NGOs such as İHH.

The threat of major earthquakes plays a large role in the city's infrastructure development, with over 500,000 vulnerable buildings demolished and replaced since 2012. According to ministry statements and geologist comments made in 2023, the city's infrastructure was in reasonably good shape, however, due to very high costs, buildings were not: over half a million flats were still vulnerable to collapse, and casualties largely depend on how many collapse. As of 2024, most buildings in Istanbul were built to a low seismic standard in the 20th century, and residents think the city is not properly prepared for the earthquake. On 23 April 2025 an earthquake with a preliminary magnitude of 6.2 shook the city and other areas. Many people were treated for injuries they suffered while trying to jump from buildings or for panic attacks. The earthquake was felt as far as provinces of Tekirdağ, Yalova, Bursa and Balıkesir and in the coastal city of İzmir.

=== Climate ===
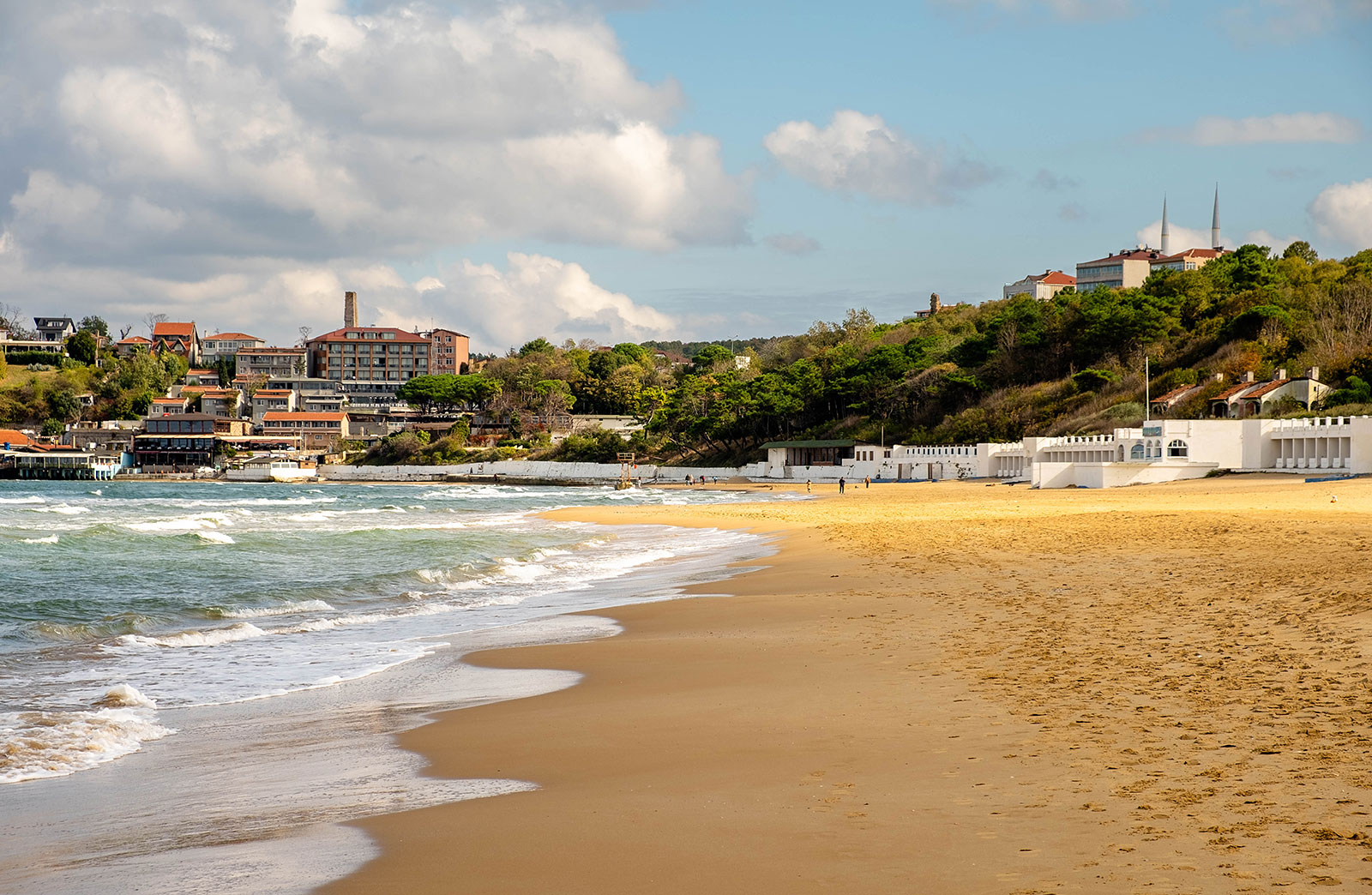
Şile and Kilyos are two seaside resorts on the Black Sea, the body of water which tempers Istanbul's climate

Istanbul's climate is temperate; the city's position on the Mediterranean basin and proximity to bodies of water create a moderate, yet locally complicated climate with strong maritime features. According to the Köppen climate classification, the city is considered either hot-summer Mediterranean (Csa) or humid subtropical (Cfa), while Trewartha considers most of the city to be humid subtropical (Cf). Alisov places the entire city into the oceanic (PmSm) zone, meanwhile Bohn, summarizing, describes the city's climate as one of "sub-continental-sub-Mediterranean transition".

The city's summers are warm to hot and moderately dry, with an average daytime temperature of about 28 °C (82 °F), and less than 7 days of precipitation per month. Despite the generally acceptable temperature range, mid-summer in Istanbul is considered moderately uncomfortable, due to high dew points and relative humidity. Winters, meanwhile, feature daytime temperatures oscillating between 5–10 °C (41–50 °F), with frequent, sometimes intense, precipitation.

Istanbul's precipitation is therefore unevenly distributed, with winter months getting at least twice the level of precipitation of their summerly counterparts. Cloudiness, as with precipitation, varies greatly by season. Winters are quite cloudy, with about 20% of days featuring sunshine. Meanwhile, summers experience 60-70% of possible sunshine.

Snowfall is sporadic, but accumulates virtually every winter; and when it does, it is highly disruptive to city infrastructure. Sea-effect snowstorms with more than 30 centimetres (1 ft) of snowfall happen almost annually, most recently in 2022.

Climate data for Kireçburnu (normals 1991–2020, precipitation days and sunshine 1981–2010; see the main article for more information)
Month	Jan	Feb	Mar	Apr	May	Jun	Jul	Aug	Sep	Oct	Nov	Dec	Year
Mean daily maximum °C (°F)	8.8 (47.8)	9.4 (48.9)	12.0 (53.6)	16.1 (61.0)	21.0 (69.8)	25.7 (78.3)	28.0 (82.4)	28.2 (82.8)	24.6 (76.3)	19.9 (67.8)	15.0 (59.0)	10.7 (51.3)	18.3 (64.9)
Daily mean °C (°F)	5.9 (42.6)	6.1 (43.0)	8.0 (46.4)	11.5 (52.7)	16.3 (61.3)	21.1 (70.0)	23.7 (74.7)	24.2 (75.6)	20.5 (68.9)	16.2 (61.2)	11.7 (53.1)	7.9 (46.2)	14.4 (58.0)
Mean daily minimum °C (°F)	3.6 (38.5)	3.5 (38.3)	4.9 (40.8)	8.1 (46.6)	12.8 (55.0)	17.4 (63.3)	20.3 (68.5)	21.2 (70.2)	17.4 (63.3)	13.6 (56.5)	9.2 (48.6)	5.5 (41.9)	11.5 (52.6)
Average precipitation mm (inches)	96.1 (3.78)	87.7 (3.45)	69.8 (2.75)	45.1 (1.78)	37.1 (1.46)	44.7 (1.76)	36.3 (1.43)	43.5 (1.71)	81.3 (3.20)	98.3 (3.87)	100.5 (3.96)	124.8 (4.91)	865.2 (34.06)
Average precipitation days (≥ 0.1 mm)	16.9	15.2	13.2	10.0	7.4	7.0	4.7	5.1	8.1	12.3	13.9	17.5	131.3
Average snowy days (≥ 0.1 cm)	4.5	4.7	2.9	0.1	0.0	0.0	0.0	0.0	0.0	0.0	0.3	2.7	15.2
Average relative humidity (%)	79.8	78.6	75.8	75.1	76.5	75.7	75.3	75.9	75.0	78.4	78.9	78.4	76.9
Mean monthly sunshine hours	68.2	89.6	142.6	180.0	248.0	297.6	319.3	288.3	234.0	158.1	93.0	62.0	2,180.7
Percentage possible sunshine	22	29	38	46	57	64	69	66	65	46	31	22	46

==== Climate change ====
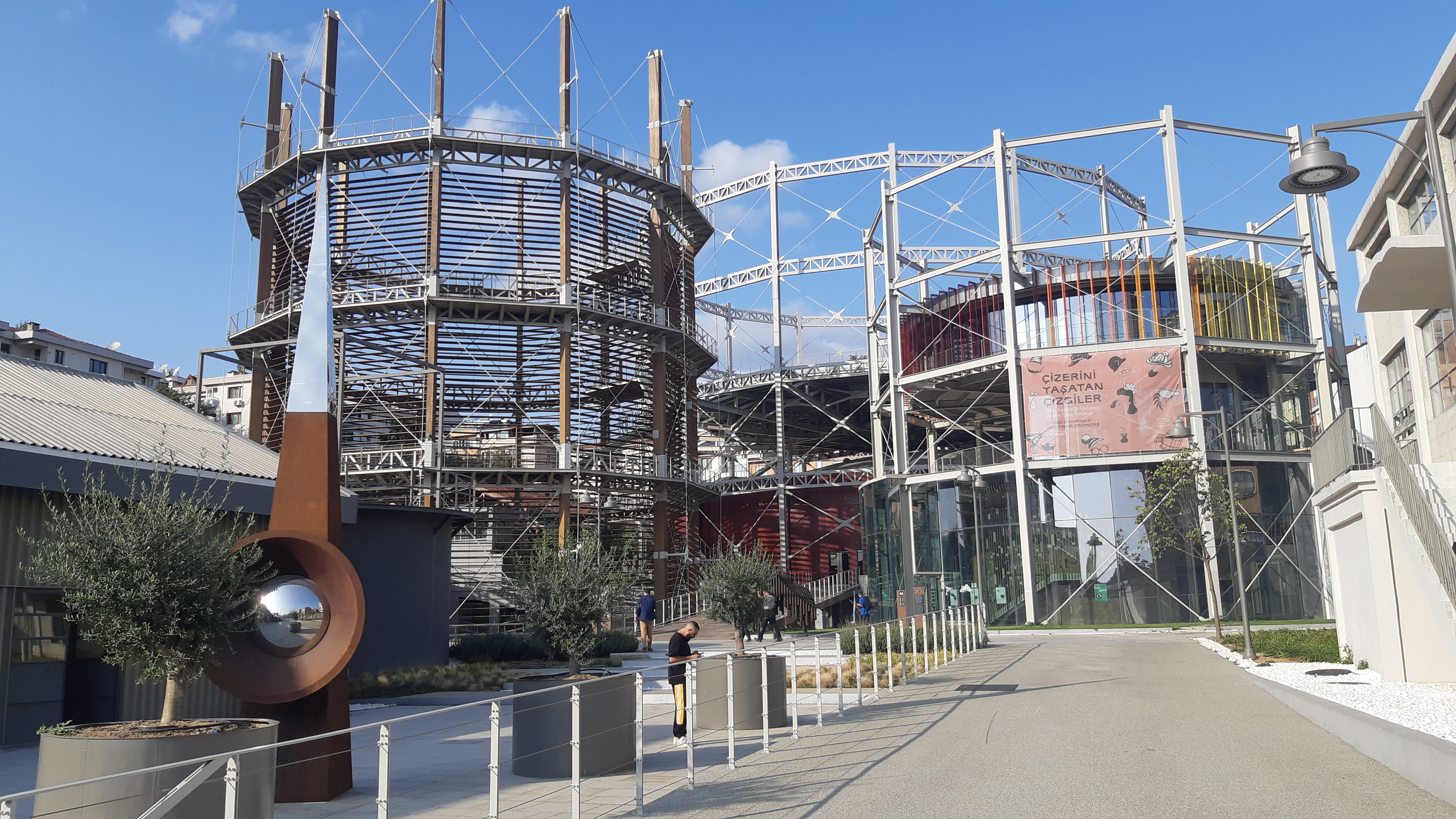
Müze Gazhane in Kadıköy is the first climate change museum in Turkey

Climate change has caused an increase in Istanbul's heatwaves, droughts, storms, and flooding. Furthermore, as Istanbul is a large and rapidly expanding city, its urban heat island has been intensifying the effects of climate change. If trends continue, sea level rise is likely to affect city infrastructure, for example Kadıkoy metro station is threatened with flooding. Xeriscaping of green spaces has been suggested, and Istanbul has a climate-change action plan.

=== Water ===
Water supply and sanitation in Istanbul is stressed by the expansion of the city. It is the responsibility of the public utility ISKI (Istanbul Su ve Kanalizasyon Idaresi) created in 1981.

=== Flora and fauna ===
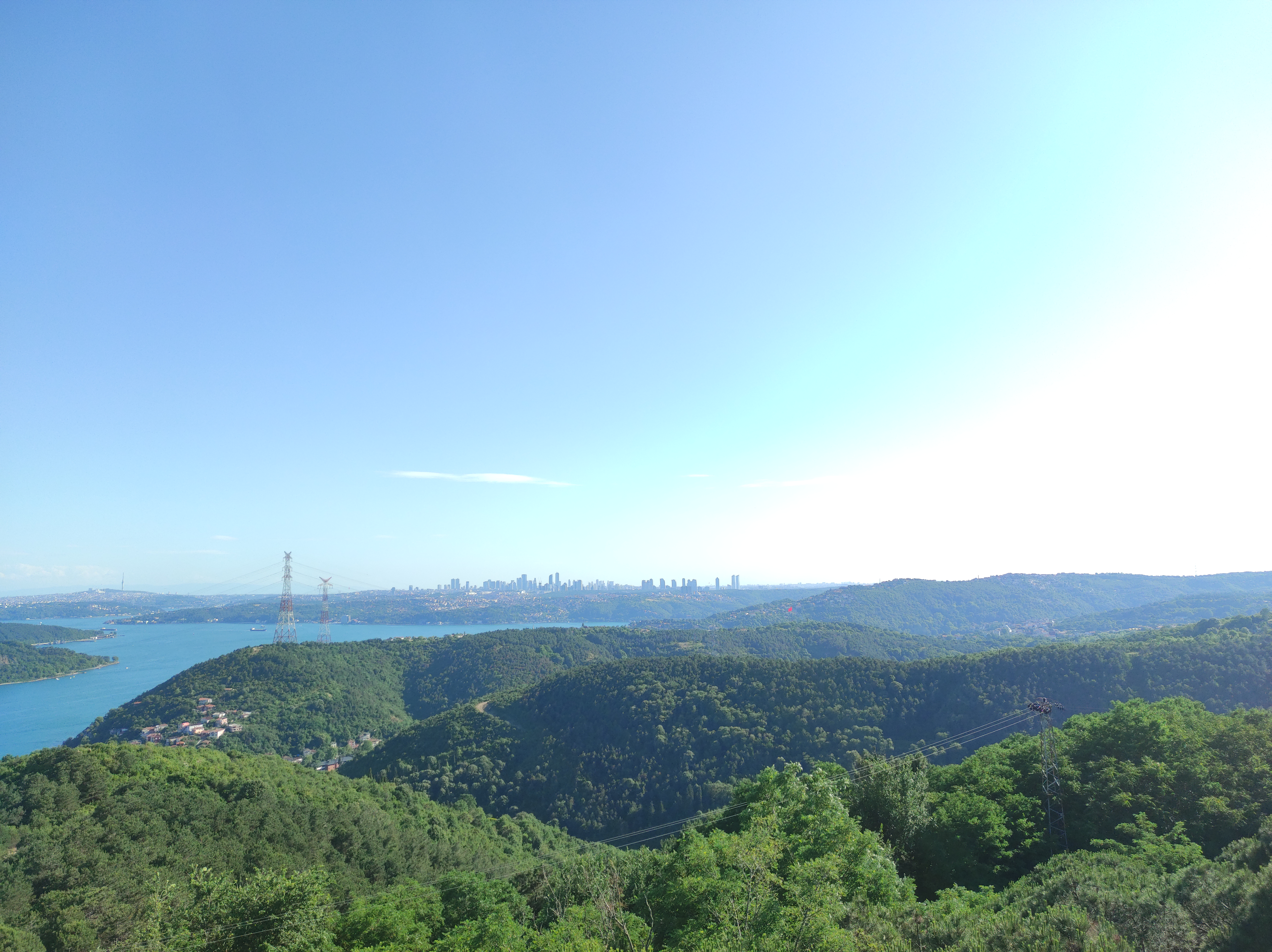
Northern Istanbul as seen from the bird observatory tower in Sarıyer

The natural vegetation of the province is made up of mixed broadleaf forest and pseudo-maquis, reflecting the city's transitional, Mediterranean-influenced humid temperate climate. Chestnut, oak, elm, linden, ash and locust comprise the most prominent temperate forest genera, while laurel, terebinth, Cercis siliquastrum, broom, red firethorn, and oak species such as Quercus cerris and Quercus coccifera are the most important species of Mediterranean and Submediterranean distribution. Apart from the natural flora, Platanus orentalis, horse chestnut, cypress and stone pine make up the introduced species that got acclimatized to Istanbul. In a study that examined urban flora in Kartal, a total of 576 plant taxa were recorded; of those 477 were natural and 99 were exotic and cultivated. The most prominent native taxa were in the Asteraceae family (50 species), while the most diverse exotic plant family was Rosaceae (16 species).

Turkish Straits and Sea of Marmara play a vital role for migrating fish and other marine animals between Mediterranean, Marmara and Black Sea. Bosporus hosts pelagic, demersal and semipelagic fish species and more than 130 different taxa have been documented in the strait. Bluefish, bonito, sea bass, horse mackerel and anchovies compose the economically important species. Fish diversity in the waters of Istanbul has dwindled in the recent decades. From about 60 different fish species recorded in the 1970s, only 20 of them still survive in the Bosporus. Common bottlenose dolphin (Turkish: afalina), short-beaked common dolphin (Turkish: tırtak) and harbor porpoise (Turkish: mutur) make up the marine mammals presently found in the Bosporus and surrounding waters, though since the 1950s the number of dolphin observations has become increasingly rare. Mediterranean monk seals were present in Bosporus, and Princes' Islands and Tuzla shores were seal breeding areas during summer, but they have not been observed in Istanbul since the 1960s and thought to be extinct in the region. Water pollution, overfishing and destruction of coastal habitats caused by urbanization are main threats to Istanbul's marine ecology.

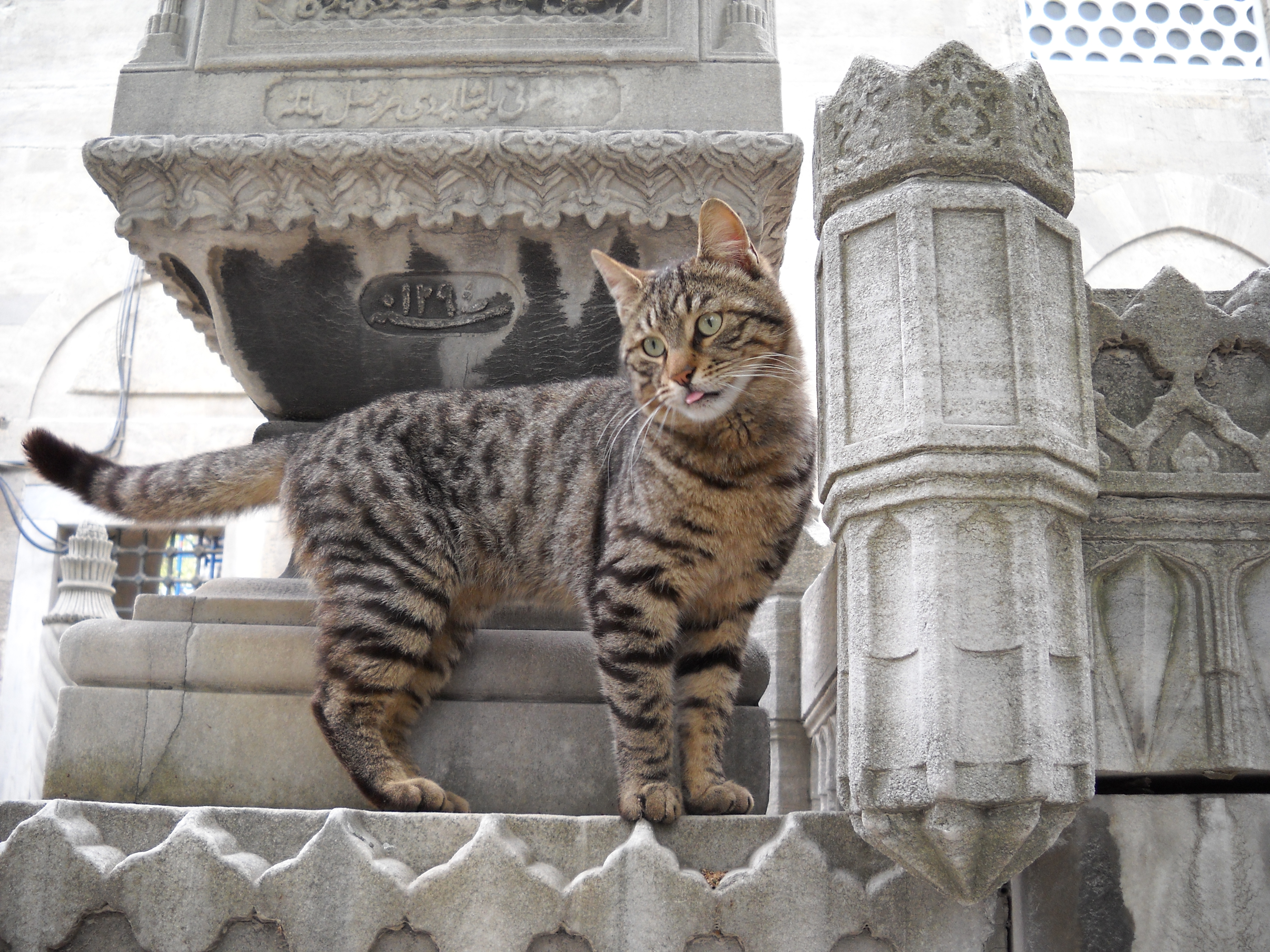
A street cat in Istanbul

Apart from the wild land mammals Istanbul hosts a sizeable stray animal population. The presence of feral cats in Istanbul (Turkish: sokak kedisi) is noted to be very prevalent, with estimates ranging from a hundred thousand to over a million stray cats. The feral cats in the city have gained widespread media and public attention and are considered to be symbols of the city. Rose-ringed parakeet colonies are present in urban areas, similar to other European cities as feral parrots, and considered as invasive species.

=== Pollution ===
Air pollution in Turkey is acute in İstanbul with cars, buses and taxis causing frequent urban smog, as it is one of the few European cities without a low-emission zone. As of 2019 the city's mean air quality remains at a level so as to affect the heart and lungs of healthy street bystanders during peak traffic hours, and almost 200 days of pollution were measured by the air pollution sensors at Sultangazi, Mecidiyeköy, Alibeyköy and Kağıthane. It is one of the 10 worst cities for NO_{2}. However a trial of congestion pricing is planned for the historic peninsula.

Algal blooms and red tides were reported in the Sea of Marmara and Bosporus (especially in Golden Horn), and regularly happen in urban lakes such as Lake Büyükçekmece and Küçükçekmece. In June 2021, a marine mucilage wave allegedly caused by water pollution spread to Sea of Marmara.

== Cityscape ==
=== Districts and neighborhoods ===
==== European side ====
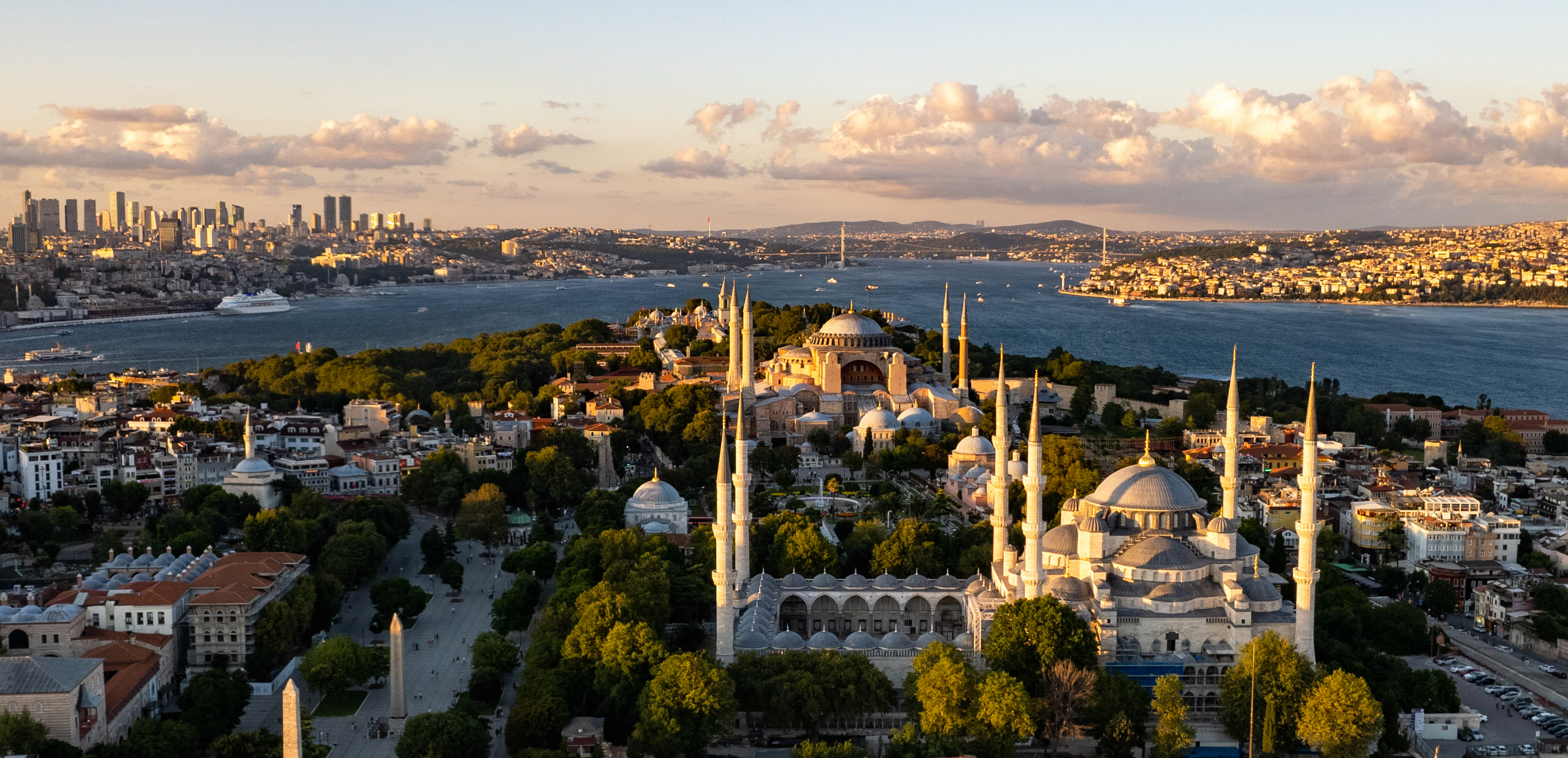
Fatih district comprises the historical peninsula of Istanbul

Rumeli ("Rumelia") is a local nickname for the European side of Istanbul.

The Fatih district, which was named after Mehmed II (Turkish: Fatih Sultan Mehmed), corresponds to what was the whole of Constantinople until the Ottoman conquest; today it is the capital district and called the historic peninsula of Istanbul on the southern shore of the Golden Horn, across the medieval Genoese citadel of Galata on the northern shore. The Genoese fortifications in Galata were largely demolished in the 19th century, leaving only the Galata Tower, to make way for the northward expansion of the city. Galata (Karaköy) is today a quarter within the Beyoğlu district, which forms Istanbul's commercial and entertainment center and includes İstiklal Avenue and Taksim Square.

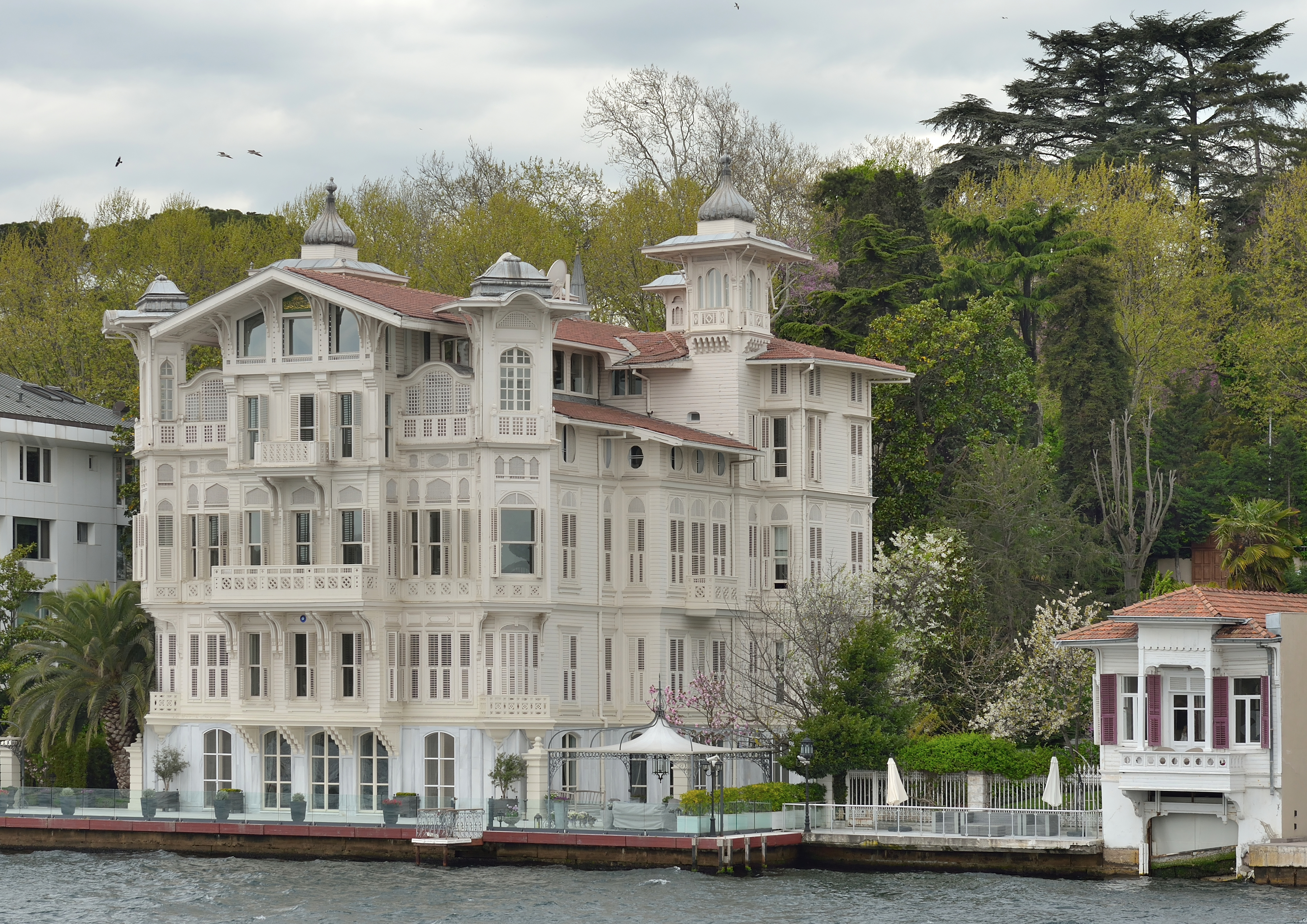
Originally outside the city, yalı residences along the Bosporus are now homes in some of Istanbul's elite neighborhoods

Dolmabahçe Palace, the seat of government during the late Ottoman period, is in the Beşiktaş district on the European shore of the Bosporus, to the north of Beyoğlu. The former village of Ortaköy is within Beşiktaş and gives its name to the Ortaköy Mosque on the Bosporus, near the Bosporus Bridge. Lining both the European and Asian shores of the Bosporus are the historic yalıs, luxurious chalet mansions built by Ottoman aristocrats and elites as summer homes. Inland, north of Taksim Square is the Istanbul Central Business District, a set of corridors lined with office buildings, residential towers, shopping centers, and university campuses, and over 2,000,000 m^{2} (22,000,000 sq ft) of class-A office space in total. Maslak, Levent, and Bomonti are important nodes within the CBD.

The Atatürk Airport corridor is another such edge city-style business, residential and shopping corridor with over 900,000 m^{2} (9,700,000 sq ft) of class-A office space.

==== Asian side ====
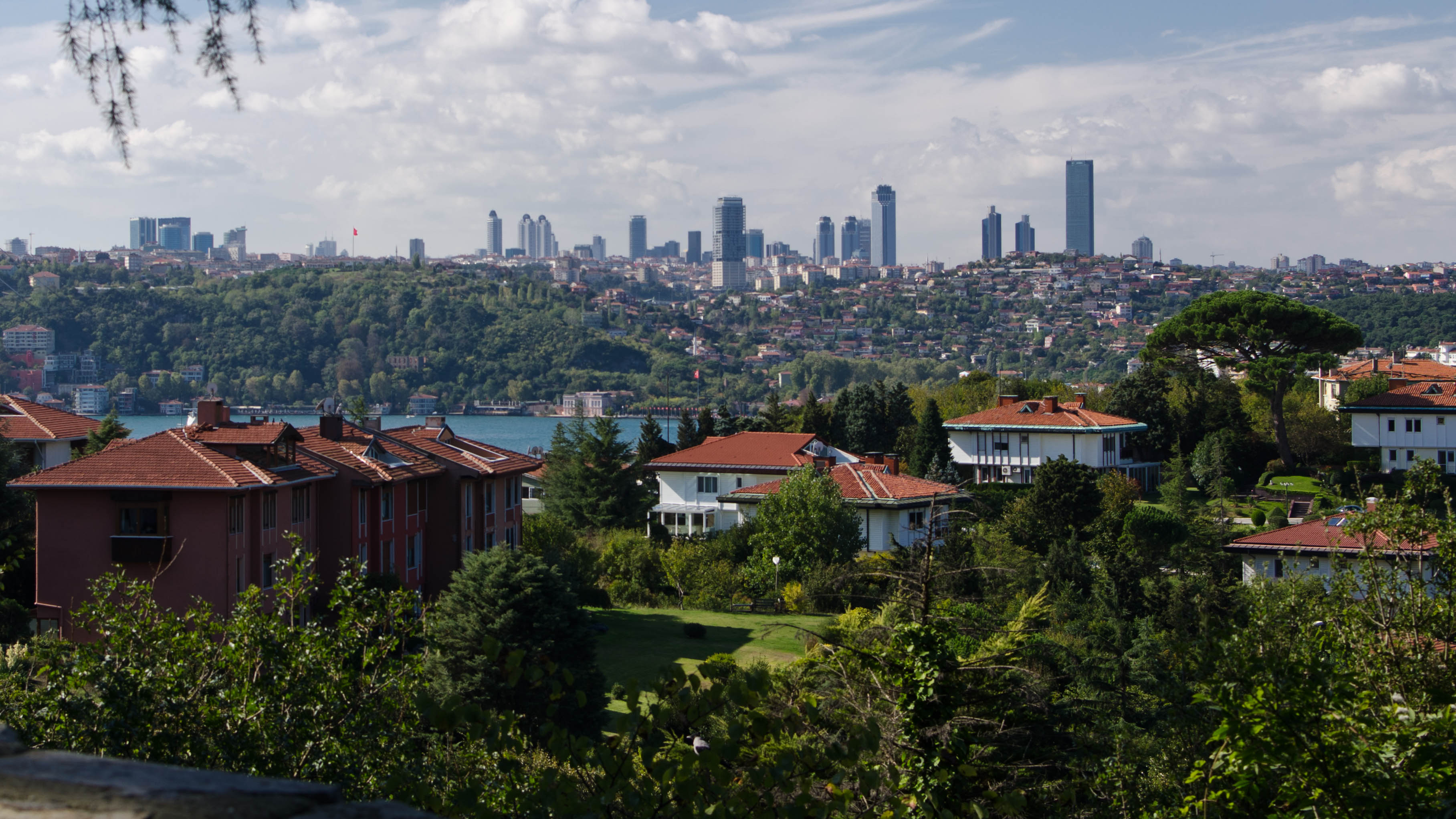
A view of Levent from Kanlıca across the Bosporus

During the Ottoman period, Üsküdar (then Scutari) and Kadıköy were outside the scope of the urban area, serving as tranquil outposts with seaside yalıs and gardens. But in the second half of the 20th century, the Asian side experienced major urban growth; the late development of this part of the city led to better infrastructure and tidier urban planning when compared with most other residential areas in the city. Much of the Asian side of the Bosporus functions as a suburb of the economic and commercial centers in European Istanbul, accounting for a third of the city's population but only a quarter of its employment. However, Kozyatağı–Ataşehir, Altunizade, Kavacık and Ümraniye, all together having about 1.4 million sqm of class-A office space, are now important "edge cities", i.e. corridors and nodes of business and shopping centers and of tall residential buildings.

==== Expansion ====
As a result of Istanbul's exponential growth in the 20th century, a significant portion of the city is composed of gecekondus (literally "built overnight"), referring to illegally constructed squatter buildings. At present, some gecekondu areas are being gradually demolished and replaced by modern mass-housing compounds. Moreover, large scale gentrification and urban renewal projects have been taking place, such as the one in Tarlabaşı; some of these projects, like the one in Sulukule, have faced criticism. The Turkish government also has ambitious plans for an expansion of the city west and northwards on the European side in conjunction with the new Istanbul Airport, opened in 2019; the new parts of the city will include four different settlements with specified urban functions, housing 1.5 million people.

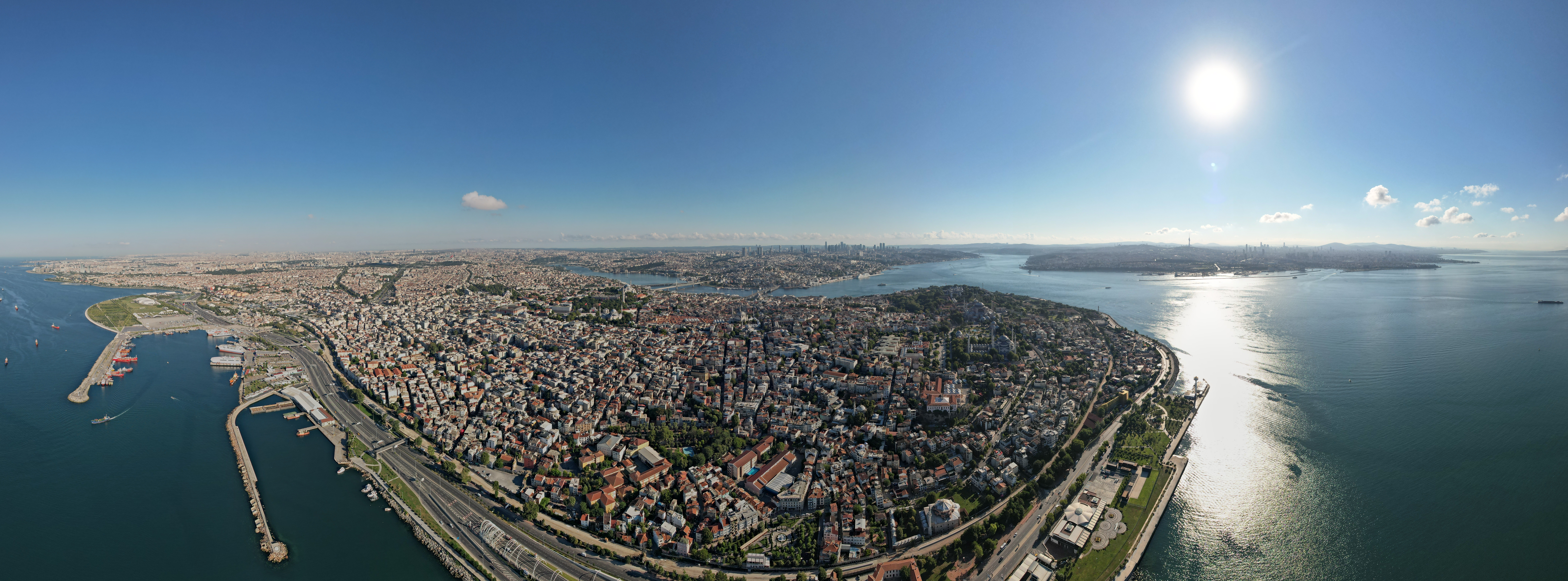
Panoramic view of Istanbul from the south of the historical peninsula and above the Sea of Marmara. The Golden Horn and the Bosporus strait are visible in the background. Business districts can also be seen, such as Levent, Şişli and Maslak on the European side (near the center of the image), and Ataşehir on the Asian side (at right).

=== Parks ===
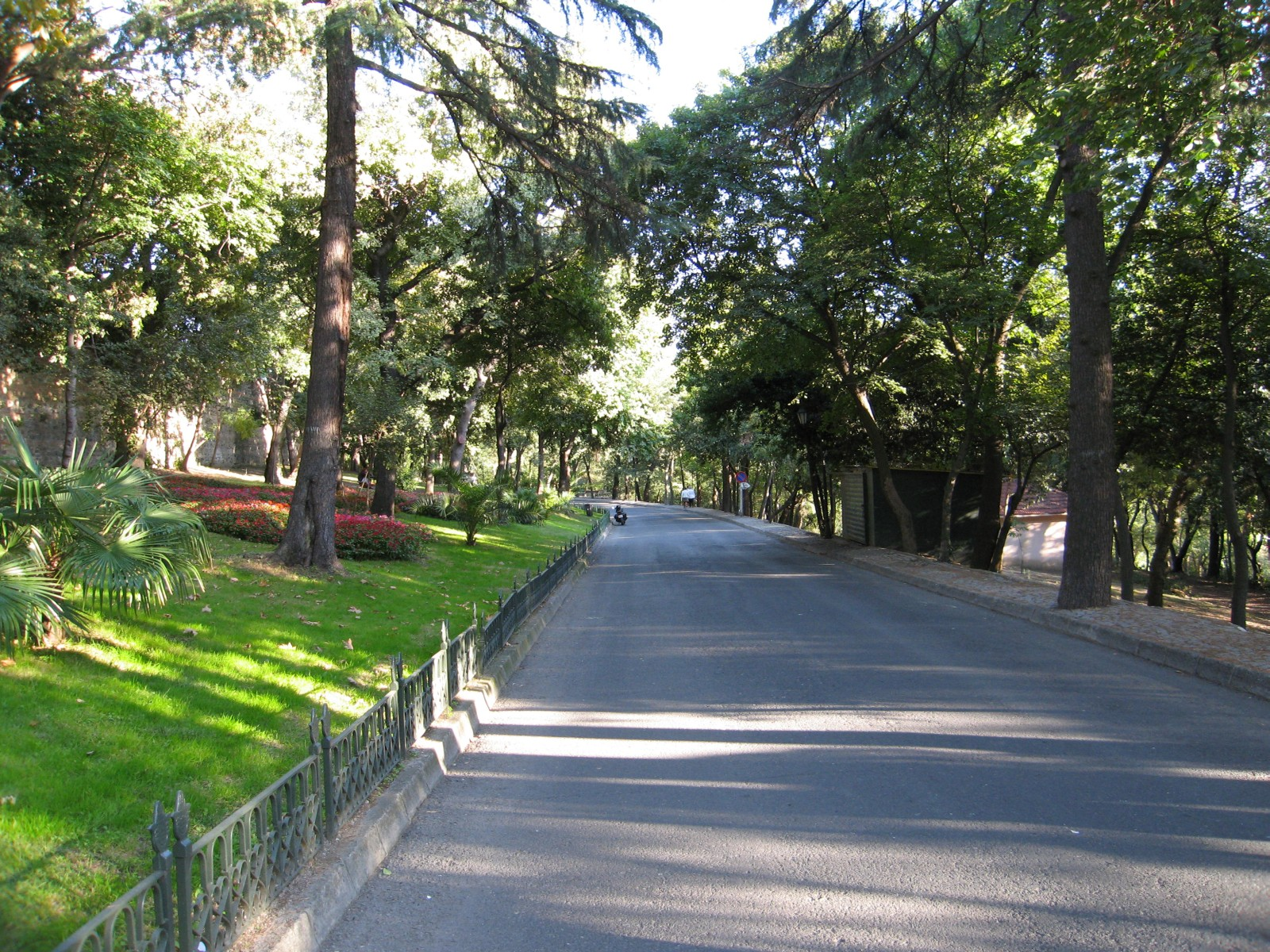
Yıldız Park connects Yıldız Palace to Çırağan Palace

Istanbul does not have a primary urban park, but it has several green areas. Gülhane Park and Yıldız Park were originally included within the grounds of two of Istanbul's palaces – Topkapı Palace and Yıldız Palace – but they were repurposed as public parks in the early decades of the Turkish Republic. Another park, Fethi Paşa Korusu, is on a hillside adjacent to the Bosphorus Bridge in Anatolia, opposite Yıldız Palace in Europe.

Along the European side, and close to the Fatih Sultan Mehmet Bridge, is Emirgan Park, which was known as the Kyparades ('Cypress Forest') during the Byzantine period. In the Ottoman period, it was first granted to Nişancı Feridun Ahmed Bey in the 16th century, before being granted by Sultan Murad IV to the Safavid emir Gûne Han in the 17th century, hence the name Emirgan. The 47-hectare (120-acre) park was later owned by Khedive Isma'il Pasha of Ottoman Egypt in the 19th century. Emirgan Park is known for its diversity of plants and an annual tulip festival is held there since 2005.

The AKP government's decision to replace Taksim Gezi Park with a replica of the Ottoman era Taksim Military Barracks (which was transformed into the Taksim Stadium in 1921, before being demolished in 1940 for building Gezi Park) sparked a series of nationwide protests in 2013 covering a wide range of issues.

Popular during the summer among Istanbulites is Belgrad Forest, spreading across 5,500 hectares (14,000 acres) at the northern edge of the city. The forest originally supplied water to the city and remnants of reservoirs used during Byzantine and Ottoman times survive.

=== Architecture ===
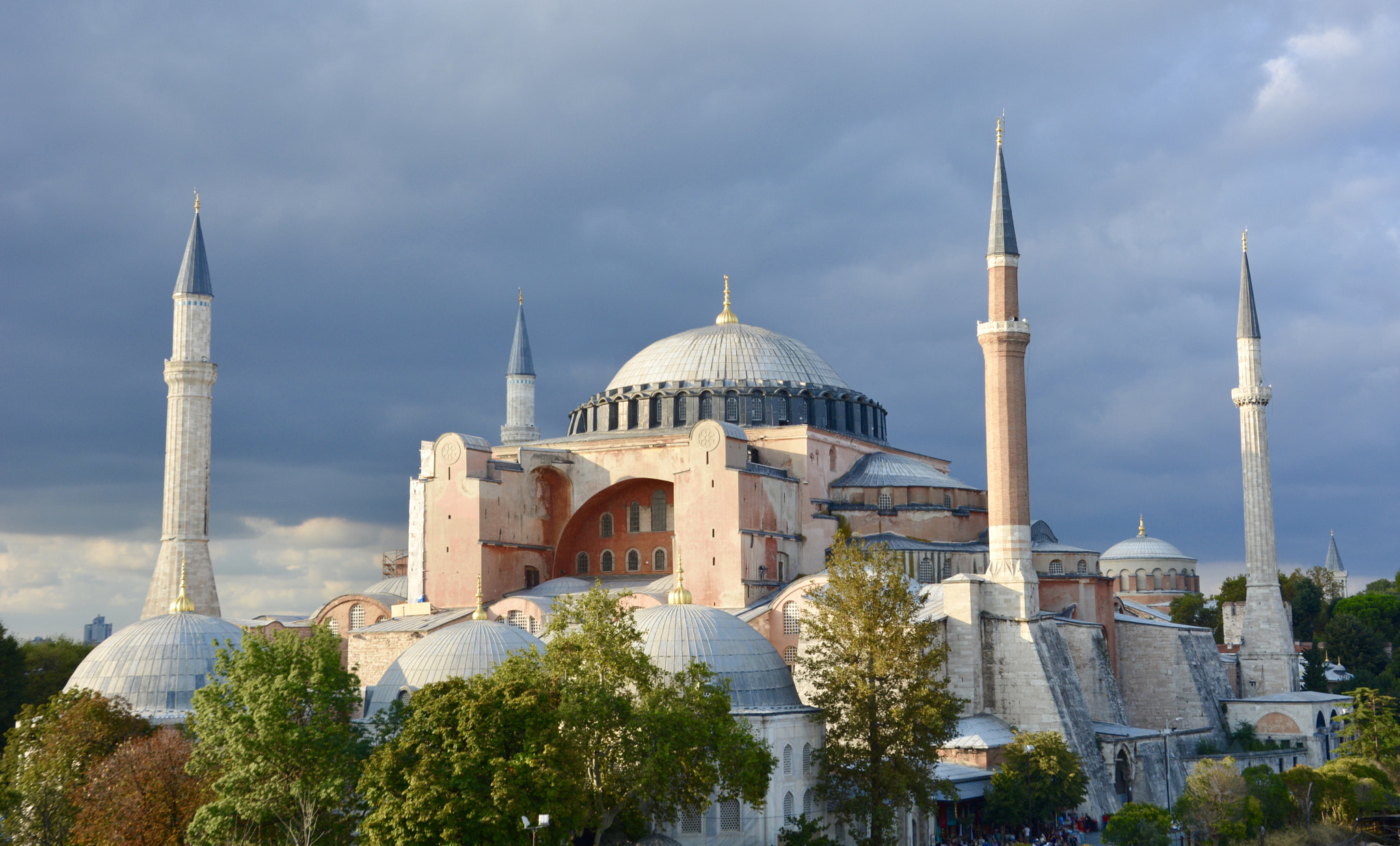
The Hagia Sophia was built by Justinian in the 6th century

Istanbul is primarily known for its Byzantine and Ottoman architecture, but its buildings reflect the various peoples and empires that have previously ruled the city. Examples of Genoese and Roman architecture remain visible in Istanbul alongside their Ottoman counterparts. While nothing of the architecture of the classical Greek period has survived, Roman architecture has proved to be more durable. Obelisks from the Hippodrome of Constantinople are still visible in Sultanahmet Square, while a section of the Valens Aqueduct, constructed in the late 4th century, stands relatively intact at the western edge of the Fatih district. The Column of Constantine, erected in 330 AD to mark the new Roman capital, still stands not far from the Hippodrome.

Early Byzantine architecture followed the classical Roman model of domes and arches, but improved upon these elements, as in the Church of the Saints Sergius and Bacchus. The oldest surviving Byzantine church in Istanbul – albeit in ruins – is the Monastery of Stoudios (later converted into the Imrahor Mosque), which was built in 454. After the recapture of Constantinople in 1261, the Byzantines enlarged two of the most important churches still extant, Chora Church and Pammakaristos Church. Still, the pinnacle of Byzantine architecture, and one of Istanbul's most iconic structures, is the Hagia Sophia. Topped by a dome 31 meters (102 ft) in diameter, the Hagia Sophia stood as the world's largest cathedral for more than a thousand years, before being converted into a mosque and, as it stands now, a museum.

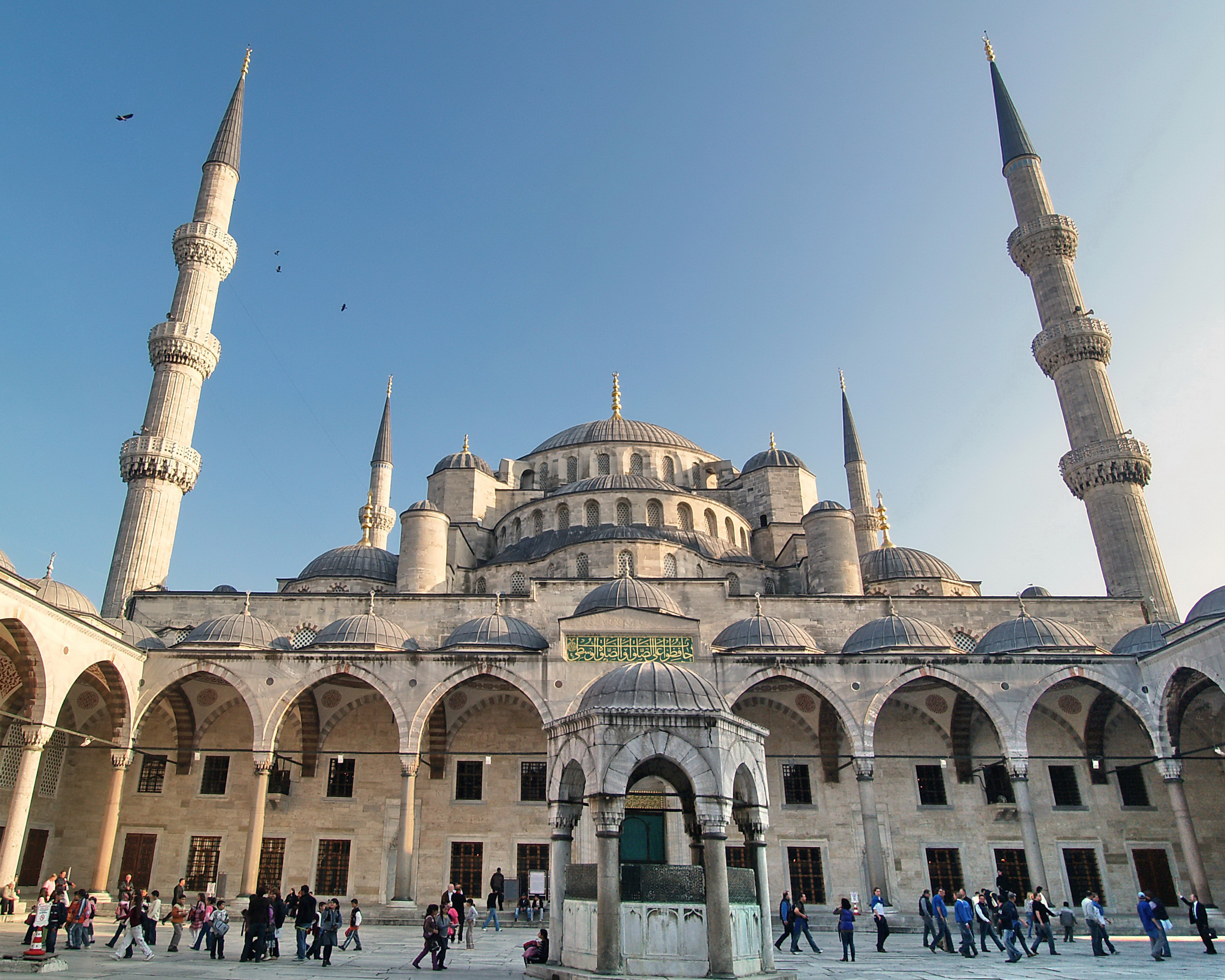
Courtyard of the Blue Mosque

Among the oldest surviving examples of Ottoman architecture in Istanbul are the Anadoluhisarı and Rumelihisarı fortresses, which assisted the Ottomans during their siege of the city. Over the next four centuries, the Ottomans proceeded to make an indelible impression on the skyline of Istanbul, building towering mosques and ornate palaces. The largest palace, Topkapı, includes a diverse array of architectural styles, from Baroque inside the Harem, to its Neoclassical Enderûn Library. The imperial mosques include Sultan Ahmed Mosque (the Blue Mosque), Süleymaniye Mosque, and Yeni Mosque, all of which were built at the peak of the Ottoman Empire, in the 16th and 17th centuries. In the following centuries, and especially after the Tanzimat reforms, Ottoman architecture was supplanted by European styles. Areas around İstiklal Avenue were filled with grand European embassies and rows of buildings in Neoclassical and Renaissance Revival styles, which went on to influence the architecture of a variety of structures in Beyoğlu – including churches, stores, and theaters – and official buildings such as Dolmabahçe Palace.

== Government and politics ==
=== Istanbul Metropolitan Municipality ===
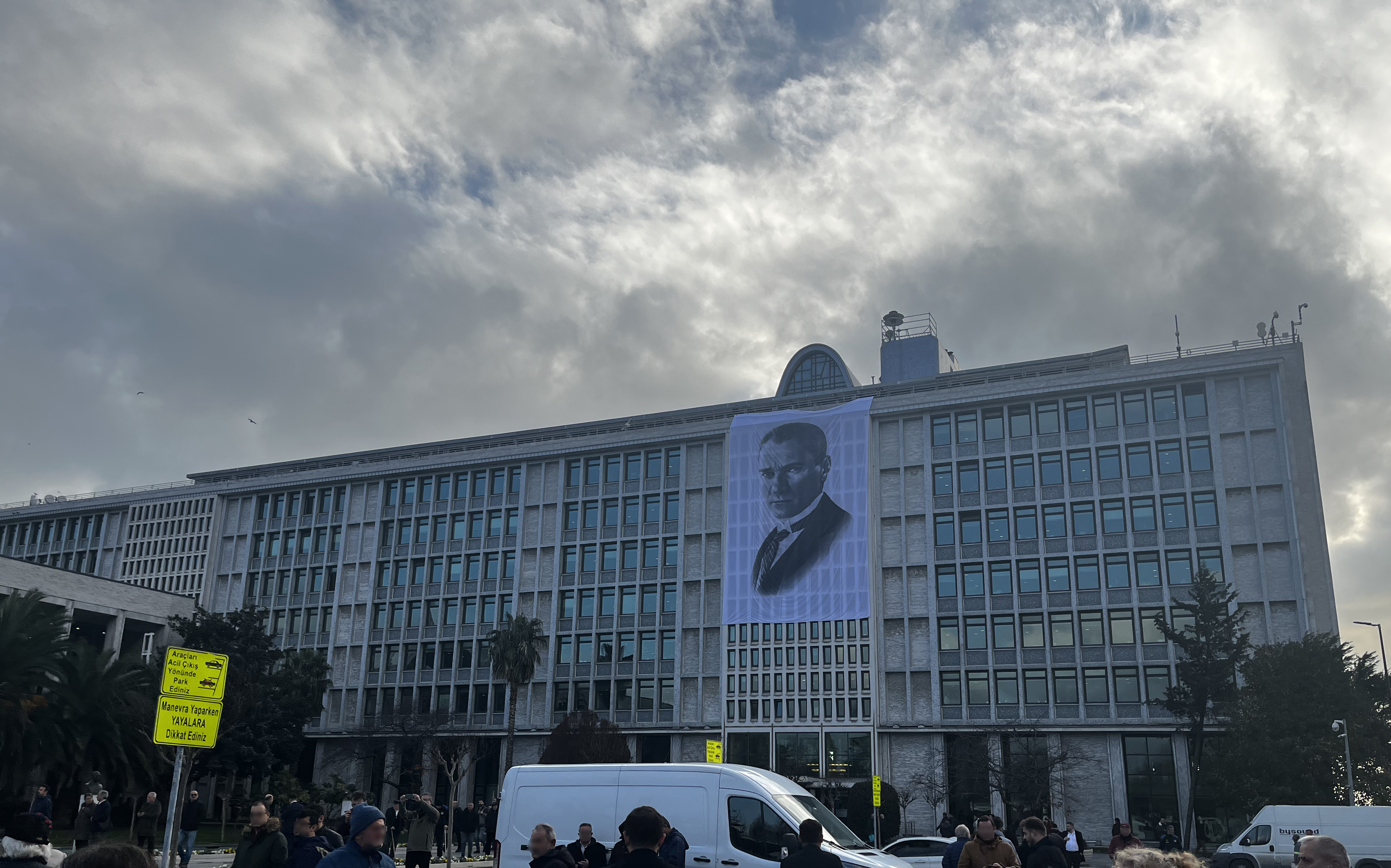
Istanbul Municipal Palace

Established in 1930 and restructured with the Metropolitan Municipalities Law of 2004, the Istanbul Metropolitan Municipality (Turkish: İstanbul Büyükşehir Belediyesi) is the main citywide local government authority responsible for public works, water infrastructure, transportation, cultural services, and such. It is a remarkable employer in Turkey with an accumulated amount of over 80,000 personnel.

The current city structure traces back to the Tanzimat reforms of the 19th century. Prior to that, local administration was held by Qadis, who were appointed by the Grand Vizier. Some religious cults and guilds also provided services for their communities. The Industrial Revolution, though Ottomans were not affected in a great extent, caused influx by foreign merchants as Constantinople was laid between two continents, and the imperial government signed bilateral trade agreements with many European countries, increasing the trade volume, especially with Eastern Mediterranean ports, such as Smyrna, Thessaloniki, Alexandria, and Beirut.

In 1854, during the Crimean War, intensfying ties between the Ottoman Empire and other European powers has brought the reformizing Ottoman bureaucracy into implementing local government authority for Constantinople. The first local government authority, Şehremaneti, was inspired from the French commune system. Laws enacted after the Ottoman constitution of 1876 aimed to expand this structure across the city, imitating the twenty arrondissements of Paris, but they were not fully implemented until 1908 when the city was declared a province with nine constituent districts. Though Şehremaneti and its successors were disbanded by the Turkish Revolution, the system itself continued with the establishment of Istanbul Municipality in 1930.

The Municipal Council of Istanbul is the legislative organ of the Istanbul Metropolitan Municipality. Every five years, 314 local councillors are elected by popular vote. The council is the sole authority in matters regarding the municipality's jurisdiction, with an exception, UKOME (Transportation Coordination Center), which is partnered with central government agencies.

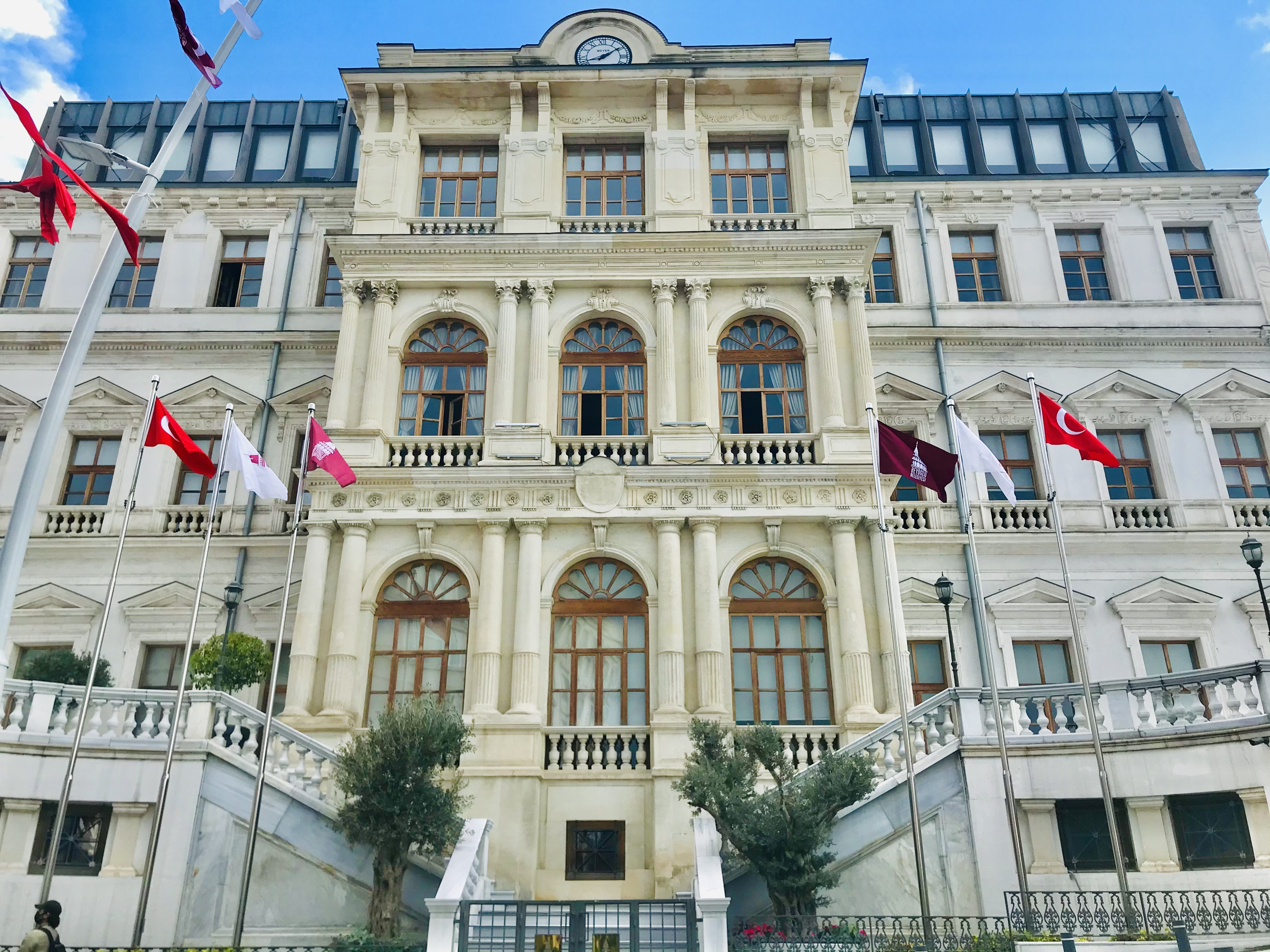
Beyoğlu City Hall

=== District municipalities ===
District municipalities are chiefly responsible for waste management and construction projects within their respective districts, yet the law allows basically all services but critical infrastructure, such as public transportation and water management. They are independent from the Istanbul Metropolitan Municipality and have their own budgets and structure with administrative autonomy to some extent. District municipalities and the metropolitan municipality often collaborate for local projects.

Muhtar is the lowest-tier elected official in Turkey. Each neighborhood has a Muhtar, tasked with helping citizens in regards of bureaucracy and building a bridge between locals and the central government. They report to the civil administration and are the first authority to represent neighborhoods in public policy process.

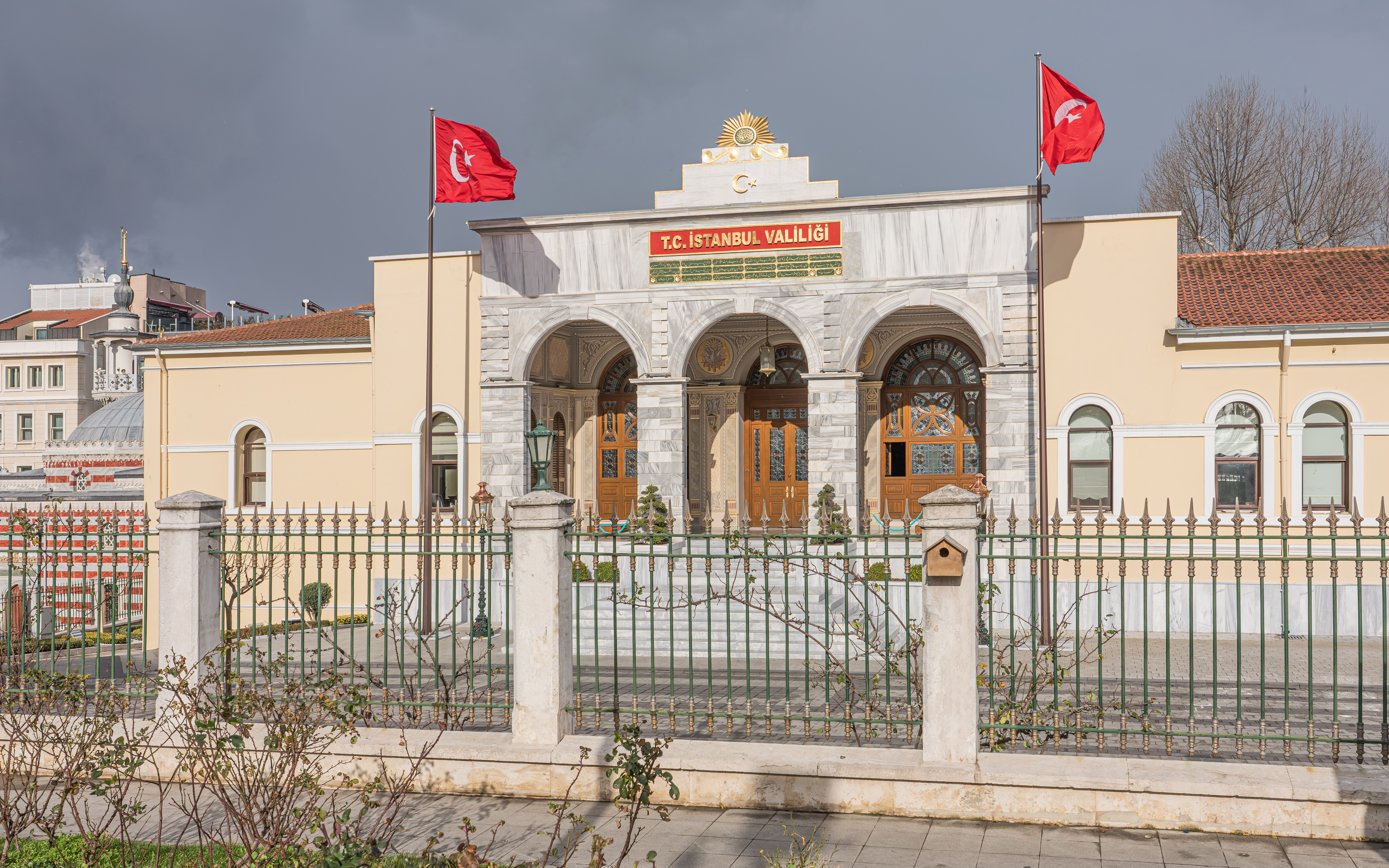
Istanbul Governor's Office, Fatih

=== Civil administration ===
In Turkey, civil administration (Turkish: Mülki idare) refers to appointed officials of the central government to provinces and districts. They handle local affairs of national agencies, such as the General Directorate of Security. Law enforcement in Turkey is mostly centralized, and thus Istanbul does not have a separated armed police force. Vali and their organization are responsible for coordinating public safety efforts throughout a province.

Kaymakam is a representative of the central government in a district. Their nature of duties is similar to a Vali, yet they also handle bureaucratic works regarding the central government organizations in their respective districts. For instance, Kaymakam may audit a school operated by the Ministry of National Education.

=== Politics ===
Politically, Istanbul is seen as the most important administrative region in Turkey. In the run-up to local elections in 2019, Erdoğan claimed 'if we fail in Istanbul, we will fail in Turkey'. The contest in Istanbul carried deep political, economic and symbolic significance for Erdoğan, whose election of mayor of Istanbul in 1994 had served as his launchpad. For Ekrem İmamoğlu, winning the mayoralty of Istanbul was a huge moral victory, but for Erdoğan it had practical ramifications: His party, AKP, lost control of the $4.8 billion municipal budget, which had sustained patronage at the point of delivery of many public services for 25 years.

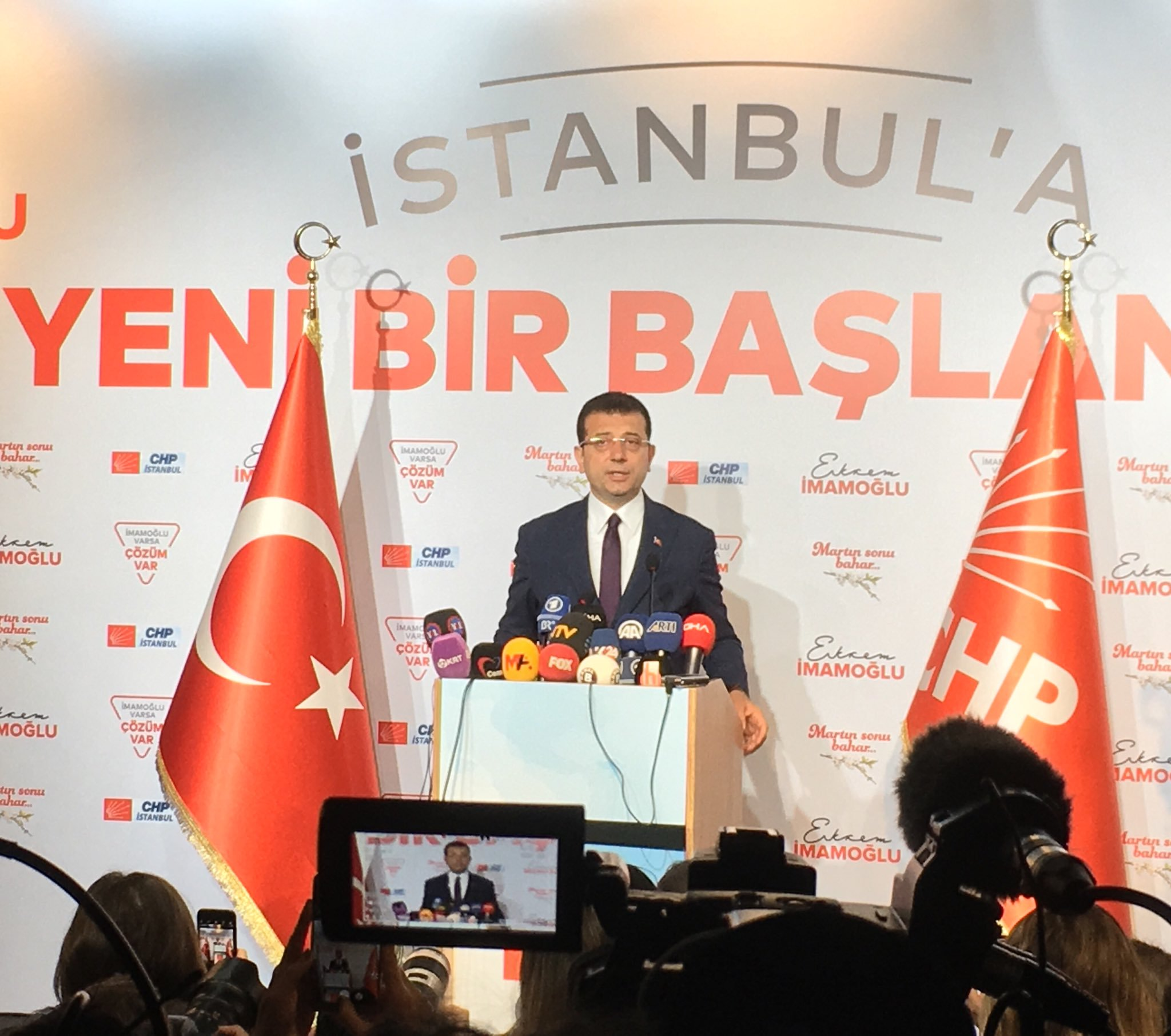
Ekrem İmamoğlu of the Republican People's Party is the 32nd and current Mayor of Istanbul, first elected in 2019 and re-elected in 2024

More recently, Istanbul and many of Turkey's metropolitan cities are following a trend away from the government and their right-wing ideology. In 2013 and 2014, large scale anti-AKP government protests began in İstanbul and spread throughout the nation. This trend first became evident electorally in the 2014 mayoral election where the center-left opposition candidate won an impressive 40% of the vote, despite not winning. The first government defeat in Istanbul occurred in the 2017 constitutional referendum, where Istanbul voted 'No' by 51.4% to 48.6%. The AKP government had supported a 'Yes' vote and won the vote nationally due to high support in rural parts of the country. A major turning point for the government came in the 2019 local elections, where their candidate for Mayor, former Prime Minister Binali Yıldırım, was defeated by a very narrow margin by the Republican People's Party candidate Ekrem İmamoğlu. İmamoğlu won the vote with 48.77% of the vote, against Yıldırım's 48.61%, but the elections were controversially annulled by the Supreme Electoral Council due to AKP's claim of electoral fraud. In the re-run İmamoğlu gathered 54.22% of the total vote and widened his margin of victory.

Following the 2019 election, a trend towards the CHP has persisted across the city. In the 2023 presidential election the CHP candidate, Kemal Kılıçdaroğlu, received 48.56% of the city's vote, while the incumbent president and AKP candidate, Recep Tayyip Erdoğan, received 46.68%.

In the 2024 local elections, Ekrem İmamoğlu was re-elected by a 12-point margin. İmamoğlu won 51.15% of the vote, while the AKP's candidate Murat Kurum received 39.59%. Additionally, the CHP won the mayoralties in 26 of İstanbul's 39 districts.

Administratively, Istanbul is divided into 39 districts, more than any other province in Turkey. Istanbul Province sends 98 Members of Parliament to the Grand National Assembly of Turkey, which has a total of 600 seats. For the purpose of parliamentary elections, Istanbul is divided into three electoral districts; two on the European side and one on the Asian side, electing 28, 35 and 35 MPs respectively.

== Demographics ==
Istanbul population pyramid in 2022

Historical populations

Pre-Republic
Year	Pop.
100	36,000
361	300,000
500	400,000
7th c.	150–350,000
8th c.	125–500,000
9th c.	50–250,000
1000	150–300,000
1100	200,000
1200	150,000
1261	100,000
1350	80,000
1453	45,000
1500	200,000
1550	660,000
1700	700,000
1815	500,000
1860	715,000
1890	874,000
1900	942,900

Historical population in the Republic

Historical population

Year	Pop.	±% p.a.
1925	881,000	—
1927	691,000	−11.44%
1935	740,800	+0.87%
1940	793,900	+1.39%
1945	845,300	+1.26%
1950	983,000	+3.06%
1960	1,459,500	+4.03%
1965	1,743,000	+3.61%
1970	2,132,400	+4.12%
1975	2,547,400	+3.62%
1980	2,853,500	+2.30%

Year	Pop.	±% p.a.
1985	5,494,900	+14.00%
1990	6,620,200	+3.80%
1994	7,615,500	+3.56%
1997	8,260,400	+2.75%
2000	8,831,800	+2.25%
2007	11,174,200	+3.42%
2009	12,611,910	+6.24%
2013	13,679,489	+2.05%
2017	14,475,056	+1.42%
2022	15,244,936	+1.04%

Sources: Jan Lahmeyer 2004, Chandler 1987, Morris 2010,Turan 2010
Pre-Republic figures estimated

Throughout most of its history, Istanbul has ranked among the largest cities in the world. By 500 CE, Constantinople had somewhere between 400,000 and 500,000 people, edging out its predecessor, Rome, for the world's largest city. Constantinople jostled with other major historical cities, such as Baghdad, Chang'an, Kaifeng and Merv for the position of the world's largest city until the 12th century. It never returned to being the world's largest, but remained the largest city in Europe from 1500 to 1750, when it was surpassed by London.

The Turkish Statistical Institute estimates that the population of Istanbul Metropolitan Municipality was 15,519,267 at the end of 2019, hosting 19% of the country's population. 64.4% of the residents live on the European side and 35.6% on the Asian side.

Istanbul ranks as the seventh-largest city proper in the world, and the second-largest urban agglomeration in Europe, after Moscow. The city's annual population growth of 1.5% ranks as one of the highest among the seventy-eight largest metropolises in the Organisation for Economic Co-operation and Development. The high population growth mirrors an urbanization trend across the country, as the second and third fastest-growing OECD metropolises are the Turkish cities of İzmir and Ankara.

Istanbul experienced especially rapid growth during the second half of the 20th century, with its population increasing tenfold between 1950 and 2000. This growth was fueled by internal and international migration. Istanbul's foreign population with a residence permit increased dramatically, from 43,000 in 2007 to 856,377 in 2019.

According to 2020 TÜİK data, about 2.1 million people in a population of over 15.4 million have been registered (Note: Based on state register data, which is unchangeable and inherited from the family. A married women is also registered to her husband's province.) in Istanbul, meanwhile the vast majority of the residents ultimately originate from Anatolian provinces, especially those in the Black Sea, Central and Eastern Anatolia regions due to internal migration since the 1950s. People registered in Kastamonu, Ordu, Giresun, Erzurum, Samsun, Malatya, Trabzon, Sinop and Rize provinces represent the biggest population groups in Istanbul, meanwhile people registered in Sivas has the highest percentage with more than 760 thousand residents in the city. A 2019 survey found that only 36% of the Istanbul's population was born in the province.

=== Ethnic and religious groups ===
Ethnic groups among Turkish citizens in Istanbul (2019 KONDA survey)
Turks	78%
Kurds	17%
Zazas	1%
Arabs	1%
Others	3%

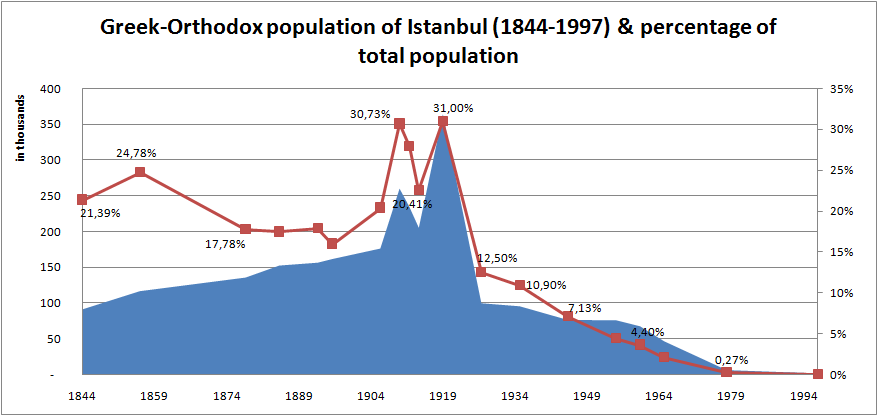
Greek population in Istanbul (1844-1997), it collapses after the Greek genocide.

Istanbul has been a cosmopolitan city throughout much of its history, but it has become more homogenized since the end of the Ottoman era. The dominant ethnic group in the city is Turkish people, which also forms the majority group in Turkey. According to survey data 78% of the voting-age Turkish citizens in Istanbul state "Turkish" as their ethnic identity.

With estimates ranging from 2 to 4 million, Kurds form one of the largest ethnic minorities in Istanbul and are the biggest group after Turks among Turkish citizens. According to a 2019 KONDA study, Kurds constituted about 17% of Istanbul's adult total population who were Turkish citizens. Although the initial Kurdish presence in the city dates back to the early Ottoman period, the majority of Kurds in the city originate from villages in eastern and southeastern Turkey. Zazas are also present in the city and constitute about 1% of the total voting-age population.

Arabs form the city's other largest ethnic minority, with an estimated population of more than 2 million. Following Turkey's support for the Arab Spring, Istanbul emerged as a hub for dissidents from across the Arab world, including former presidential candidates from Egypt, Kuwaiti MPs, and former ministers from Jordan, Saudi Arabia (including Jamal Khashoggi), Syria, and Yemen. As of August 2019, the number of refugees of the Syrian Civil War in Turkey residing in Istanbul was estimated to be about 1 million. Native Arab population in Turkey who are Turkish citizens are found to be making up less than 1% of city's total adult population. As of August 2023, there were more than 530,000 refugees of the Syrian civil war in Istanbul, the highest number in any Turkish city.

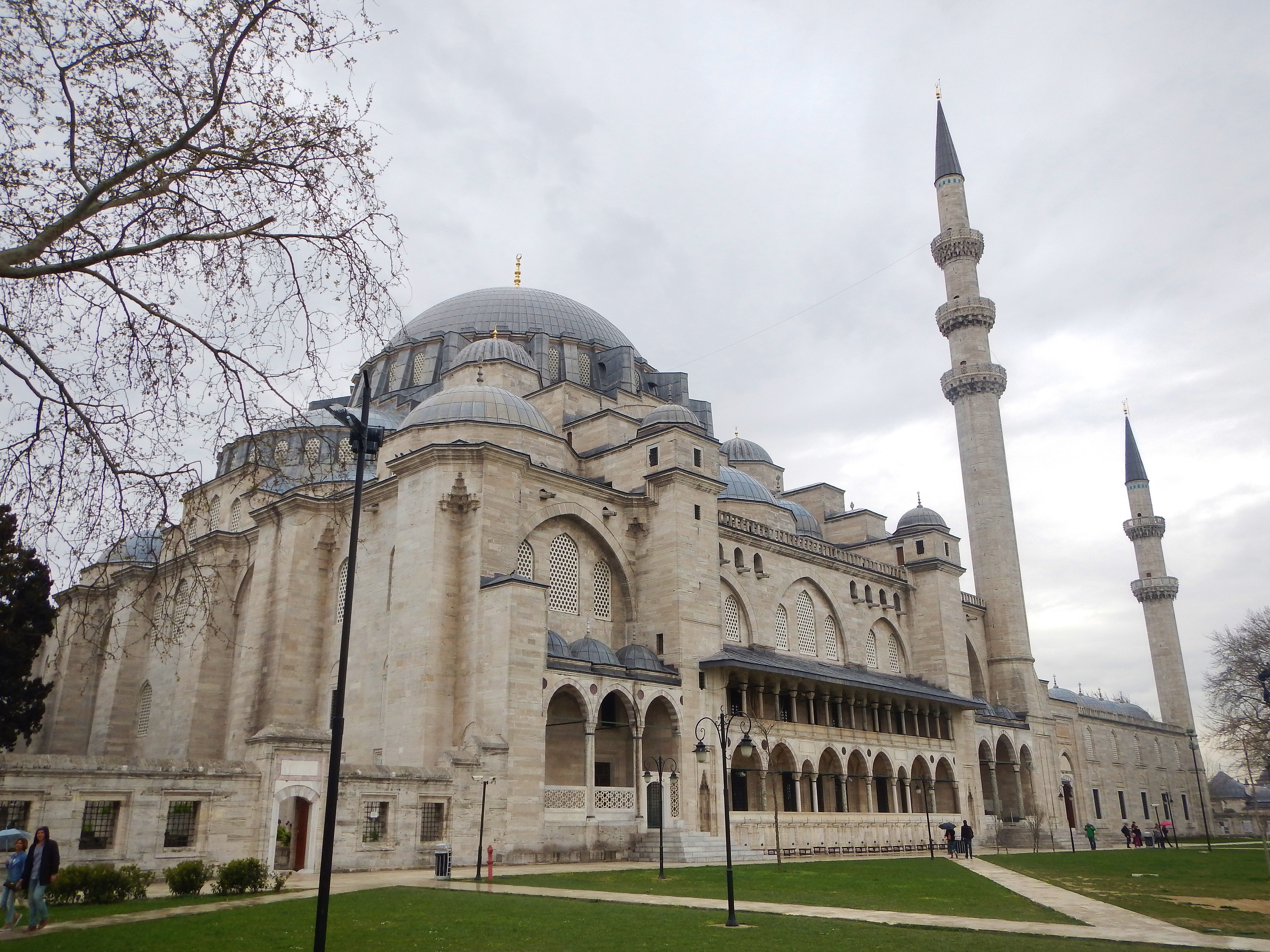
Built by Suleiman the Magnificent, the Süleymaniye Mosque (1550–1557) was designed by his chief architect Mimar Sinan, the most illustrious of all Ottoman architects

A 2019 survey study by KONDA that examined the religiosity of the voting-age adults in Istanbul showed that 57% of the surveyed had a religion and were trying to practise its requirements. This was followed by nonobservant people with 26% who identified with a religion but generally did not practise its requirements. 11% stated they were fully devoted to their religion, meanwhile 6% were non-believers who did not believe the rules and requirements of a religion. 24% of the surveyed also identified themselves as "religious conservatives". About 90% of Istanbul's population are Sunni Muslims and Alevism forms the second biggest religious group.

Into the 19th century, the Christians of Istanbul tended to be either Greek Orthodox, members of the Armenian Apostolic Church or Catholic Levantines. Greeks and Armenians form the largest Christian population in the city. While Istanbul's Greek population was exempted from the 1923 population exchange with Greece, changes in tax status and the 1955 anti-Greek pogrom prompted thousands to leave. Following Greek migration to the city for work in the 2010s, the Greek population rose to nearly 3,000 in 2019, still greatly diminished since 1919, when it stood at 350,000. There are today 50,000 to 70,000 Armenians in Istanbul down from a peak of 164,000 in 1913. As of 2019, an estimated 18,000 of the country's 25,000 Christian Assyrians live in Istanbul.

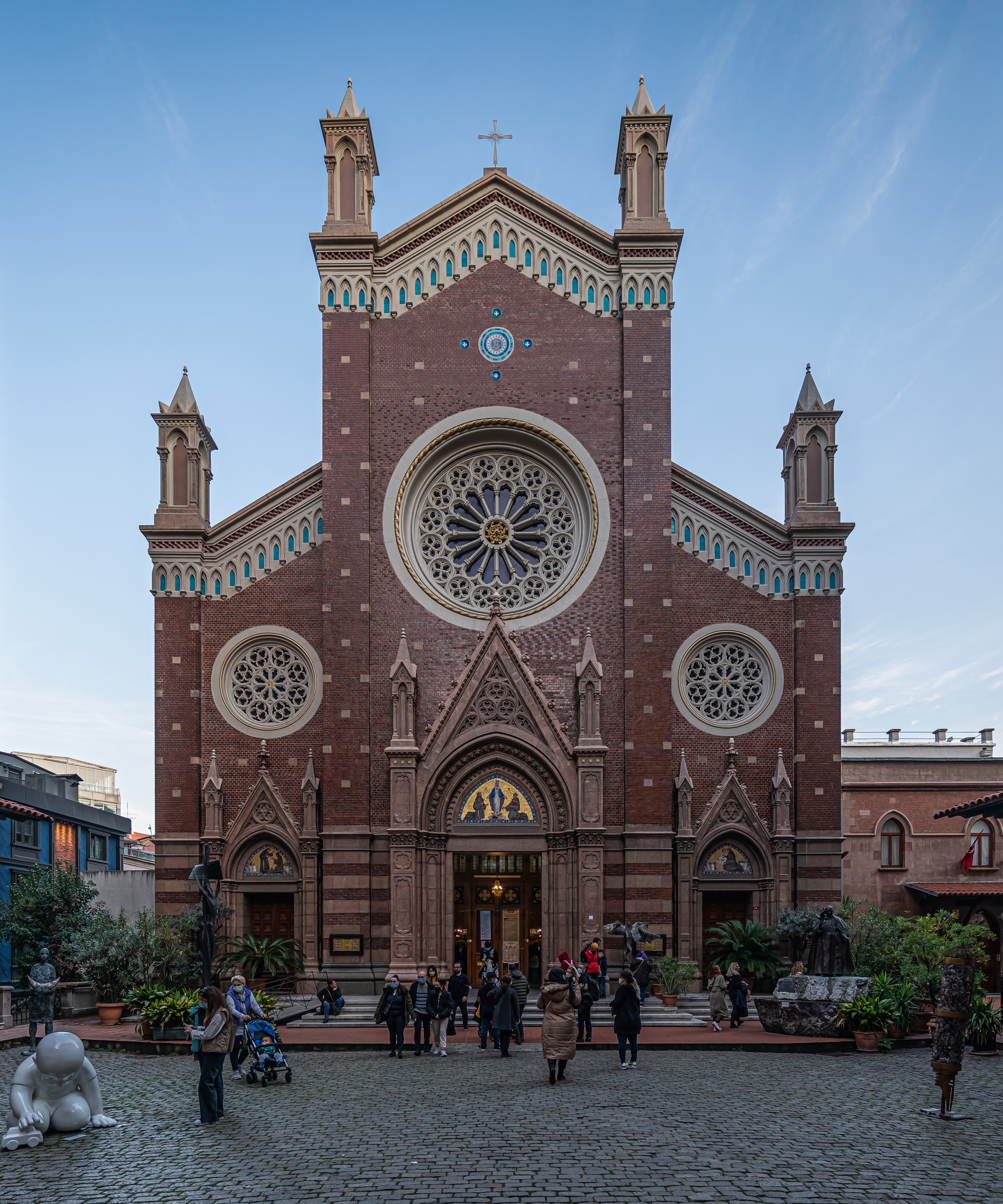
There are 234 active churches and chapels in the city, including the Church of St. Anthony of Padua on İstiklal Avenue in Beyoğlu (Pera)

The majority of the Catholic Levantines (Turkish: Levanten) in Istanbul and İzmir are the descendants of traders/colonists from the Italian maritime republics of the Mediterranean (especially Genoa and Venice) and France, who obtained special rights and privileges called the Capitulations from the Ottoman sultans in the 16th century. The community had more than 15,000 members during Atatürk's presidency in the 1920s and 1930s, but today is reduced to only a few hundred, according to Italo-Levantine writer Giovanni Scognamillo. They continue to live in Istanbul (mostly in Karaköy, Beyoğlu and Nişantaşı), and İzmir (mostly in Karşıyaka, Bornova and Buca).

Istanbul became one of the world's most important Jewish centers in the 16th and 17th century. Romaniote and Ashkenazi communities existed in Istanbul before the conquest of Istanbul, but it was the arrival of Sephardic Jews that ushered a period of cultural flourishing. Sephardic Jews settled in the city after their expulsion from Spain and Portugal in 1492 and 1497. Sympathetic to the plight of Sephardic Jews, Bayezid II sent out the Ottoman Navy under the command of admiral Kemal Reis to Spain in 1492 in order to evacuate them safely to Ottoman lands. In marked contrast to Jews in Europe, Ottoman Jews were allowed to work in any profession. Ottoman Jews in Istanbul excelled in commerce and came to particularly dominate the medical profession. By 1711, using the printing press, books came to be published in Spanish and Ladino, Yiddish, and Hebrew. In large part due to emigration to Israel, the Jewish population in the city dropped from 100,000 in 1950 to 15,000 in 2021.

== Economy ==
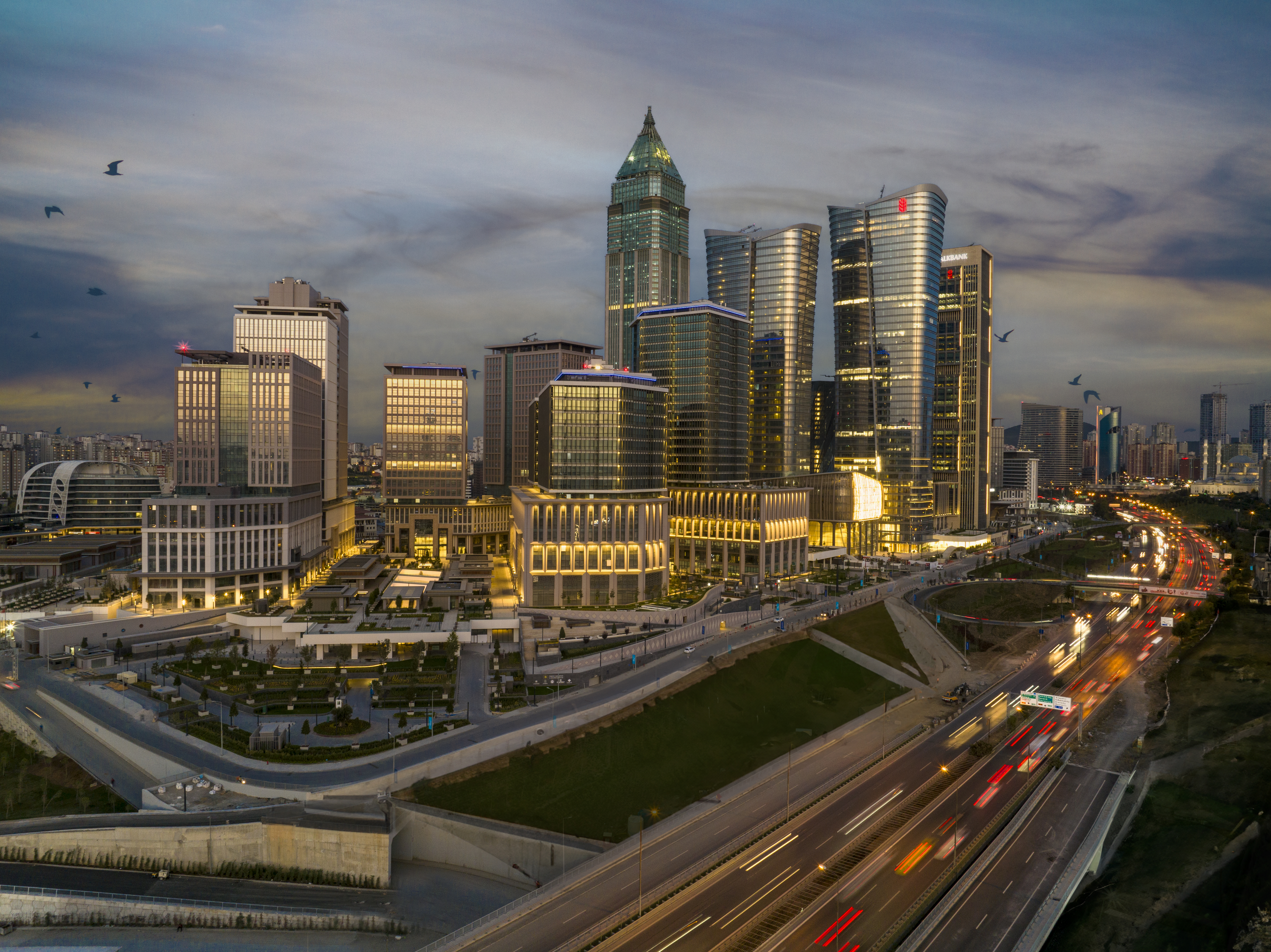
Istanbul Financial Center in the Finanskent quarter near Ataşehir is the main financial district on the Asian side of the city. Levent, Maslak and Şişli are the main financial districts on the European side of Istanbul.

Istanbul had the eleventh-largest economy among the world's urban areas in 2018, and is responsible for 30% of Turkey's industrial output, 31% of GDP, and 47% of tax revenues. The city's gross domestic product adjusted by PPP stood at US$537.507 billion in 2018, with manufacturing and services accounting for 36% and 60% of the economic output respectively. Istanbul's productivity is 110% higher than the national average. Trade is economically important, accounting for 30% of the economic output in the city. In 2019, companies based in Istanbul produced exports worth $83.66 billion and received imports totaling $128.34 billion; these figures were equivalent to 47% and 61%, respectively, of the national totals.

Istanbul, which straddles the Bosporus strait, houses international ports that link Europe and Asia. The Bosporus, providing the only passage from the Black Sea to the Mediterranean, is the world's busiest and narrowest strait used for international navigation, with more than 200 million tons of oil passing through it each year. International conventions guarantee passage between the Black and the Mediterranean seas, even when tankers carry oil, natural gas, chemicals, and other flammable or explosive materials as cargo. In 2011, as a workaround solution, the then Prime Minister Erdoğan presented Canal Istanbul, a project to open a new strait between the Black and Marmara seas. While the project was still on Turkey's agenda in 2020, there has not been a clear date set for it.

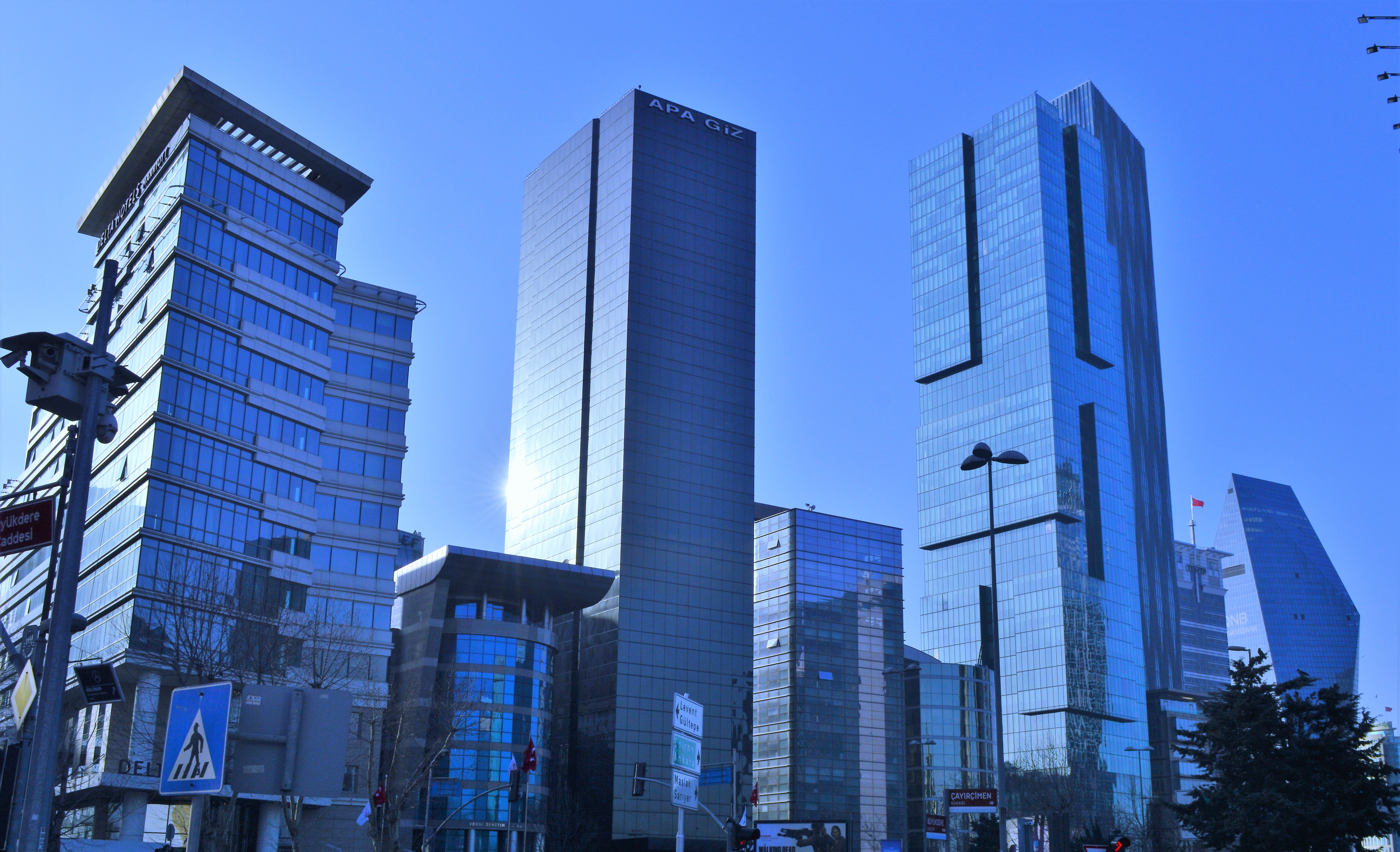
Büyükdere Avenue in Levent

Shipping is a significant part of the city's economy, with 73.9% of exports and 92.7% of imports in 2018 executed by sea. Istanbul has three major shipping ports – the Port of Haydarpaşa, the Port of Ambarlı, and the Port of Zeytinburnu – as well as several smaller ports and oil terminals along the Bosporus and the Sea of Marmara. Haydarpaşa, at the southeastern end of the Bosporus, was Istanbul's largest port until the early 2000s. Since then operations were shifted to Ambarlı, with plans to convert Haydarpaşa into a tourism complex. In 2019, Ambarlı, on the western edge of the urban center, had an annual capacity of 3,104,882 TEUs, making it the third-largest cargo terminal in the Mediterranean basin.

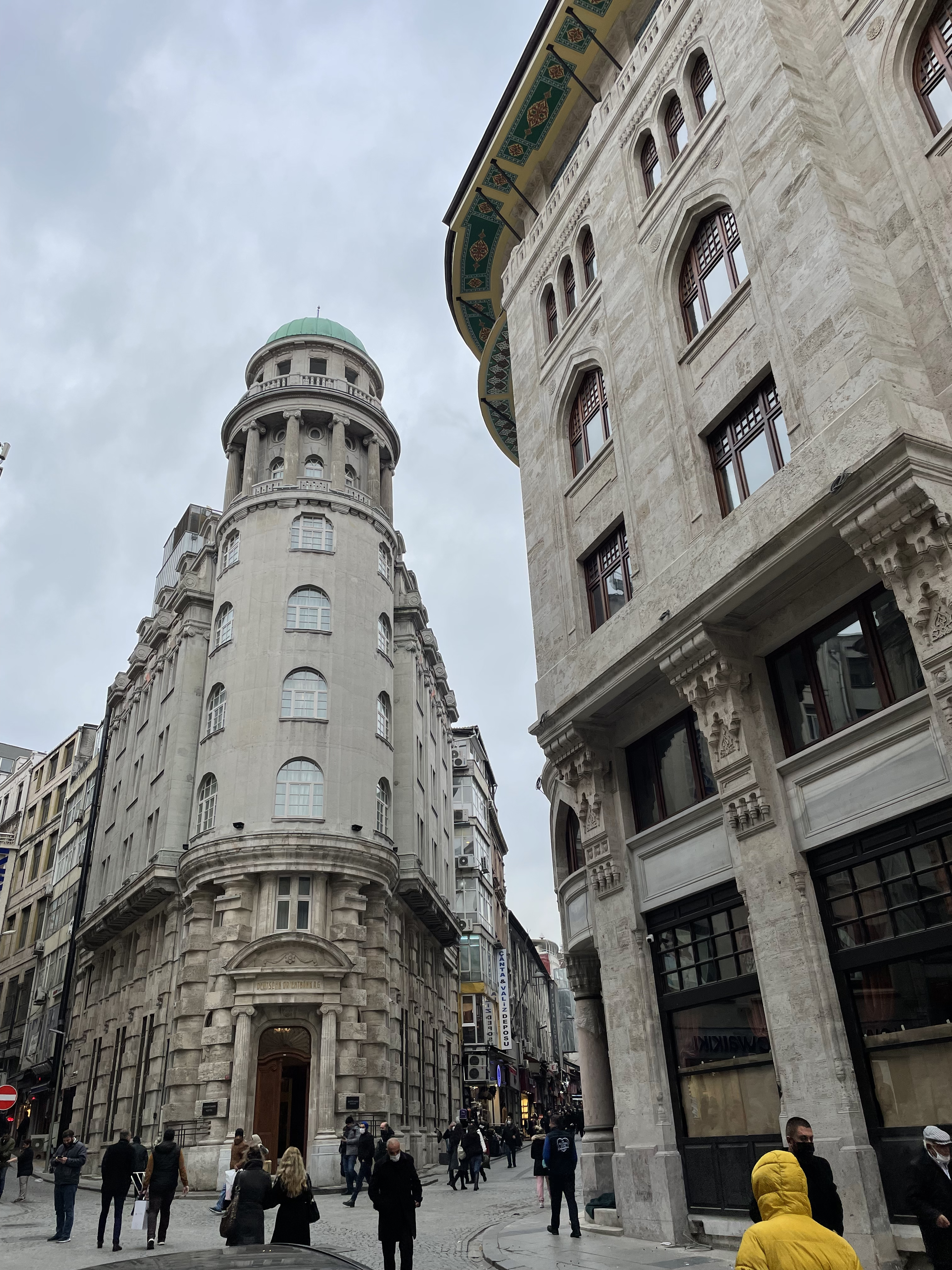
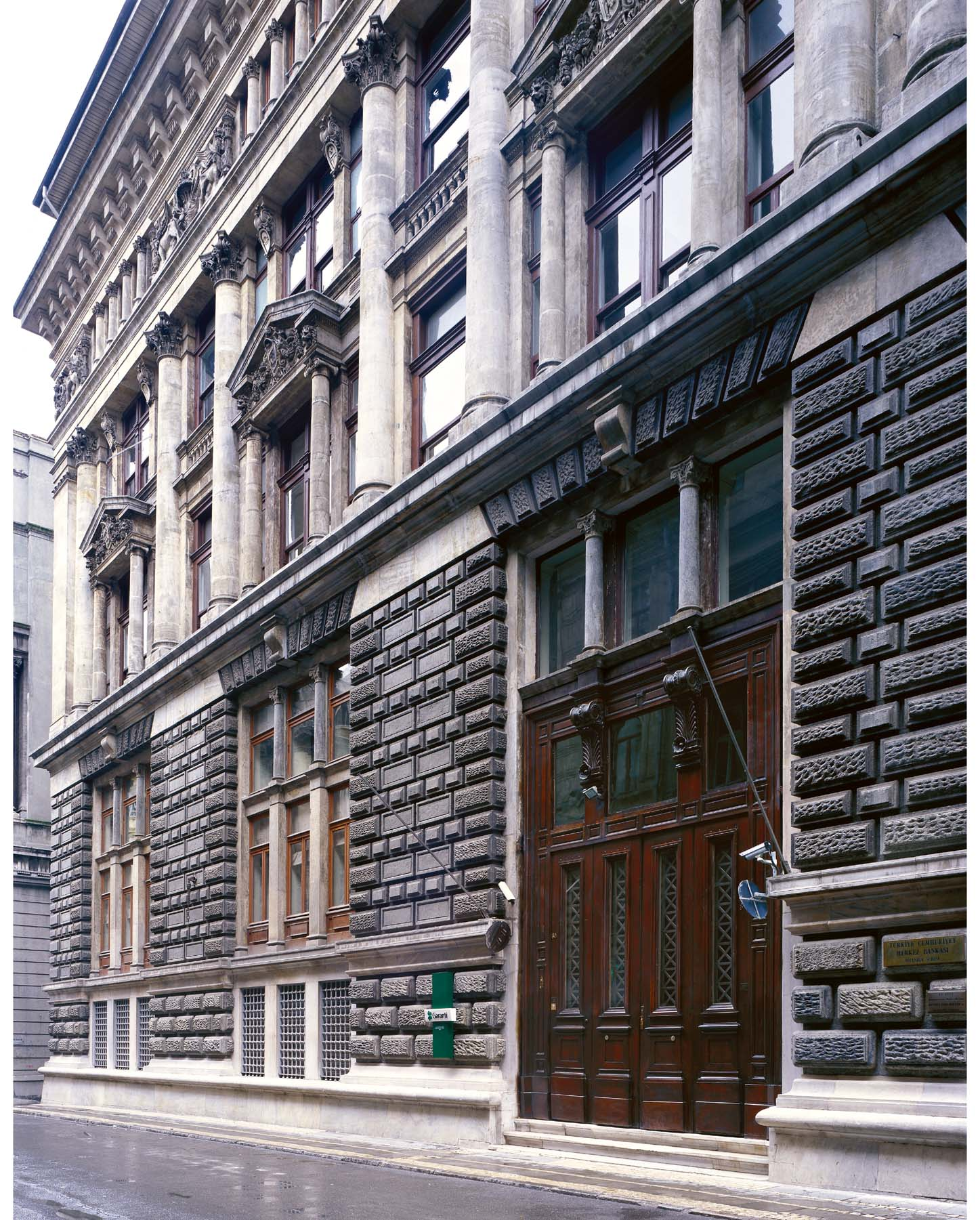
Deutsche Orientbank (1909) in Sirkeci (left) and the Ottoman Bank (1892) on Bankalar Caddesi (right)

Istanbul has been an international banking hub since the 1980s, and is home to the only active stock exchange in Turkey, Borsa Istanbul, which was originally established as the Ottoman Stock Exchange in 1866. In 1995, keeping up with the financial trends, Borsa Istanbul moved its headquarters (which was originally located on Bankalar Caddesi, the financial center of the Ottoman Empire, and later at the 4th Vakıf Han building in Sirkeci) to İstinye, in the vicinity of Maslak, which hosts the headquarters of numerous Turkish banks.

Since 2023, the Ataşehir district on the Asian side of the city is home to the Istanbul Financial Center (IFC), where the new headquarters of the state-owned Turkish banks, including the Turkish Central Bank, are located. As of 2023, the five tallest skyscrapers in Istanbul and Turkey are the 352 m (1,154 ft 10 in) tall CBRT Tower in the Ataşehir district on the Asian side of the city; Metropol Istanbul Tower A (70 floors / 301 metres including its twin spires) also in the Ataşehir district; Skyland Istanbul Towers 1 and 2 (2 × 284 metres) located adjacent to Rams Park in the Huzur neighbourhood of the Sarıyer district on the European side, and Istanbul Sapphire (54 floors / 238 metres; 261 metres including its spire) in Levent on the European side.

13.4 million foreign tourists visited the city in 2018, making Istanbul the world's fifth most-visited city in that year. Istanbul and Antalya are Turkey's two largest international gateways, receiving a quarter of the nation's foreign tourists. Istanbul has more than fifty museums, with the Topkapı Palace, the most visited museum in the city, bringing in more than $30 million in revenue each year. Istanbul expects 1 million tourists from cruise companies after the renovation of its cruise port, also known as Galataport in Karaköy district.

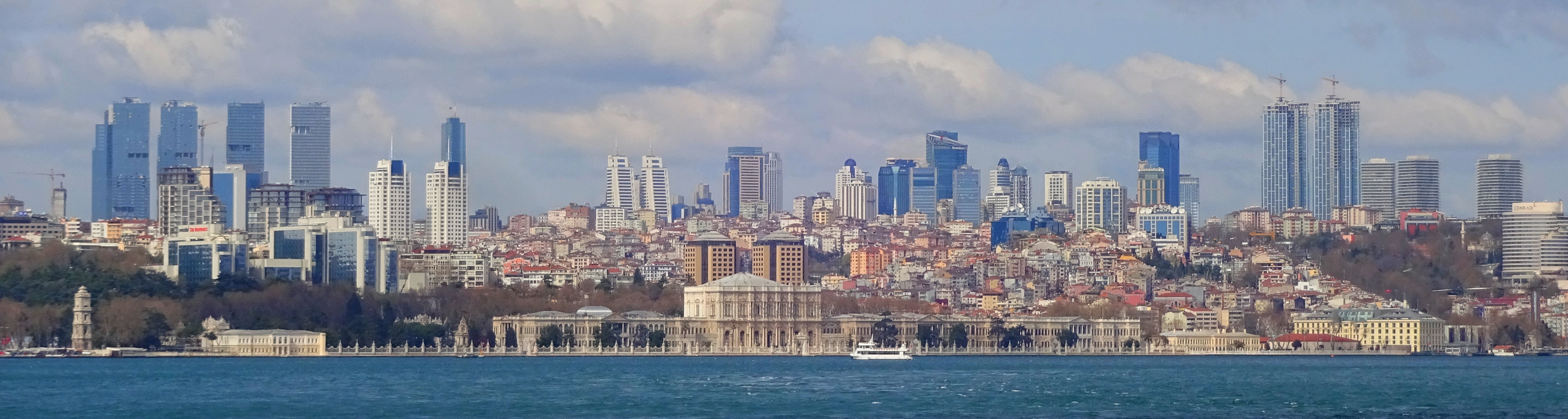
A view of Dolmabahçe Palace and the skyscrapers of Levent financial district in the background. Providing the only sea route to the Black Sea, the Bosporus is the world's busiest waterway that is used for international navigation.

== Culture ==
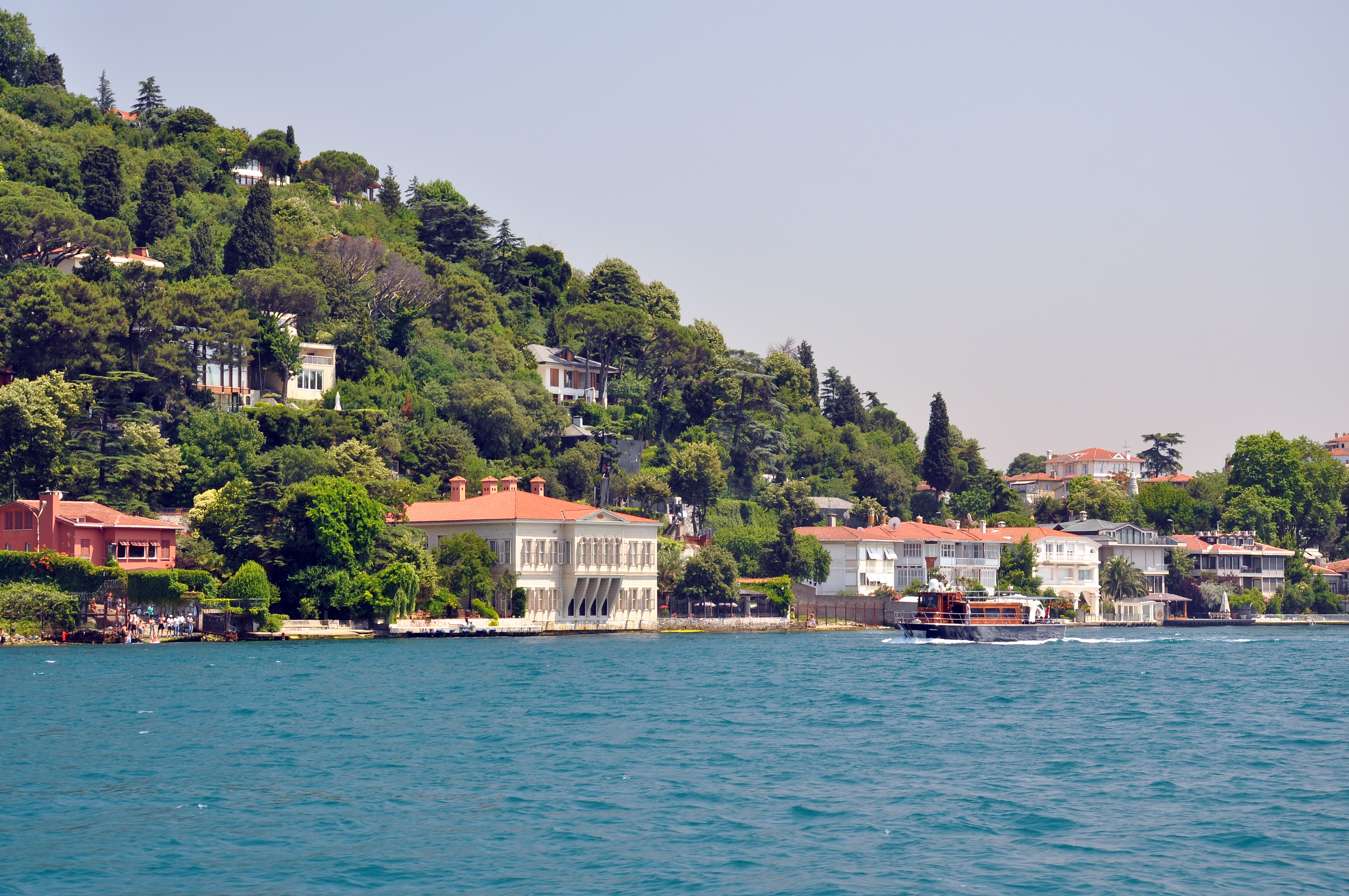
Yalı houses on the Bosporus are among the frequently used settings in Turkish television drama

Istanbul was historically known as a cultural hub, but its cultural scene stagnated after the Turkish Republic shifted its focus toward Ankara. The new national government established programs that served to orient Turks toward musical traditions, especially those originating in Europe, but musical institutions and visits by foreign classical artists were primarily centered in the new capital.

Much of Turkey's cultural scene had its roots in Istanbul, and by the 1980s and 1990s Istanbul reemerged globally as a city whose cultural significance is not solely based on its past glory.

By the end of the 19th century, Istanbul had established itself as a regional artistic center, with Turkish, European, and Middle Eastern artists flocking to the city. Despite efforts to make Ankara Turkey's cultural heart, Istanbul had the country's primary institution of art until the 1970s. When additional universities and art journals were founded in Istanbul during the 1980s, artists formerly based in Ankara moved in.

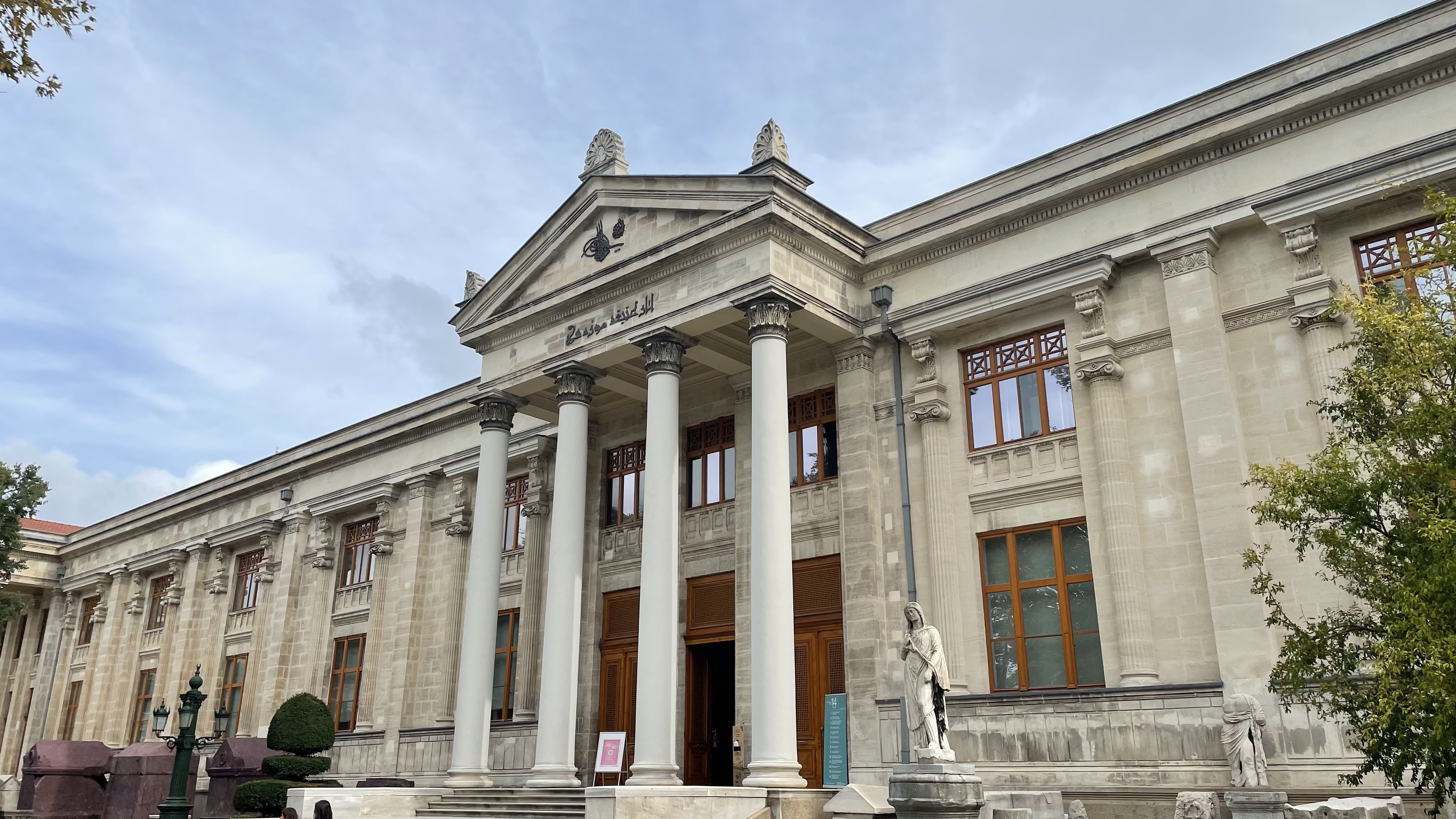
The Istanbul Archaeology Museums, founded by Osman Hamdi Bey in 1891, form Turkey's oldest modern museum

Beyoğlu has been transformed into the artistic center of the city, with young artists and older Turkish artists formerly residing abroad finding footing there. Modern art museums, including İstanbul State Art and Sculpture Museum, National Palaces Painting Museum, İstanbul Modern, the Pera Museum, Sakıp Sabancı Museum, Arter and SantralIstanbul, opened in the 2000s to complement the exhibition spaces and auction houses that have already contributed to the cosmopolitan nature of the city. These museums have yet to attain the popularity of older museums on the historic peninsula, including the Istanbul Archaeology Museums, which ushered in the era of modern museums in Turkey, and the Turkish and Islamic Arts Museum.

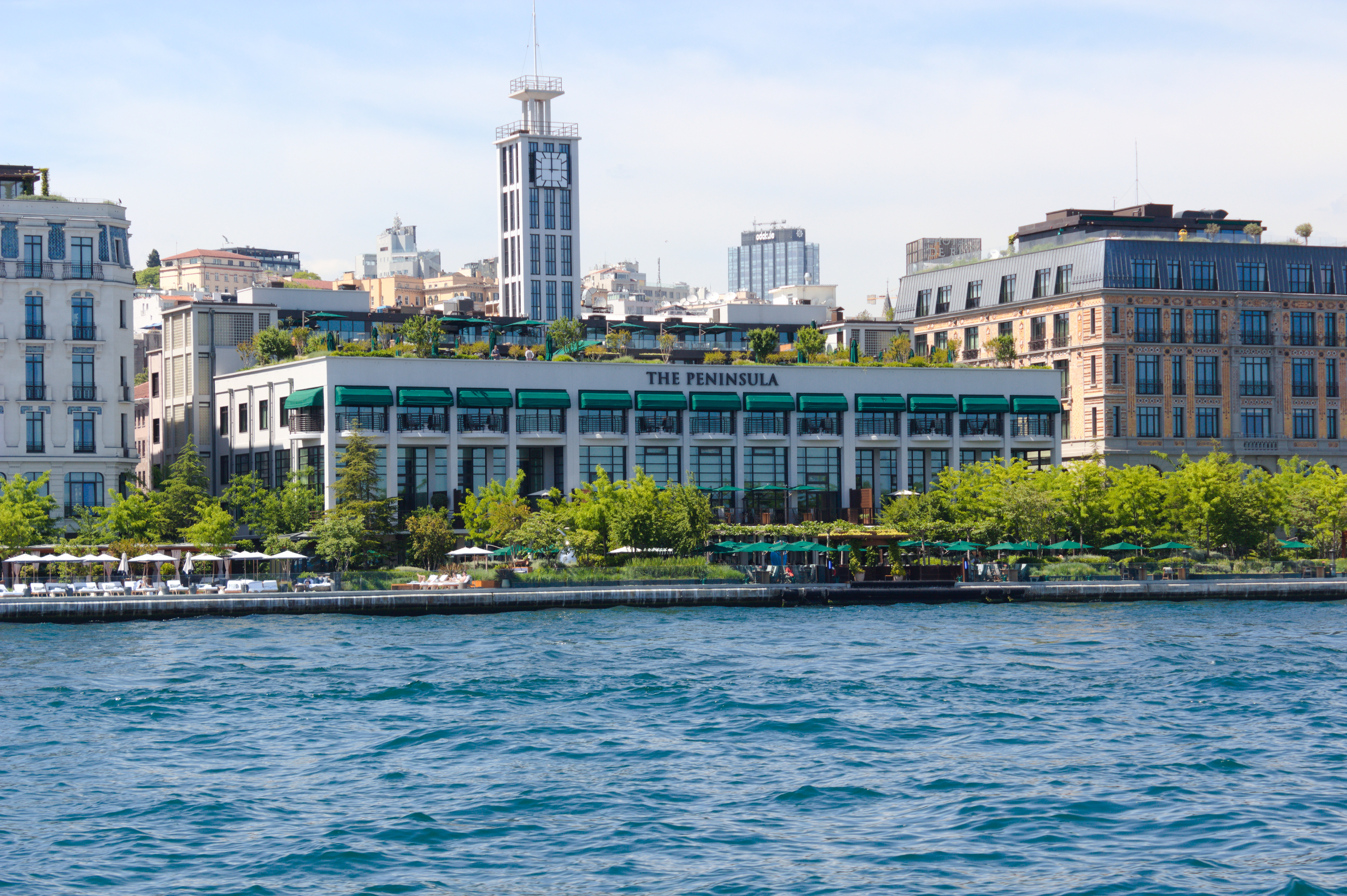
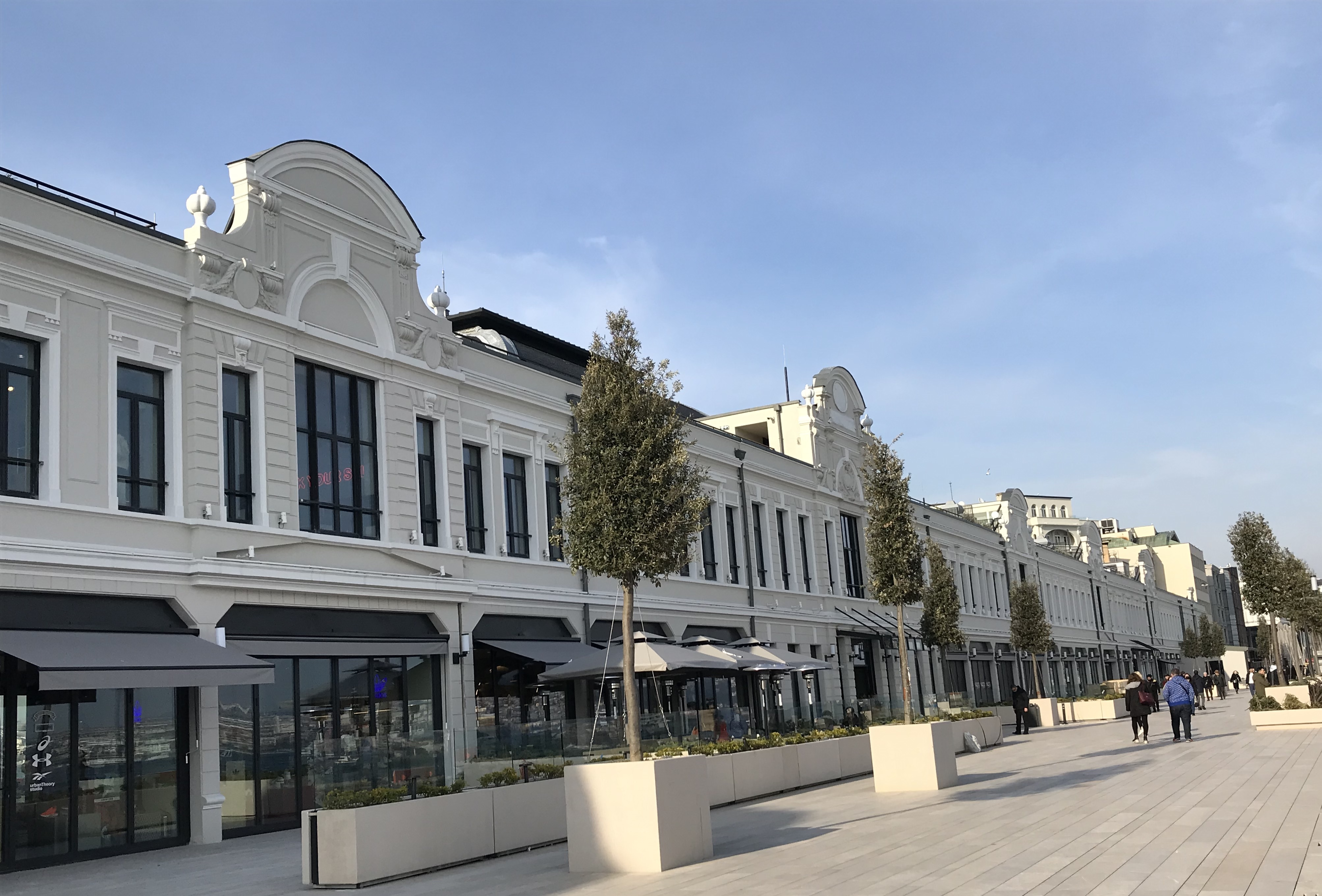
The Peninsula Istanbul (formerly the Karaköy Seaport Passenger Lounge) and the restored Parcel Post Office at Galataport, which has been renovated as a coastal recreational area with art museums, restaurants and cafés.

The first film screening in Turkey was at Yıldız Palace in 1896, a year after the technology publicly debuted in Paris. Movie theaters rapidly cropped up in Beyoğlu, with the greatest concentration of theaters being along the street now known as İstiklal Avenue. Istanbul also became the heart of Turkey's nascent film industry, although Turkish films were not consistently developed until the 1950s. Since then, Istanbul has been the most popular location to film Turkish dramas and comedies. The Turkish film industry ramped up in the second half of the century, and with Uzak (2002) and My Father and My Son (2005), both filmed in Istanbul, the nation's movies began to see substantial international success. Istanbul and its picturesque skyline have also served as a backdrop for several foreign films, including From Russia with Love (1963), Topkapi (1964), The World Is Not Enough (1999), and Mission Istaanbul (2008).

Coinciding with this cultural reemergence was the establishment of the Istanbul Festival, which began showcasing a variety of art from Turkey and around the world in 1973. From this flagship festival came the International Istanbul Film Festival and the Istanbul Jazz Festival in the early 1980s. With its focus now solely on music and dance, the Istanbul Festival has been known as the Istanbul International Music Festival since 1994. The most prominent of the festivals that evolved from the original Istanbul Festival is the Istanbul Biennial, held every two years since 1987. Its early incarnations were aimed at showcasing Turkish visual art, and it has since opened to international artists and risen in prestige to join the elite biennales, alongside the Venice Biennale and the São Paulo Art Biennial.

=== Leisure and entertainment ===
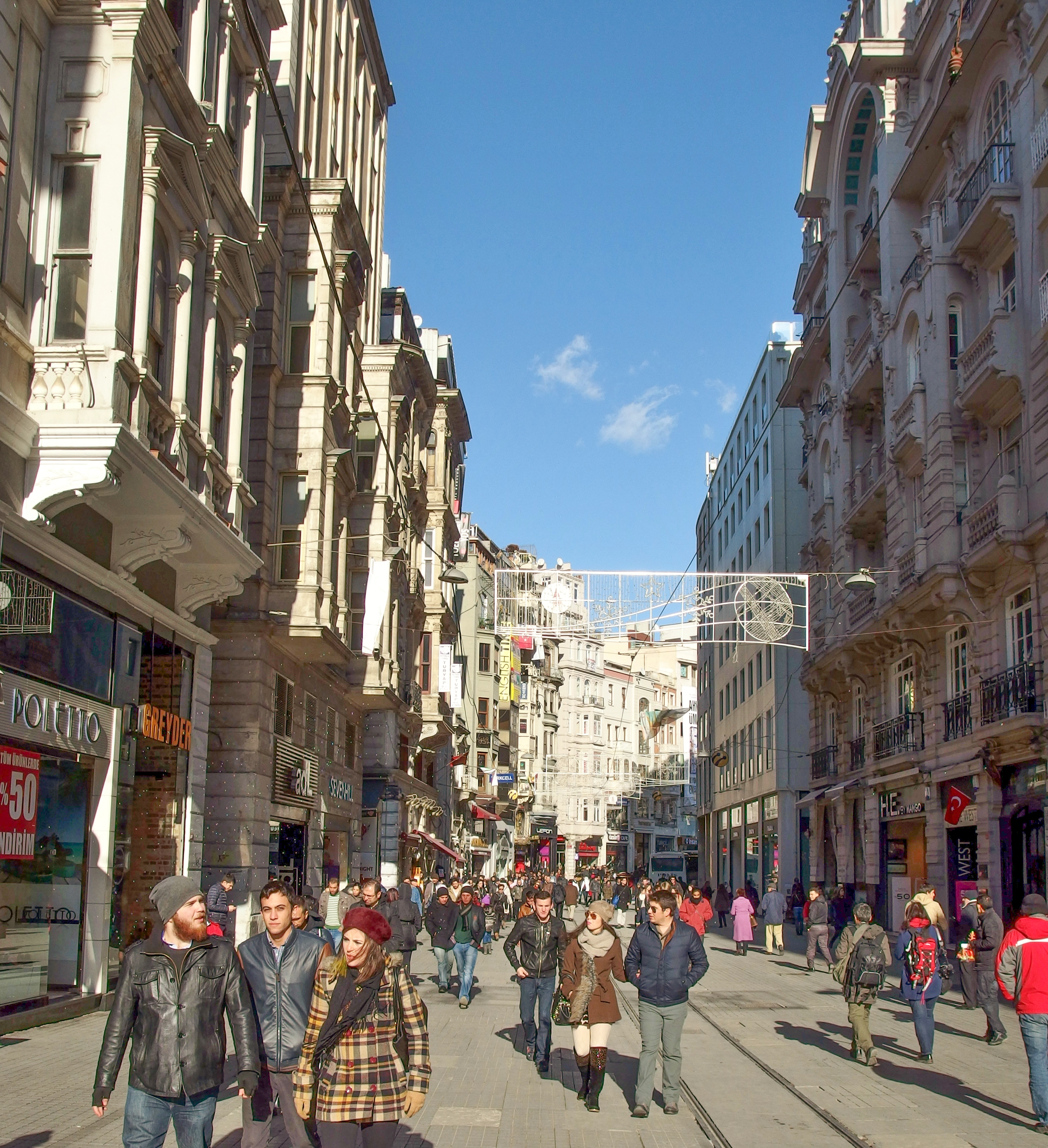
İstiklal Avenue in Beyoğlu

Abdi İpekçi Street in Nişantaşı, Galataport Shopping Area in Karaköy and Bağdat Avenue on the Anatolian side of the city have evolved into high-end shopping districts. Other focal points for shopping, leisure and entertainment include Nişantaşı, Ortaköy, Bebek and Kadıköy. The city has numerous shopping centers, from the historic to the modern. Istanbul also has an active nightlife and historic taverns, a signature characteristic of the city for centuries, if not millennia.

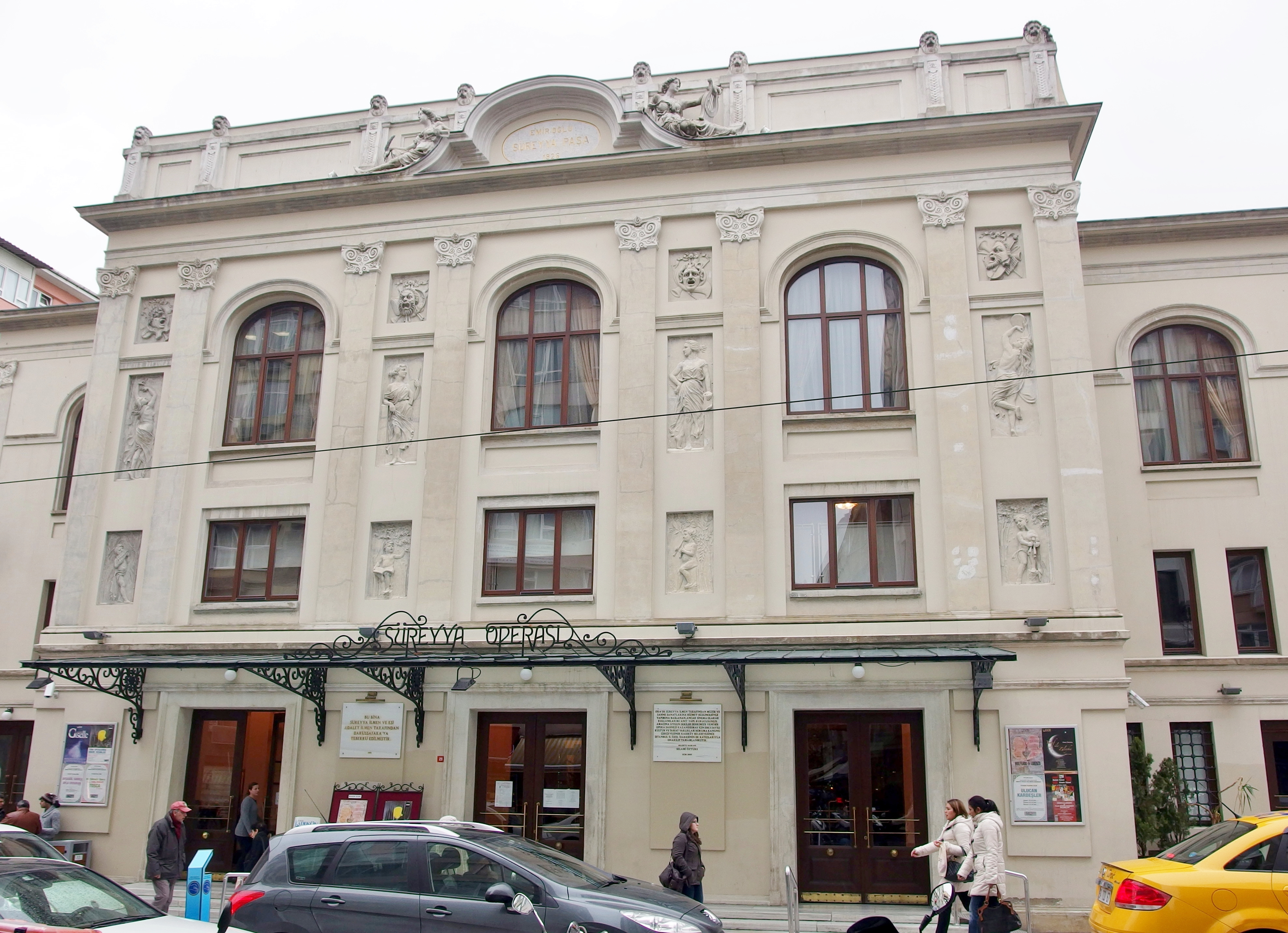
Süreyya Opera House is situated on the Asian side of Istanbul and Atatürk Cultural Center is the main opera house on the European side

The Grand Bazaar, in operation since 1461, is among the world's oldest and largest covered markets. Mahmutpasha Bazaar is an open-air market extending between the Grand Bazaar and the Spice Bazaar, which has been Istanbul's major spice market since 1660.

Galleria Ataköy ushered in the age of modern shopping malls in Turkey when it opened in 1987. Since then, malls have become major shopping centers outside the historic peninsula. Akmerkez was awarded the titles of "Europe's best" and "World's best" shopping mall by the International Council of Shopping Centers in 1995 and 1996; Istanbul Cevahir has been one of the continent's largest since opening in 2005; and Kanyon won the Cityscape Architectural Review Award in the Commercial Built category in 2006. Zorlu Center and İstinye Park are among the other upscale malls in Istanbul which include the stores of the world's top fashion brands.

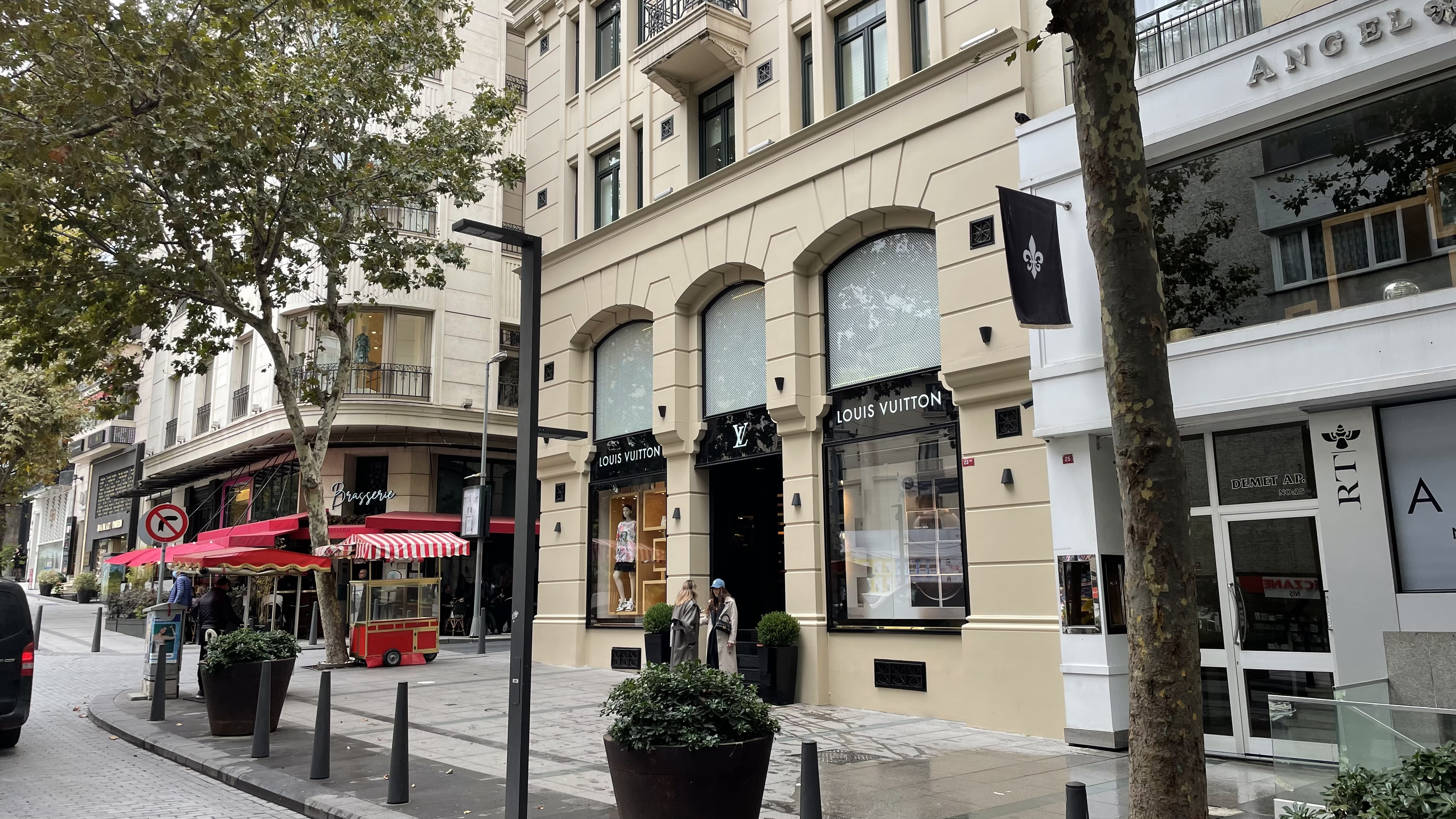
Abdi İpekçi Street in Nişantaşı, one of Istanbul's premier shopping streets

Along İstiklal Avenue is the Çiçek Pasajı ('Flower Passage'), a 19th-century shopping gallery which is today home to winehouses (known as meyhanes), pubs and restaurants. İstiklal Avenue, originally known for its taverns, has shifted toward shopping, but the nearby Nevizade Street is still lined with winehouses and pubs. Some other neighborhoods around İstiklal Avenue have been revamped to cater to Beyoğlu's nightlife, with formerly commercial streets now lined with pubs, cafes, and restaurants playing live music.

Istanbul is known for its historic seafood restaurants. Many of the city's most popular and upscale seafood restaurants line the shores of the Bosporus (particularly in neighborhoods like Ortaköy, Bebek, Arnavutköy, Yeniköy, Beylerbeyi and Çengelköy). Kumkapı along the Sea of Marmara has a pedestrian zone that hosts about fifty fish restaurants.

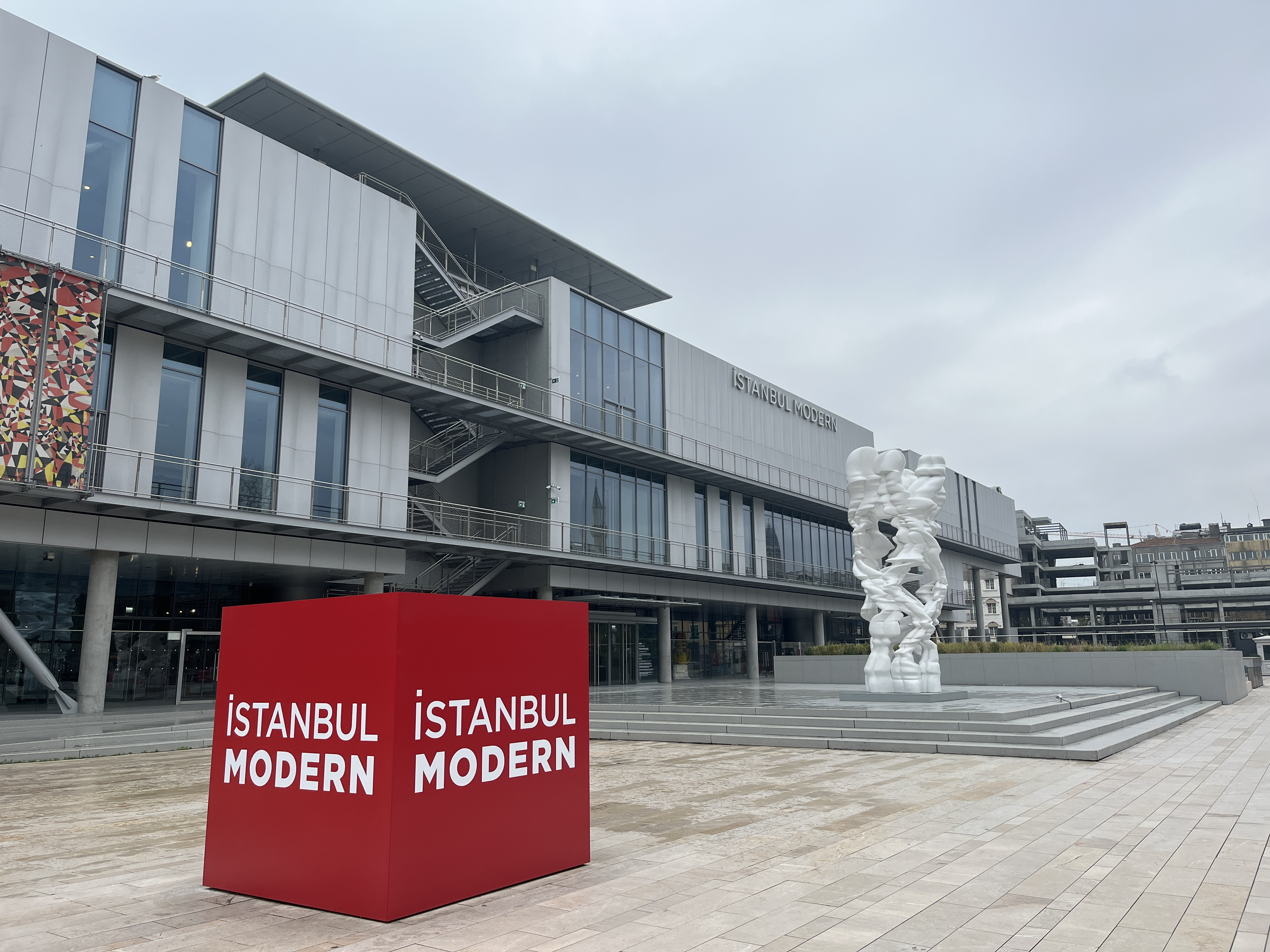
The Istanbul Modern Art Museum designed by Renzo Piano

The Princes' Islands, 15 kilometers (9 mi) from the city center, are also popular for their seafood restaurants. Because of their restaurants, historic summer mansions, and tranquil, car-free streets, the Princes' Islands are a popular vacation destination among Istanbulites and foreign tourists.

Istanbul is also famous for its sophisticated and elaborately cooked dishes of the Ottoman cuisine. Following the influx of immigrants from southeastern and eastern Turkey, which began in the 1960s, the city's foodscape has drastically changed by the end of the century; with influences of Middle Eastern cuisine such as kebab taking an important place in the food scene.

Restaurants featuring foreign cuisines are mainly concentrated in the Beyoğlu, Beşiktaş, Şişli and Kadıköy districts.

Apart from the city's numerous stadiums, sports halls and concert halls, there are several open-air venues for concerts and festivals, such as the Cemil Topuzlu Open-Air Theatre in Harbiye, Paraf Kuruçeşme Open-Air on the Bosphorus shore in Kuruçeşme, and Parkorman in the forest of Maslak. The annual Istanbul Jazz Festival has been held every year since 1994. Organized between 2003 and 2013, Rock'n Coke was the biggest open-air rock festival in Turkey, sponsored by Coca-Cola. It was traditionally held at the Hezarfen Airfield in Istanbul.

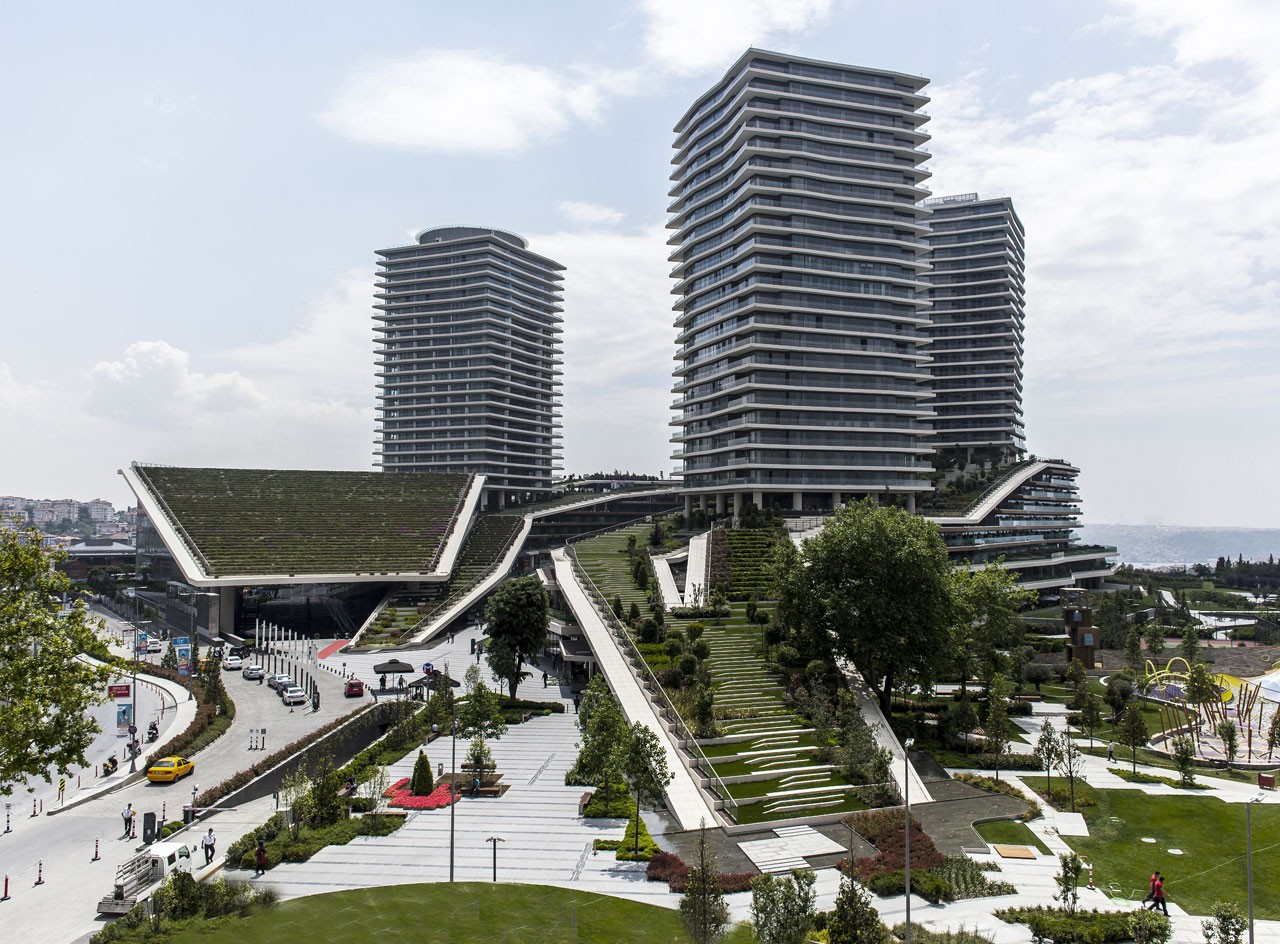
Zorlu Center, designed by EAA and Tabanlıoğlu Architects, includes Zorlu PSM, the city's largest performing arts theatre and concert hall

The Istanbul International Music Festival has been held annually since 1973, and the International Istanbul Film Festival has been held annually since 1982. The Istanbul Biennial is a contemporary art exhibition that has been held biennially since 1987. The Istanbul Shopping Fest is an annual shopping festival held since 2011, and Teknofest is an annual festival of aviation, aerospace and technology, held since 2018.

When it was held for the first time in 2003, the annual Istanbul Pride became the first gay pride event in a Muslim-majority country. Since 2015, all types of parades at Taksim Square and İstiklal Avenue (where, in 2013, the Gezi Park protests took place) have been denied permission by the AKP government, citing security concerns, but hundreds of people have defied the ban each year. Critics have claimed that the bans were in fact due to ideological reasons.

== Sports ==
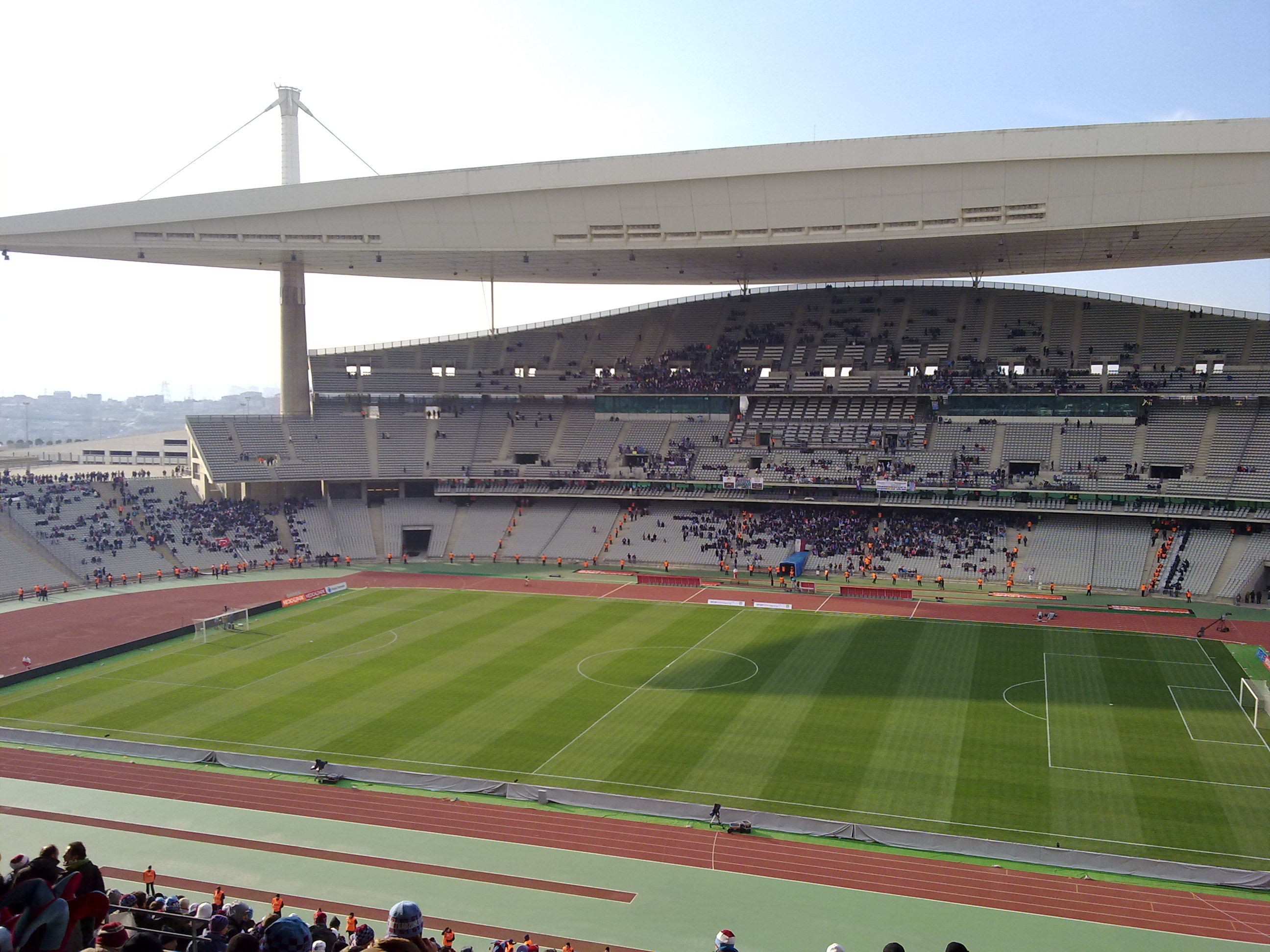
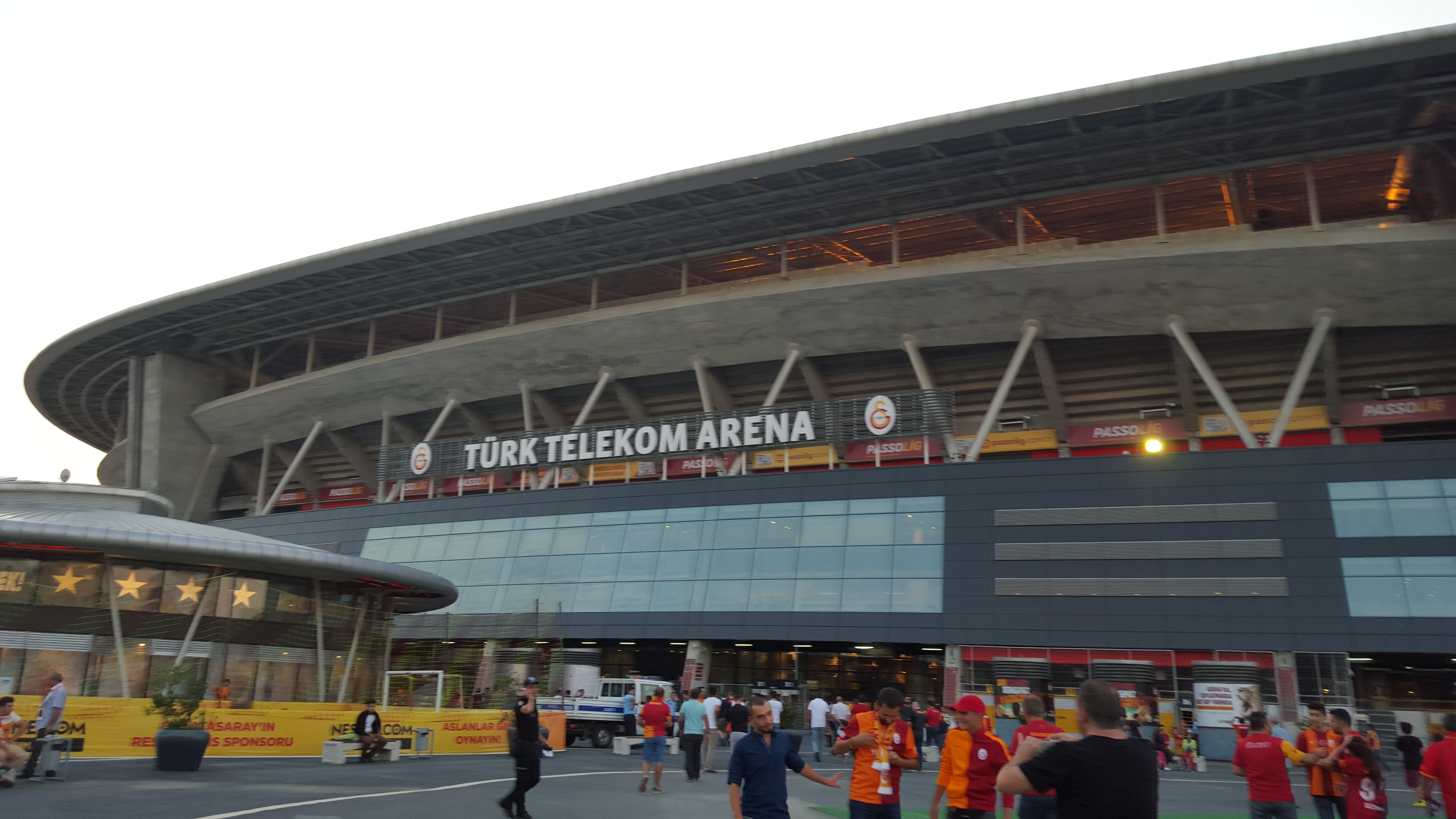
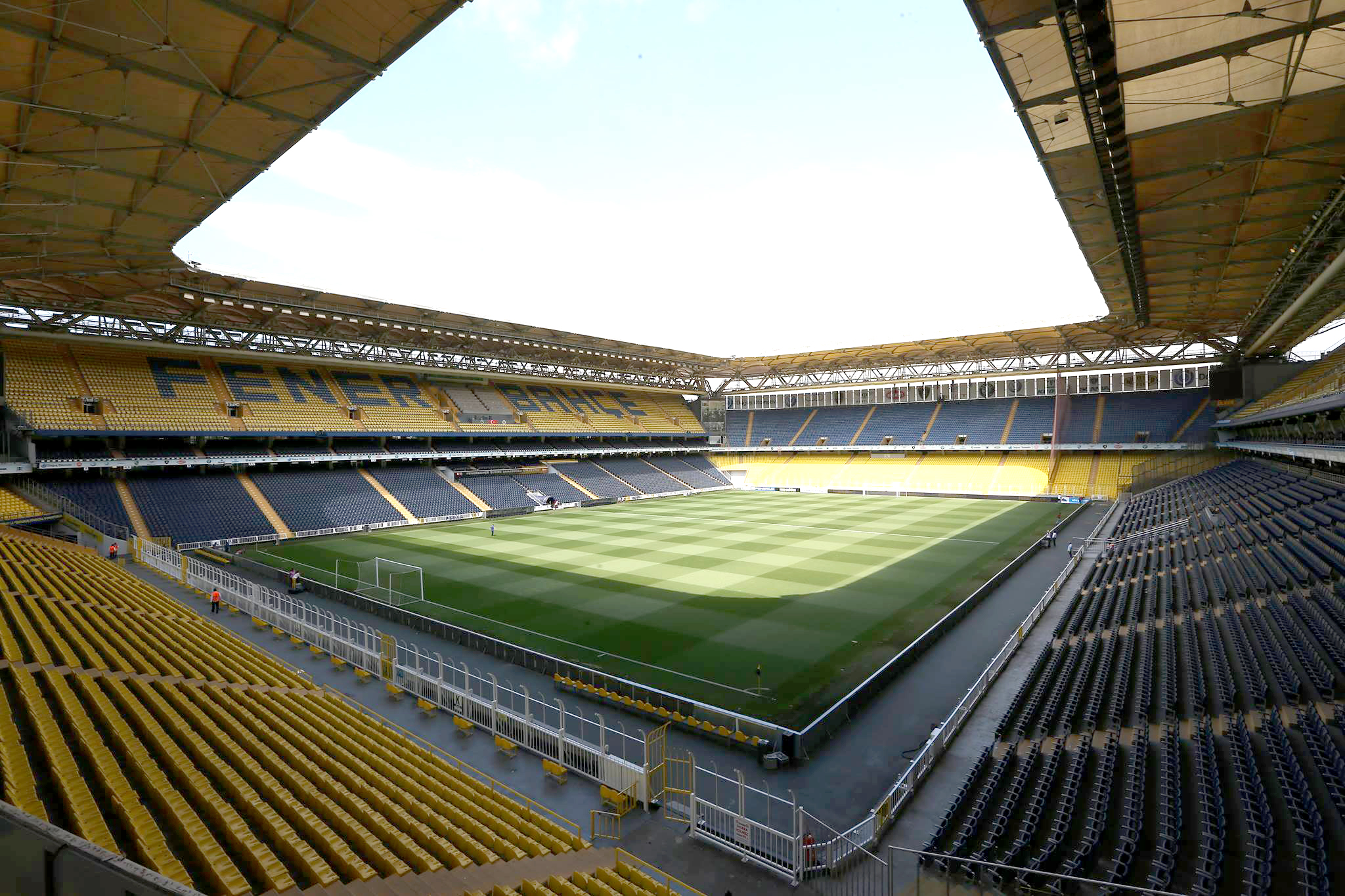
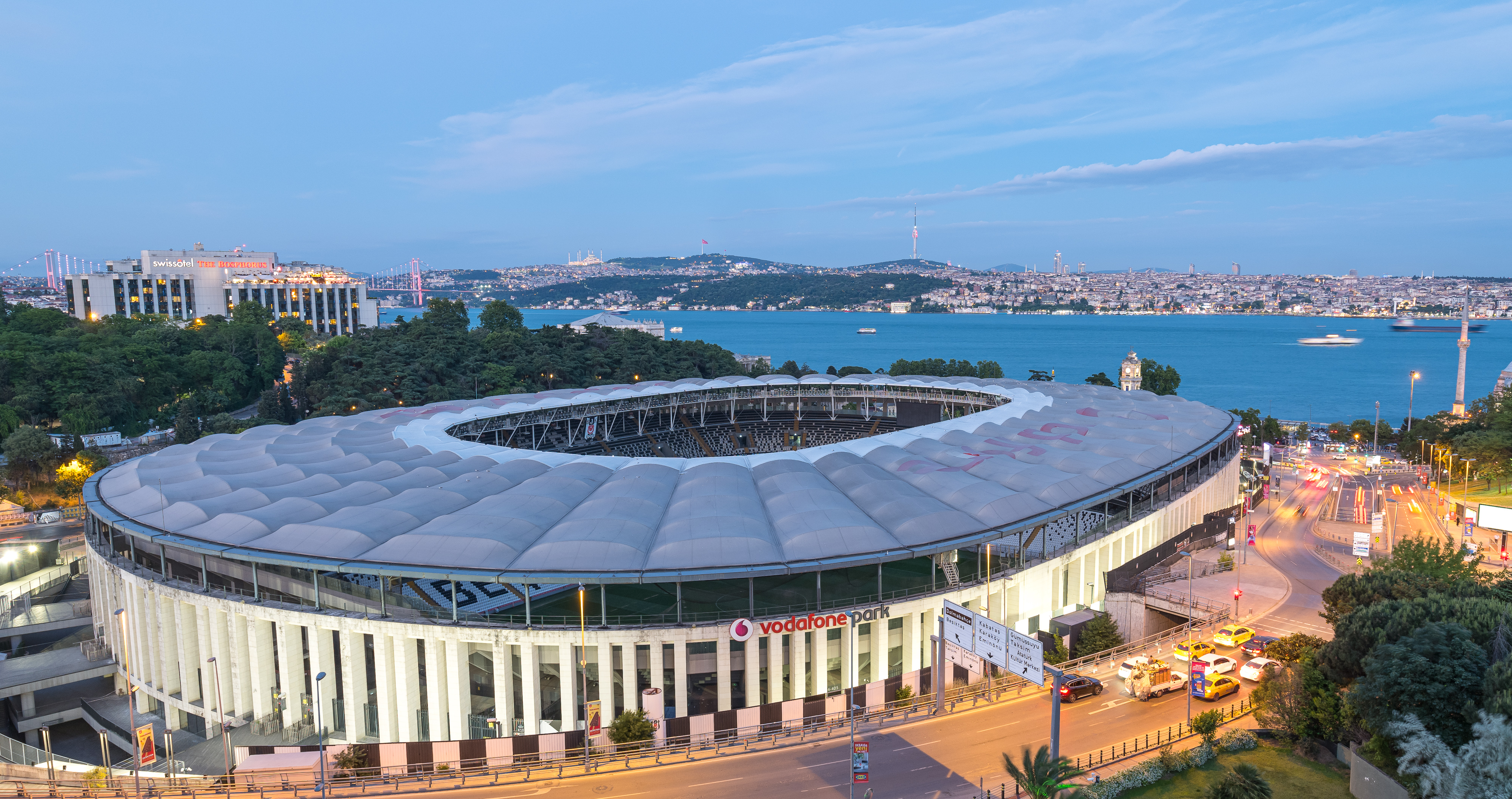
1. Atatürk Olympic Stadium
2. Rams Park
3. Şükrü Saracoğlu Stadium
4. Beşiktaş Stadium

Istanbul is home to some of Turkey's oldest sports clubs. Beşiktaş J.K., established in 1903, is considered the oldest of these sports clubs. Due to its initial status as Turkey's only club, Beşiktaş occasionally represented the Ottoman Empire and Turkish Republic in international sports competitions, earning the right to place the Turkish flag inside its team logo. Galatasaray S.K. and Fenerbahçe S.K. have fared better in international competitions and have won more Süper Lig titles, at 24 and 19 times, respectively. Galatasaray and Fenerbahçe have a long-standing rivalry, with Galatasaray based in the European part and Fenerbahçe based in the Anatolian part of the city. Istanbul has seven basketball teams – Anadolu Efes, Beşiktaş, Darüşşafaka, Fenerbahçe, Galatasaray, İstanbul Büyükşehir Belediyespor and Büyükçekmece – that play in the premier-level Basketbol Süper Ligi.

Many of Istanbul's sports facilities have been built or upgraded since 2000 to bolster the city's bids for the Summer Olympic Games. Atatürk Olympic Stadium, the largest multi-purpose stadium in Turkey, was completed in 2002 as an IAAF first-class venue for track and field. The stadium hosted the 2005 UEFA Champions League Final, and was selected by the UEFA to host the CL Final games of 2020 and 2021, which were relocated to Lisbon (2020) and Porto (2021) due to the COVID-19 pandemic. Şükrü Saracoğlu Stadium, Fenerbahçe's home field, hosted the 2009 UEFA Cup Final three years after its completion. Türk Telekom Arena opened in 2011 to replace Ali Sami Yen Stadium as Galatasaray's home turf, while Beşiktaş Stadium, opened in 2016 to replace BJK İnönü Stadium as the home turf of Beşiktaş, hosted the 2019 UEFA Super Cup game. All four stadiums are elite Category 4 (formerly five-star) UEFA stadiums. (Note: UEFA does not apparently keep a list of Category 4 stadiums, but regulations stipulate that only these elite stadiums are eligible to host UEFA Champions League Finals, which Atatürk Olympic Stadium did in 2005, and UEFA Europa League (formerly UEFA Cup) Finals, which Şükrü Saracoğlu Stadium did in 2009. Türk Telekom Arena is noted as an elite UEFA stadium by its architects.)

The Sinan Erdem Dome, among the largest indoor arenas in Europe, hosted the final of the 2010 FIBA World Championship, the 2012 IAAF World Indoor Championships, as well as the 2011–12 Euroleague and 2016–17 EuroLeague Final Fours. Prior to the completion of the Sinan Erdem Dome in 2010, Abdi İpekçi Arena was Istanbul's primary indoor arena, having hosted the finals of EuroBasket 2001. Several other indoor arenas, including the Beşiktaş Akatlar Arena, have also been inaugurated since 2000, serving as the home courts of Istanbul's sports clubs. The most recent of these is the 13,800-seat Ülker Sports Arena, which opened in 2012 as the home court of Fenerbahçe's basketball teams. Despite the construction boom, five bids for the Summer Olympics – in 2000, 2004, 2008, 2012, and 2020 – and national bids for UEFA Euro 2012 and UEFA Euro 2016 have ended unsuccessfully. The city will host the 2027 edition of the European Games.

The TVF Burhan Felek Sport Hall is one of the major volleyball arenas in the city and hosts clubs such as Eczacıbaşı, Vakıfbank SK, and Fenerbahçe who have won numerous European and World Championship titles.

Between the 2005–2011 seasons, and in the 2020 season, Istanbul Park racing circuit hosted the Formula One Turkish Grand Prix. The 2021 F1 Turkish Grand Prix was initially cancelled due to the COVID-19 pandemic, but on 25 June 2021, it was announced that the 2021 F1 Turkish Grand Prix will take place on 3 October 2021. Istanbul Park was also a venue of the World Touring Car Championship and the European Le Mans Series in 2005 and 2006, but the track has not seen either of these competitions since then. It also hosted the Turkish Motorcycle Grand Prix between 2005 and 2007. Istanbul was occasionally a venue of the F1 Powerboat World Championship, with the last race on the Bosporus strait on 12–13 August 2000. The last race of the Powerboat P1 World Championship on the Bosporus took place on 19–21 June 2009. Istanbul Sailing Club, established in 1952, hosts races and other sailing events on the waterways in and around Istanbul each year.

== Media ==
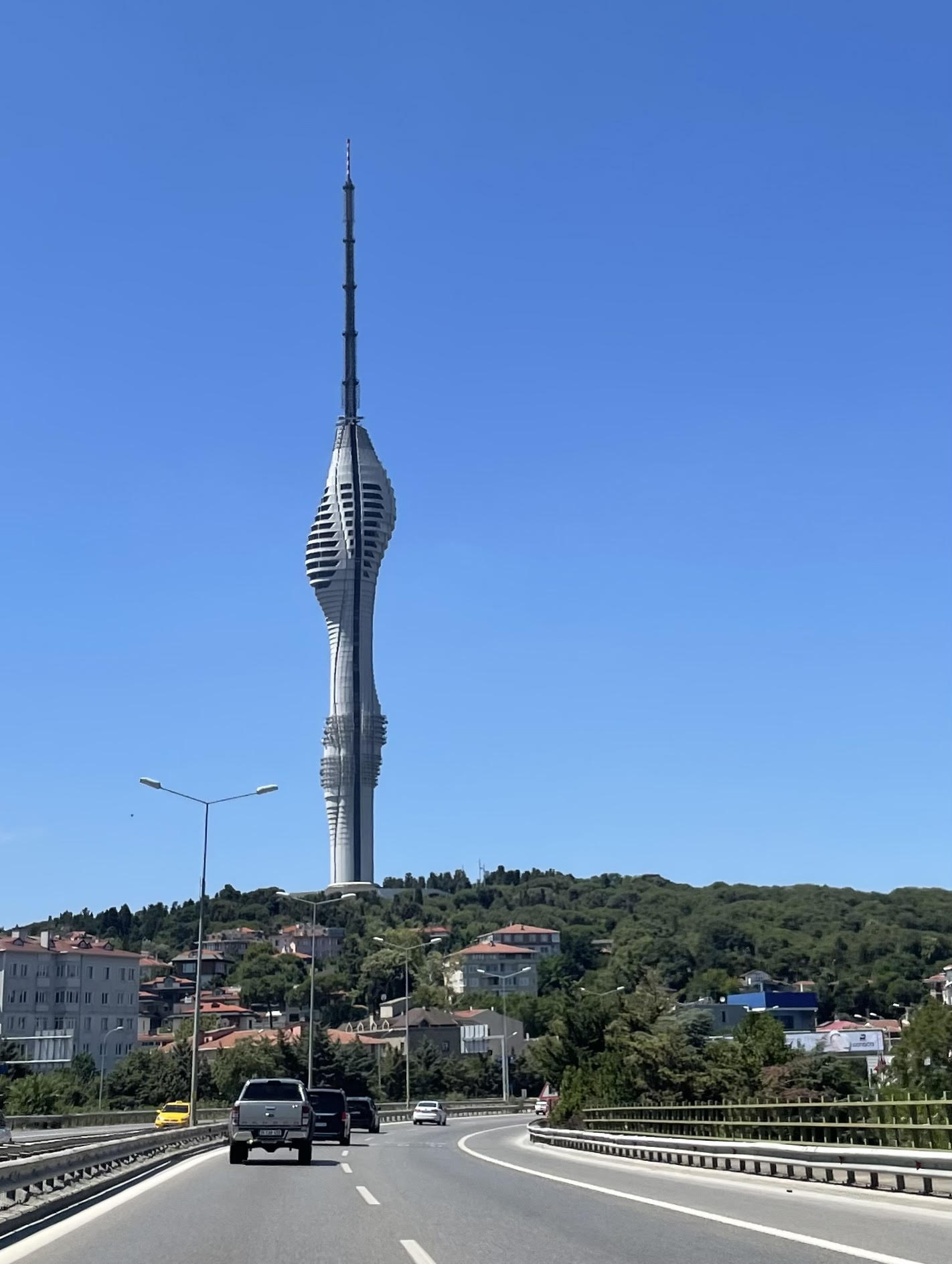
Küçük Çamlıca TV Radio Tower (369 m (1,211 ft)) is the tallest structure in the city

Most state-run radio and television stations are based in Ankara, but Istanbul is the primary hub of Turkish media. The industry has its roots in the former Ottoman capital, where the first Turkish newspaper, Takvim-i Vekayi (Calendar of Affairs), was published in 1831. The Cağaloğlu street on which the newspaper was printed, Bâb-ı Âli Street, rapidly became the center of Turkish print media, alongside Beyoğlu across the Golden Horn.

Istanbul now has a wide variety of periodicals. Most nationwide newspapers are based in Istanbul, with simultaneous Ankara and İzmir editions. Hürriyet, Sabah, Posta and Sözcü, the country's top four papers, are all headquartered in Istanbul, boasting more than 275,000 weekly sales each. Hürriyet's English-language edition, Hürriyet Daily News, has been printed since 1961, but the English-language Daily Sabah, first published by Sabah in 2014, has overtaken it in circulation. Several smaller newspapers, including popular publications like Cumhuriyet, Milliyet and Habertürk are also based in Istanbul. Istanbul also has long-running Armenian language newspapers, notably the dailies Marmara and Jamanak and the bilingual weekly Agos in Armenian and Turkish.

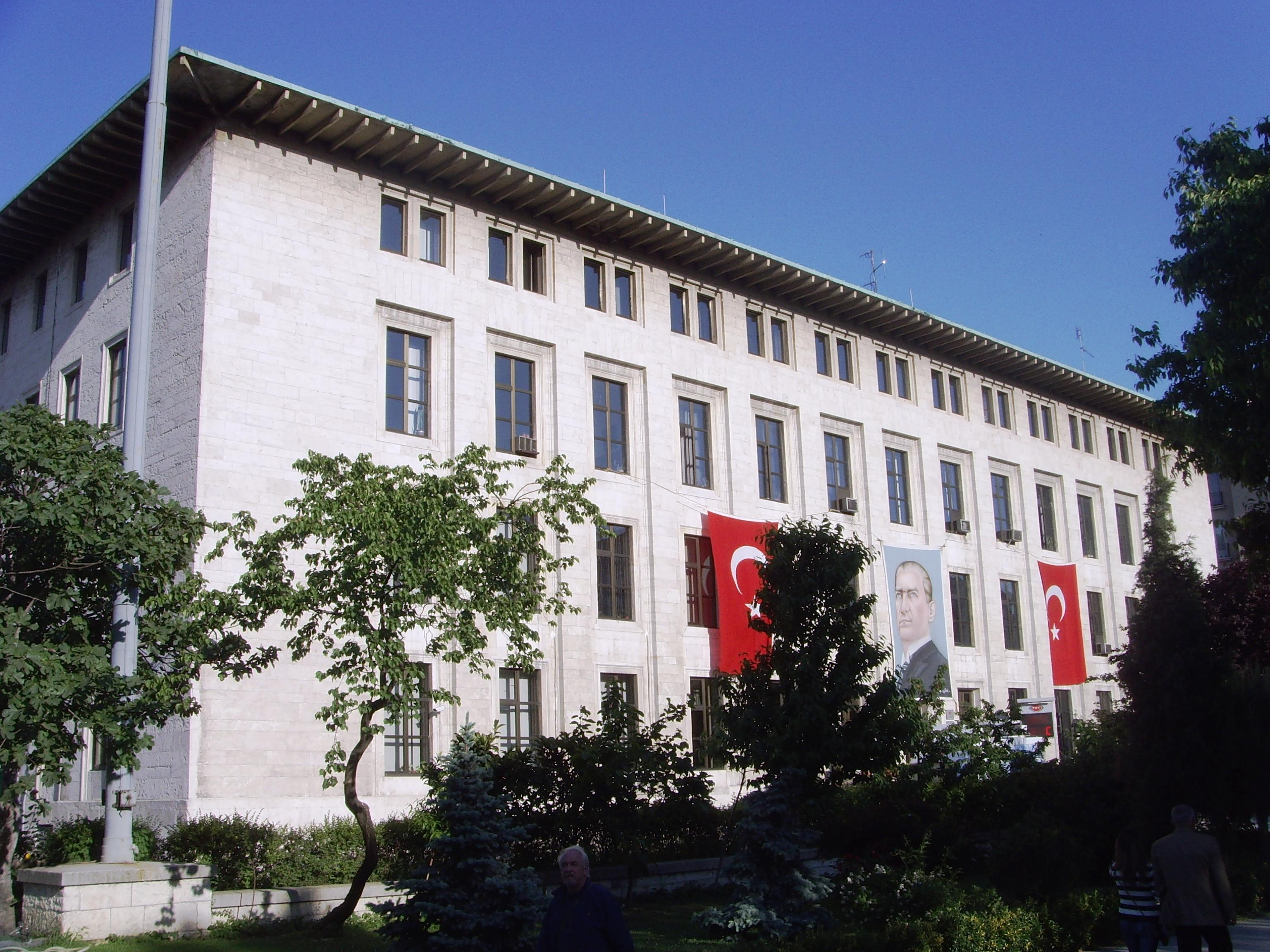
Istanbul Radio House

Office in Eminönü. Control of this transmission, and other radio stations established in the following decades, ultimately came under the state-run Turkish Radio and Television Corporation (TRT), which held a monopoly on radio and television broadcasts between its founding in 1964 and 1990. Today, TRT runs four national radio stations; these stations have transmitters across the country so each can reach over 90% of the country's population, but only Radio 2 is based in Istanbul. Offering a range of content from educational programming to coverage of sporting events, Radio 2 is the most popular radio station in Turkey. Istanbul's airwaves are the busiest in Turkey, primarily featuring either Turkish-language or English-language content. One of the exceptions, offering both, is Açık Radyo (94.9 FM). Among Turkey's first private stations, and the first featuring foreign popular music, was Istanbul's Metro FM (97.2 FM). The state-run Radio 3, although based in Ankara, also features English-language popular music, and English-language news programming is provided on NTV Radyo (102.8 FM).

TRT-Children is the only TRT television station based in Istanbul. Istanbul is home to the headquarters of several Turkish stations and regional headquarters of international media outlets. Istanbul-based Star TV was the first private television network to be established following the end of the TRT monopoly; Star TV and Show TV (also based in Istanbul) remain highly popular throughout the country, airing Turkish and American series. Kanal D and ATV are other stations in Istanbul that offer a mix of news and series; NTV and 360 – both based in the city – are mainly just known for their news coverage in Turkish. The BBC has a regional office in Istanbul, assisting its Turkish-language news operations. The American news channel CNN licensed its brand to the Turkish-language CNN Türk in 1999.

== Education ==
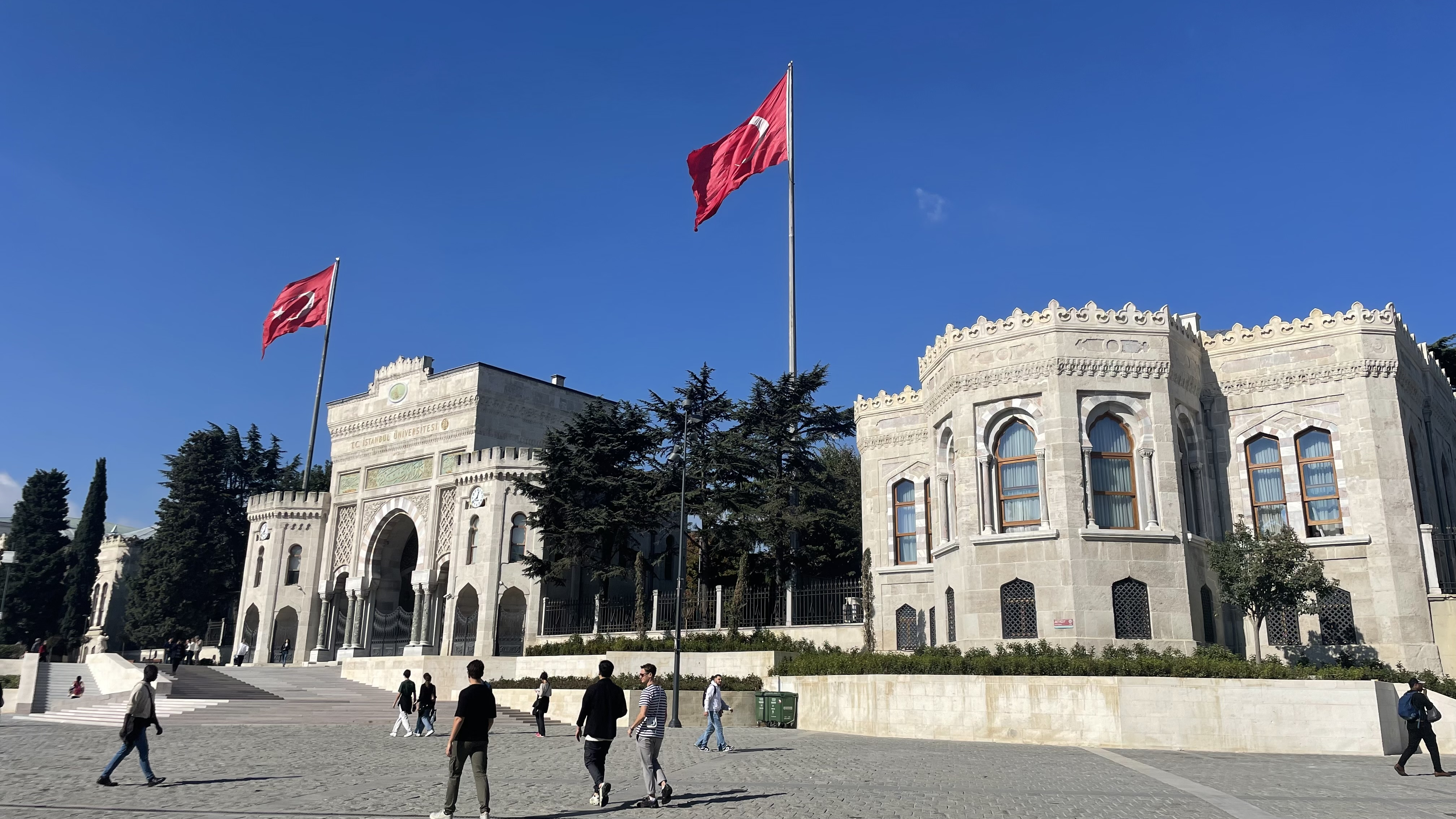
Main entrance gate of Istanbul University, the city's oldest Turkish institution, established in 1453

As of 2019, excluding universities more than 3.1 million students attended 7,437 schools in Istanbul, about half of the schools being private schools. The average class size was 30 for primary education institutes, 27 for vocational schools and 23 for general high schools. Of the 842 public high schools, 263 are vocational schools, another 263 are Anatolian high schools, 207 are religiously oriented İmam Hatip schools, and 14 are STEM-oriented science high schools. Galatasaray High School was established in 1481 and is the oldest public high school in Turkey. Kabataş Erkek Lisesi, Istanbul Lisesi and Cağaloğlu Anatolian High School are among other public high schools in the city. Istanbul also contains high schools established by the European and American expatriates and missionaries in the 19th century that currently offer secular, foreign-language education such as Robert College, Deutsche Schule Istanbul, Sankt Georgs-Kolleg, Lycée Saint-Joseph and Liceo Italiano di Istanbul. Furthermore Turkish citizens of Jewish, Armenian, Greek and Assyrian descent are allowed to establish and attend their respective schools as granted in the Treaty of Lausanne, Phanar Greek Orthodox College being an example. Most high schools are highly selective and demand high scores from the national standardized LGS exam for admission, with Galatasaray and Robert College only accepting the top 0.1% to 0.01% of the exam takers.

Istanbul contains almost a third of all universities in Turkey. As of 2019 Istanbul has 61 colleges and universities, with more than 1.8 million students enrolled according to official figures. Of those, fourteen are state-owned, 44 are "foundation-owned" private universities and three are foundation-owned vocational universities of higher education. There are also military academies, including the Turkish Air Force Academy and Turkish Naval Academy as well as four foundation-owned vocational universities of higher education which are not affiliated with any university.

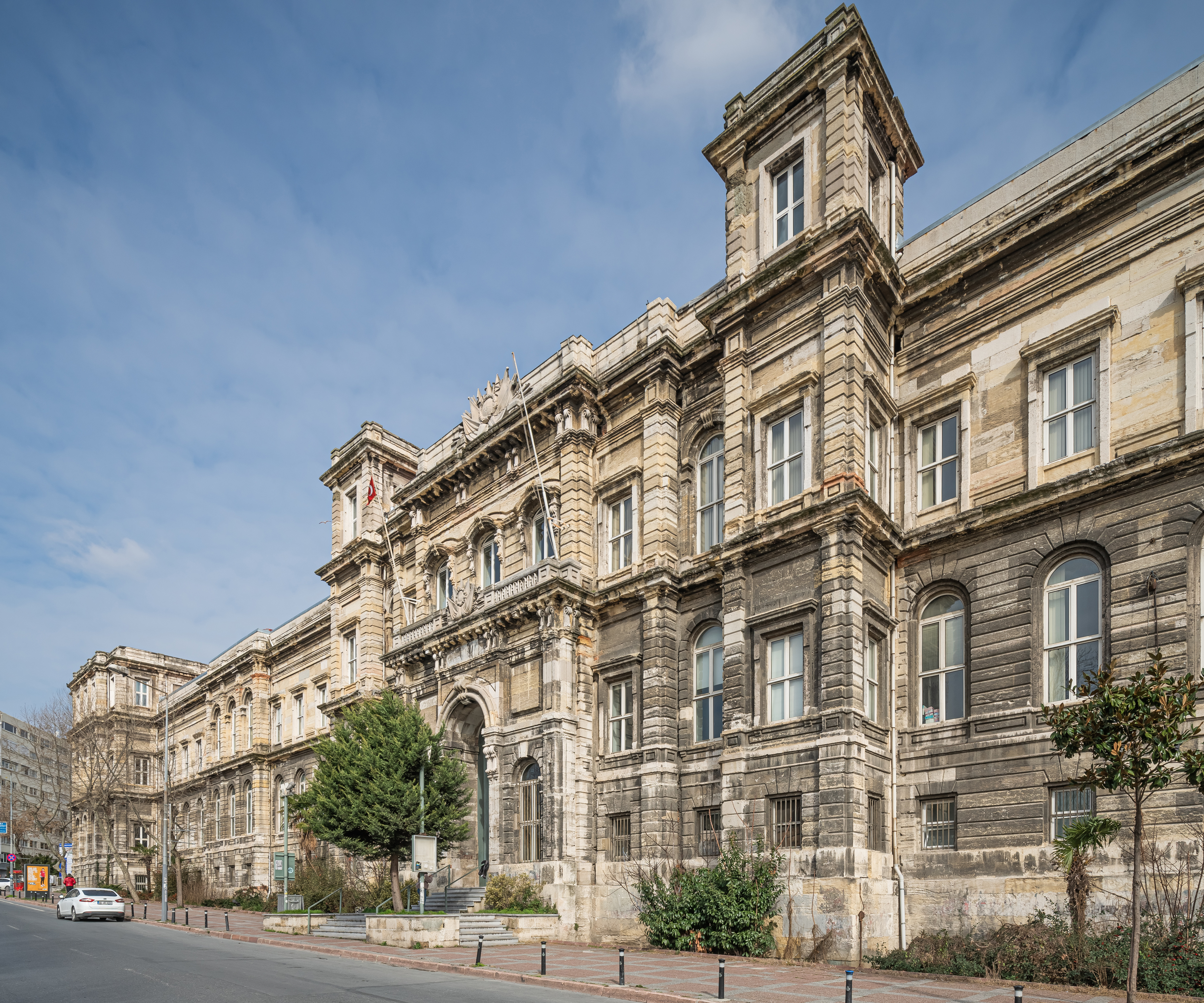
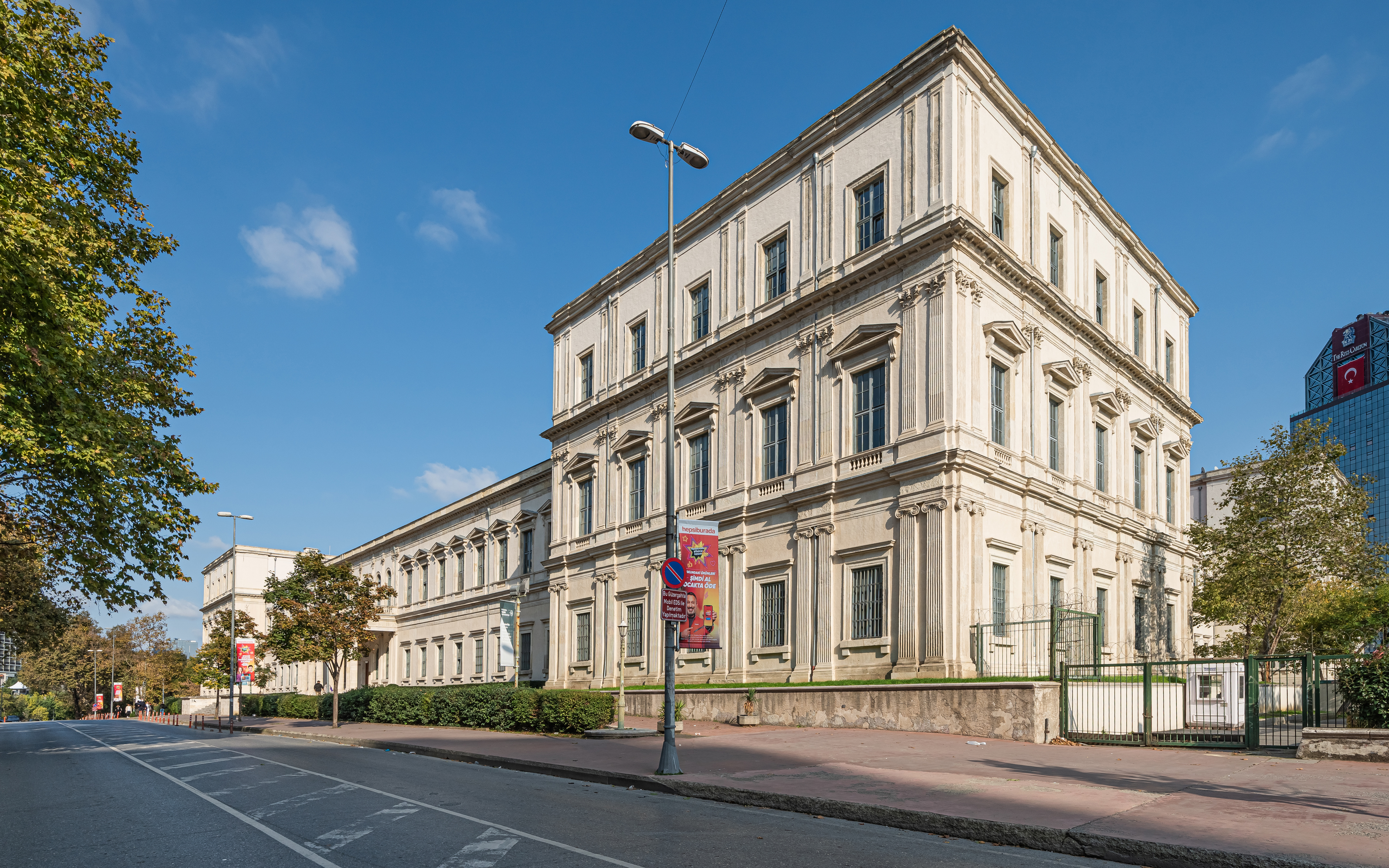
Maçka (left) and Taşkışla (right) campuses of Istanbul Technical University

Some of the most renowned and highly ranked universities in Turkey are in Istanbul. Istanbul University, the nation's oldest institute of higher education, dates back to 1453 and its dental, law, medical schools were founded in the 19th century. The city's largest private universities include Sabancı University, with its main campus in Tuzla, Koç University in Sarıyer, Özyeğin Üniversitesi near Altunizade. Istanbul's first private university, Koç University, was founded as late as 1992, because private universities were not allowed in Turkey before the 1982 amendment to the constitution. Istanbul is also home to several conservatories and art schools, including Mimar Sinan Academy of Fine Arts, founded in 1882.

Public universities with a major presence in the city, such as Istanbul University, Istanbul Technical University (the world's third-oldest university dedicated entirely to engineering, established in 1773), and Boğaziçi University (formerly the higher education section of Robert College until 1971) provide education in English as the primary foreign language, while the primary foreign language of education at Galatasaray University is French.

== Public services ==
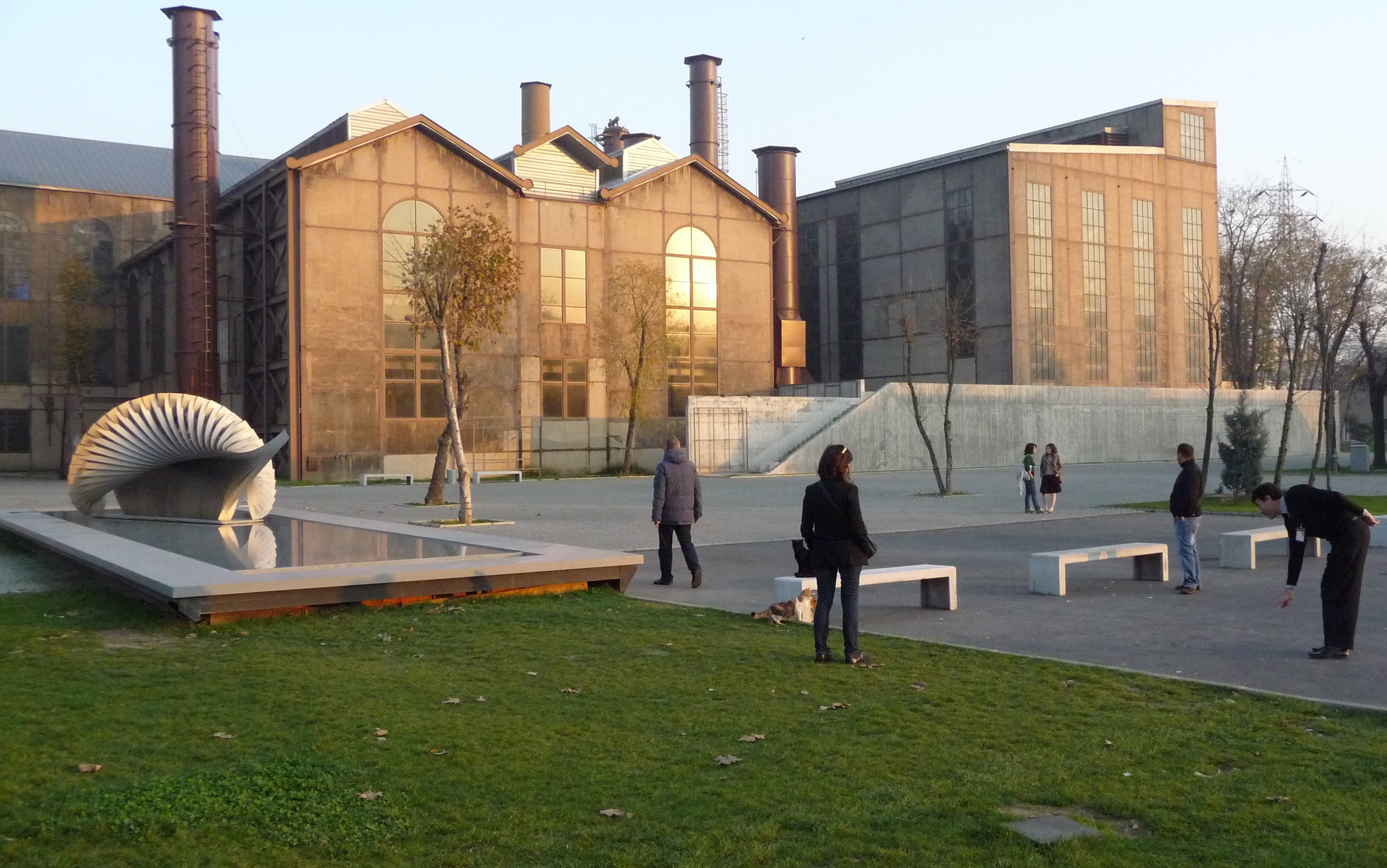
The Silahtarağa Power Station, known as SantralIstanbul, part of the Istanbul Bilgi University, was Istanbul's sole source of power between 1914 and 1952

Istanbul's first water supply systems date back to the city's early history, when aqueducts (such as the Valens Aqueduct) deposited the water in the city's numerous cisterns. At the behest of Suleiman the Magnificent, the Kırkçeşme water supply network was constructed; by 1563, the network provided 4,200 cubic meters (150,000 ft^{3}) of water to 158 sites each day. In later years, in response to increasing public demand, water from various springs was channeled to public fountains, like the Fountain of Ahmed III, by means of supply lines. Today, Istanbul has a chlorinated and filtered water supply and a sewage treatment system managed by the Istanbul Water and Sewerage Administration (İstanbul Su ve Kanalizasyon İdaresi, İSKİ).

The Silahtarağa Power Station, a coal-fired power station along the Golden Horn, was the sole source of Istanbul's electricity between 1914, when its first engine room was completed, and 1952. Following the founding of the Turkish Republic, the plant underwent renovations to accommodate the city's increasing demand; its capacity grew from 23 megawatts in 1923 to a peak of 120 megawatts in 1956. Capacity declined until the power station reached the end of its economic life and shut down in 1983. The state-run Turkish Electrical Authority (TEK) briefly – between its founding in 1970 and 1984 – held a monopoly on the generation and distribution of electricity, but now the authority – since split between the Turkish Electricity Generation Transmission Company (TEAŞ) and the Turkish Electricity Distribution Company (TEDAŞ) – competes with private electric utilities.

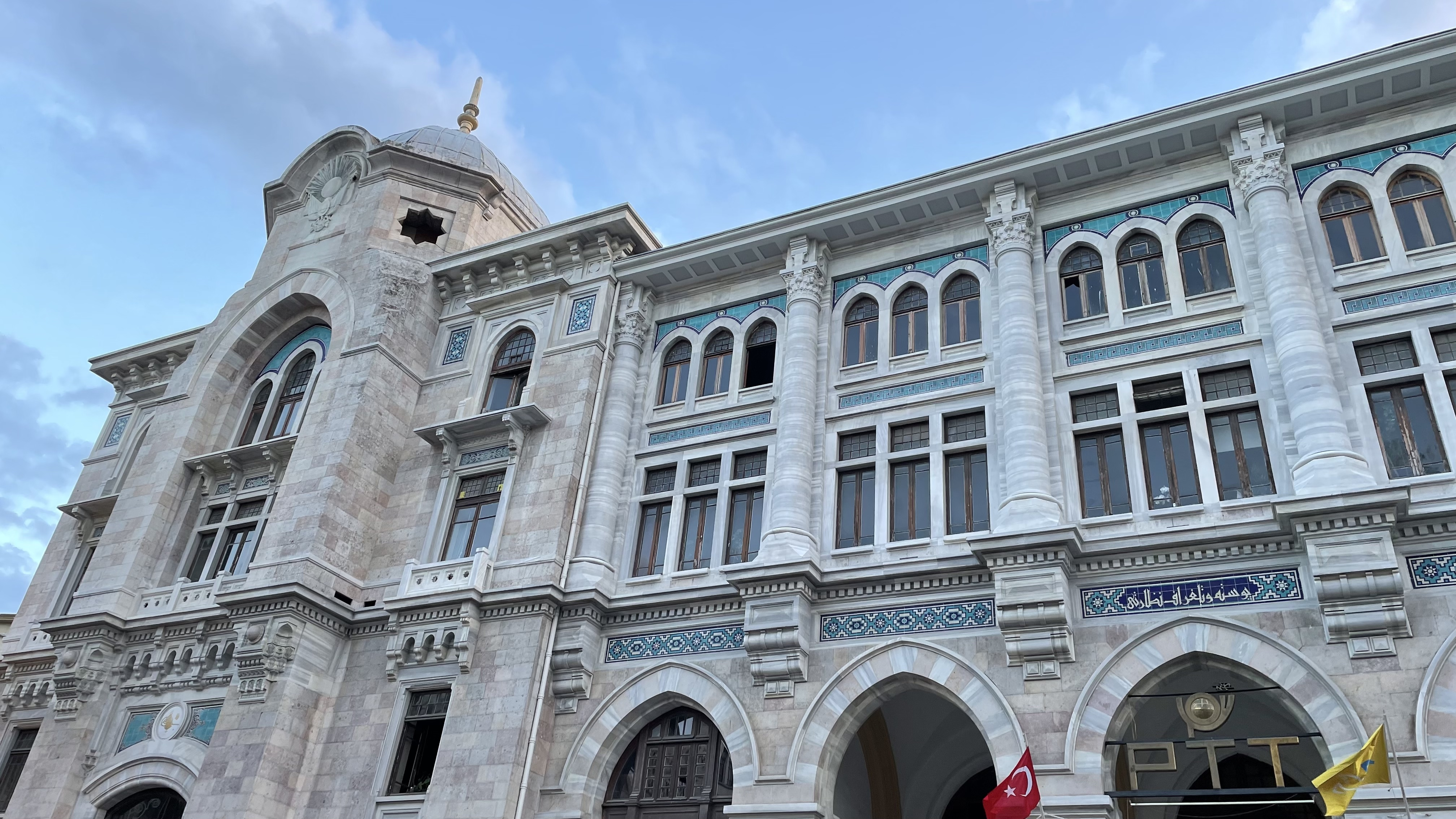
The Grand Post Office in Sirkeci, Istanbul, was designed by Vedat Tek in the Turkish neoclassical style of the early 20th century

The Ottoman Ministry of Post and Telegraph was established in 1840 and the first post office, the Imperial Post Office, opened near the courtyard of Yeni Mosque. By 1876, the first international mailing network between Istanbul and the lands beyond the Ottoman Empire had been established. Sultan Abdülmecid I issued Samuel Morse his first official honor for the electrical telegraph in 1847, and construction of the first telegraph line – between Istanbul and Edirne – finished in time to announce the end of the Crimean War in 1856.

A nascent telephone system began to emerge in Istanbul in 1881 and after the first manual telephone exchange became operational in Istanbul in 1909, the Ministry of Post and Telegraph became the Ministry of Post, Telegraph, and Telephone. GSM cellular networks arrived in Turkey in 1994, with Istanbul among the first cities to receive the service. Today, mobile and landline service is provided by private companies, after Türk Telekom, which split from the Ministry of Post, Telegraph, and Telephone in 1995, was privatized in 2005. Postal services remain under the purview of what is now the Post and Telegraph Organization (retaining the acronym PTT).

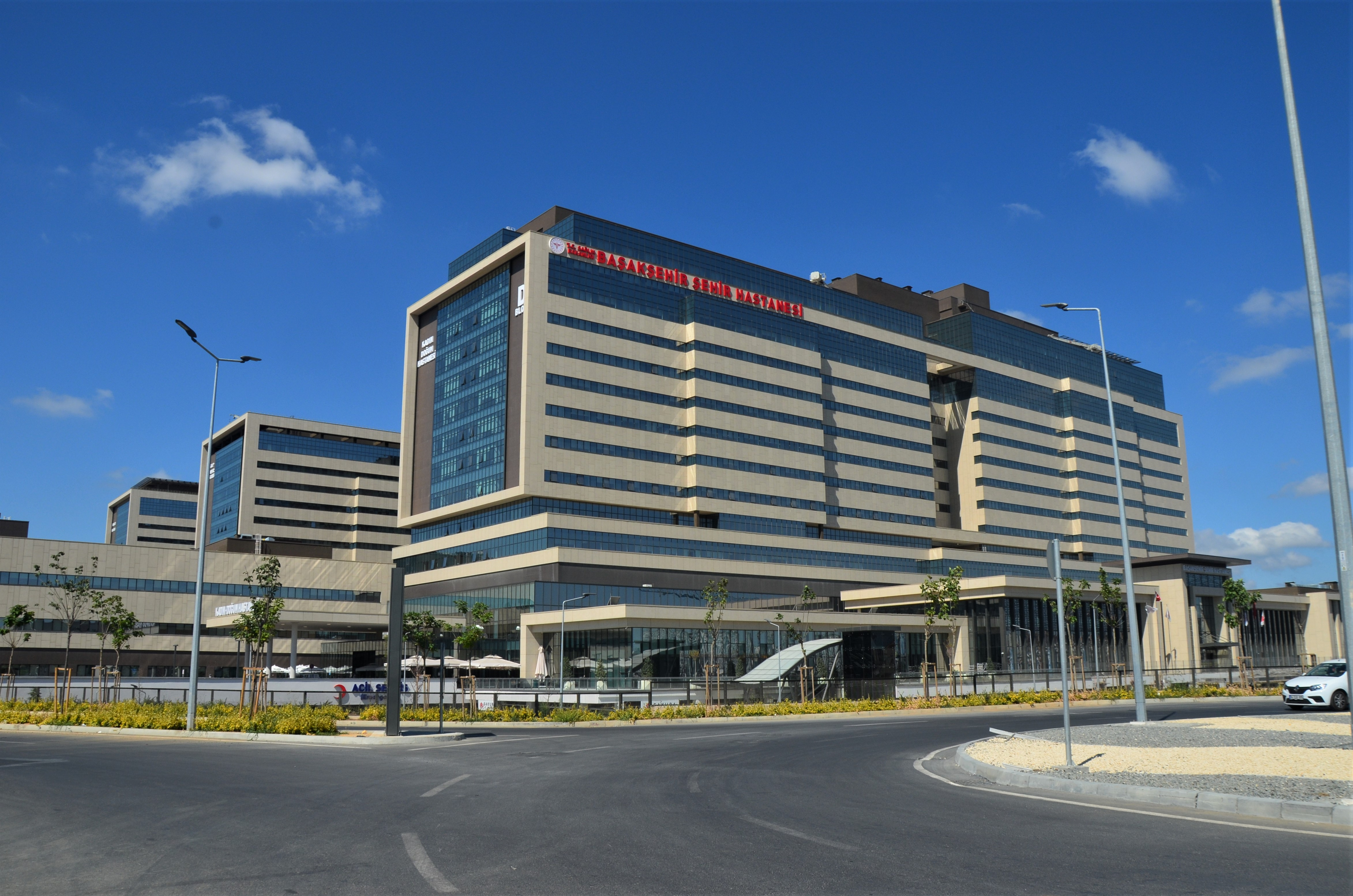
Modern Başakşehir Çam and Sakura City Hospital is a large district general hospital in Başakşehir district of Istanbul.

In 2000, Istanbul had 137 hospitals, of which 100 were private. Turkish citizens are entitled to subsidized healthcare in the nation's state-run hospitals. As public hospitals tend to be overcrowded or otherwise slow, private hospitals are preferable for those who can afford them. Their prevalence has increased significantly over the last decade, as the percentage of outpatients using private hospitals increased from 6% to 23% between 2005 and 2009. Many of these private hospitals, as well as some of the public hospitals, are equipped with high-tech equipment, including MRI machines, or associated with medical research centers. Turkey has more hospitals accredited by the United States–based Joint Commission than any other country in the world, with most concentrated in its big cities. The high quality of healthcare, especially in private hospitals, has contributed to a recent upsurge in medical tourism to Turkey (with a 40% increase between 2007 and 2008). Laser eye surgery and hair transplant surgery is particularly common among medical tourists, as Turkey is known for specializing in the procedure.

== Transportation ==
The suspension bridges at the Bosporus

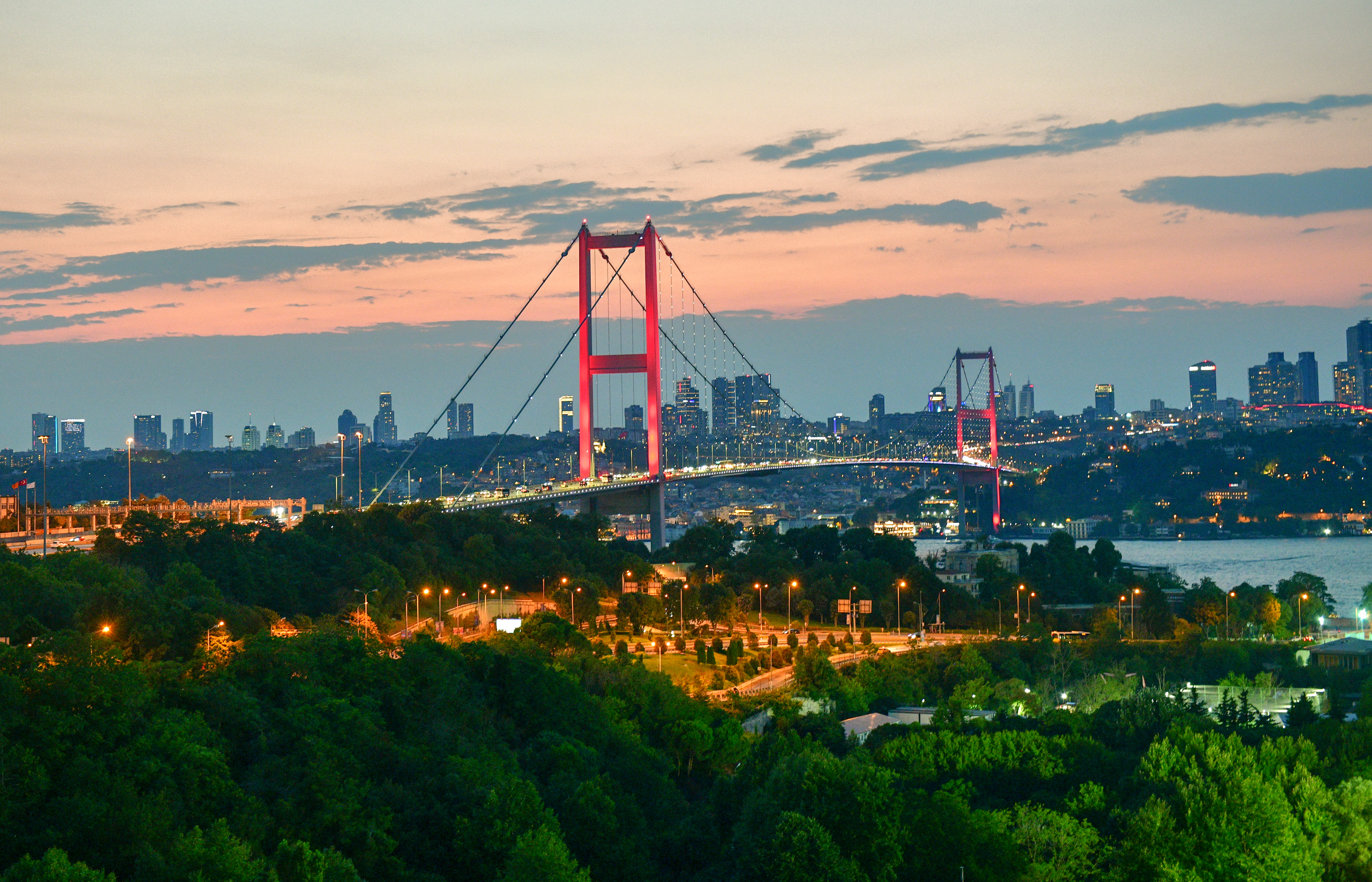
15 July Martyrs Bridge

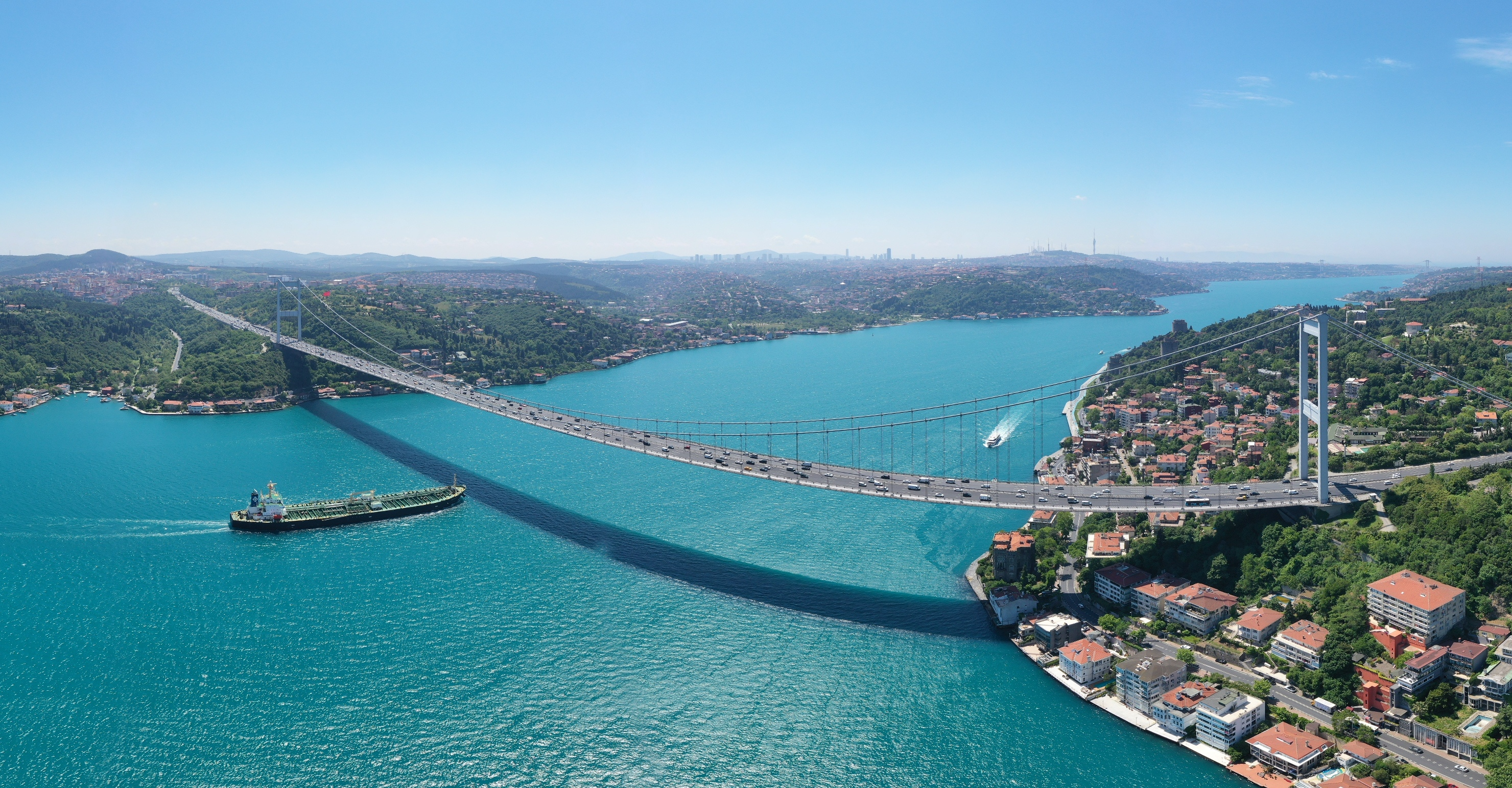
Fatih Sultan Mehmet Bridge

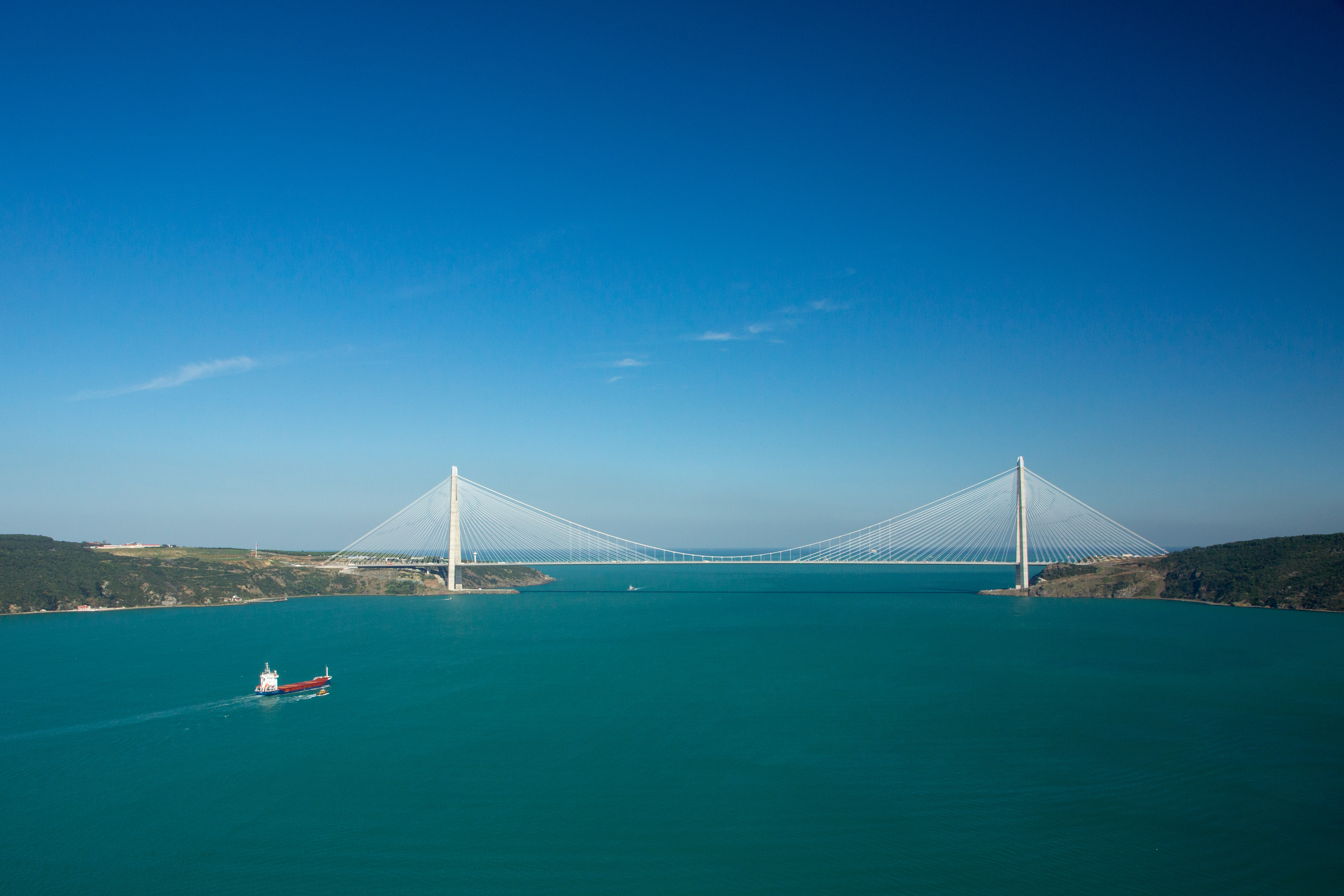
Yavuz Sultan Selim Bridge

=== Roads ===
Istanbul's motorways network are the O-1, O-2, O-3, O-4 and O-7. The total length of Istanbul Province's network of toll roads is 543 km (337 mi) (2024) and the state highways network (devlet yolları) is 353 km (219 mi) (2024), totaling 896 km (557 mi) of expressway roads (minimum 2x2 lanes), excluding secondary roads and urban streets. The density of expressway network is 16.8 km/100 km^{2}. The O-1 forms the city's inner ring road, traversing the Bosphorus Bridge, and the O-2 is the city's outer ring road, crossing the Fatih Sultan Mehmet Bridge. The O-2 continues west to Edirne and the O-4 continues east to Ankara. The O-2, O-3, and O-4 are part of European route E80 (the Trans-European Motorway) between Portugal and the Iran–Turkey border. In 2011, the first and second bridges on the Bosphorus carried 400,000 vehicles each day. The O-7 or Kuzey Marmara Otoyolu, is a motorway that bypass Istanbul to the north. The O-7 motorway from Kinali Gişeleri to Istanbul Park Service has 139.2 km (86.5 mi), with 8 lanes (4x4), and from Odayeri-K10 to Istanbul Atatürk Airport has 30.4 km (18.9 mi). The completed section of highway crosses the Bosporus via the Yavuz Sultan Selim (Third Bosphorus) Bridge, entered service on 26 August 2016. The O-7 (Northern Beltway) 3.Beltway connects Istanbul Atatürk Airport with Istanbul Airport and Sabiha Gökçen Airport. Environmentalist groups worry that the third bridge will endanger the remaining green areas to the north of Istanbul. Apart from the three Bosphorus Bridges, the dual-deck, 14.6-kilometer (9.1 mi) Eurasia Tunnel (which entered service on 20 December 2016) under the Bosphorus strait also provides road crossings for motor vehicles between the Asian and European sides of Turkey. Road transport emits significant carbon dioxide, estimated at 7 million tons in 2021.

=== Public transportation ===
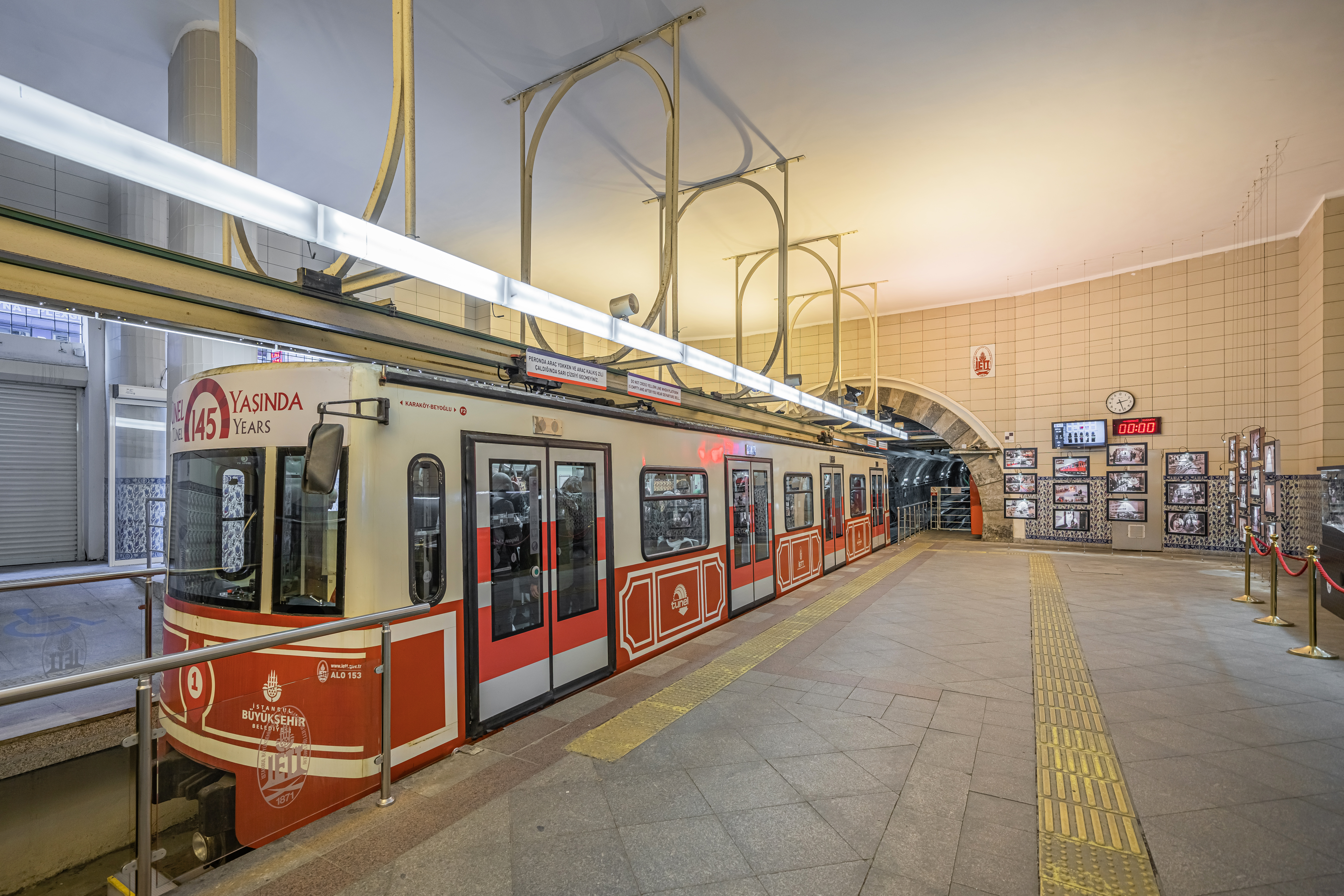
The Tünel was inaugurated on January 17, 1875, making it the second-oldest underground urban railway in the world after the London Underground which opened on January 10, 1863. It was originally powered by two 150 HP steam-power plants. Wagons were lit up with gas lamps due to the lack of electric power in that period.

Istanbul's local public transportation system is a network of commuter rail, trams, funiculars, metro lines, buses, bus rapid transit, and ferries. Fares across modes are integrated, using the contactless Istanbulkart, introduced in 2009, or the older Akbil electronic ticketing device. Trams in Istanbul date back to 1872, when they were horse-drawn, but even the first electrified trams were decommissioned in the 1960s, replaced by a trolleybus system which operated until the 1980s. Operated by Istanbul Electricity, Tramway and Tunnels General Management (İETT), trams slowly returned to the city in the 1990s with the introduction of the Istanbul nostalgic tram and a faster modern tram line, which now carries 265,000 passengers each day. The Tünel opened in 1875 as the world's second-oldest subterranean rail line, after the Metropolitan Railway in London. It still carries passengers between Karaköy and İstiklal Avenue along a steep 573-meter (1,880 ft) track; a more modern funicular between Taksim Square and Kabataş began running in 2006.

The Istanbul Metro comprises ten lines (the M1, M2, M3, M6, M7, M9 and M11 on the European side, and the M4, M5 and M8 on the Asian side) with several other lines (M12 and M14) and extensions under construction. The two sides of Istanbul's metro are connected under the Bosphorus by the Marmaray Tunnel, inaugurated in 2013 as the first rail connection between Thrace and Anatolia, having 13.5 km (8.4 mi) length. The Marmaray tunnel together with the suburban railways lines along the Sea of Marmara, form the intercontinental commuter rail line in Istanbul, named officially B1, from Halkalı on the European side to Gebze on the Asian side. This rail line has 76.6 km (47.6 mi), and the full line opened on 12 March 2019. Until then, buses provide transportation within and between the two-halves of the city, accommodating 2.2 million passenger trips each day. The Metrobus, a form of bus rapid transit, crosses the Bosphorus Bridge, with dedicated lanes leading to its termini.

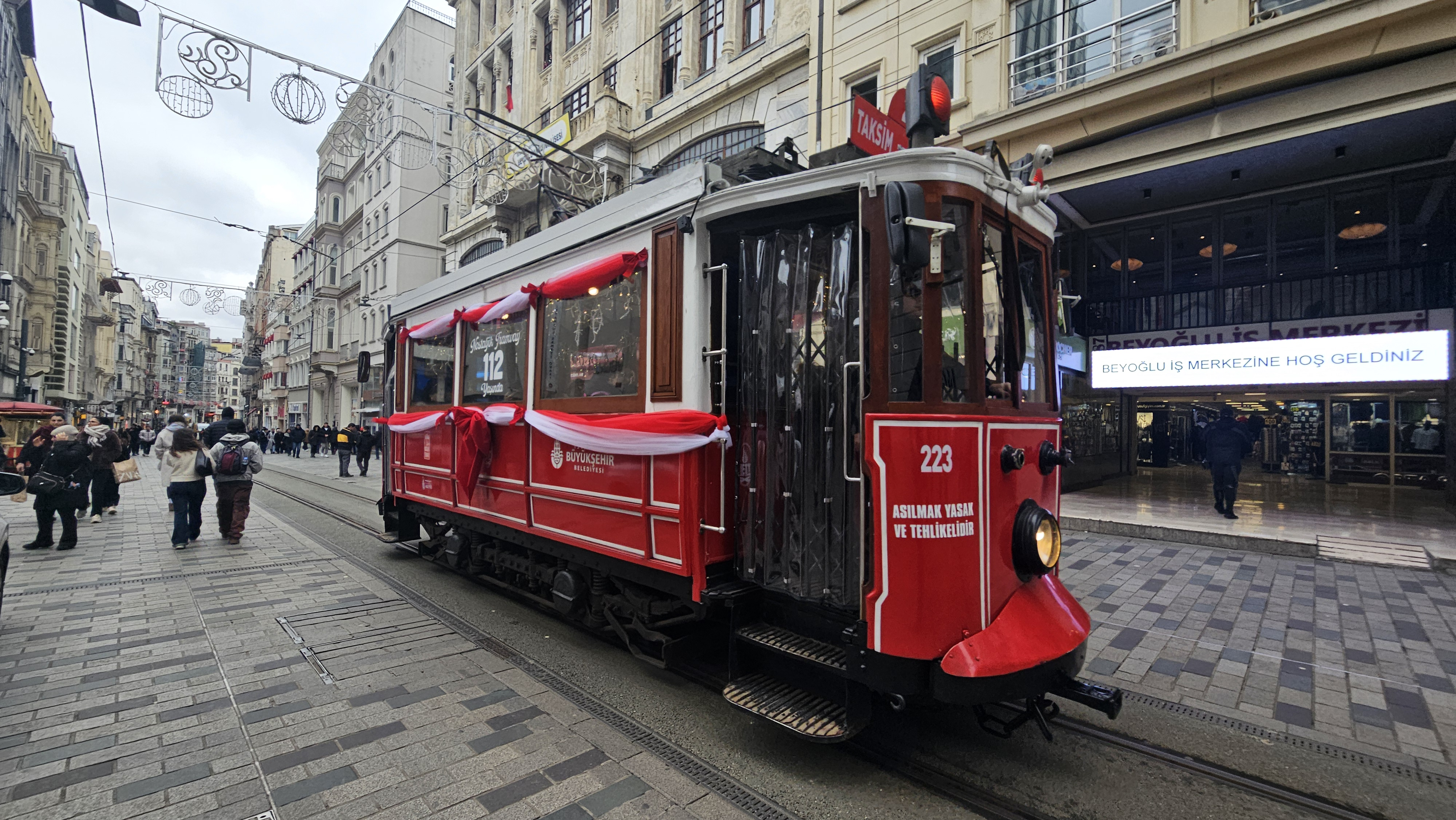
A nostalgic tram on İstiklal Avenue, decorated for the 112th anniversary of the city's electric powered tram service which began in 1914, replacing the horse-drawn tram service between 1872 and 1914

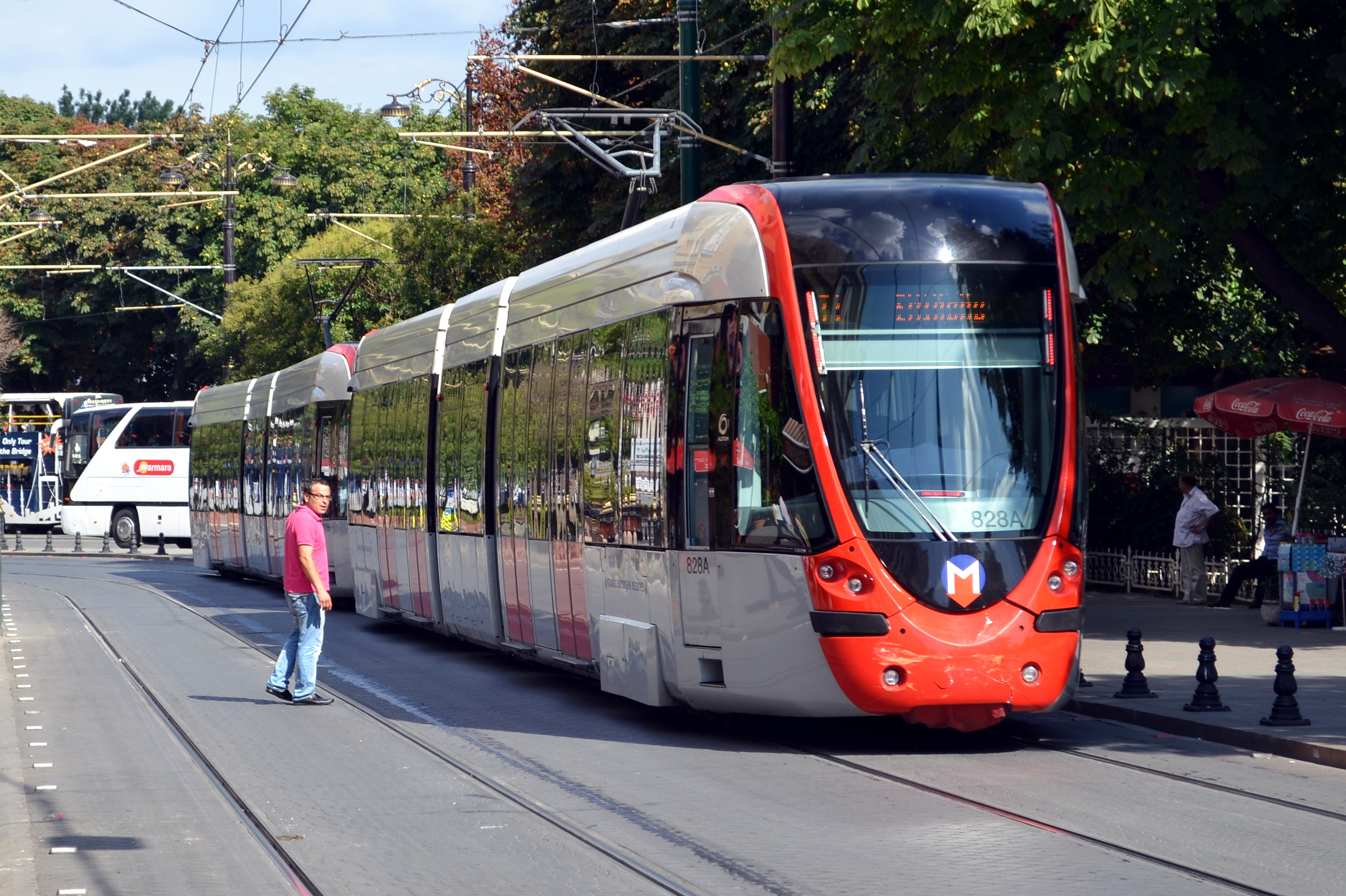
Istanbul modern tram

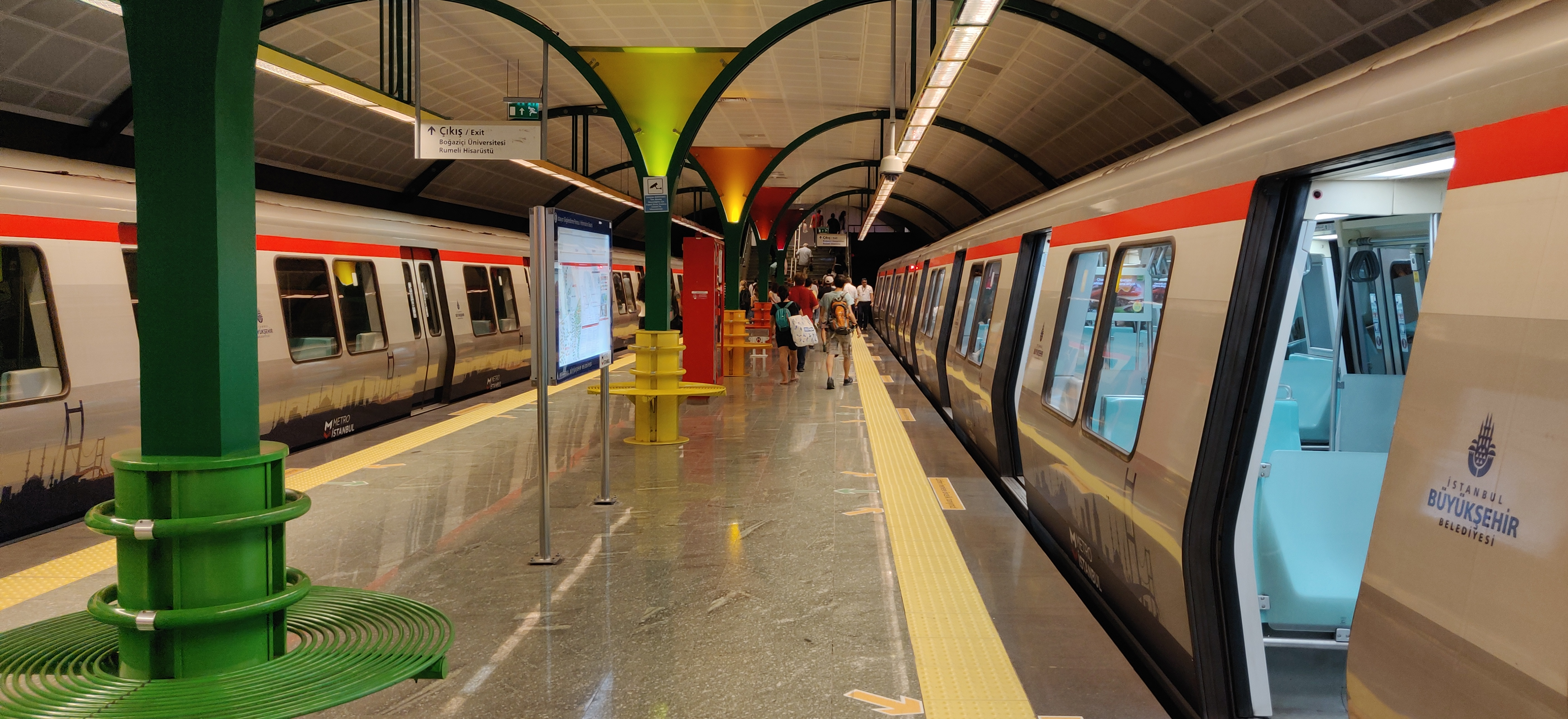
Boğaziçi University station of the Istanbul Metro

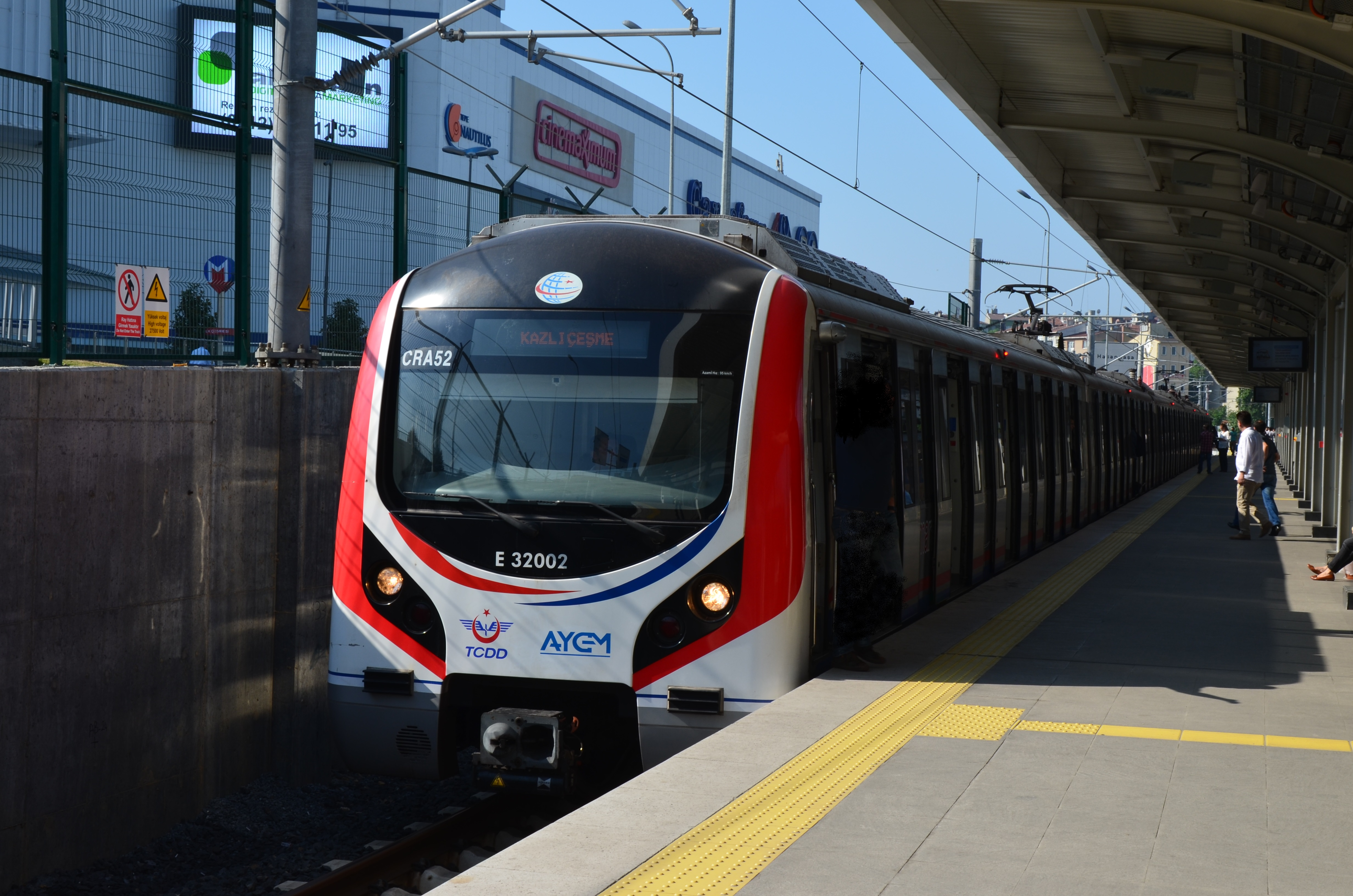
Marmaray commuter rail at Ayrılıkçeşmesi station

=== Ferries ===
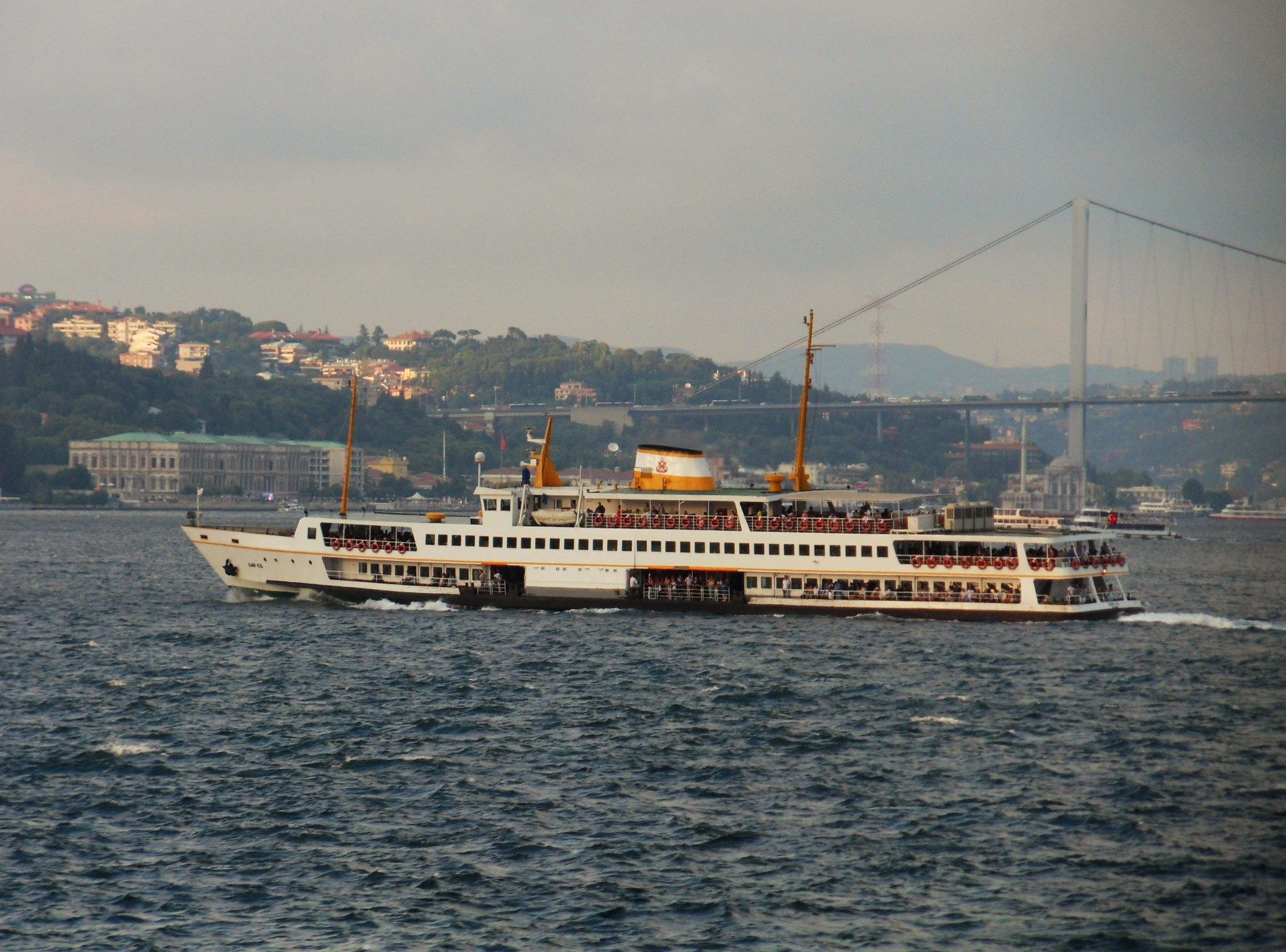
M/V Emin Kul, a vapur operated by Şehir Hatları, crossing the Bosphorus

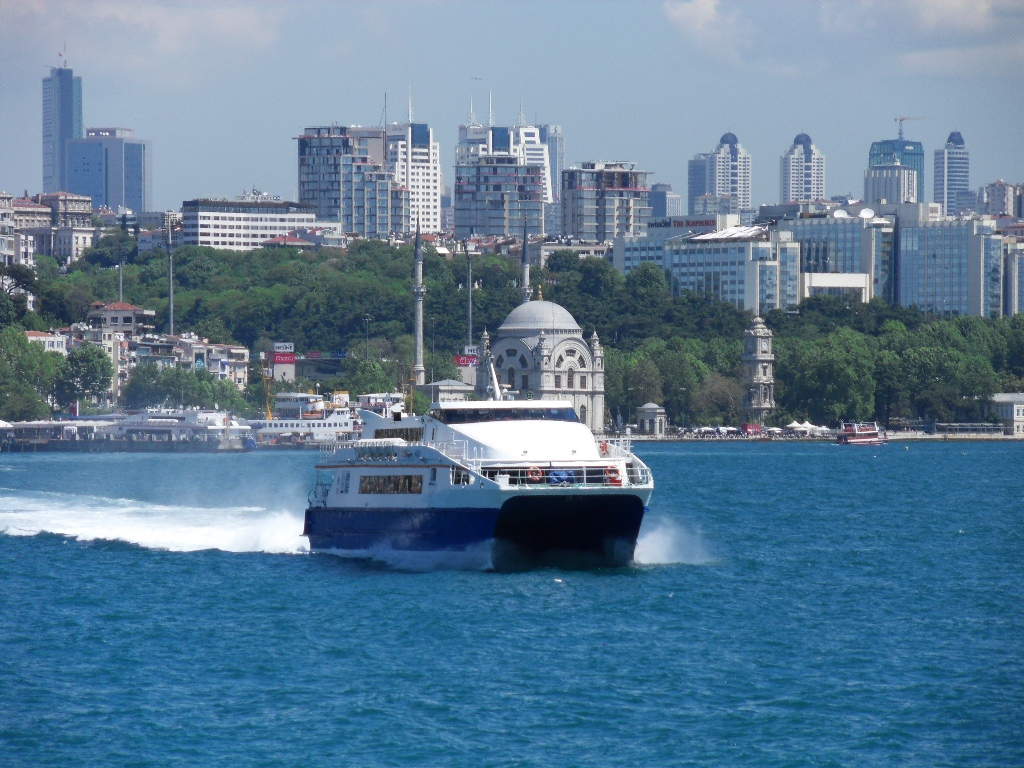
An İDO deniz otobüsü (seabus) high-speed ferry departs Istanbul

There are three main ferry operators in Istanbul. The municipally owned Şehir Hatları operates the traditional vapur ferries on 891 daily trips between 53 piers across the Bosporus and the Princes' Islands.

The privately owned İDO (Istanbul Sea Buses) runs a combination of high-speed passenger ferries and vehicle ferries within Istanbul and to destinations across the Sea of Marmara. A smaller private company, Turyol also operates services across the Bosphorus. The city's main cruise ship terminal is the Port of Istanbul in Karaköy, with a capacity of 10,000 passengers per hour.

=== Railroads ===
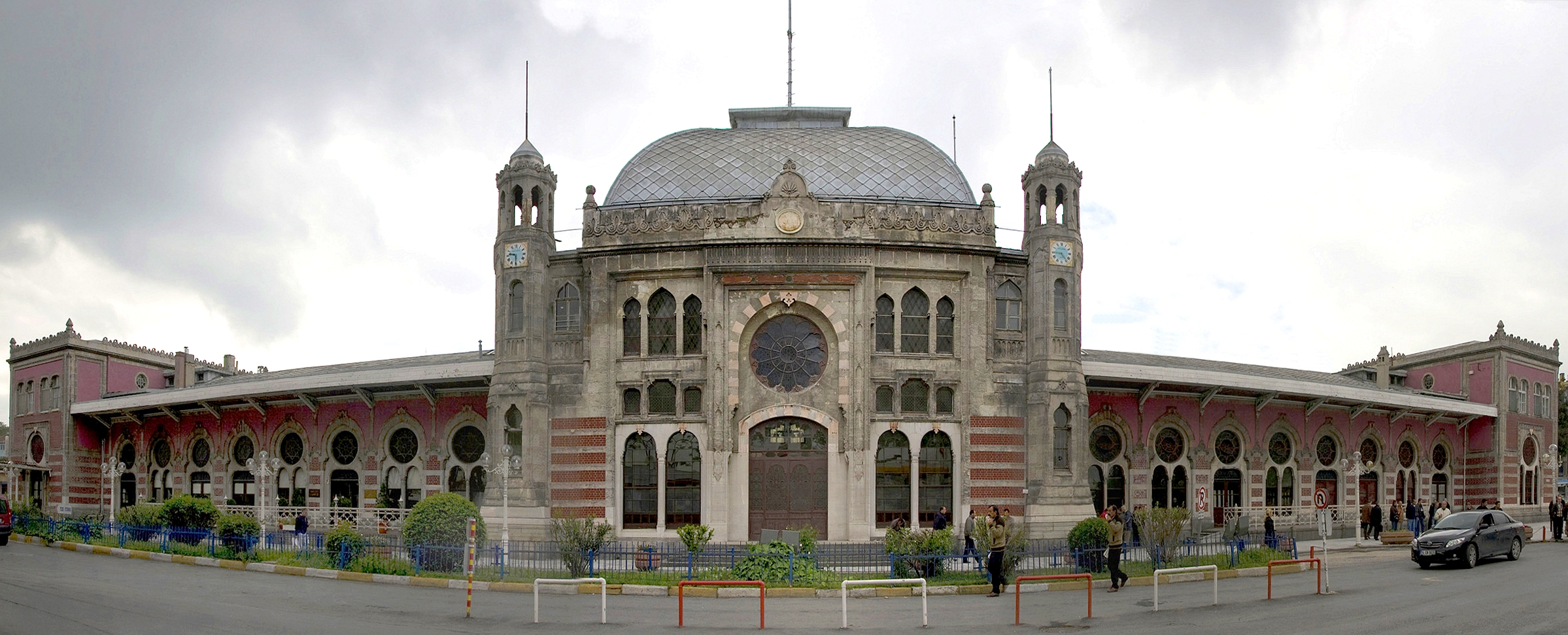
Originally opened in 1873 with a smaller terminal building as the main terminus at the Ottoman Chemins de fer Orientaux, which connected Istanbul with Vienna, the current Sirkeci Terminal building was constructed between 1888 and 1890, and became the eastern terminus of the Orient Express from Paris.

International rail service from Istanbul launched in 1889, with a line between Bucharest and Istanbul's Sirkeci Terminal, which ultimately became famous as the eastern terminus of the Orient Express from Paris. Regular service to Bucharest and Thessaloniki continued until the early 2010s, when the former was interrupted for Marmaray construction but started running again in 2019 and the latter was halted due to economic problems in Greece. After Istanbul's Haydarpaşa Terminal opened in 1908, it served as the western terminus of the Baghdad Railway and an extension of the Hejaz Railway; today, neither service is offered directly from Istanbul. Service to Ankara and other points across Turkey is normally offered by Turkish State Railways, but the construction of Marmaray and the Ankara-Istanbul high-speed railway forced the station to close in 2012. New stations to replace both the Haydarpaşa and Sirkeci terminals, and connect the city's disjointed railway networks, now the Marmaray second phase opened to the public. Private bus companies still operation to this day. Istanbul's main bus station is the largest in Europe, with a daily capacity of 15,000 buses and 600,000 passengers, serving destinations as distant as Frankfurt.

=== Airports ===
Istanbul has had three large international airports, two of which currently serve commercial passenger flights. The largest is the new Istanbul Airport, opened in 2018 in the Arnavutköy district to the northwest of the city center, on the European side, near the Black Sea coast.

All scheduled commercial passenger flights were transferred from Atatürk Airport to Istanbul Airport on 6 April 2019, following the closure of Istanbul Atatürk Airport for scheduled passenger flights. The IATA code IST was also transferred to the new airport. Once all phases are completed in 2025, the airport will have six sets of runways (eight in total), 16 taxiways, and will be able to accommodate 200 million passengers a year. The transfer from the airport to the city is via the O-7, and it will eventually be linked by two lines of the Istanbul Metro.

Sabiha Gökçen International Airport, 45 kilometers (28 mi) southeast of the city center, on the Asian side, was opened in 2001 to relieve Atatürk. Dominated by low-cost carriers, Istanbul's second airport has rapidly become popular, especially since the opening of a new international terminal in 2009; the airport handled 14.7 million passengers in 2012, a year after Airports Council International named it the world's fastest-growing airport. Atatürk had also experienced rapid growth, as its 20.6% rise in passenger traffic between 2011 and 2012 was the highest among the world's top 30 airports.

Istanbul Atatürk Airport, located 24 kilometers (15 mi) west of the city center, on the European side, near the Marmara Sea coast, was formerly the city's largest airport. After its closure to commercial flights in 2019, it was briefly used by cargo aircraft and the official state aircraft owned by the Turkish government, until the demolition of its runway began in 2020. It handled 61.3 million passengers in 2015, which made it the third-busiest airport in Europe and the 18th-busiest in the world in that year.

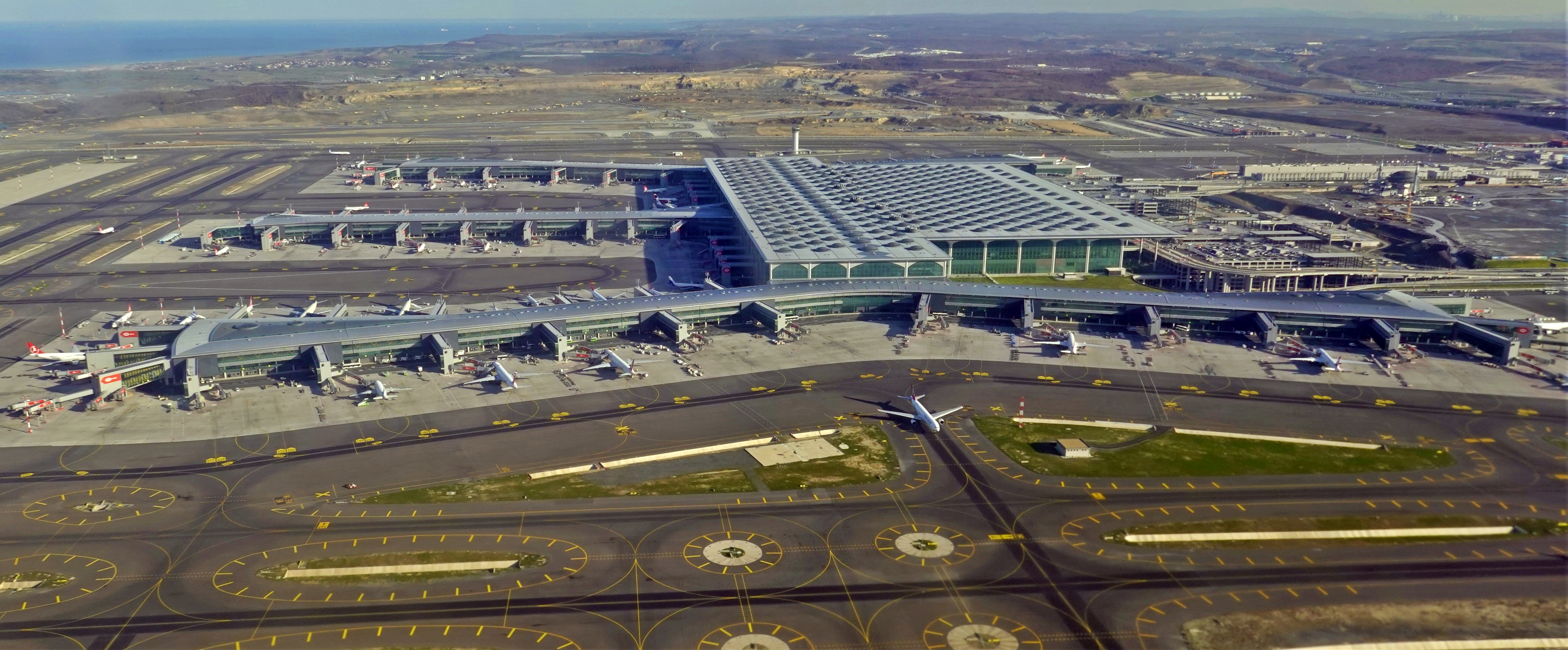
Istanbul Airport

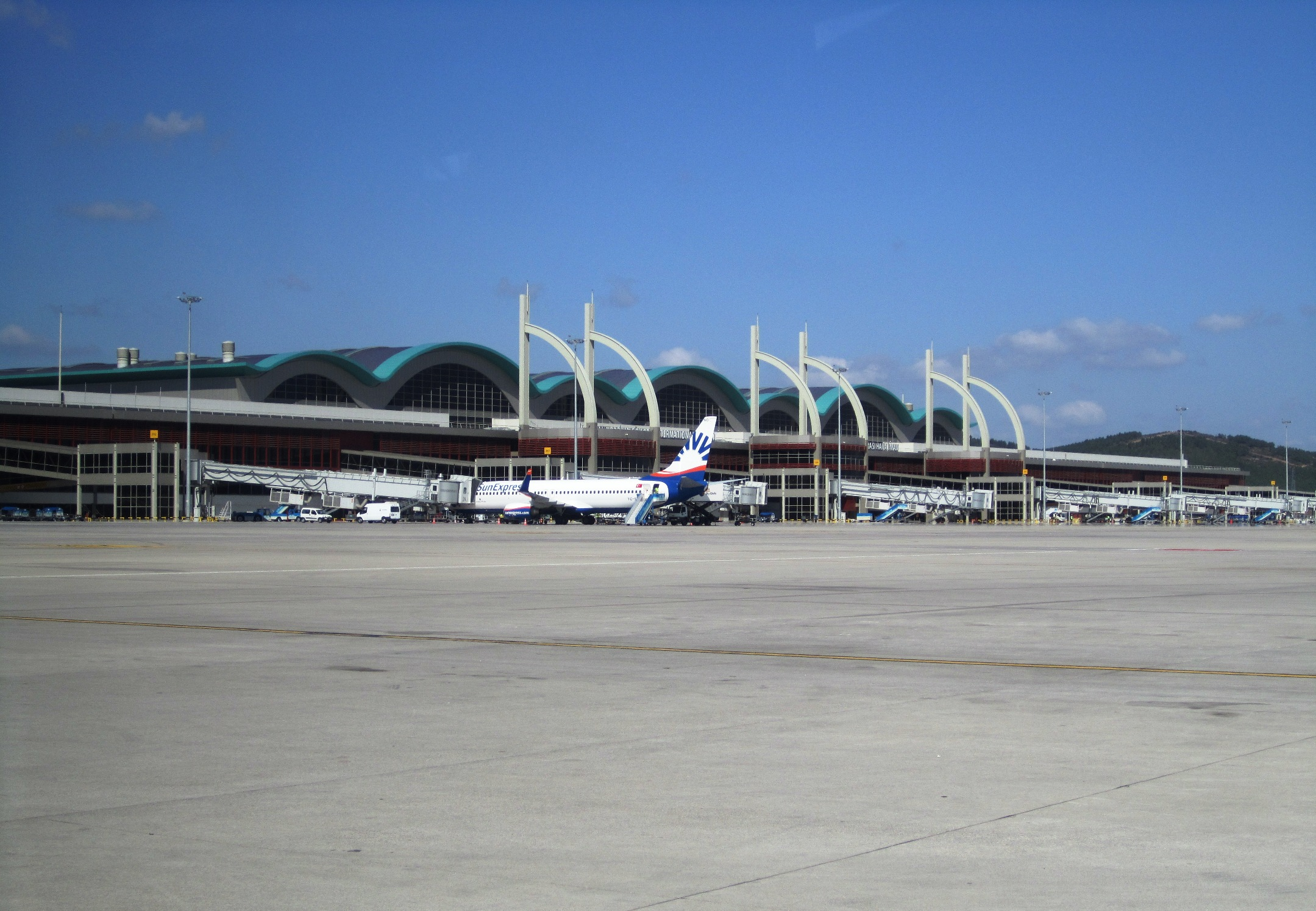
Sabiha Gökçen Airport

== See also ==
- List of people from Istanbul
- List of twin towns and sister cities of Istanbul
- Outline of Istanbul
