= Eyüp Gondola =

Istanbul cable car line

- Eyüp–Piyerloti Teleferiği
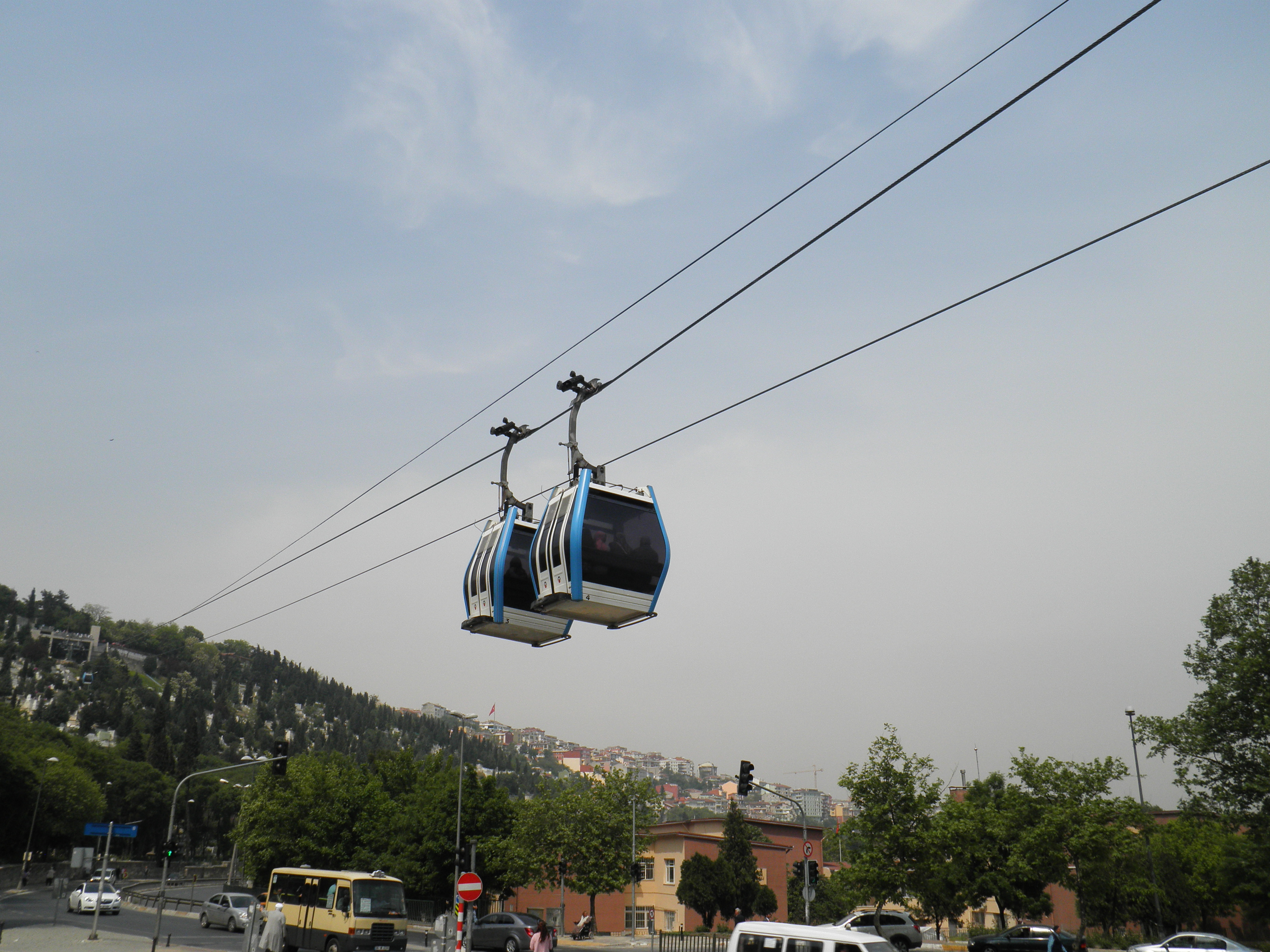
- Eyüp Gondola seen from Eyüp station

- Location within Istanbul

Overview
- Status: Operational
- Character: Recreational
- System: Public transport in Istanbul
- Line no.: TF2
- Location: Eyüp, Istanbul
- Country: Turkey
- Coordinates: 41.05017°N 28.93437°E
- Termini: Eyüp (southeast); Piyerloti (northwest)
- Elevation: lowest: 0 m (0 ft) highest: 53 m (174 ft)
- No. of stations: 2
- Services: Piyerloti
- Open: November 30, 2005; 20 years ago
- Website: www.eyup-piyerloti-aerial-cable-car

Operation
- Owner: Istanbul Metropolitan Municipality
- Operator: Istanbul Ulaşım AŞ
- No. of carriers: 4 (2 sets of 2 cabins in tandem)
- Carrier capacity: 8
- Ridership: 2,000 daily
- Operating times: 8:00–23:00 (summer season), 8:00–22:00 (winter season)
- Trips daily: 200
- Headway: 5 minutes during peak hours
- Trip duration: 2.75 min
- Fare: ₺1.95 (by Istanbulkart)

Technical features
- Aerial lift type: Mono-cable gondola fixed grip pulsed
- Manufactured by: Leitner Ropeways, Italy
- Line length: 420 m (1,380 ft)
- No. of support towers: 1
- No. of cables: 1
- Operating speed: 4 m/s (13 ft/s)

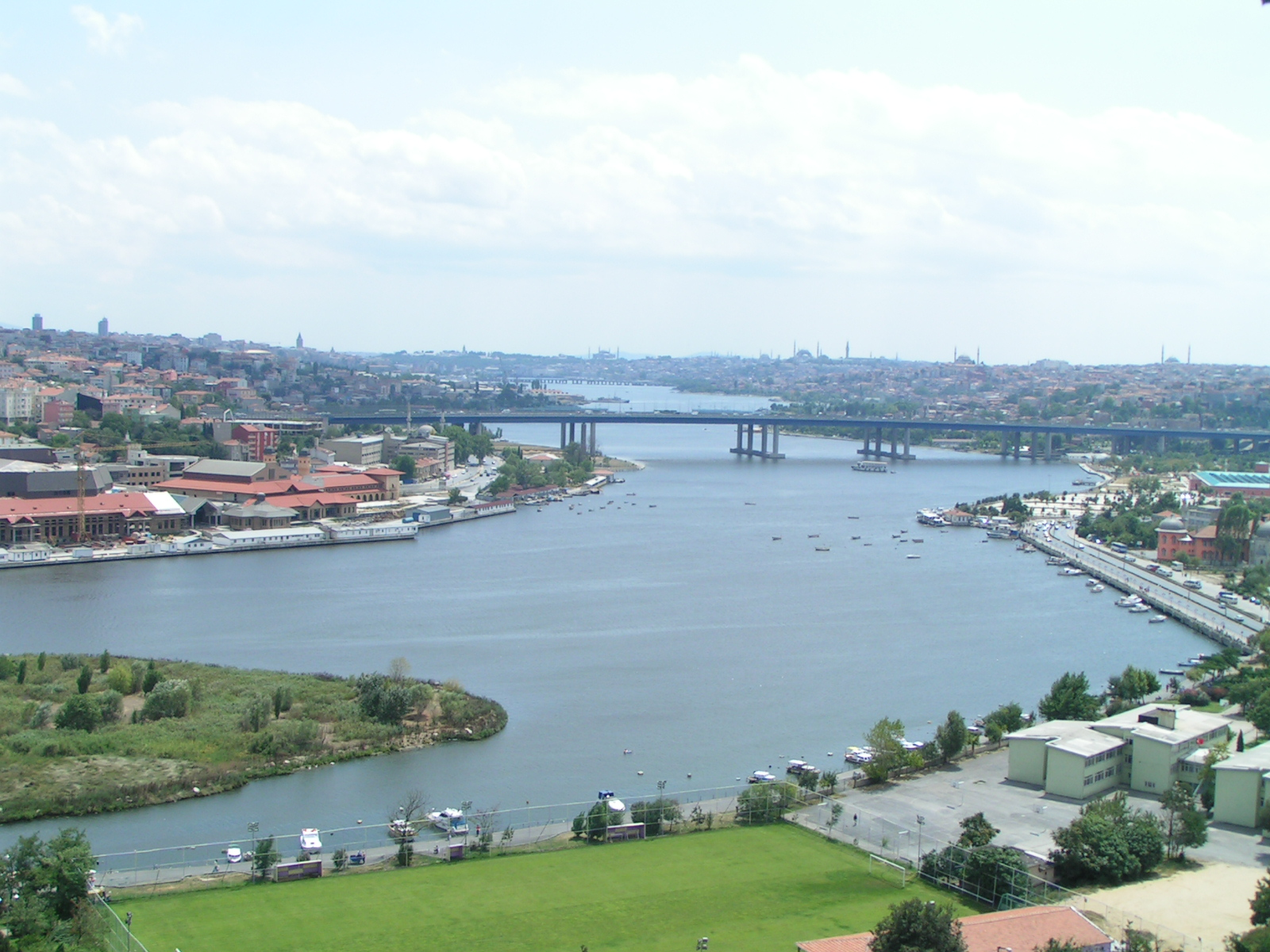
Golden Horn seen from Piyerloti.

The Eyüp Gondola, a.k.a. Eyüp–Piyerloti Aerial Cable Car, (Turkish: TF2 Eyüp–Piyerloti teleferik hattı) is a two-station gondola-type line of aerial lift passenger transport system located in Eyüp district of Istanbul, Turkey. Opened on November 30, 2005, the 420 m (1,380 ft) long line serves the Piyerloti Hill from Eyüp at the coast of Golden Horn. It is operated under the line number TF2 by Metro Istanbul. The fare is paid by the contactless smart card Istanbulkart, which is valid for all public transport in Istanbul.

== Gondola lift system ==
The line was built by the Italian company Leitner Ropeways of Leitner Group. It is a two-station overhead transport system with a single support tower in the middle of the line distance. The pulse-movement gondola (Mono-cable gondola fixed grip pulsed) system runs two sets of two fixed grip cabins in tandem, which are carried and hauled by a single rope. The two cabins slow down when approaching the terminal, and stop upon arrival at the platform. After simultaneous unloading and reloading, the cabins run back. The average line speed is 4 m/s (13 ft/s). There are two sets of two unidirectional carriers of type GFR8 each capable of eight passengers.

The base station is located on the Golden Horn coast on an area of 625 m^{2} (6,730 sq ft). The Eyüp station offers a parking lot for visitors. The return station, situated in front of the Pierre Loti Café, has an area of 250 m^{2} (2,700 sq ft).

== Safety ==
The safety system of the aerial lift line is automatically activated in case of emergency and stops the ride. Such dangerous cases are strong wind, derailing of the rope, stopping of cabin at incorrect station location and speed over limit. The failure is displayed on the control computer. In the event of a blackout, a standby generator ensures the travel of the cabins to the target station at a low speed of 1 m/s (3.3 ft/s). Various technical data regarding the status of the line such as the distance of the cabins from the stations, cabin speed, DC motor current and torque, positions of the safety switches, failure checklist, active failures and wind speed motor are available to the station operators by computers. The seats in the cabin are foldable to make place for wheelchairs.

== Specifications ==
- Line length: 384 m (1,260 ft)
- Number of stations: 2
- Number of cabins: 4 (2 sets of 2 cabins in tandem)
- Trip duration: 2.75 minutes
- Operational hours: 8:00 - 23:00 (summer season), 8:00 - 22:00 (winter season)
- Daily ridership: 4,000 passengers daily
- Number of daily trips: 200
- Frequency: 5 minutes during peak hours
- Commercial speed: 4 m/s (13 ft/s)
- Maximum load capacity per single cabin (8 persons): 650 kg
- Transportation capacity: 576 passengers hourly
- Trip duration (including departure from one station and stopping at the other): 165 seconds
- Average number of trips per hour: 18

== Stations ==
| No | Station | District | Transfer | Notes |
|---|---|---|---|---|
| 1 | Eyüp | Eyüpsultan | (Eyüp station); İETT Bus: 50B, 50R, 50K, 50V, 50Y, 86V, TM14 | Eyüp Sultan Mosque・Eyüp Sultan Cemetery --- Approximately 450 meters walking distance to Eyüpsultan Pier. |
| 2 | Piyer Loti | Eyüpsultan | İETT Bus: | Pierre Loti Hill |

== Piyerloti Hill ==
The gondola line was built to provide easy access for local and foreign tourists to the Piyerloti Hill by avoiding a walk through the big Eyüp Cemetery on a hillside. At 53 m (174 ft) altitude, the Piyerloti Hill is named after the French naval officer, novelist and Orientalist Pierre Loti (1850–1923), who used to visit the site during his time in Istanbul. The historic Rabia Kadın Café on the top of the hill, at which he used to drink Turkish coffee, was later renamed also after him. Another establishment on the hill, of which name recalls him, is a restaurant named after his novel Aziyadé, which is the name of the main character as an Ottoman woman. There are six historic mansions on the hill, which were restored in 2000 and converted into hotels having 130-bed capacity in 68 rooms in total. There is a coin-operated telescope on the observation deck at the Piyerloti station.

== See also ==
- List of gondola lifts in Turkey
