= Public transport in Istanbul =

Public transport network

Istanbul rail & Metrobus (Bus Rapid Transit) transit network

Public transport in Istanbul comprises a bus network, various rail systems, funiculars, and maritime services to serve more than 15 million inhabitants of Istanbul, a city spread over an area of 5,712 km^{2} (2,205 sq mi), as well as tourists.

== History ==
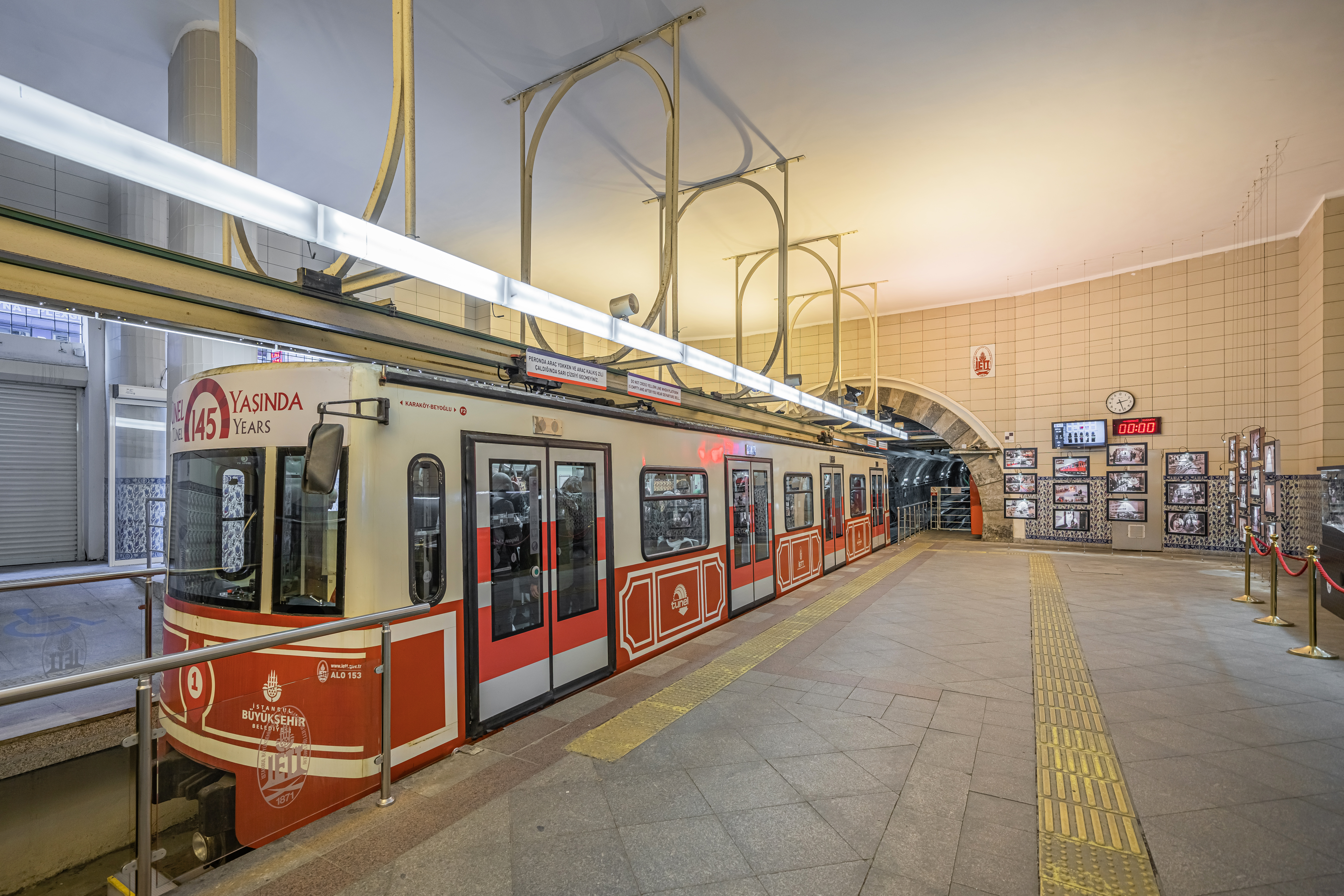
The Tünel was inaugurated on January 17, 1875, making it the second-oldest underground urban railway in the world after the London Underground which opened on January 10, 1863. It was originally powered by two 150 HP steam-power plants. Wagons were lit up with gas lamps due to the lack of electric power in that period.

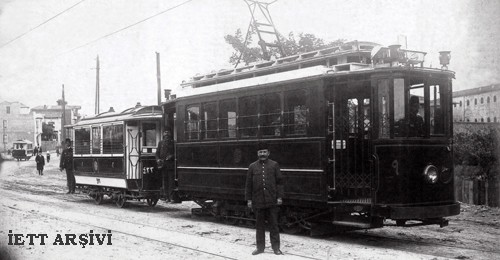
Ottoman era image of an electric powered tram in Istanbul

Public road transport in Istanbul dates back to 30 August 1869, when a contract to build a tram system in the capital of the Ottoman Empire was signed. With this agreement, Konstantin Krepano Efendi's "Société des Tramways de Constantinople" obtained the concession to operate public transportation for forty years. The inauguration of four lines of horse-driven trams was in 1871. In the first year, the horsecars transported 4.5 million people on the lines Azapkapı-Galata, Aksaray-Yedikule, Aksaray-Topkapı and Eminönü-Aksaray. More lines were added in the following years. 430 horses were used to draw the 45 carriages, including 15 summer-type and some double-deckers, on 1,000 mm (3 ft 3 3/8 in) metre gauge track. In 1912, the horse-drawn tram had to cease to operate for one year because the Ministry of Defence sent all the horses to the front during the Balkan War.

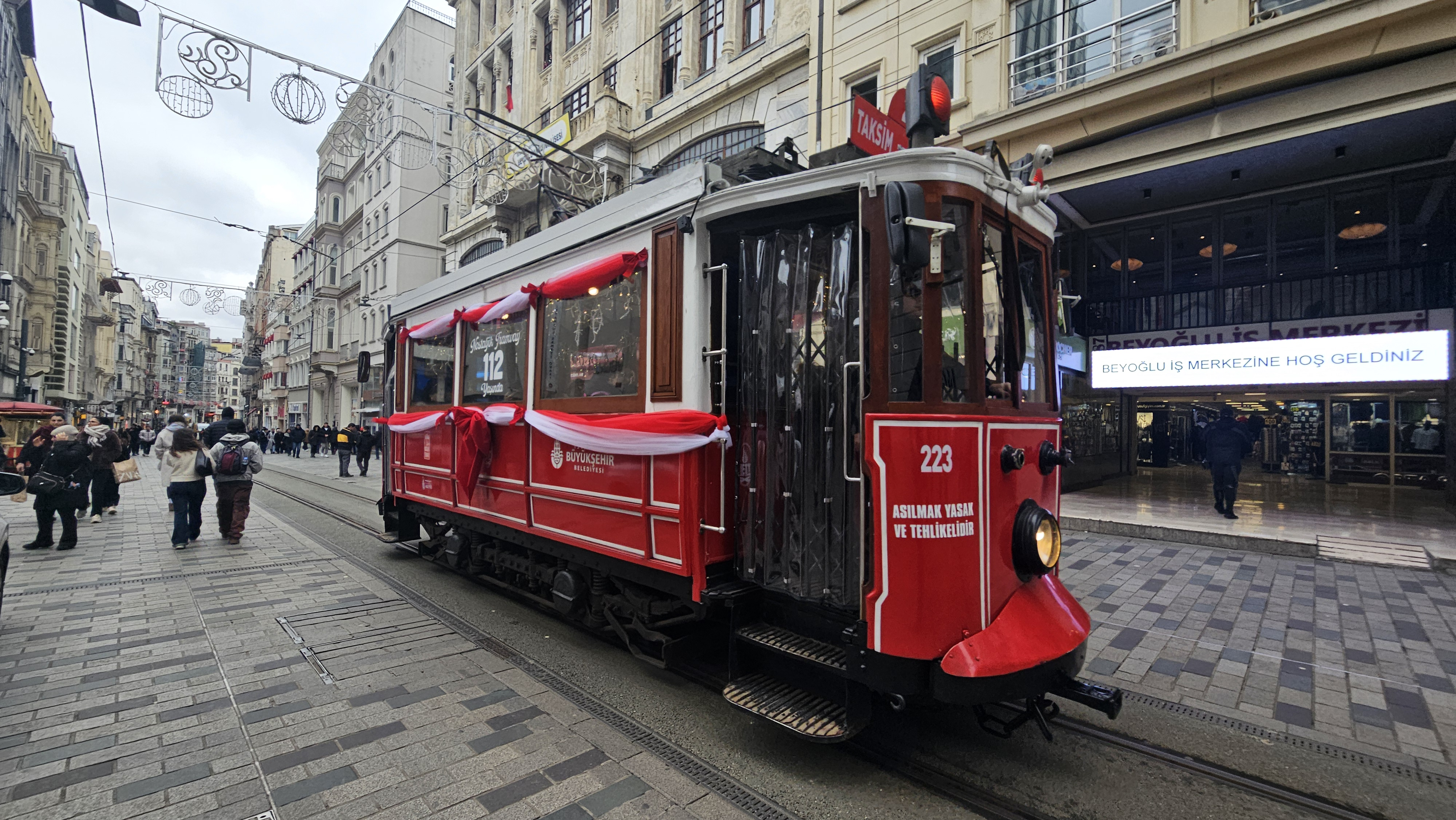
A nostalgic tram on İstiklal Avenue, decorated for the 112th anniversary of Istanbul's electric powered tram service which began in 1914, replacing the horse-drawn tram service between 1872 and 1914.

The tram network was electrified by overhead contact wire on 2 February 1914. The tram began to run on the Anatolian part of Istanbul on 8 June 1928 between Üsküdar and Kısıklı. By the 1950s, the length of the tram lines reached 130 km (81 mi). The trams were on service on the European side of the city until 12 August 1961 and on the Asian side until 14 November 1966.

The same time as the horsecar started to run, construction of the Tünel, a short funicular between Pera and Galata, began on 30 July 1871. The funicular opened to service on 5 December 1874. In the beginning, only freight and livestock were transported. On 17 January 1875, after completing the test runs, the funicular was opened to the public. It is still in service.

A commuter rail line was built on the European side of the city from Sirkeci to Hadımköy in 1872, which was followed in 1873 on the Anatolian part from Haydarpaşa Terminal to İzmit.

The ferry is one of the oldest means of transit in Istanbul, a city with two parts separated by the Bosphorus strait and surrounded by sea. In 1837, British and Russian owned boats started transport on the Bosphorus. The Istanbul Maritime Company was established in 1851 by a decree of Ottoman Sultan Abdülmecid I. The ferry service began in 1853 with six paddle steamers built in the Robert White shipyard in England. The service was extended in 1859 to places around Golden Horn. After 1903 screw-driven steamboats were put in service. Until 1929 boats were imported; later on the ferries were built in the shipyards in Golden Horn. At its peak the fleet contained 40 boats. In 1867, the same company started vehicle transport across the Boğaziçi (Bosphorus) between Kabataş and Üsküdar with two ferries purchased from England, as the first scheduled ferry lines in the world. All ferry companies were nationalized in 1945.

Bus transportation in Istanbul started in 1926 with four Renault-Scania buses between Beyazıt and Karaköy. The fleet grew up from 9 buses in 1942 to 16 in 1955 and to 525 buses in 1960, and then became the backbone of public transport in an ever-enlarging city.

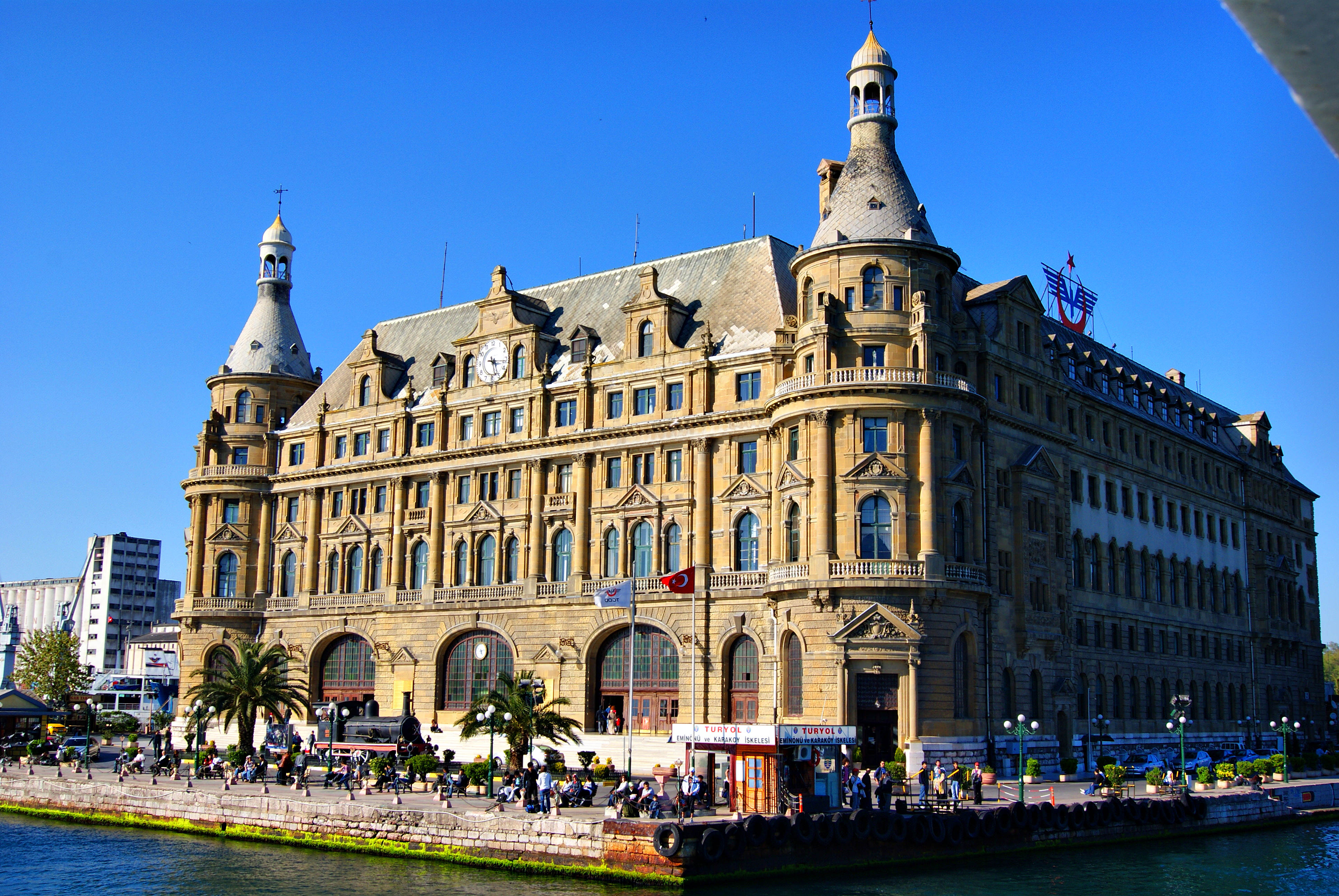
Haydarpaşa railway station (1909) in the Kadıköy district on the Asian side of Istanbul

Several British and French companies operated all public transport in Istanbul until 16 June 1939, the date of nationalization. The newly established company İETT (Istanbul Electric Tram and Tünel Company) took over from then on the task of public transport in Istanbul.

On 27 May 1961 (other sources say 1962), trolleybuses were put into service on several routes, as part of programme to replace all trams. However, the Istanbul trolleybus system closed in 1984, and most of the fleet was sold for further use on the İzmir trolleybus system.

In 1988, a company called Ulaşım A.Ş. (Transport Inc.) was established to run the services of LRT (light rail transit) (since 1989), Metro (since 2000) and modern trams (since 1992) by the Municipality of Istanbul. The company is still active and will be the operator of the new rail lines.

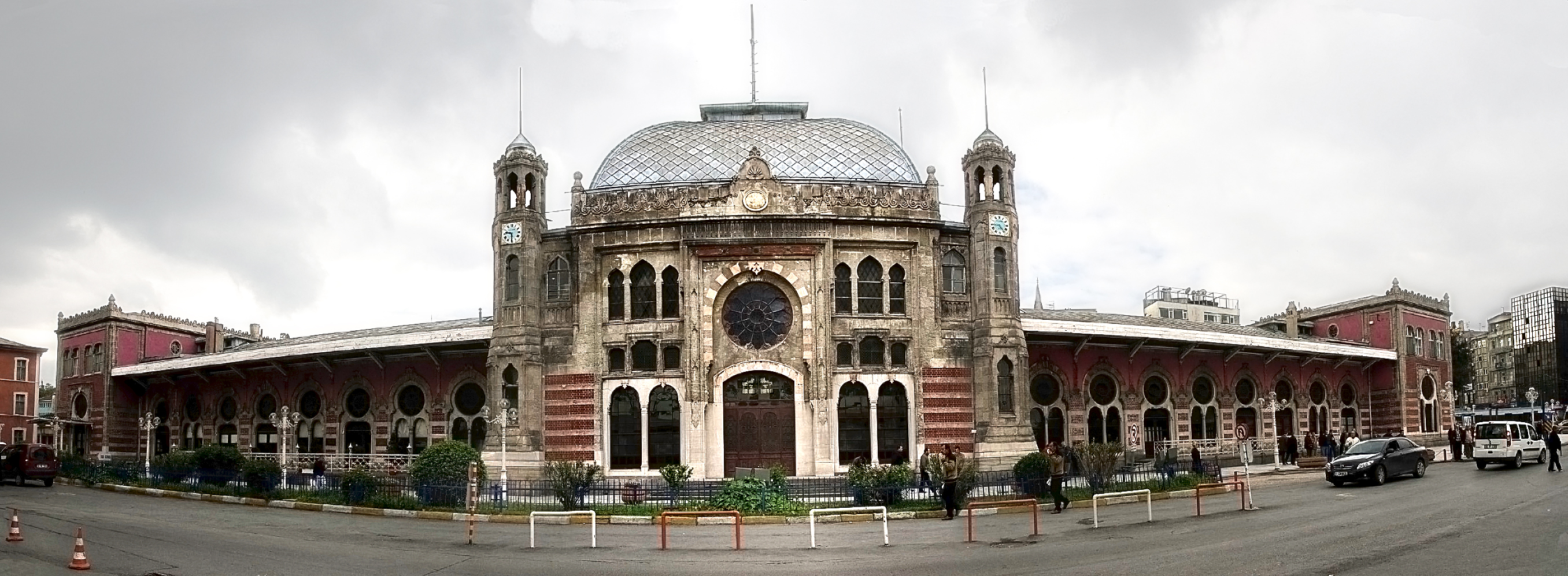
Sirkeci railway station in the Sirkeci quarter on the European side of Istanbul was the eastern terminus of the famous Orient Express which operated between Paris and Istanbul from 1883 to 2009. Designed by German architect August Jasmund, the current terminal building was constructed between 1888 and 1890.

== Transportation today ==
=== Metro ===
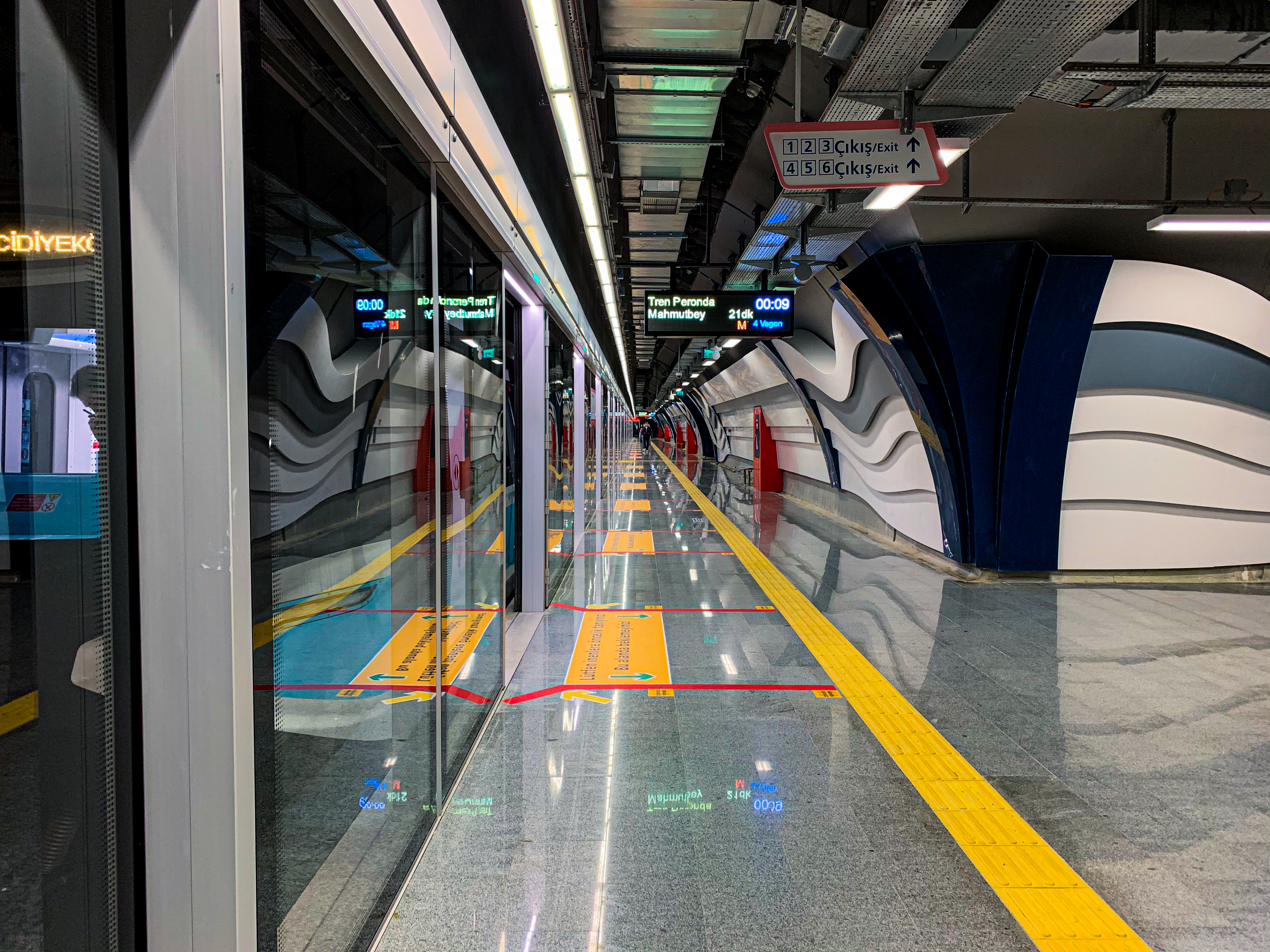
Mecidiyeköy M7 station of the Istanbul Metro

The first line (M1) began service on 3 September 1989 between Aksaray and Kocatepe. The line was further developed step-by-step and reached Atatürk Airport on 20 December 2002. The line has 18 stations and is 19.6 kilometres (12.2 mi) long. As of 2012, daily ridership was 416 journey and 210,000 passengers. Even if it is numbered as the first line, actually the line is a LRT system with many common characteristics with the T4 line, including the rolling stock, although they are categorized differently by the operator.

The construction of the underground railway in Istanbul began in 1992. The first line (M2) between Taksim and 4th Levent went into service on September 16, 2000. This line is 8.5 km long and has 6 stations, which all look similar but are in different colours.

A northern extension from 4th Levent to Atatürk Oto Sanayi station in Maslak (ITÜ/Ayazağa) entered service in 2009, as well as a southern extension from Taksim to Şişhane station in Beyoğlu, near the northern entrance of Tünel. The last northern extension for the short term, Hacı Osman was opened in 2011. The southern extension of M2 from Şişhane to Yenikapı over the new Golden Horn Bridge was opened in 2013 permitting the line to reach the Yenikapı Transfer Center. Finally the Airport (M1A) and Bağcılar (M1B) lines' eastern terminus was extended from Aksaray to this transfer center in 2014.

The M3 line runs from Kirazlı station on the M1 line to the northern Başakşehir district. It opened on 14 June 2013. A northern extension to Kayaşehir Merkez was opened on 8 April 2023.

M6 is a line branching off the M2 from the Levent station running east towards Hisarüstü and Boğaziçi University. It opened on 19 April 2015.

On the Asian side, 33.5 km (20.8 mi) long M4 line opened on 17 August 2012 up to Kartal. The line will have a total of 25 stations when the third section as far as Tuzla opens.

There is also M5, which links Üsküdar, Ümraniye Çekmeköy, Sancaktepe, and Sultanbeyli.

Currently there are 124 Hyundai-Rotem (M2) and 120 CAF (M4) trains in service, with a trip along the entire line taking 27 (M2) and 52 (M4) minutes.

All lines are operated by Metro Istanbul (the new name of Istanbul Ulaşım A.Ş.) which belongs to the Municipality of Istanbul.

=== Tram ===
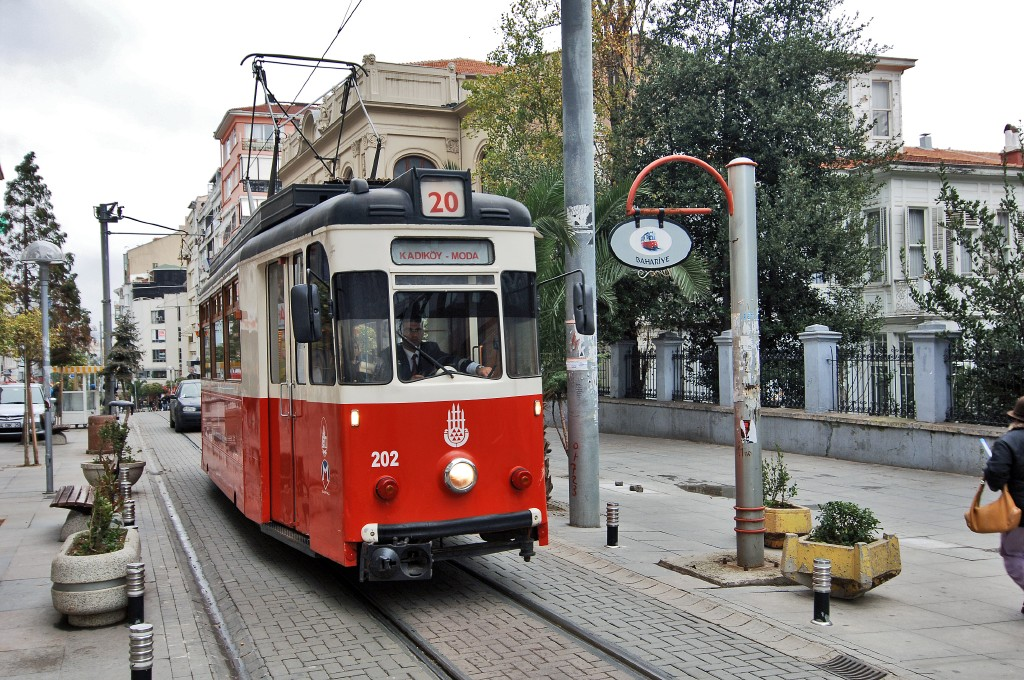

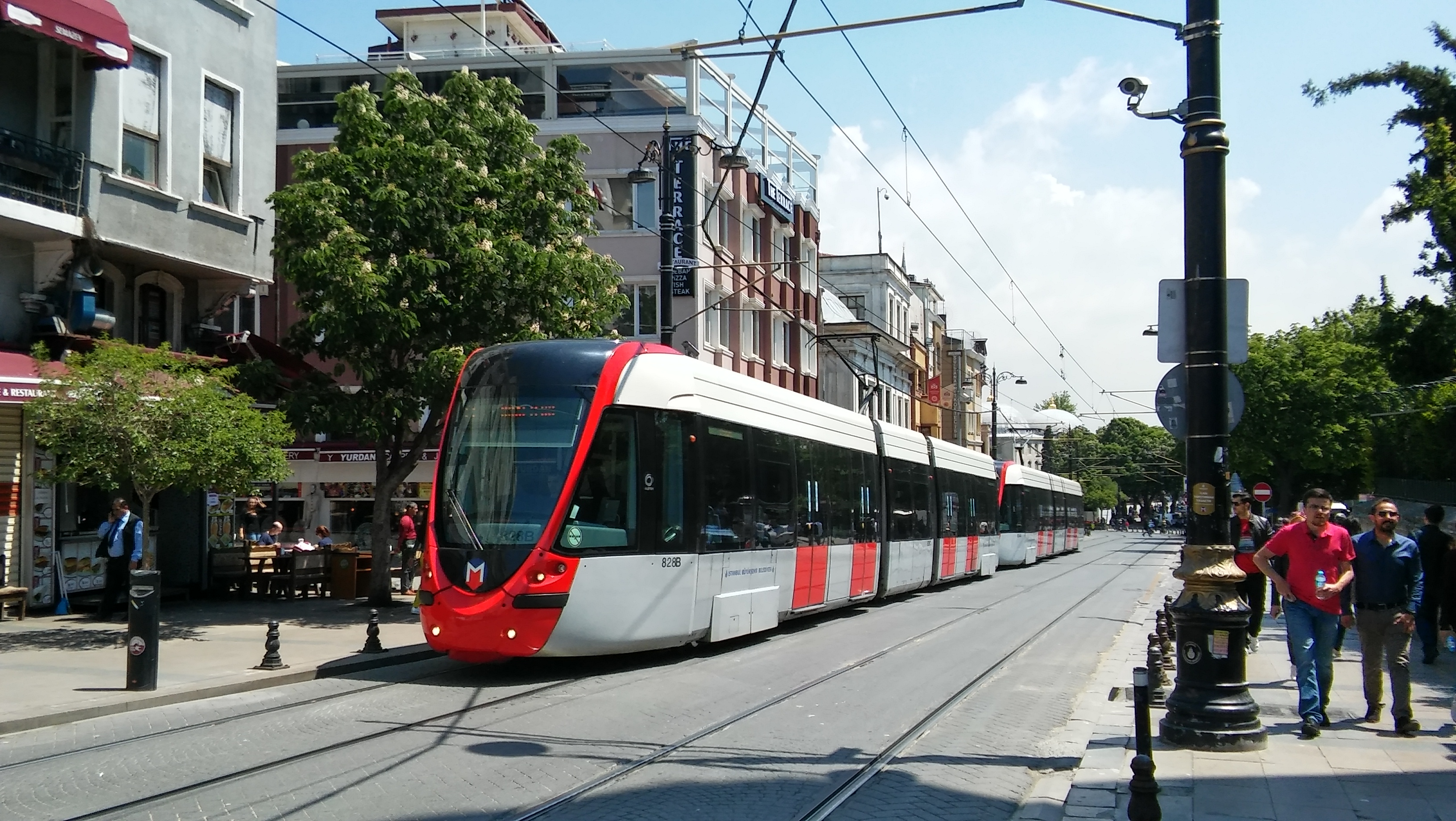
Nostalgic tram and modern tram systems of Istanbul

Istanbul inaugurated horse-drawn trams in 1872 and these remained in service until 1914, when they were replaced by electric powered trams. Electric trams remained the main means for urban public transport until 1966. Many routes were built step by step, and the network reached its maximum extent in 1956, with 108 million passengers transported by 270 trams running on 56 lines. Tramcars were not modernized for many decades, and some of the original electric cars from 1914 were still running in the 1960s. At that time, modern buses provided faster and more comfortable journeys. Because of these unresolved problems, the tram system stopped operating in 1966.

From the early 1970s, traffic congestion worsened. By the mid-1980s, Istanbulites realized that the uncontrolled extension of motorization & closure of the tram network had been a mistake. Other cities around the world, e.g. Tunis and Buenos Aires, also understood that error, and like them, Istanbul also planned the return of the tramway.

As an experiment, Istanbul first opened a heritage tram at European side in 1990. Due to increasing popularity, they opened a modern tram system starting in 1992, also at European side. Now, the Asian side has a heritage tram system, whereas the European side has both a heritage tram and a modern tram system.

The modern tram consists of lines T1, T4, T5 and T6, initially operated with 55 low-floor Bombardier Flexity Swift and 32 Alstom Citadis. The line T4 was opened in 2007 between Edirnekapı and Mescid-i Selam. There are 22 stations and length is 15,3 km. Since March 2009, the line works between Topkapı and Mescid-i Selam. Service is operated with LRT vehicles built by SGP in 1989. As of 2019, daily ridership was 446 journeys and 196,000 passengers.

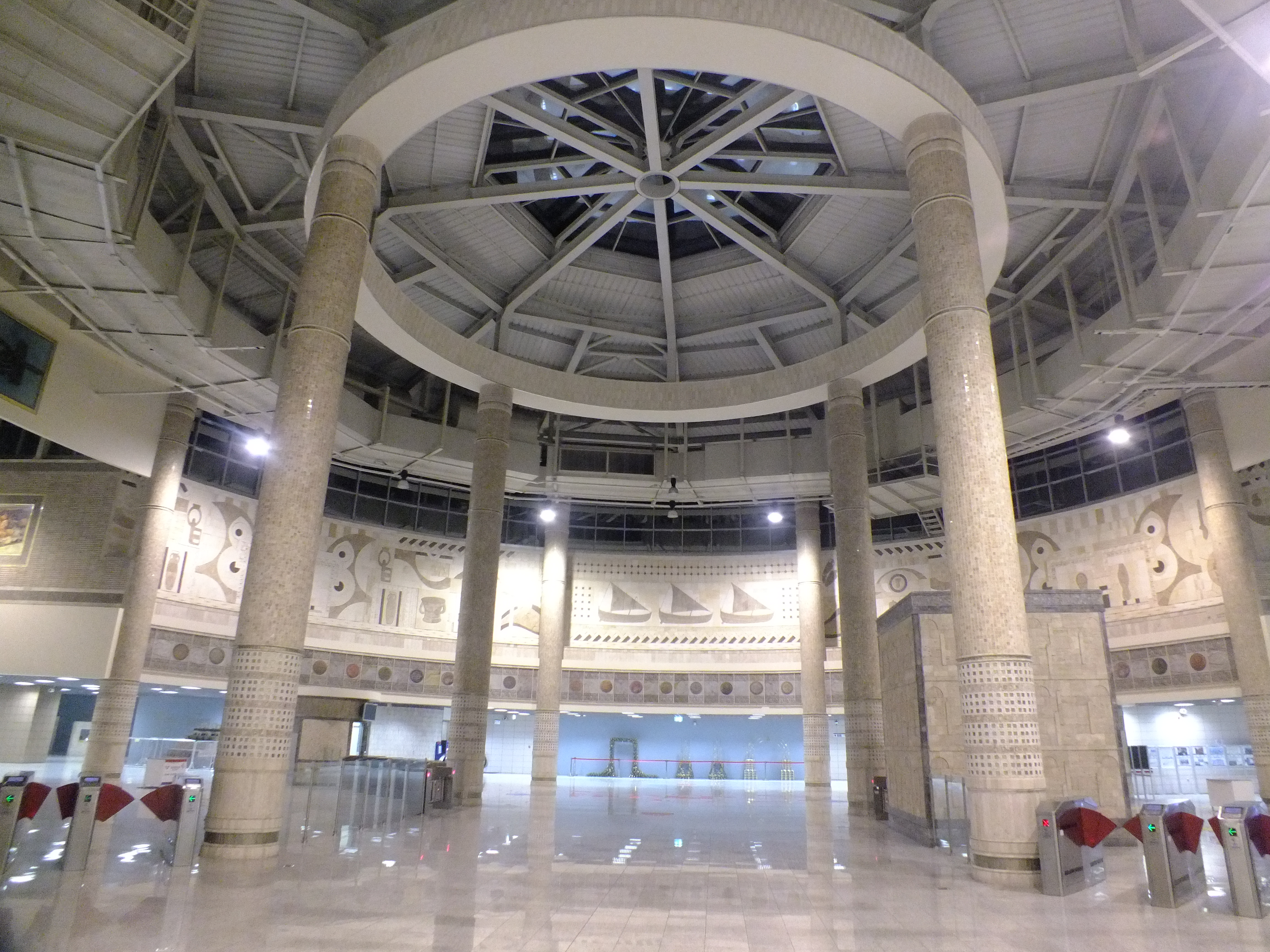
The Yenikapı Transfer Center where transfer between Marmaray and the metro is possible

=== Commuter rail ===
Starting from June 2013, suburban lines on both sides of the city (Istanbul suburban and Haydarpaşa suburban) were closed for rehabilitation works as well as for their fusion into a single line by the means of an undersea tunnel through the Bosphorus as part of the Marmaray project.

On 12 March 2019, all parts of the Marmaray were opened. A further extension to Bahçeşehir via Ispartakule is operated as a shuttle from Halkalı station.

=== Funicular ===
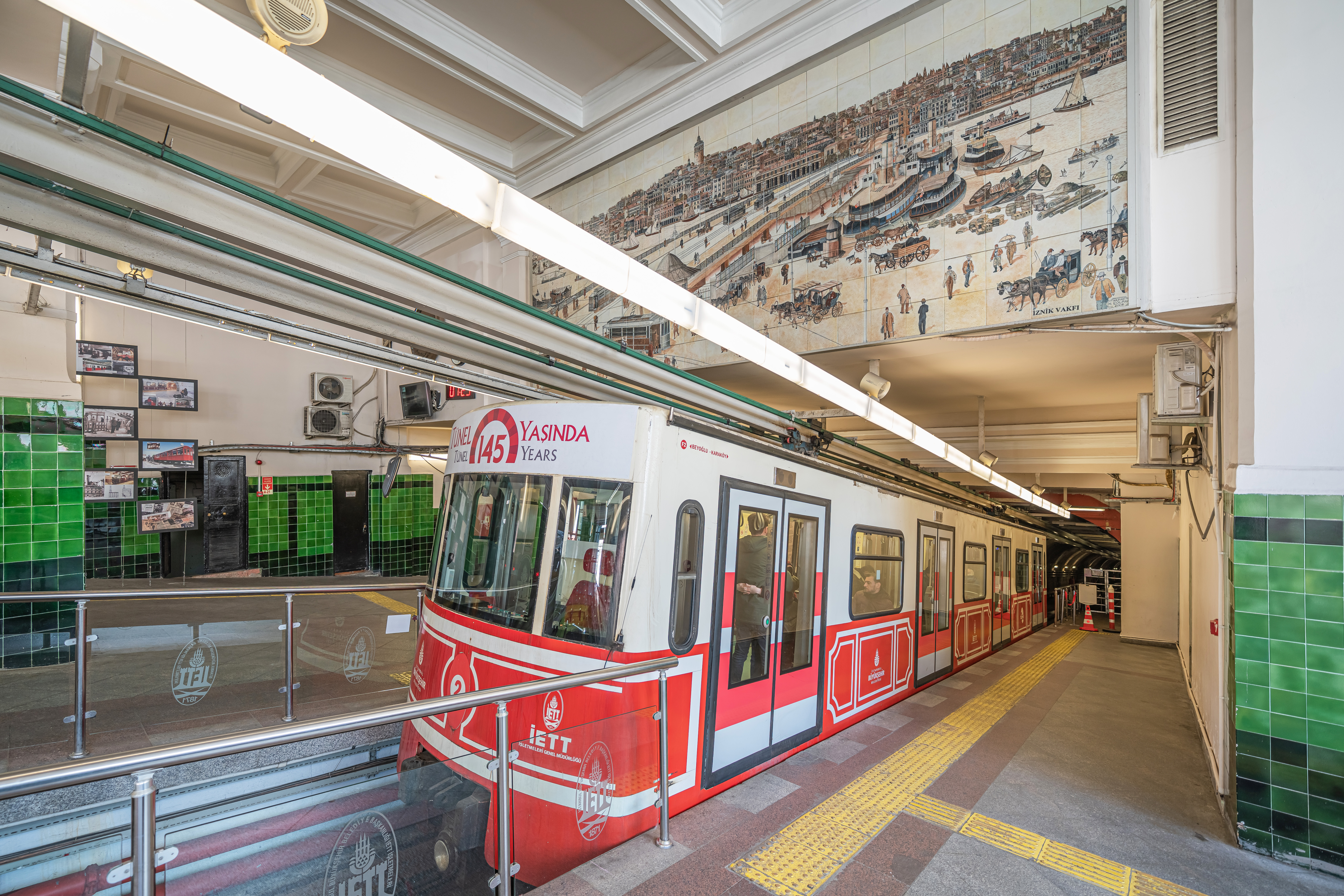
Operated by İETT, the Tünel (1875) in Istanbul was the first underground railway line in continental Europe, and the second subterranean railway line in the world after London's Underground (1863)

Istanbul is served by three underground funicular railways, of very different ages and styles.

The older of these lines is the Tünel. This line is the oldest underground metro line in continental Europe, and the second in the world after London. The Tünel is 573 m long with an altitude difference of 60 m and no intermediate stations between Karaköy and Tünel Square. It has been continuously in service since 1875. It was originally steam-powered with two wooden trains serving parallel tracks. It was modernized in 1971. Today the line is single-track with a passing loop, electrically powered and runs on rubber tyres with rebuilt ex-RATP MP 55 vehicles. A trip takes approximately 1.5 minutes. About 15,000 people use the line each day. Unlike the modern one below which runs at strictly five-minute intervals, this one has a less regular schedule.

Opened in June 2006, a second modern funicular line, the Kabataş-Taksim Funicular, is operated by Ulaşım A.Ş. and connects the Seabus port and tram stop of Kabataş with the metro station at Taksim Square. It is about 600 meters long and climbs approximately 60 meters in 110 seconds.

In October 2022 the newest funicular line the F4 (Istanbul Metro) Boğaziçi Üni./Hisarüstü-Aşiyan funicular line opened and operated by Ulaşım A.Ş. It connects with M6 (Istanbul Metro) line at Boğaziçi University.

=== Bus rapid transit (BRT) ===
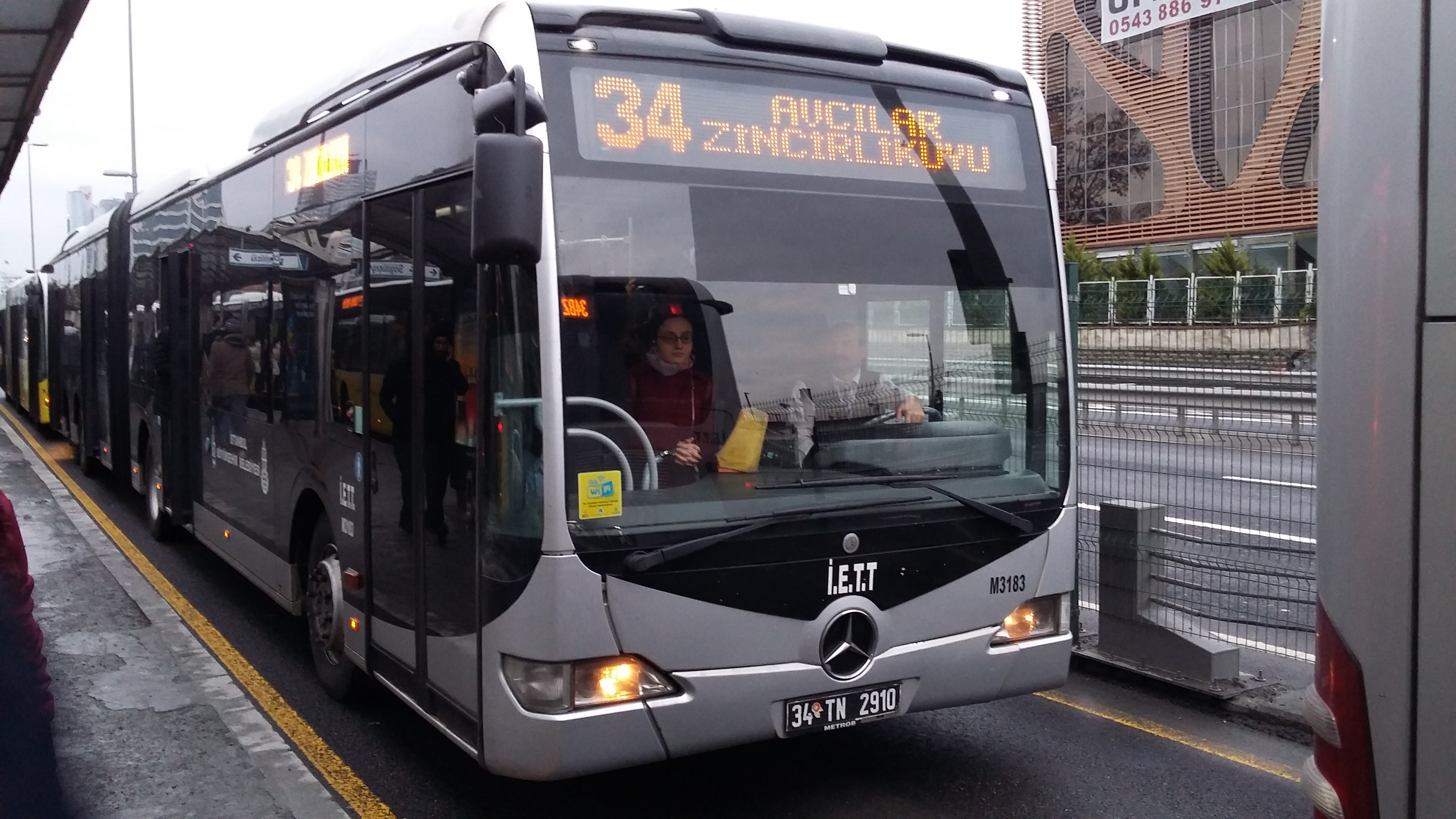
Metrobüs BRT in Istanbul

The bus rapid transit (BRT) system in Istanbul is called Metrobüs. The construction of the Metrobüs BRT line began in 2005. The first line runs between Avcılar and Söğütlüçeşme. This line is 41.5 km long and has 35 stations, which are located on Istanbul's Main Highway, called the D 100. As of 2011 it was operated with Mercedes-Benz CapaCity, Mercedes-Benz Conecto, Akia Ultra LF25, and Otokar Kent XL. Ridership is 715.000 passengers per day.

An extension to Beylikdüzü opened in 2012.

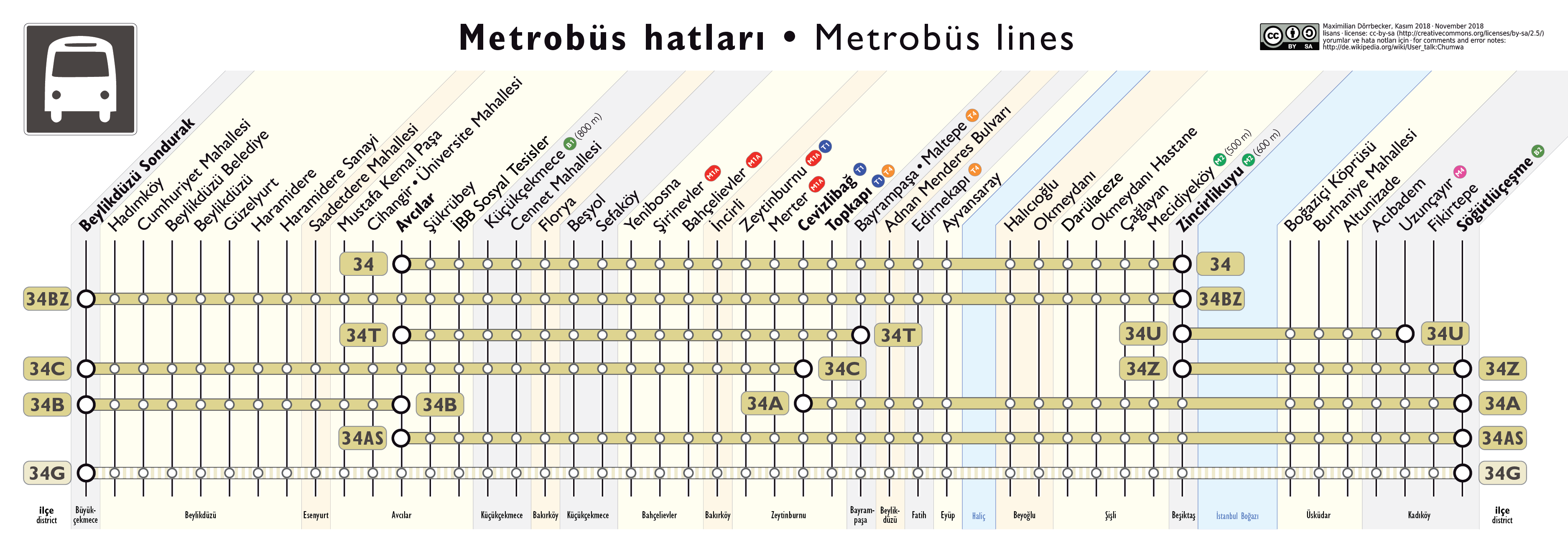
Metrobüs lines in Istanbul

Brand	Model	Capacity	Piece	Fleet Code
Mercedes-Benz	Capacity	193	249	M3001-M3250
Mercedes-Benz	Conecto	160	217	M4501-M4765/M4801-M4926
Otokar	Kent XL	220	120	O5001-O5120
Akia	Ultra LF 25	289	106	A5001-A5107

=== Bus system ===
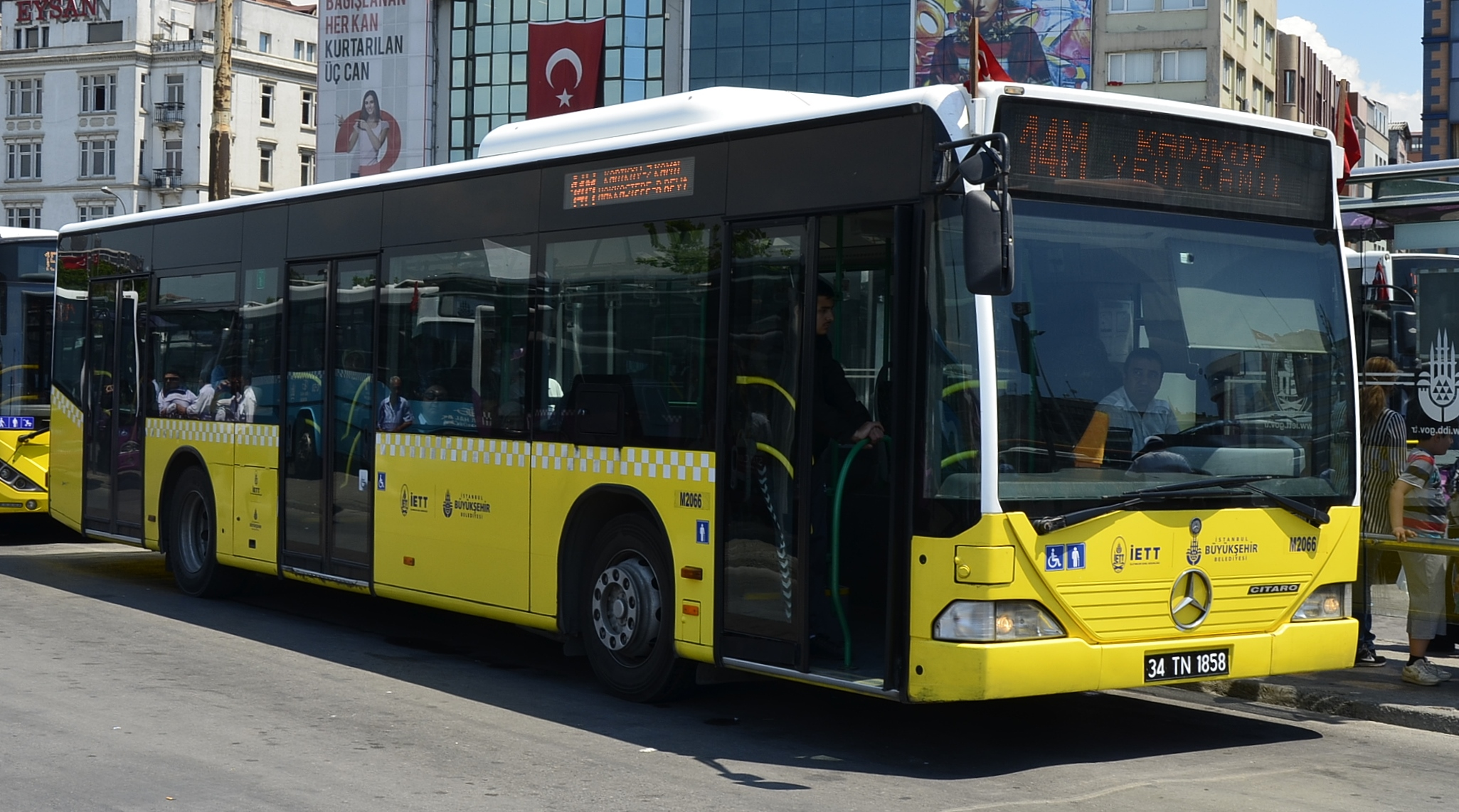
A Mercedes-Benz Citaro of the İETT with the new livery

The bus fleet has a total of 4,012 vehicles built by MAN, Ikarus, Mercedes-Benz, BMC, Phileas, Otokar, Temsa and Güleryüz. In 2012 the daily ridership was 3,621,908 passengers, representing 30% of the city's total daily transportation.

Since 1985, privately owned ÖHO (Özel Halk Otobüsü - Private Public Bus) buses have been allowed to operate under the authority of İETT. There are 2,157 private owned public buses, including 144 double-deckers. There are 783 bus lines excluding diversions as of May 21, 2018. Many routes have diversions running one roundtrip a day on average, which usually feed less developed suburbs around frequent routes. Some routes also provide short turning services at peak hours for crowded stops. Those diversions are listed under the same headsign reference as main route. Buses running diversion routes do not display route numbers, spelling out the route on the headsign in detail instead. In 2010, the municipality decided to found a new company called Otobüs A.Ş. (Bus Inc.) in order to more quickly replace old vehicles. Otobüs A.Ş. had a fleet of 544 vehicles as of December 2012. The vehicles are fully low floor and certified to Euro 5 standards. In 2014, IETT carried 1.31 billion ticketed passengers, a record for a Turkish transport system. İETT is currently trialling outsourcing the drivers and maintenance into private bus company Akkurtlar. Outsourced drivers can be distinguished by their uniforms.

Brand	Model	Production Years	Type	Quantity	Fleet Code
Akia	Ultra LF25	2021	Double Articulated	106	A5001-A5107
BMC	Procity	2012	Solo	4	B3001-B3004
BMC	Procity	2016	Solo	44	B4001-B4044
BMC	Procity TR	2017	Solo	381	B5001-B5381
Karsan BM	Avancity +CNG	2013	Solo	239	K1001-K1248
Karsan BM	Avancity S	2013	Articulated	299	K1501-K1810
Mercedes-Benz	Citaro	2006-2007	Solo	392	M2001-M2394
Mercedes-Benz	Citaro G	2006	Articulated	99	M2501-M2600
Mercedes-Benz	CapaCity	2007-2008-2009	Articulated	249	M3001-M3250
Mercedes-Benz	Conecto G	2012	Articulated	265	M4501-M4765
Mercedes-Benz	Conecto G	2015	Articulated	126	M4801-M4926
Mercedes-Benz	Conecto	* 2012	Solo	13	M4001-M4013
Otokar	Kent 290 LF	2013	Solo	898	O1001-O1306/O2001-O2306/O3001-O3303
Otokar	Kent 290 LF	* 2012	Solo	23	O4001-O4023
Otokar	Otokar Kent XL	2021	Articulated	120	O5001-O5120
Otokar	Kent LF	* 2023	Solo	8	O4101-O4108
Temsa	Temsa Avenue	* 2014	Solo	107	T1001-T1108
Total				3373	

=== Bus Depots ===
Depot	District	Type
Anatolian Side
Anadolu	Ataşehir	City service
Hasanpaşa Şehit Ahmet Dokuyucu	Kadıköy	Metrobüs
Kurtköy	Pendik	City service
Samandıra Parklanma	Sancaktepe	City service
Sarıgazi	Sancaktepe	City service
Şahinkaya	Beykoz	City service
Yunus	Kartal	City service
European Side
Avcılar Merkez Kampüsü	Avcılar	Metrobüs
Beylikdüzü	Beylikdüzü	Metrobüs
Cebeci	Sultangazi	City service
Edirnekapı	Eyüpsultan	Metrobüs
İkitelli	Küçükçekmece	City service
Kağıthane	Kağıthane	City service
Topkapı	Fatih	City service

=== Ferries ===
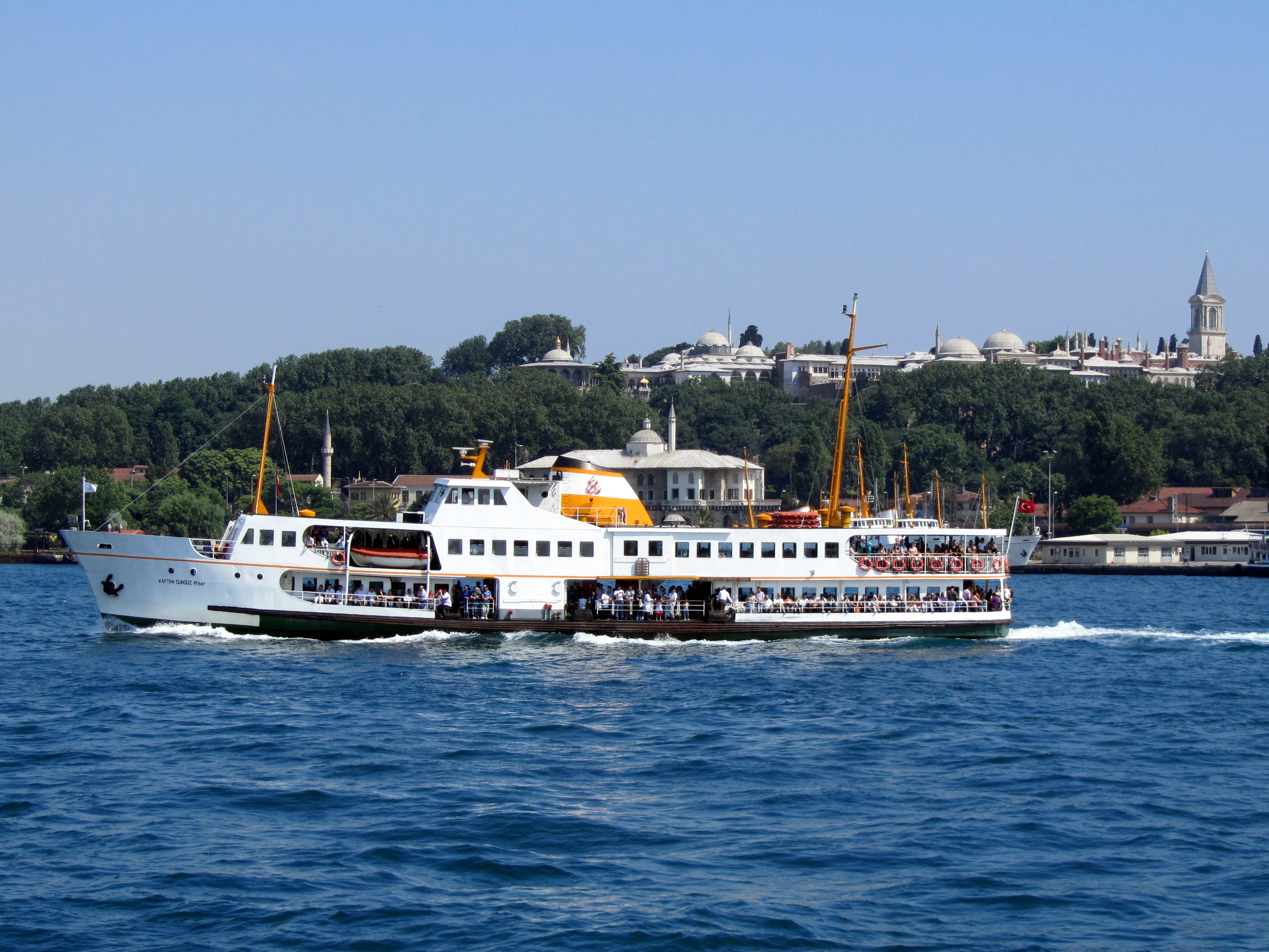
The Kaptan Gündüz Aybay Şehir Hatları ferry on the Bosphorus

Today, there are three main ferry operators in İstanbul: the municipally owned Şehir Hatları ("City Lines"), which operates traditional vapur ferries; the privately operated İstanbul Deniz Otobüsleri (İDO) ("İstanbul Sea Buses"), which operates high-speed urban and intercity services, and the privately-owned Turyol which operates mostly urban services.

Şehir Hatları ferries sail on 32 lines serving 53 piers on the shores of the Bosphorus as well as the Princes' Islands. The 30 ferries of the Şehir Hatları carried 40 million passengers in 2023.

The first steam ferries appeared on the Bosphorus in 1837 and were operated by private sector companies. On 1 January 1851, the Şirket-i Hayriye (literally “The Goodwill Company”, as the Istanbul Ferry Company was originally called) was established by the Ottoman state. The Şirket-i Hayriye, renamed Şehir Hatları in the early republican period, continued to operate the city's commuter ferries until 1937, when they under the direction of the state-owned Türkiye Denizcilik İşletmeleri (TDİ) ("Turkish Maritime Lines "). The TDİ was largely privatized in the early 2000s and ownership of the Şehir Hatları was transferred to the İstanbul Metropolitan Municipality in March 2006. In 2017, the municipality established a system for musicians to play live music for passengers in the lower salons of most ferry lines.

The design of the Istanbul vapur ferries have largely been influenced by the Fairfield Shipbuilders of Glasgow, Scotland, which have built the largest number of Istanbul ferries since 1851. The companies which have designed and built the early commuter ferries of Istanbul include the White Shipbuilders of East Cowes, England (models of 1854–1860); the M. Wigram Shipbuilders of London, England (models of 1863–1869); Maudslay & Sons of London, England (models of 1870–1872); R. & H. Green Shipbuilders of London, England (models of 1872-1890 and 1894–1896); J. W. Thames of London, England (models of 1890–1893); Napier, Shanks & Bell of Glasgow, Scotland (models of 1893–1894); Fairfield Shipbuilders of Glasgow, Scotland (models of 1903–1906, 1910–1911, 1914–1929, and 1938–1962); Armstrong Shipbuilders in Newcastle and Glasgow, United Kingdom (models of 1905–1907); Atl. & Chantiers de France in Dunkerque, France (models of 1907–1911); Hawthorn Leslie and Company in Newcastle, England (models of 1911); Kinderdijk L. Smith & Zoon Ltd, Holland (models of 1951).

The oldest vapur in operation, Paşabahçe, was built by Cantieri Navali di Taranto SPA, Taranto, Italy in 1952. Since then, most vapurs have been constructed at the Haliç, Hasköy, Camialtı, and İstinye Shipyards in Istanbul.

=== High-Speed Ferries ===
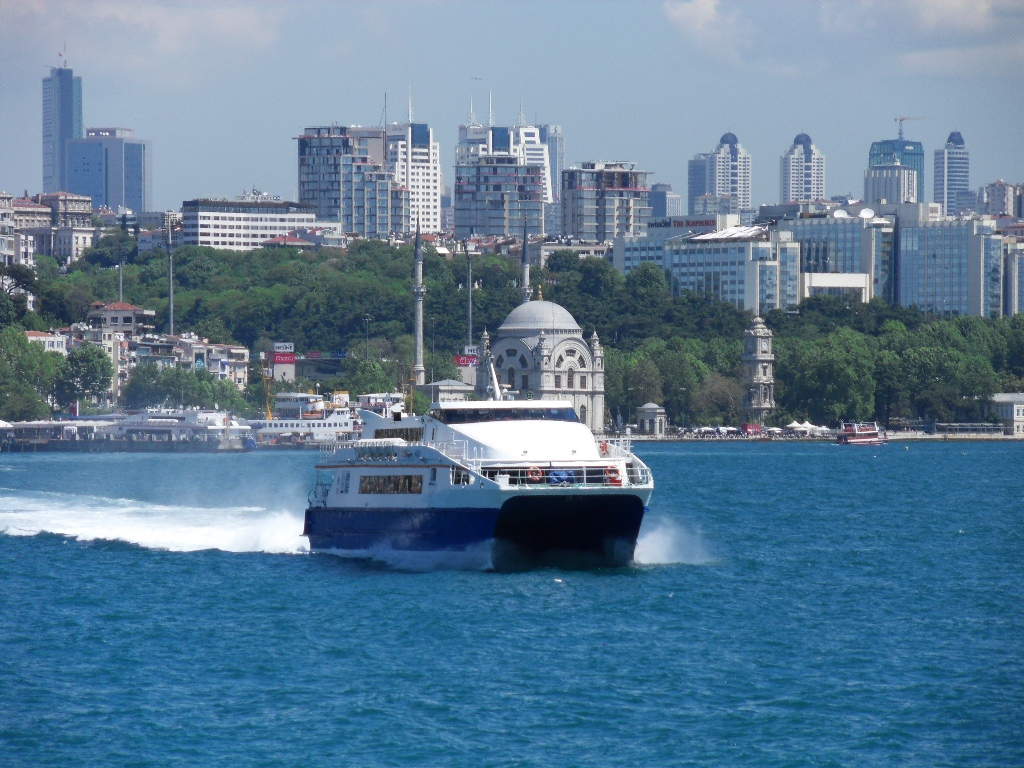
A Seabus on the Bosphorus strait in Istanbul

On 16 April 1987 the Municipality of Istanbul established a company to provide fast sea transport with catamaran-type high-speed ferries. With the first ten vessels purchased from Norway, modernization of sea transportation was achieved. Today, the, now privately owned, İDO serves 29 terminals with a fleet of 28 catamarans, including six high-speed car ferries.

=== Aerial lift ===
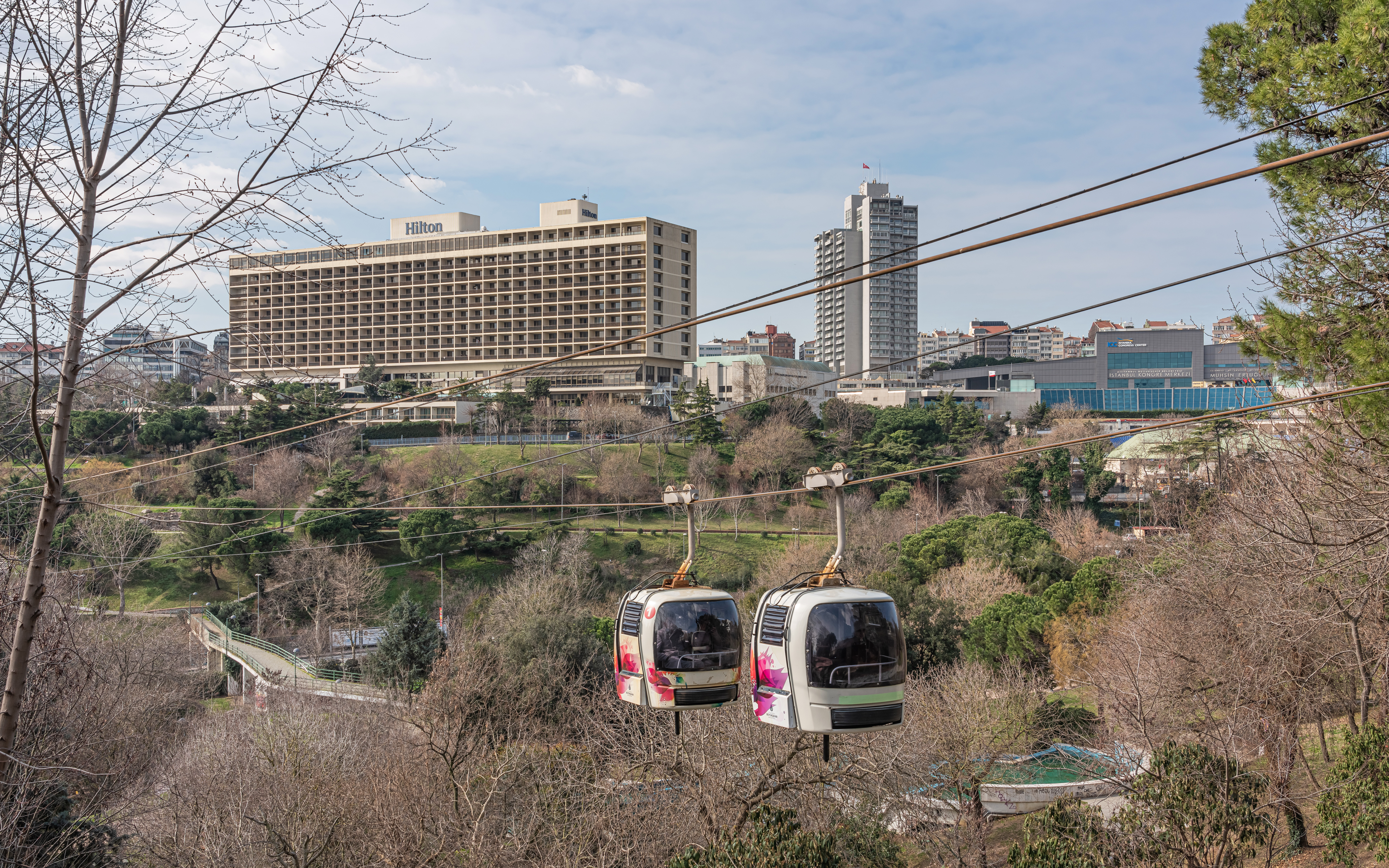
Maçka Gondola tandem cabins at Maçka Terminal

There is a short gondola lift line above the Democracy Park in the valley between Taksim and Maçka, the Maçka Gondola (Turkish: Maçka-Taşkışla Teleferiği), built in 1993. It connects the hotels Hilton Istanbul Bosphorus on one side with Parksa Hilton and Swissotel The Bosphorus on the other side. The cable line is 333 m (1,093 ft) long and transports in two cabins with six seats each around 1,000 passengers daily. The trip takes three minutes.

A second aerial lift line, the Eyüp Gondola (Turkish: Eyüp-Piyerloti Teleferiği) was opened in 2005 between the historical district of Eyüp and the Pierre Loti Hill. The gondola lift, built by the Italian Leitner Ropeways Co. of Leitner Group was the most expensive cable car line in Turkey costing 5 million Euros.

== Statistics ==
The average time that people spend commuting with public transit in Istanbul, for example to and from work, on a weekday is 91 min. About 30% of public transit users ride for more than 2 h every day. The average amount of time people wait at a stop or station for public transit is 19 min, and 36% of riders wait for over 20 min on average every day. The average distance that people usually ride in a single trip by public transit is 12 km, and 35% travel for over 12 km.

== Smart Ticket ==
Istanbul has an integrated electronic ticket system for bus, funiculars, LRT, metro, commuter trains, ferryboats and trams. The system uses smart RFID cards, called Istanbulkart, as tickets. The old Akbil iButtons were phased out in 2015.

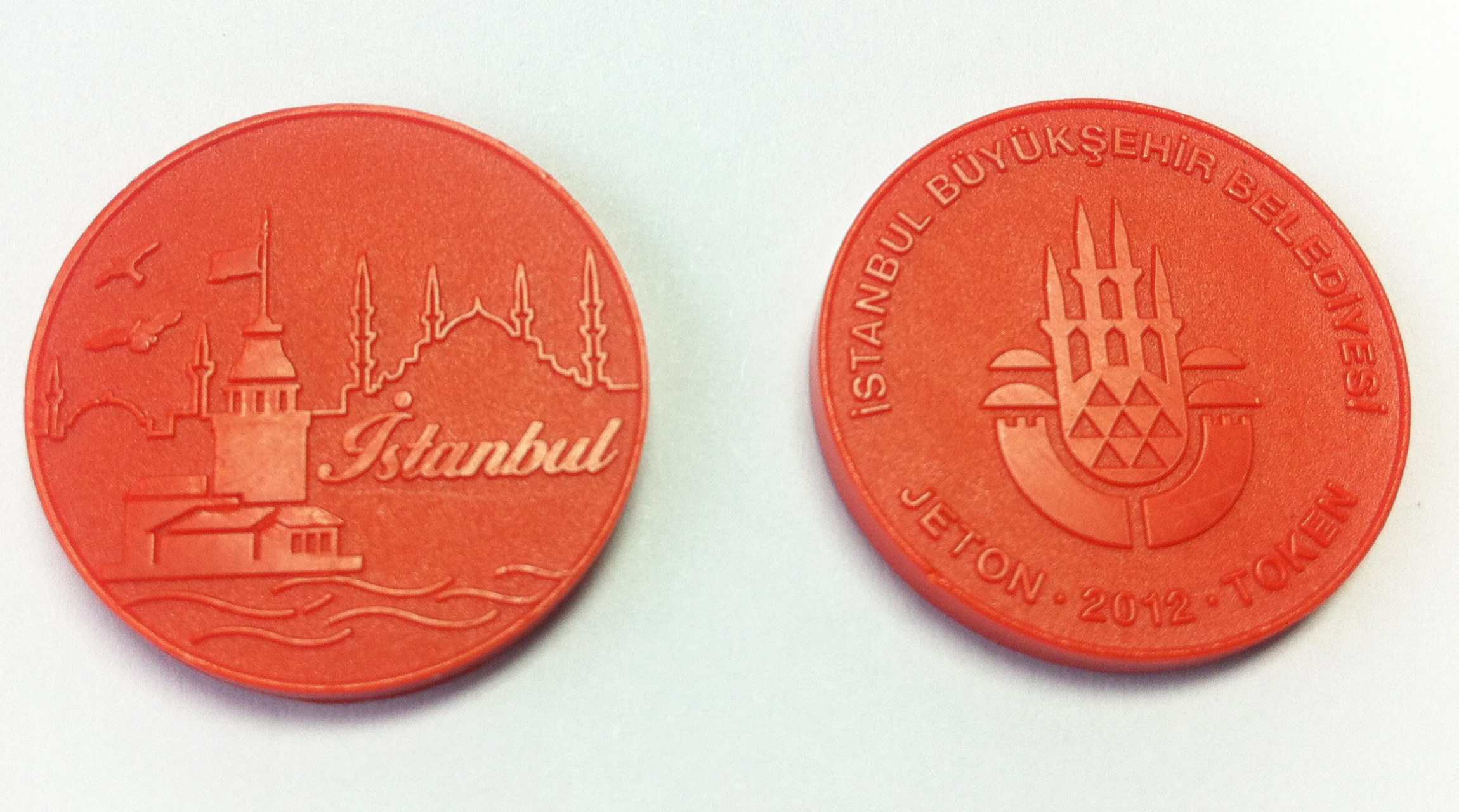
Istanbul Jeton

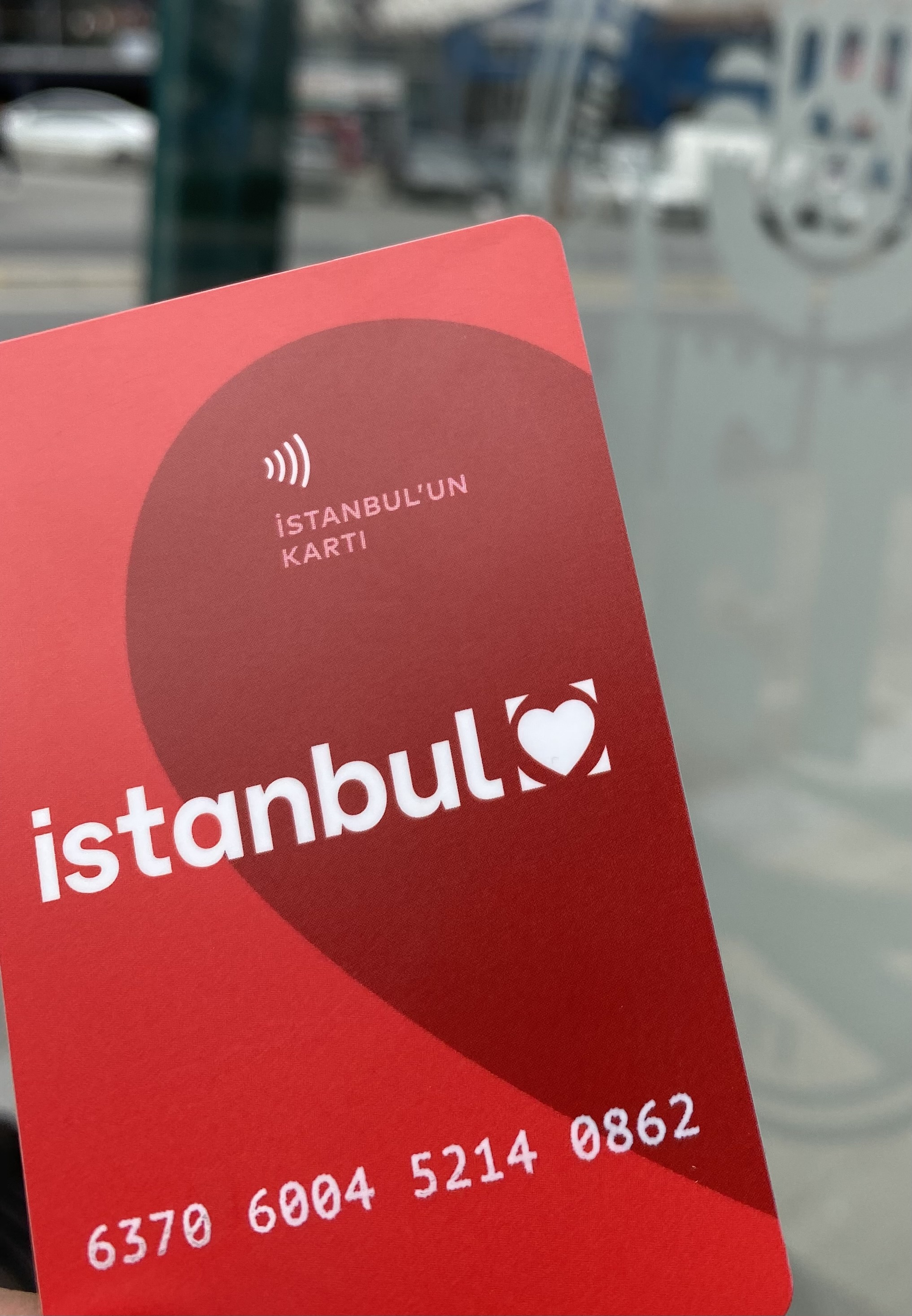
Istanbulkart

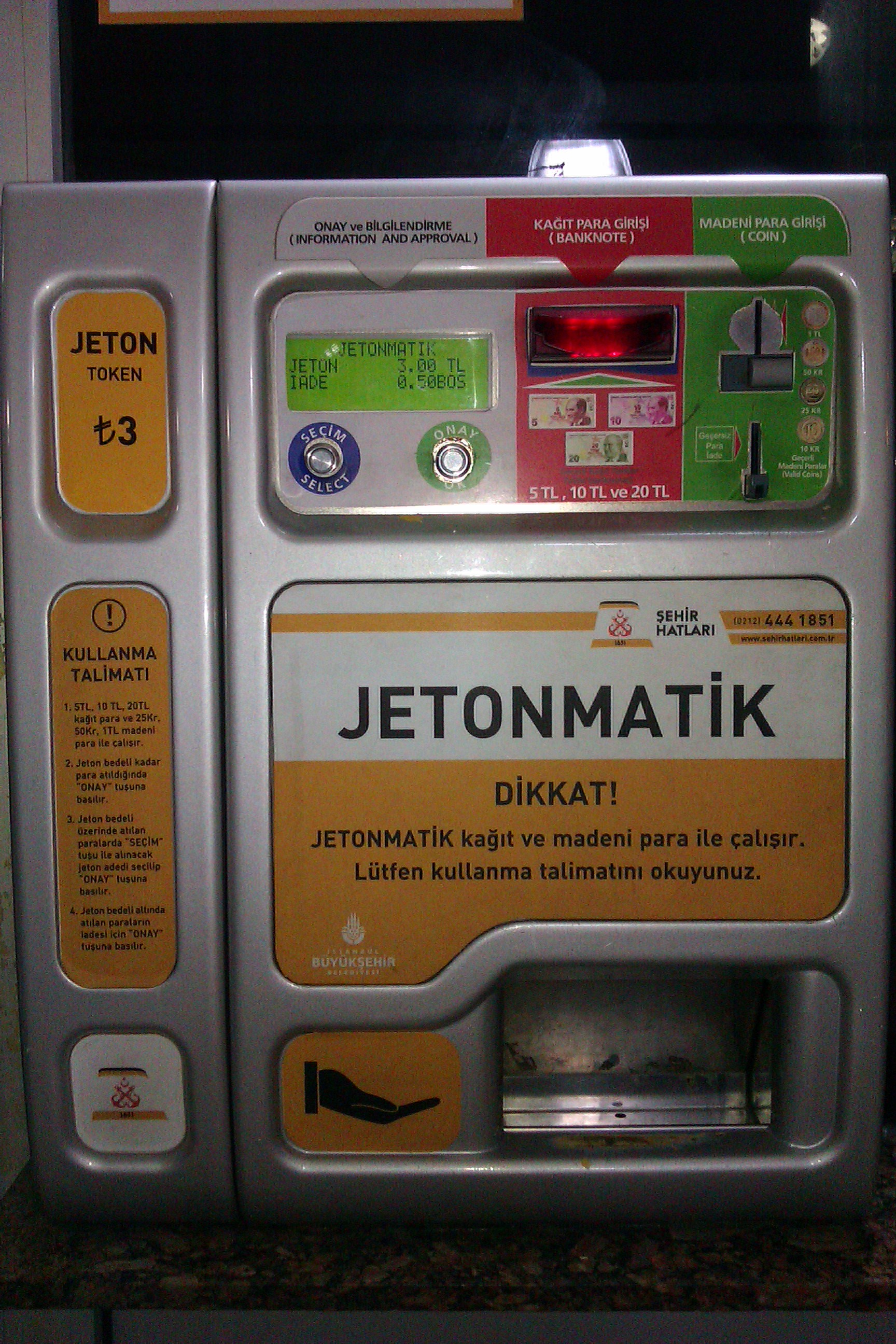
Jetonmatik

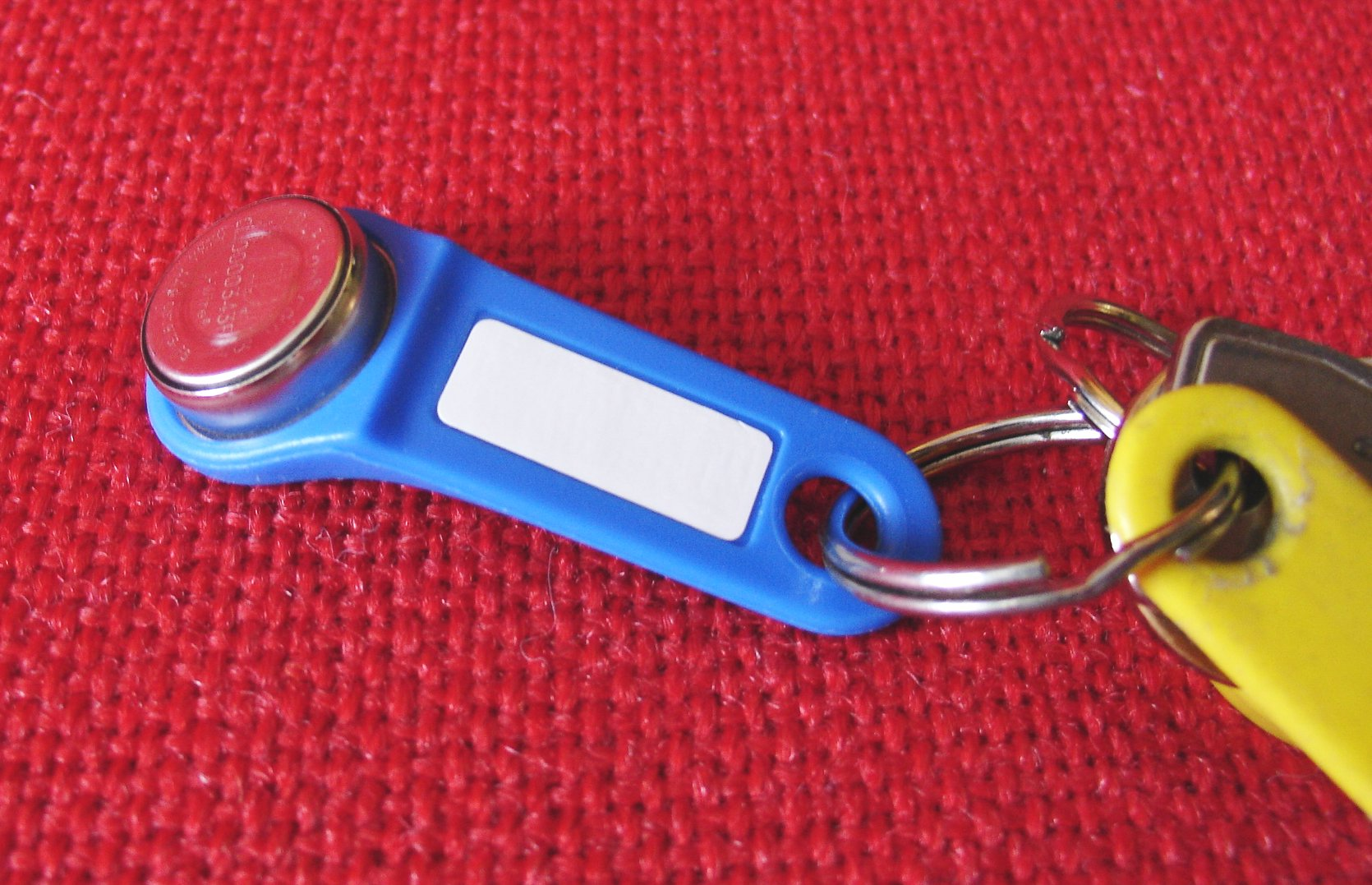
Akbil (smart ticket)

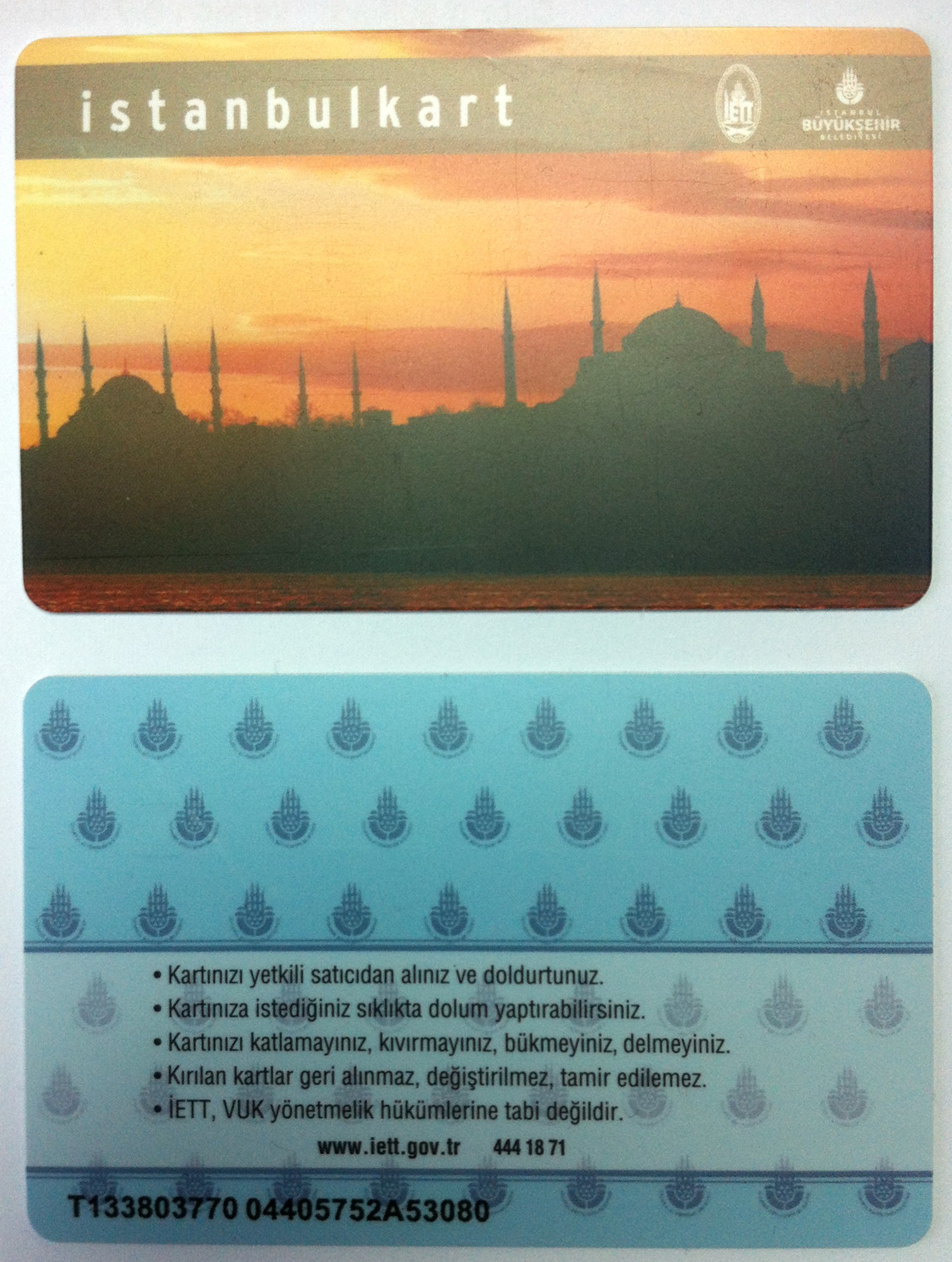
Istanbulkart

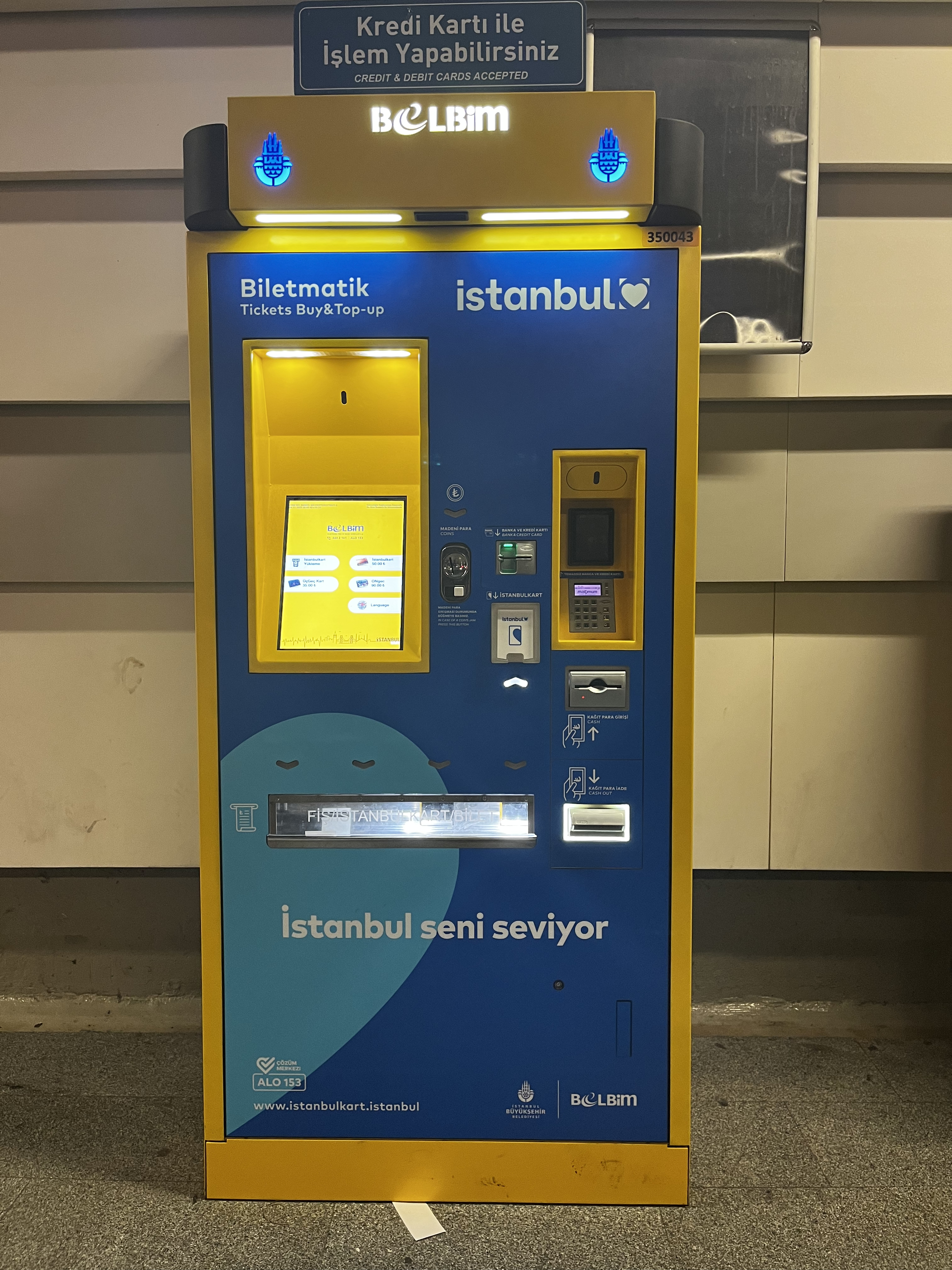
Biletmatik

== See also ==
- Istanbul nostalgic tramways
- Sabiha Gökçen Airport
- Metrobus (Istanbul)
- Ferries in Istanbul
- Istanbul Airport
- Istanbul Metro
- Istanbul Tram
- Marmaray
- Boji (dog)
