= Dolmuş =

Share taxi in Turkey and Northern Cyprus

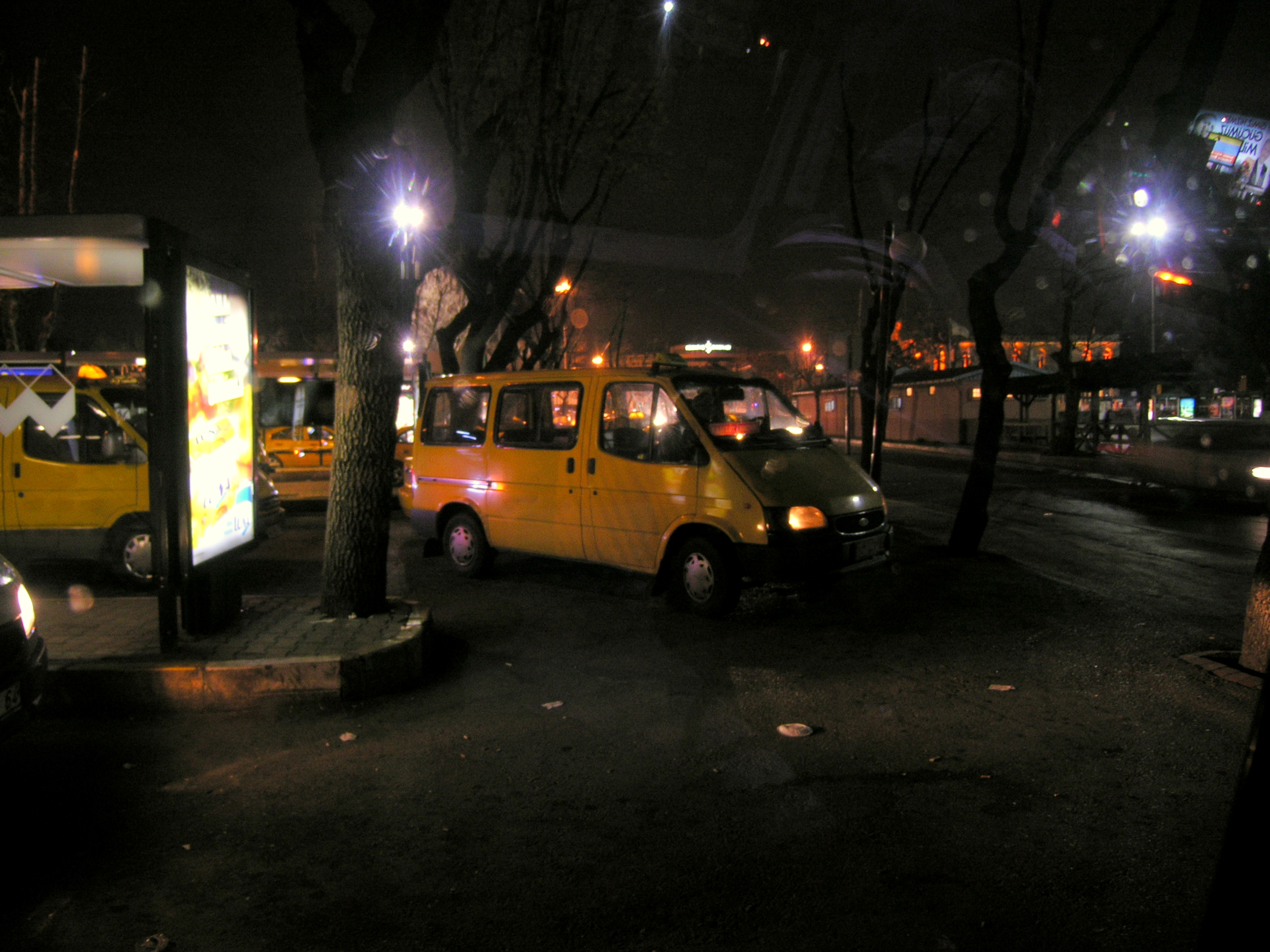
Dolmuş terminus in Kadıköy

In Turkey and Northern Cyprus, a dolmuş (pronounced [doɫmuʃ]) is a share taxi that runs set routes within and between cities.

== Background ==
This system was devised first in 1929, after the Great Depression. The name dolmuş is derived from Turkish for "seemingly stuffed", in reference to how the vehicles were often filled to the brim. When it was first devised, they used taxi vehicles and did not depart until all seats were full, hence the name. At some locations they depart from the terminal only when a sufficient number of passengers have boarded.

In some cities, dolmuşlar are only allowed to board and disembark passengers at designated stops or terminals. In less busy locations, passengers may board anywhere along the route. In fact, a dolmuş with empty seats may slow down to pick up more passengers. In some cities, to prevent extremely slow travel, intermediate stop timings of dolmuşlar are regulated more like a regular bus on a latest allowable arrival basis.

In Turkey the vehicles used are either brand-new (or old) minibuses or light commercial vehicles cosmetically (such as extra lights) and functionally modified to take more non-sitting passengers and even a second door at the rear sometimes. but in some parts of Cyprus – as of 2009 – aging Mercedes-Benz stretch limos serving as dolmuşlar can still be seen.

== Regulations ==
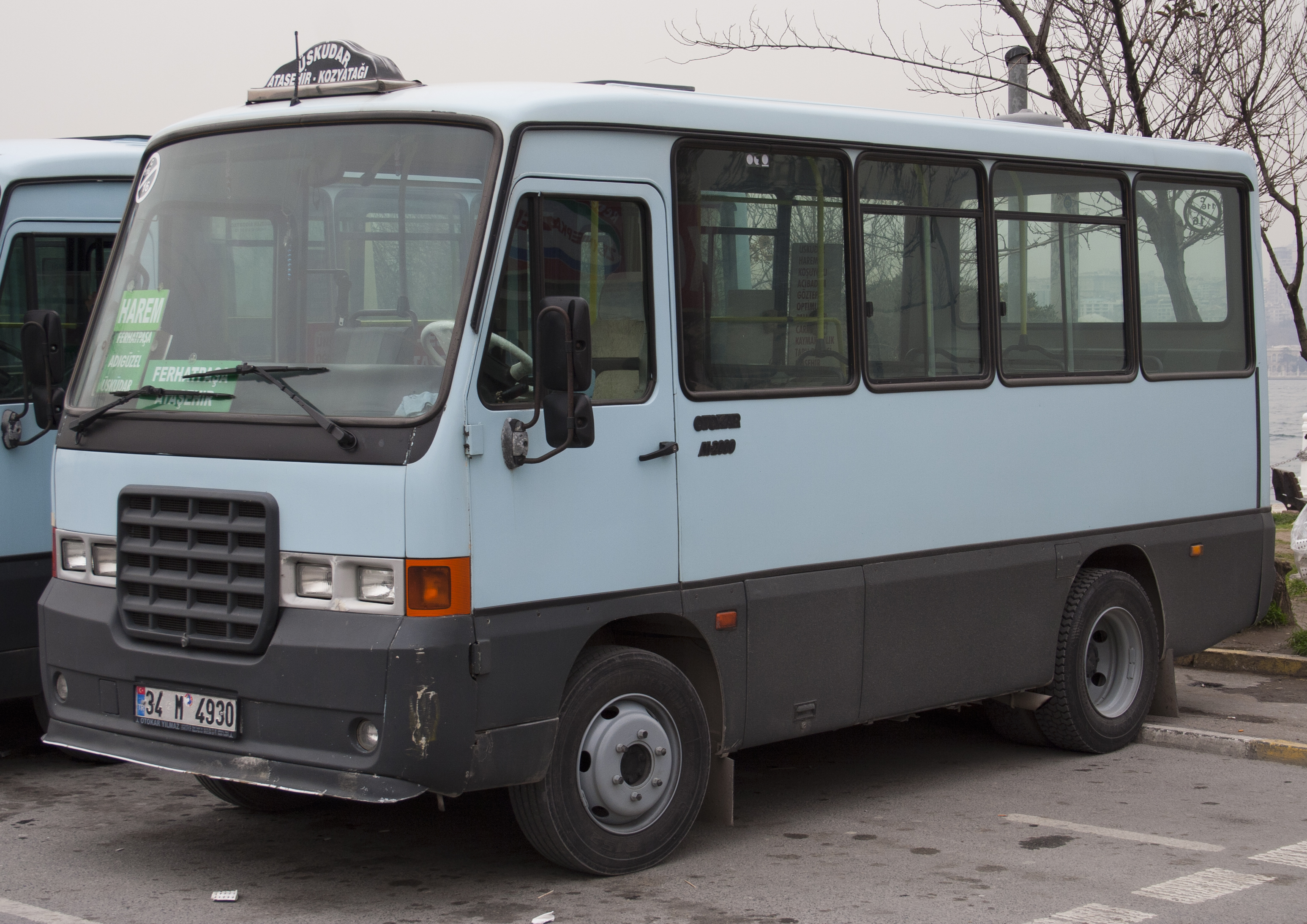
An Otokar M-2000 dolmuş

In Turkey the industry is regulated under an apportionated registration scheme. Despite the meaning of their name, laws prevent these minibuses from becoming too crowded. In İzmir and some other cities, standing passengers are not allowed; in İstanbul and some other cities, they are. In Turkish controlled Northern Cyprus, dolmuş routes are leased under an apportionated registration scheme and vehicles are licensed.

In 2024, the Istanbul Metropolitan Municipality started trialing minibuses using a contactless smart card system for payment instead of cash.

== See also ==
- Dollar van
- Marshrutka
- Nanny van
- Pesero
- Public light bus Hong Kong
- Share taxi
- Songthaew
