= Akbil (smart ticket) =

Electronic ticket system

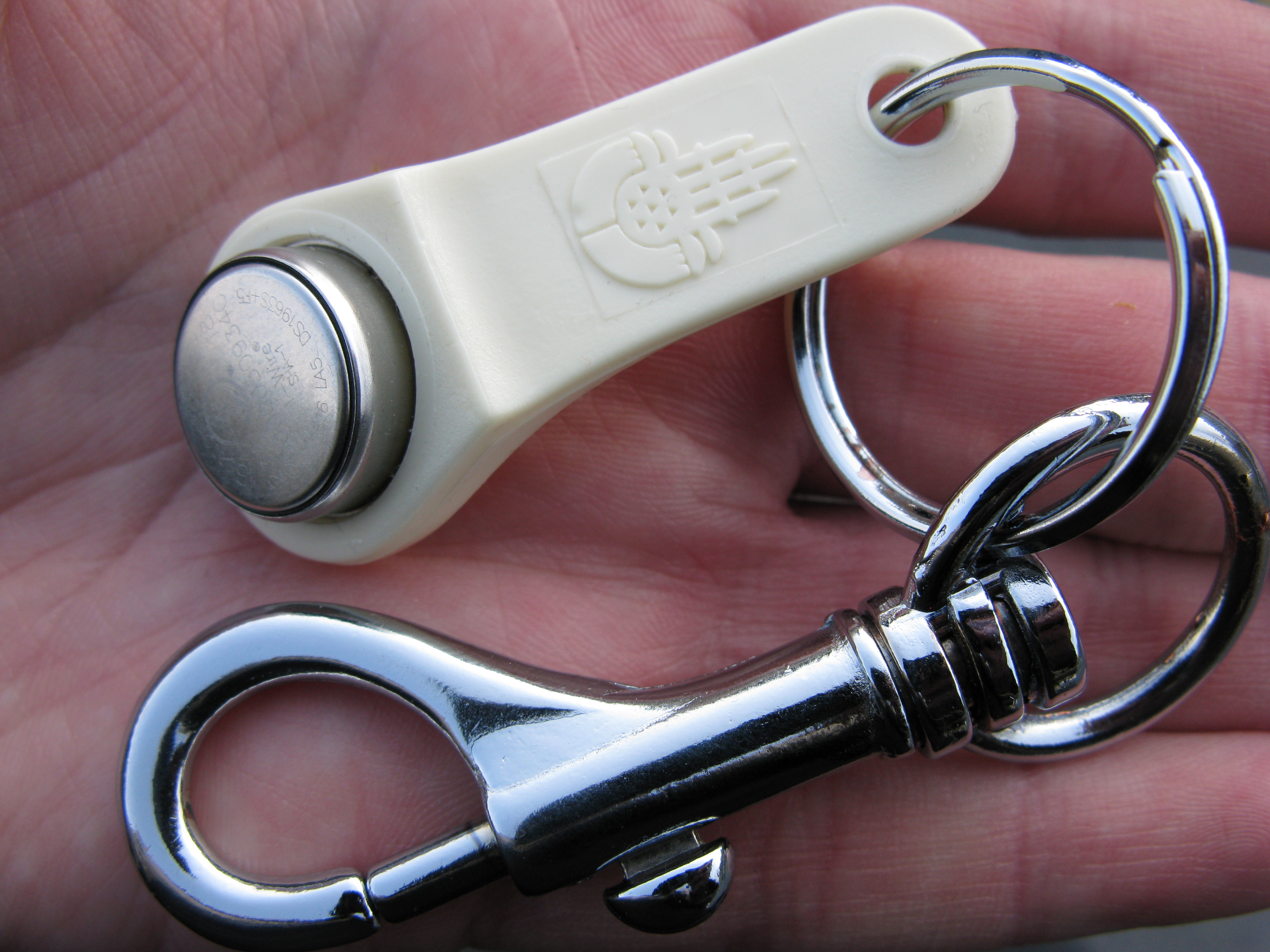
- Istanbul Akbil smart ticket
- Location: Istanbul Province
- Technology: 1-Wire
- Operator: Istanbul Metropolitan Municipality
- Currency: TL (150 TL maximum load)
- Stored-value: Pay as you go
- Credit expiry: None
- Unlimited use: Istanbul Province
- Validity: Buses, BRT; Funiculars, Cable car; LRT, Trams; Metro; Suburban trains (TCDD); Ferryboats, Sea bus (İDO)
- Retailed: Offices; Newsstands; Small shops

Akbil was an integrated electronic ticket system used for fare payment on public transport in Istanbul, Turkey, and was first issued in 1995. In 2009 it was replaced by the Istanbulkart; while existing Akbil tickets could still be used, new ones were no longer sold, and it was completely phased out in 2015. It was valid for boarding buses, funiculars, LRT, metro, commuter trains, ferryboats and trams operated by the Metropolitan Municipality. Unlike payment by cash, the Akbil allowed a passenger to transfer service within the transportation network under some defined conditions. Akbil is a portmanteau formed from "akıllı", which stands for "smart", and "bilet" meaning "ticket".

The Akbil device was touched to the reader at the faregate to gain access for boarding or on the vehicle to ride. The system used iButtons or smart radio-frequency identification cards as tickets. Akbils were 1-Wire (iButton) electronic tags. The keyfob version of the device had the emblem of the Istanbul Metropolitan Municipality moulded on it.

The units could be acquired from offices near major transport interchanges for a refundable deposit of 6 TL, and were loaded with credits in these offices in amounts up to 150 TL. Alternatively, they could be loaded at special purpose machines, newsstands or small shops which offered this service.
