= Istanbulkart =

Public transit payment card

- Istanbulkart logo
- Location: Istanbul Province
- Launched: 23 March 2009; 17 years ago
- Technology: ISO/IEC 7816 and ISO/IEC 14443
- Operator: BELBİM
- Manager: Istanbul Metropolitan Municipality
- Currency: TL (2750 TL maximum load)
- Stored-value: Pay as you go
- Credit expiry: None
- Validity: Bus, Metrobus; Trams, LRT; Funiculars; Subway; Commuter rail; Ferry, Seabus; Public Bathrooms
- Retailed: Online; Stations; Newsstands
- Variants: Ordinary card; Season card; Discounted card; Free card
- Website: www.istanbulkart.istanbul

Istanbulkart is a contactless smart card for fare payment on public transport in Istanbul, Turkey. They are valid for all types of transport in Istanbul, including buses, ferries, railways, and trams. The ordinary card may be purchased for a non-refundable deposit of ₺165, and then loaded and used on a pay as you go system. Special classes of cards are available for residents of the city. Up to five people can use the card that is available for tourists.

== History ==
The Istanbulkart was introduced on 23 March 2009 in addition to the Akbil, an integrated electronic ticket system which was eventually phased out in 2015. The card was developed and put into practice by the information technology company Belbim of the Metropolitan Municipality.

In 2021, due to the outbreak of the COVID-19 pandemic in Turkey, all passengers using an Istanbulkart were required to pair it with their HES (Hayat Eve Sığar, literally "Life Fits into Home") code, a public health tracking system. This is no longer necessary.

== Technology ==
The Istanbulkart is compatible with international standards such as ISO/IEC 7816 and ISO/IEC 14443 and is built using NXP's DESFire technology. Its use is planned to be extended to payments at municipality operated parking lots and theatres, as well as for privately owned taxis, Dolmuş (share taxis) and movie theatres. The personalized type of the smart card can also be used in a more general form for admission to an event or establishment or for municipality provided social welfare purposes.

== Types and usage ==
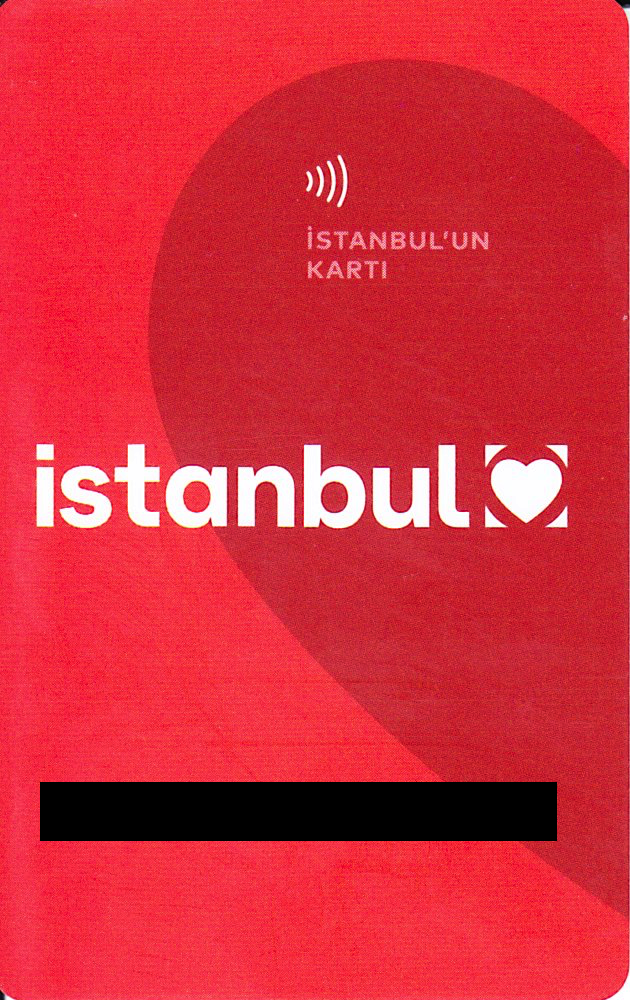
İstanbulkart

The Istanbulkart is valid for boarding buses, funiculars, İstanbul LRT, Istanbul Metro, Marmaray (commuter trains), İDO (public ferries), and trams operated by the Metropolitan Municipality and private companies. Cash payment on these transport systems is not possible.

There are four different types of the Istanbulkart, one ordinary and three special. The special cards are issued upon the holder's legal eligibility, and are therefore personalized:

1. Ordinary card: full fare payment
2. Mavi Kart (Blue card) (season ticket): seasonal ticket discounted on monthly use basis (residents only)
3. Discounted card: for students, teachers, senior citizens (over 60 years of age)
4. Free card: for handicapped or disabled persons, senior citizens (over 65 years of age) and government employees underway on duty

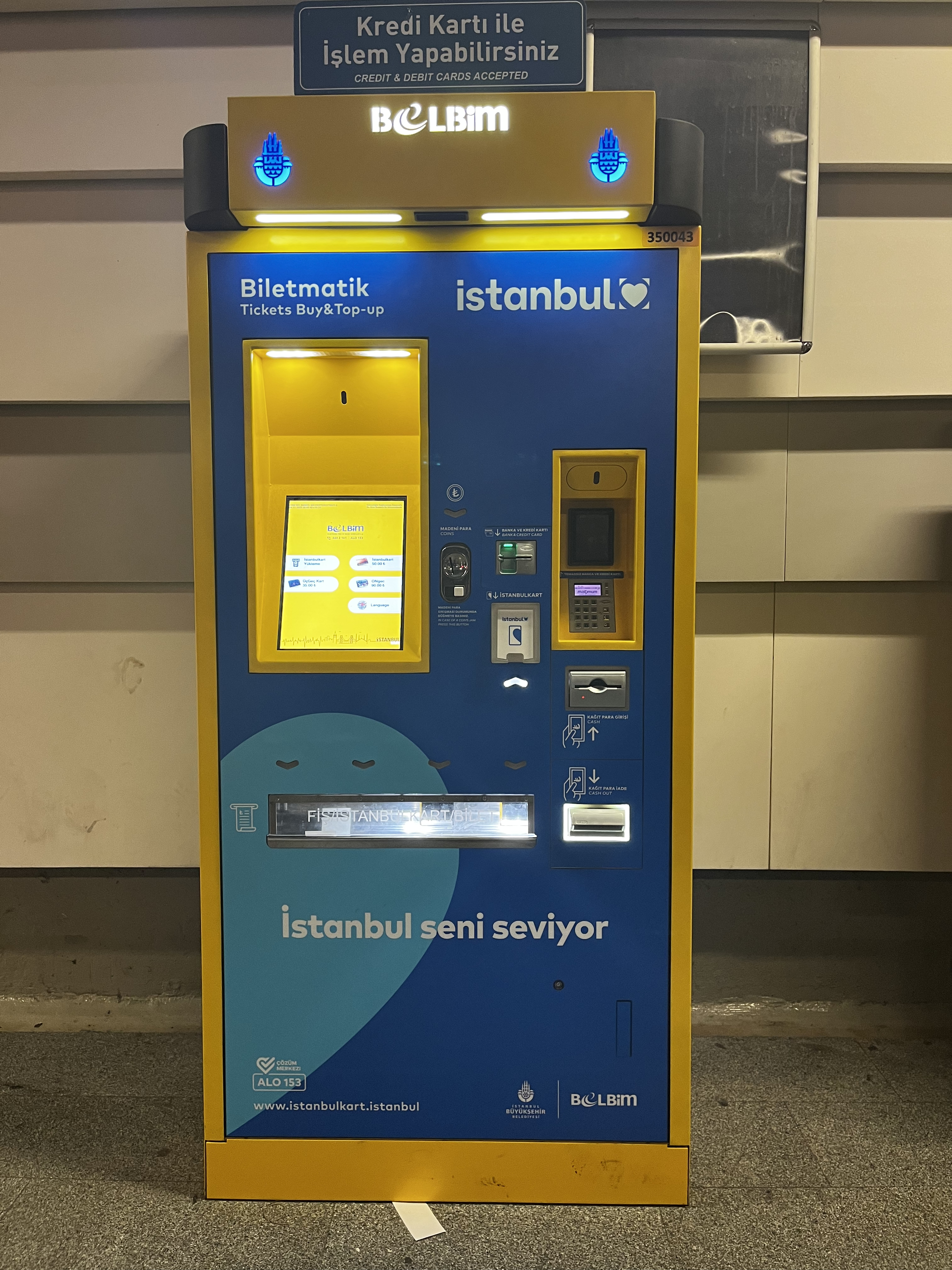
Istanbulkart machine

Unlike the ordinary cards, the special cards are issued on a named basis, so they require an application to be made at one of the 13 application centers, or on the internet. The special cards offer reduced fees for up to five transfers within two hours to other vehicles on the transportation network.

The ordinary cards may be acquired from offices at major transport interchanges for a nonrefundable deposit of 165TL (as of March 2026). It can also be purchased for from vending machines located at metro entrances. The remaining sum will be deposited on the card. Afterwards, the cards can be loaded with credits up to 2750 TL at these offices, special purpose machines, vending machines on the metro or at news-stands and small shops which offer this service.

Cards for a limited number of passes (1, 2, 3, 5 or 10), called the Istanbul City Card, are also available. Museum and Bosphorus tours are included in these.

=== How to pay with the card ===
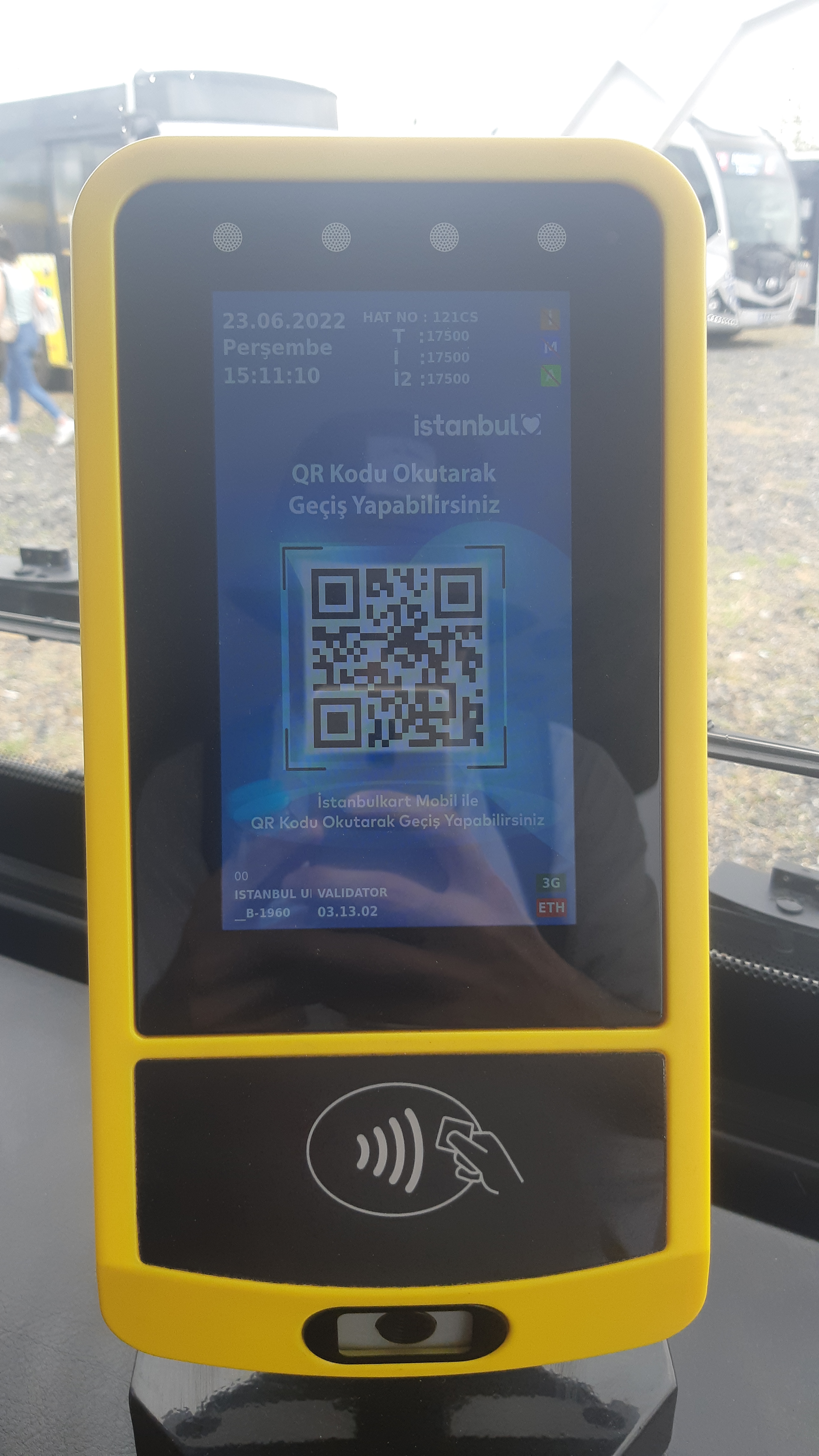
Istanbulkart validator

To pay the fare, the smart card is brought into close proximity, up to 8 cm (3.1 in), with a contactless reader during boarding of the transportation vehicle or at the toll gates of the station. It is not necessary for the card to touch the reader, cards inside a wallet or a handbag can be also read for rapid payment. The reader device signals confirmation of the fare payment with an audible sound, and the screen turns green showing the payment and the remaining deposit after a split second. In case of insufficient deposit on the smart card, the card reader shows the warning message "Yetersiz Bakiye" (Insufficient deposit) on its display along with an audible warning.

Up to five people can travel on one card (tap the card, wait a few seconds, and then a second user can tap the card, etc).

== See also ==
- İzmir Kentkart
