= Merkez, Beykoz =

City center of Beykoz district, Istanbul

Merkez
- Neighbourhood
- Location in Turkey Merkez (Istanbul)
- Coordinates: 41°08′04″N 29°05′36″E
- Country: Turkey
- Province: Istanbul
- District: Beykoz
- Population (2022): 5,870
- Time zone: UTC+3 (TRT)

Merkez or Beykoz Merkez is a neighbourhood in the municipality and district of Beykoz, Istanbul Province, Turkey. Its population is 5,870 (2022). It is the city center of Beykoz district and one of its 45 neighborhoods on the Anatolian/Asian side of Istanbul.

Looking at its administrative borders, Yalıköy and Ortaçeşme neighborhoods lie in the north; to the northeast is Akbaba; Elmalı village is to the east; İncirköy neighborhood is to the southeast; Gümüşsuyu is to the south; and to the west is the Bosphorus Strait.

The 500-year-old Onçeşmeler (İshak Ağa Fountain), the work of Mimar Sinan and taking its latest form in 1746 AD/1159 AH, is located in the square on the coast. The historical Serbostani Mustafa Ağa Mosque (1809 AD/1229 AH) stands next to it. The upper quarter was known as the Armenian Quarter with its Surp Nigoğayos Church first built in 1776.

A fishing community thrives on the coast of Merkez.
