= Dereseki, Beykoz =

Neighborhood in Beykoz, Istanbul, Turkey

Dereseki is a neighborhood in the Beykoz district of Istanbul, Turkey. Its population in 2019 was 1,513.

Dereseki is bordered on the north by the Kaynarca and Alibahadır neighborhoods of Beykoz, on the east by the Mahmutşevketpaşa neighborhood of Beykoz, on the south by the Örnekköy and Elmalı neighborhoods of Beykoz, and on the west by the Akbaba neighborhood of Beykoz.

== History ==
The village is said to have been founded in the 14th century by a religious leader named Kırklar Sultan, whose tomb is located on a "seat" (or terrace, seki) overlooking the stream (dere) that runs through the village. The name is given as Deresekili in some 16th-century records.

The earliest mention of the village in Ottoman records seems to be in a 1523 foundation register (vakıf defteri) or a 1513-1529 judge's register (sicil). Dereseki was listed as a "foundation village," whose revenues were used to support an imaret and mescit established by Selim I in Istanbul. Under Bayezid II and Süleyman the people of Dereseki and Çubuklu were required to cut and transport trees for the Boğazkesen Fortress (probably Rumelihisarı) and to clear roads of snow; these duties exempted them from the avarız tax. Dereseki paid some of the highest agricultural taxes in the area, and also paid tax on walnuts, tax on reedbeds and reeds, tax on the local timber pier, and a tithe (öşür) on gardens.

In one source, the village mosque is said to have been built by someone named Molla Feneri Mehmed Efendi who died in 1547-48 (apparently not the Molla Fenari who died in 1431). In another source, the mosque is attributed to Fenarîzade Muhyiddin Çelebi, who died in 1547.

In April 1915, during World War I, Dereseki and vicinity were bombarded for about one hour by a Russian fleet.

== Products ==
The village was known in the past for its beans (Dereseki fasulyesi), which due to urbanization are no longer grown.
