= Yavuz Sultan Selim Bridge =

Cable-stayed suspension bridge in Turkey

Yavuz Sultan Selim Bridge Yavuz Sultan Selim Köprüsü
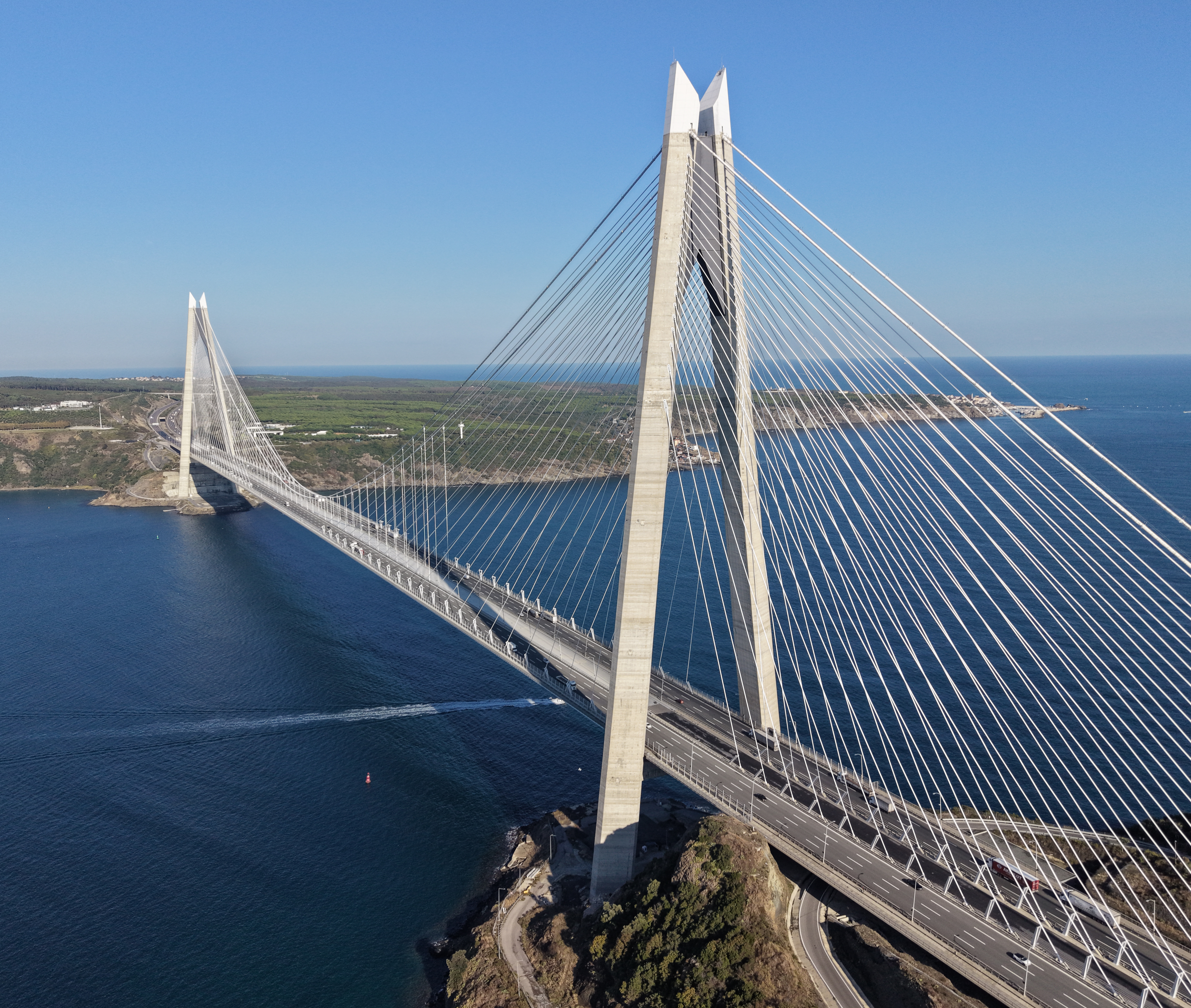
- Yavuz Sultan Selim Bridge in Istanbul
- Coordinates: 41°12′11″N 29°06′42″E
- Carries: 8 lanes of Motorway O-7 and 1 double-track railway
- Crosses: Bosphorus
- Locale: Istanbul
- Official name: Yavuz Sultan Selim Bridge
- Other name: Third Bosphorus Bridge
- Maintained by: İçtaş-Astaldi consortium
- Followed by: Fatih Sultan Mehmet Bridge

Characteristics
- Design: Hybrid cable-stayed suspension bridge
- Total length: 2,164 m (7,100 ft)
- Width: 58.5 m (192 ft)
- Height: 322 m (1,056 ft)
- Longest span: 1,408 m (4,619 ft)
- Clearance below: 64 m (210 ft)

History
- Designer: Jean-François Klein; Michel Virlogeux; T-ingénierie
- Construction start: 29 May 2013
- Construction cost: 4.5 billion TRY
- Opened: 26 August 2016

Statistics
- Toll: ₺70 (cars); ₺50 (motorcycles)

Location
- Interactive map of Yavuz Sultan Selim Bridge

The Yavuz Sultan Selim Bridge (Turkish: Yavuz Sultan Selim Köprüsü), also known as the Third Bosphorus Bridge, is a vehicular bridge over the Bosphorus strait, to the north of Istanbul's two older suspension bridges, the 15 July Martyrs Bridge being the First Bosphorus Bridge and Fatih Sultan Mehmet Bridge the Second Bosphorus Bridge. The bridge is located near the entrance to the Black Sea from the Bosphorus strait, between Garipçe in Sarıyer on the European side and Poyrazköy in Beykoz on the Asian side.

The foundation stone was laid on 29 May 2013 and the bridge opened to traffic on 26 August 2016.

At 322 m (1,056 ft), it is the world's sixth-tallest bridge of any type. The main span is the 13th longest suspension bridge in the worldIt is also one of the world's widest suspension bridges, at 58.4 metres (192 ft) across, making it one of the biggest transport megaprojects.

== Project ==
The bridge is part of the projected 260 km (160 mi) Northern Marmara Motorway (Turkish: Kuzey Marmara Otoyolu), which will bypass urban areas of northern Istanbul connecting Kınalı, Silivri in the west and Paşaköy, Hendek in the east. The 58.4-metre-wide (192 ft) bridge is 2,164 m (7,100 ft) in length with a main span of 1,408 m (4,619 ft).

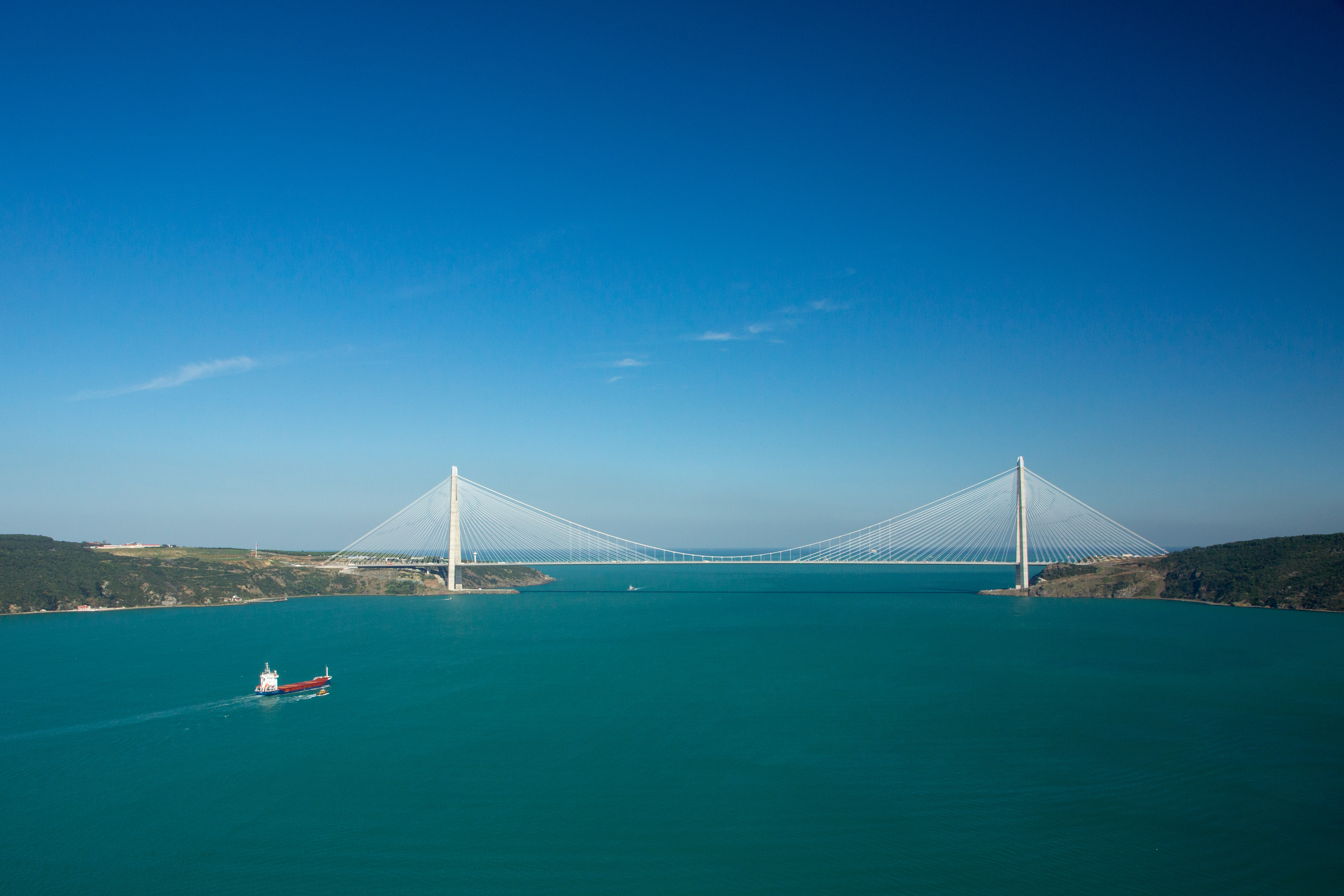
The view of the bridge with the seasonal turquoise waters.

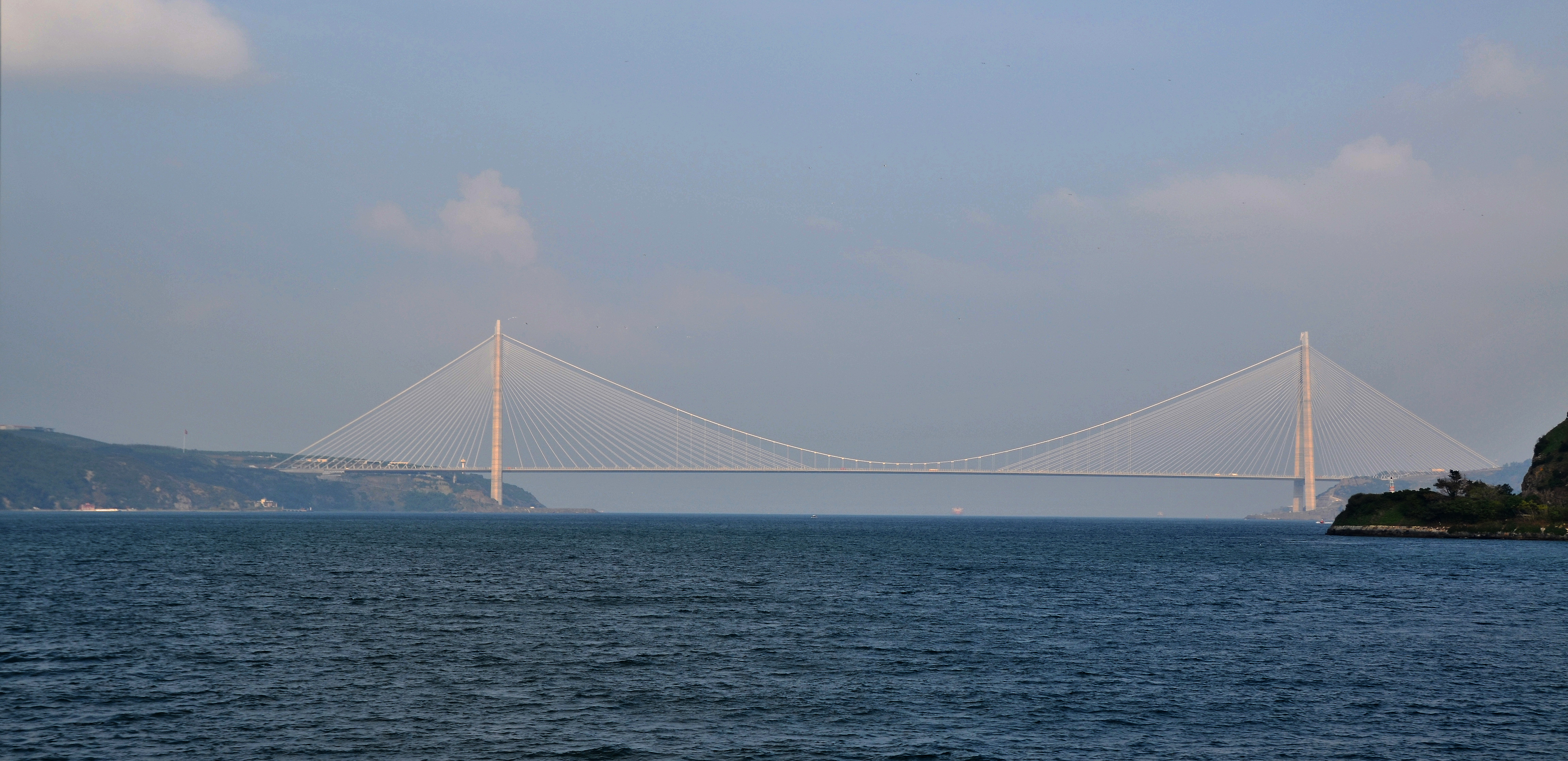
A view of the bridge from the Bosphorus, south.

Designed by the Swiss engineer Jean-François Klein (project leader) and by the French structural engineer Michel Virlogeux from T-ingénierie (a Geneva-based company), the bridge is a combined road-rail bridge. It carries four motorway lanes and one railway track in each direction. The construction was carried out by a consortium of the Turkish company İçtaş and the Italian company Astaldi which won the bid to construct it on 30 May 2012. The budgeted cost for the bridge was 4.5 billion TRY (approximately US$2.5 billion as of March 2013). Construction was originally expected to be completed in 36 months with the opening date scheduled for the end of 2015.

According to the Minister of Transport and Communication Binali Yıldırım, of the total area nationalised for the bridge, 9.57% was private property, 75.24% was forested land, and the remaining 15.19% was state-owned land.

In June 2018, during the Turkish currency and debt crisis, Bloomberg reported that Astaldi and Webuild, an Italian multinational construction company, were poised to sell their stake in the project for $467 million. The project had failed to meet projections, requiring Ankara to boost operators' revenue from treasury coffers, and since early 2018 the partners in the joint venture sought restructuring of $2.3 billion of debt from creditors. On July 30, 2018, China's ICBC was authorized as the lead regulator to refinance the $2.7 billion loan for the bridge.

The bridge toll between the motorway exits Odayeri and Riva was 11.95 Turkish lira for cars in 2017, and had risen to 70 lira by 2024 (VAT inclusive). Tolls are charged in both directions and are payable only electronically. It was expected upon construction that at least 135,000 vehicles will use the bridge daily in each direction.

== Construction ==
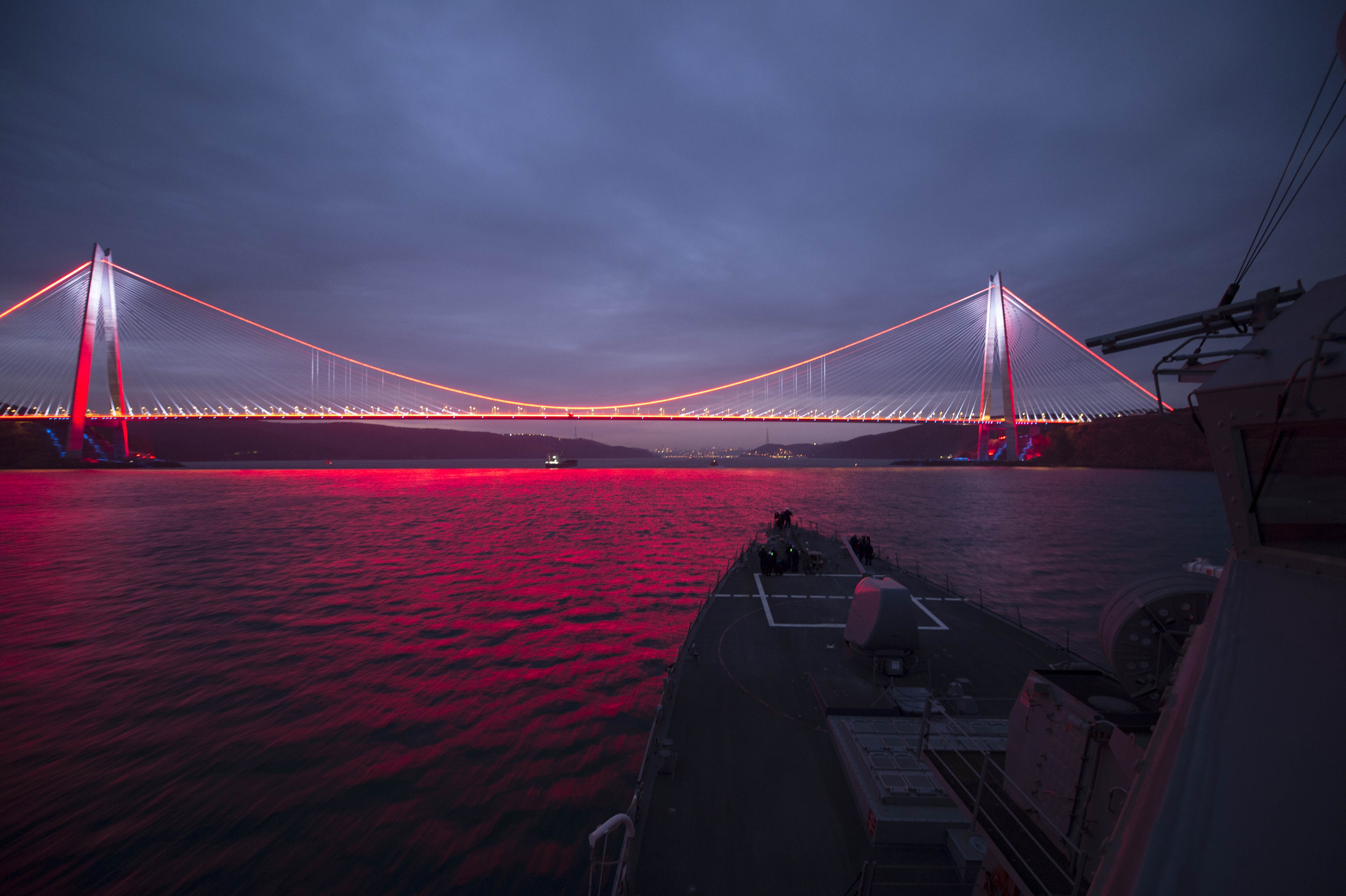
A view of the bridge at night.

Plans for a third Bosphorus bridge were approved by the Ministry of Transportation in 2012. The construction of the project was awarded to the İçtaş-Astaldi consortium on 29 May 2012.

Construction began officially with the laying of the foundation stone in a ceremony held on 29 May 2013, the anniversary of the conquest of Constantinople in 1453. The ceremony was attended by the then State President Abdullah Gül, Prime Minister Recep Tayyip Erdoğan and numerous high-ranking officials. Erdoğan directed the construction management team to complete construction within 24 months, and set the opening date for 29 May 2015.

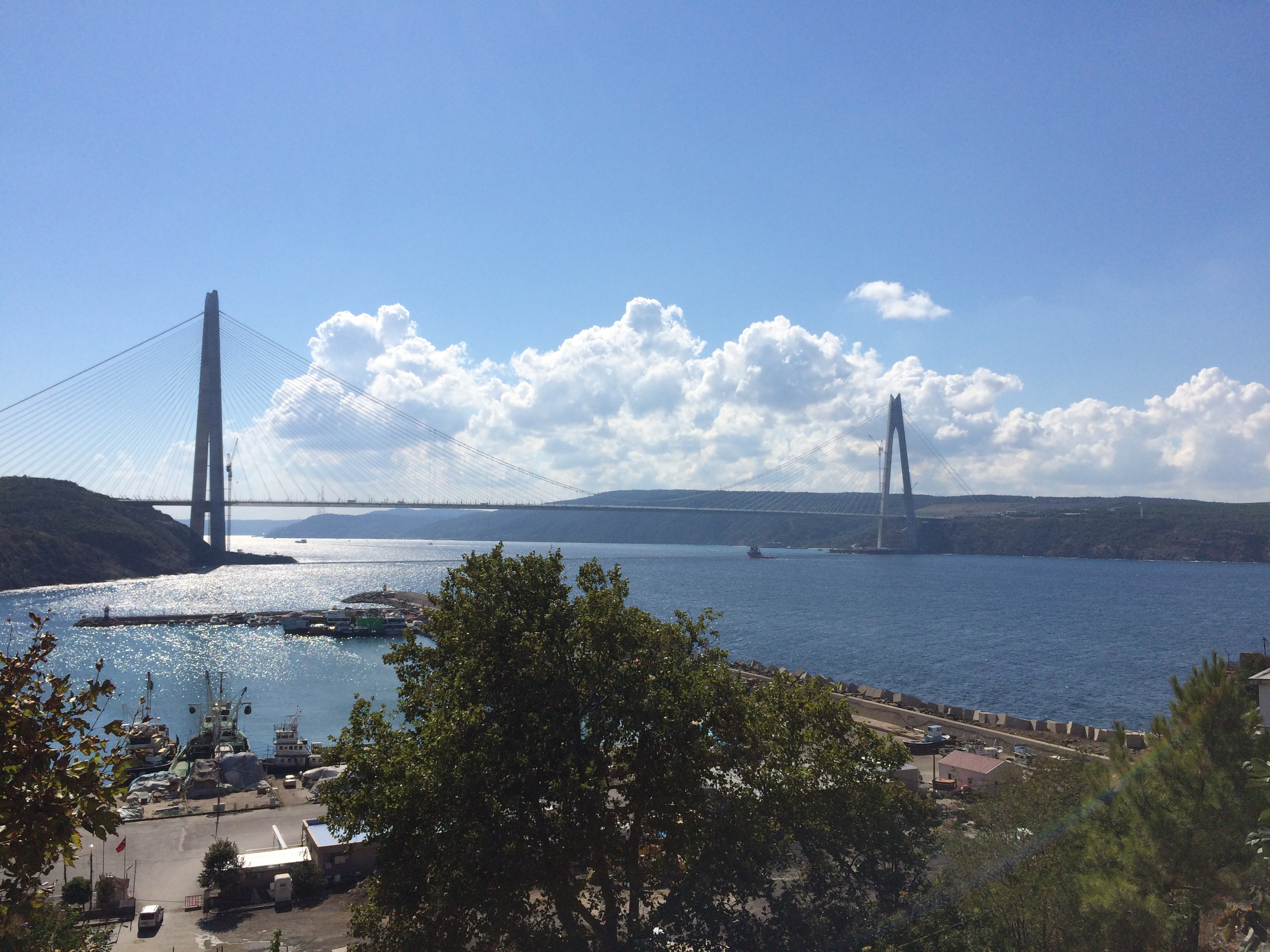
Yavuz Sultan Selim Bridge from Poyrazköy on October 26, 2018.

Work was temporarily halted in July 2013 after it became evident that the site was poorly located, but by then thousands of trees had already been cut down. The paperwork filed for a change of plan written by the State Highways Directorate Director-General Mehmet Cahit Turhan on 11 June 2013, reads "it is appropriate to cancel the current construction plan due to the necessity of making a revision, which resulted from changes of the route project". Both the ministry and the construction company have denied any change to the site location.

On 5 April 2014, a fatal accident occurred during construction of the link road to the bridge on the Asian side of the Bosphorus near Çavuşbaşı, Beykoz. Three workers were killed and another was injured when he fell from collapsed scaffolding while concrete was being poured at a viaduct.

== Name of the bridge ==
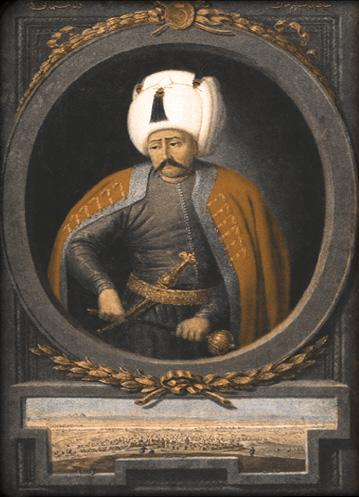
Ninth Sultan of the Ottoman Empire, Selim I (1470–1520)

At the ground-breaking ceremony President Abdullah Gül announced that the bridge would be named the Yavuz Sultan Selim Bridge, in honour of Ottoman Sultan Selim I (c. 1470–1520), who expanded the Ottoman Empire into the Middle East and North Africa in 1514–1517 and obtained the title of Caliph of Islam for the Ottoman dynasty after his conquest of Egypt in 1517. He was nicknamed Yavuz, traditionally translated in English as "Grim", but closer to "Stern" or "Implacable" in Turkish.

The choice of name led to protests by Turkey's Alevi community because of Sultan Selim I's alleged role in the Ottoman persecution of Alevis. After the Şahkulu Rebellion (1511) in Anatolia, and the Battle of Chaldiran (1514) in northwestern Iran, during which the Kızılbaş warriors of the Alevis in eastern Anatolia (who adhere to the Shia sect of Islam) sided with Shah Ismail I of Safavid Persia, the victorious Selim I ordered the massacre of the Kızılbaş whom he considered traitors and heretics (see also Ottoman–Safavid relations and Ottoman–Persian Wars).

== Controversy surrounding the bridge ==
Land prices in the less urbanized areas on both sides of the Bosphorus immediately soared in expectation of an urbanization boom thanks to the new cross-water connection, according to Ekumenopolis, a documentary film of 2010 about the area. The efficacy of the proclaimed goal of easing traffic congestion was also challenged, with some claiming that "the project is little more than a contrivance to open for development lands that had been long protected by law". Many consider the green areas and wetlands in question, producing most of the drinking water for the city, to be "essential for Istanbul's ecological and economic sustainability, and a possible pollution of the groundwater would provoke the collapse of the city". In 1995, Erdoğan, then mayor of Istanbul, had himself declared that a third bridge would mean "the murder of the city".

== Opening ceremony ==
The opening ceremony on 26 August 2016 was attended by Bulgarian Prime Minister Boyko Borisov, Bosniak president of Bosnia and Herzegovina Bakir Izetbegović, Macedonian President Gjorge Ivanov, the King of Bahrain Hamad bin Isa Al Khalifa and President of the self-declared state of Northern Cyprus Mustafa Akıncı. Also, Chief Minister of Punjab (Pakistan) Shahbaz Sharif, Sandžak Bosniak Deputy Prime Minister of Serbia Rasim Ljajić, First Vice Prime Minister of Georgia Dimitri Kumsishvili and high-ranking officials from Azerbaijan also attended the opening ceremony. Turkish President Recep Tayyip Erdoğan and Prime Minister Binali Yıldırım delivered speeches.

== Galleries ==
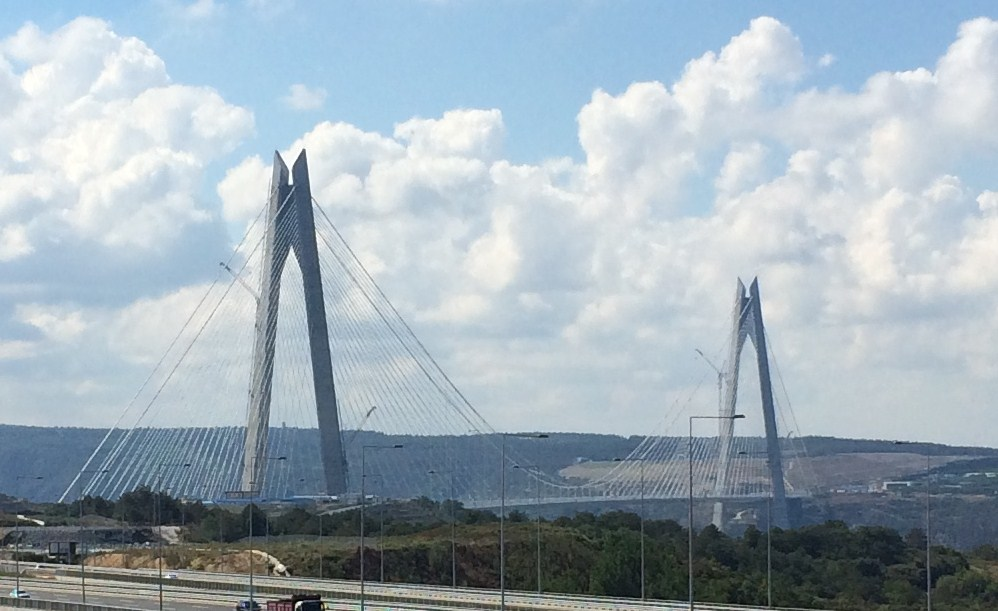
Yavuz Sultan Selim Bridge, view from Poyrazköy road

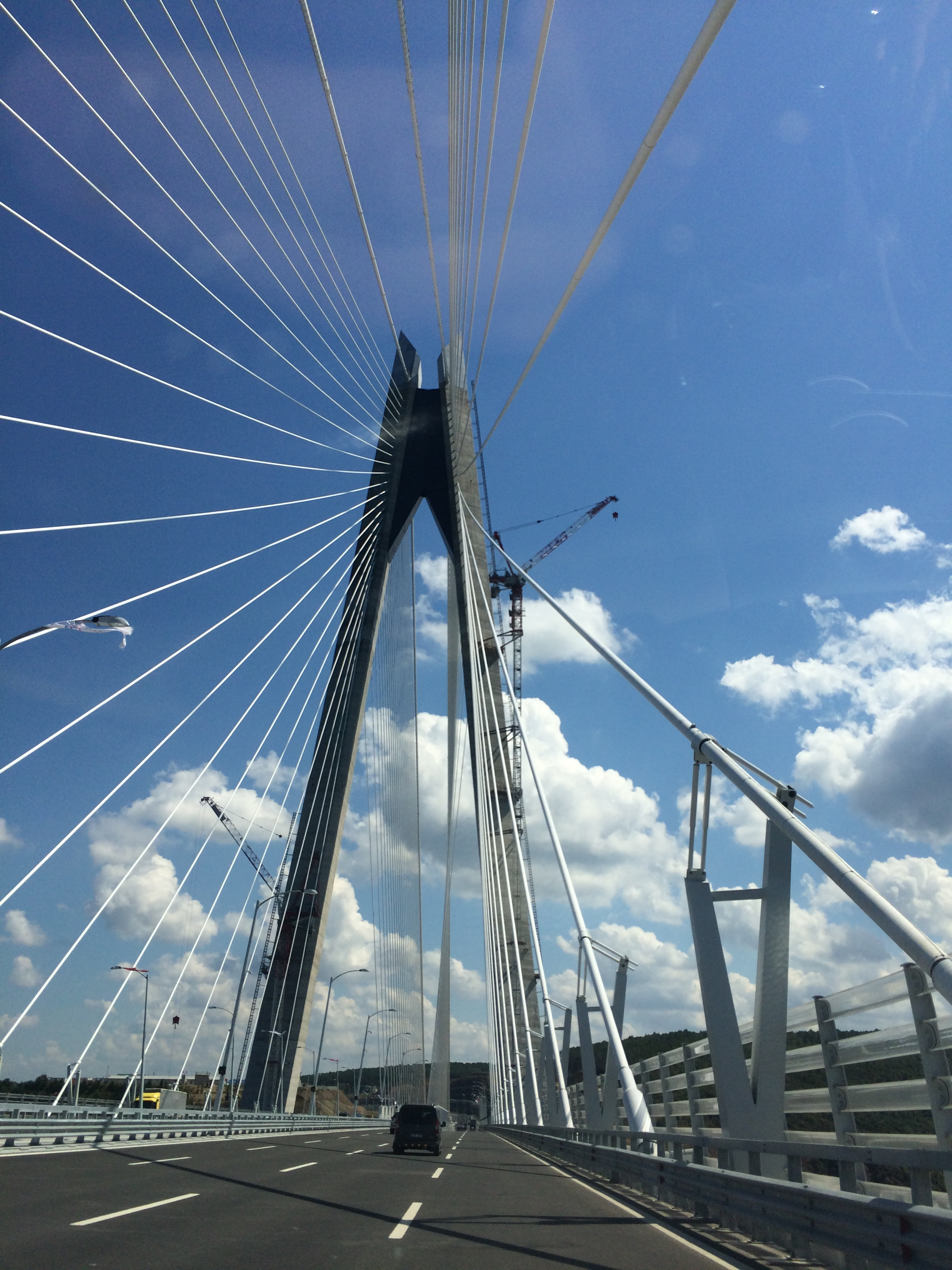
Yavuz Sultan Selim Bridge, Poyrazköy leg

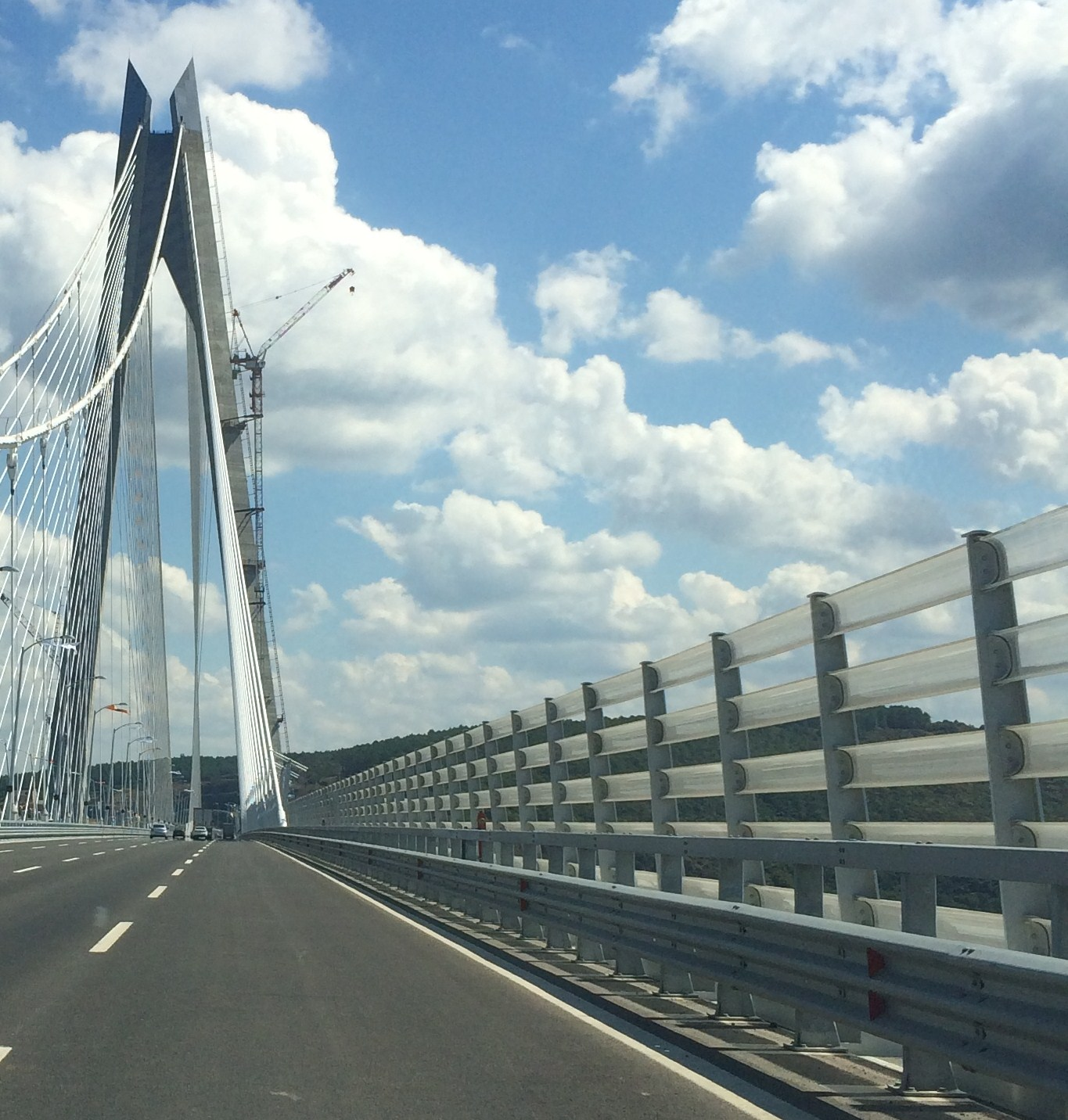

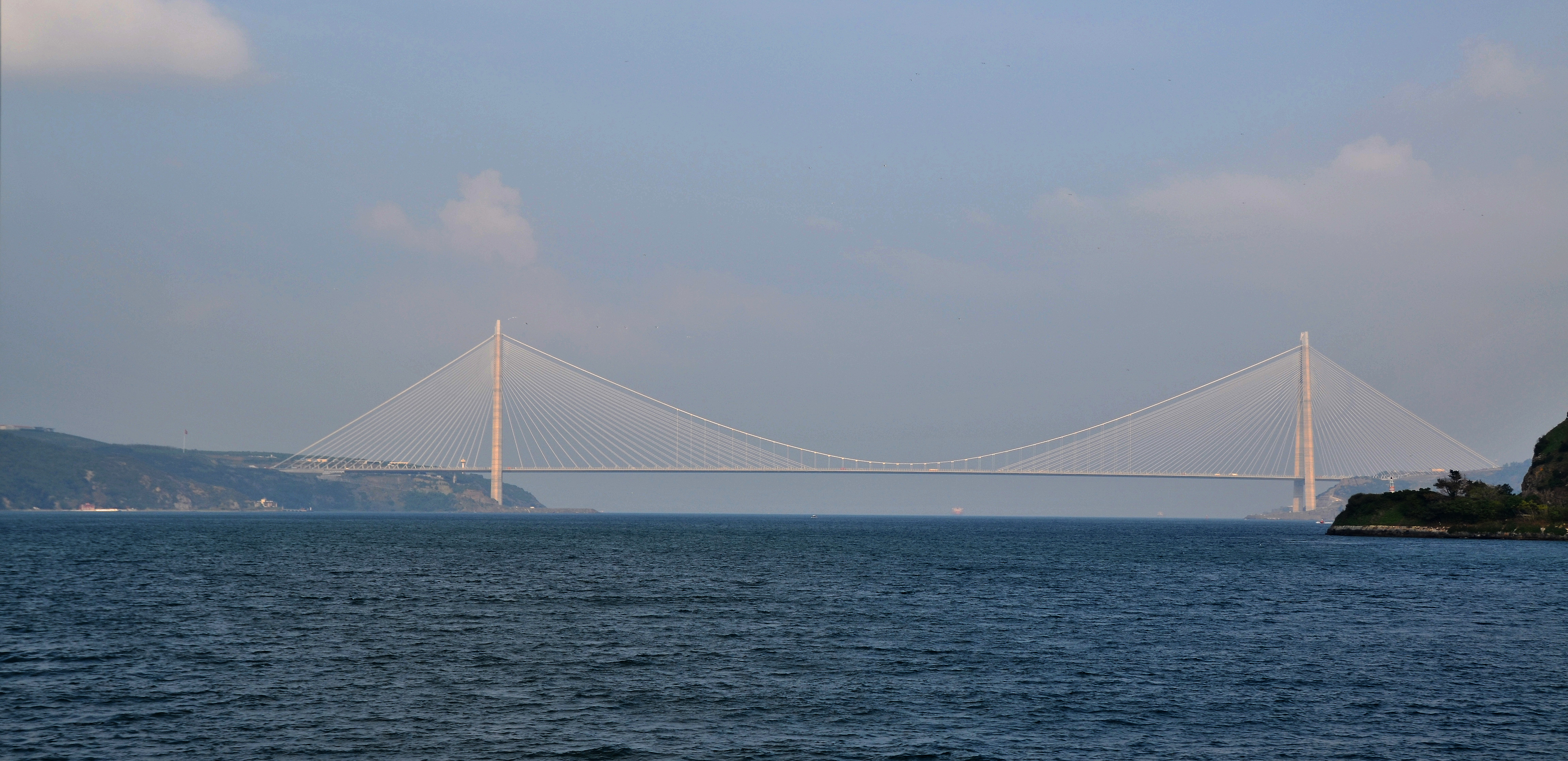

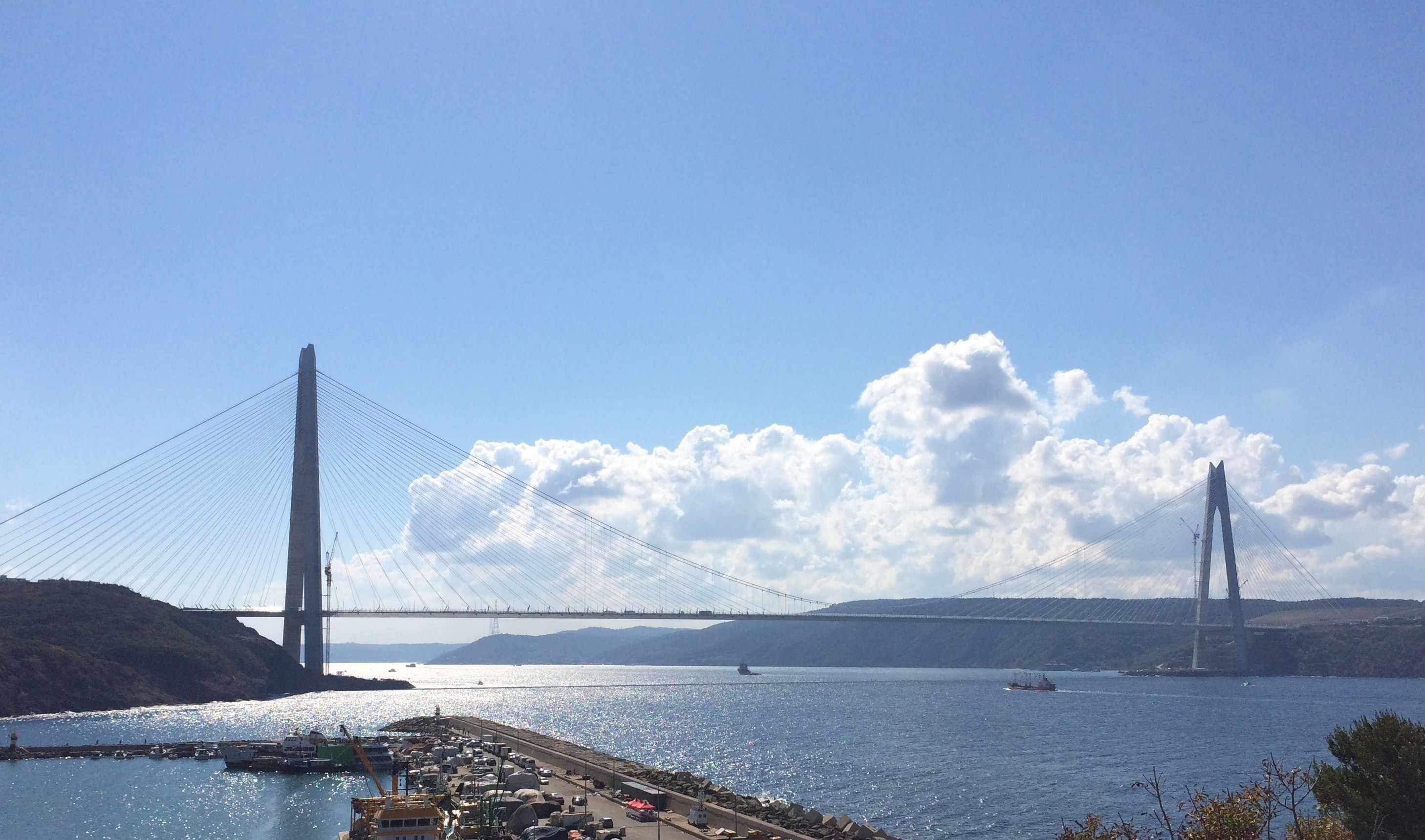
Yavuz Sultan Selim Bridge, view from Poyrazköy

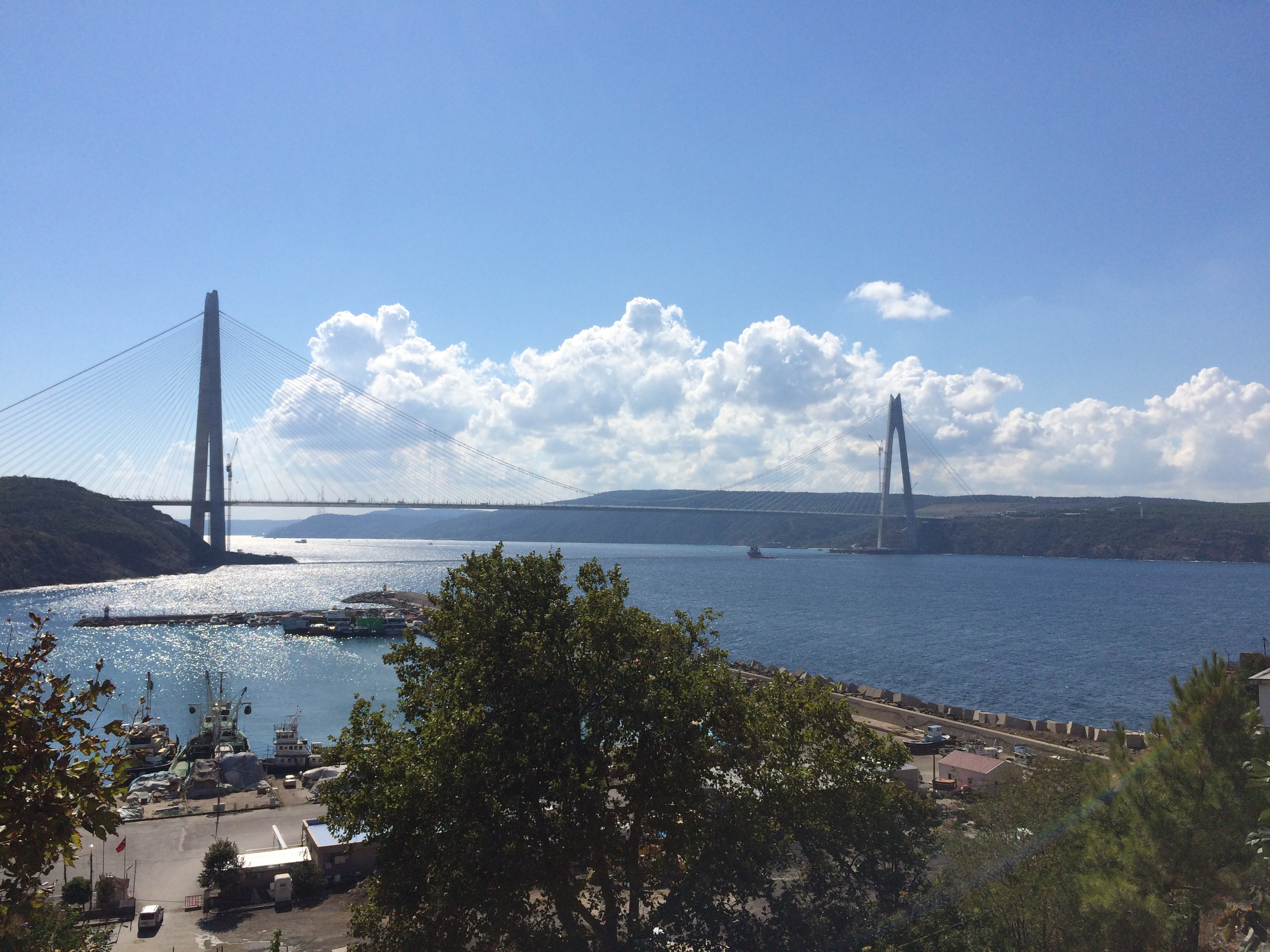
Yavuz Sultan Selim Bridge, view from Poyrazköy

=== Stages of construction ===
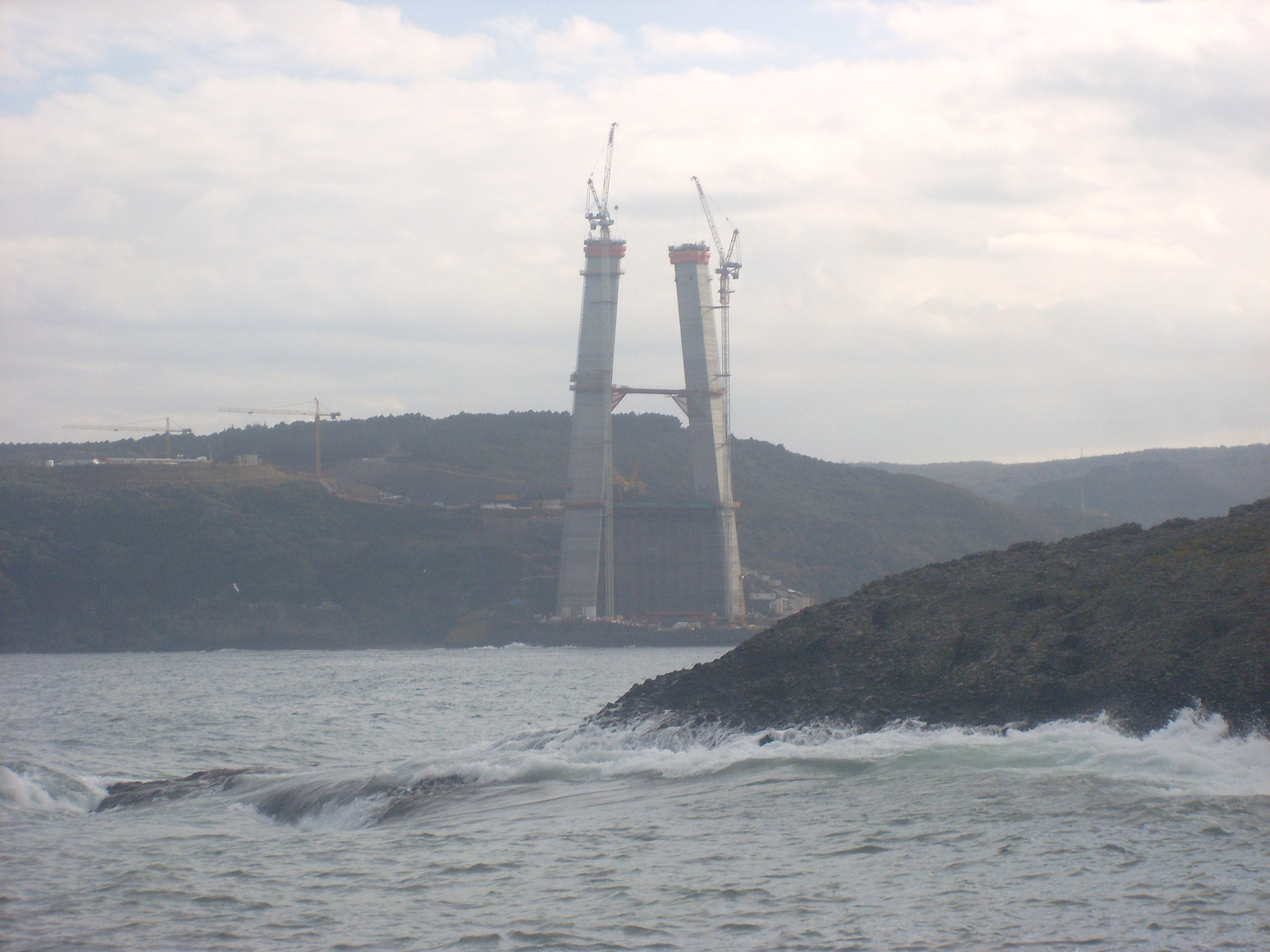
Poyrazköy pylons (view from Garipçe, Sarıyer in January 2014)

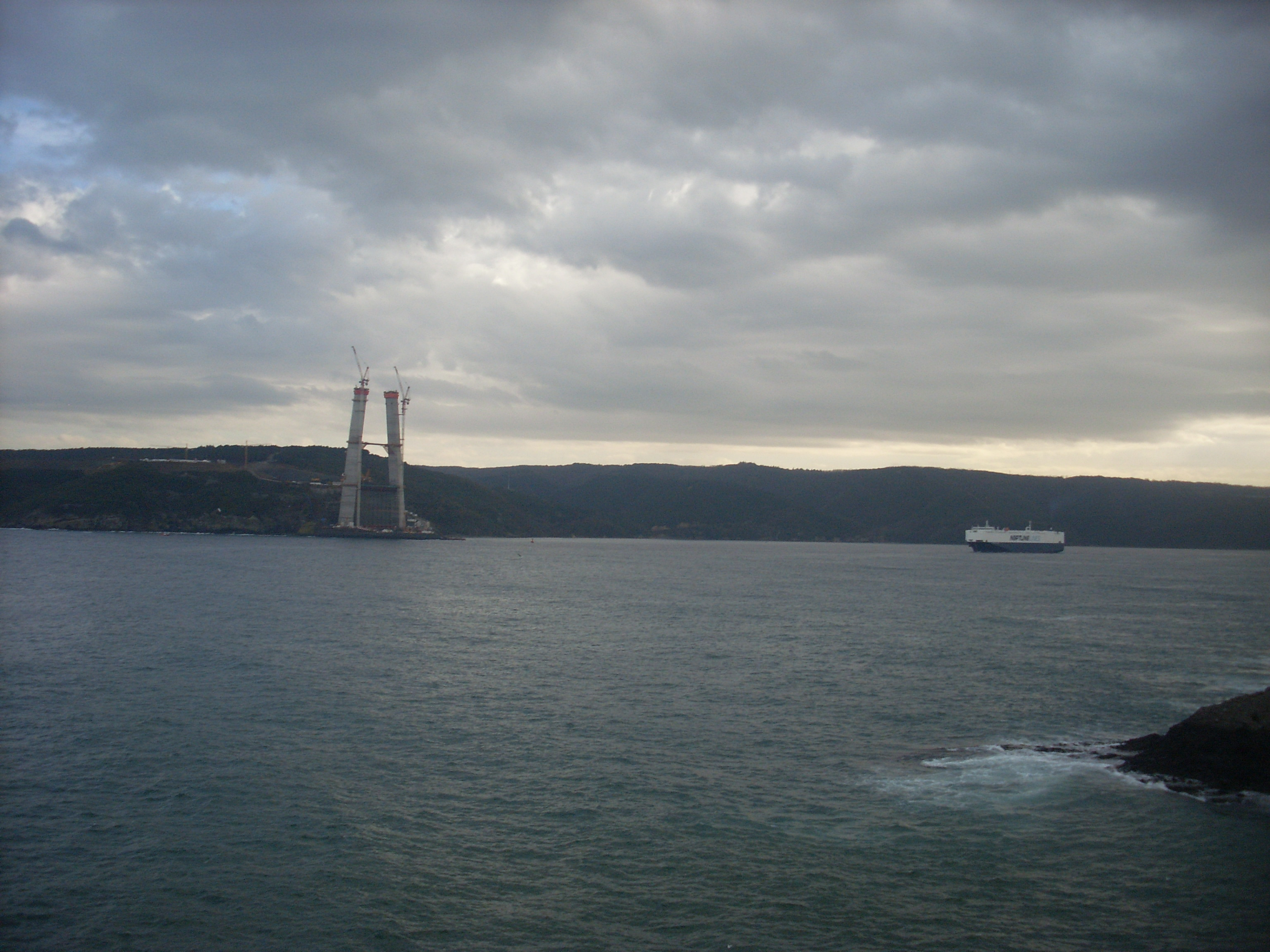
Poyrazköy pylons (view from Garipçe in January 2014)

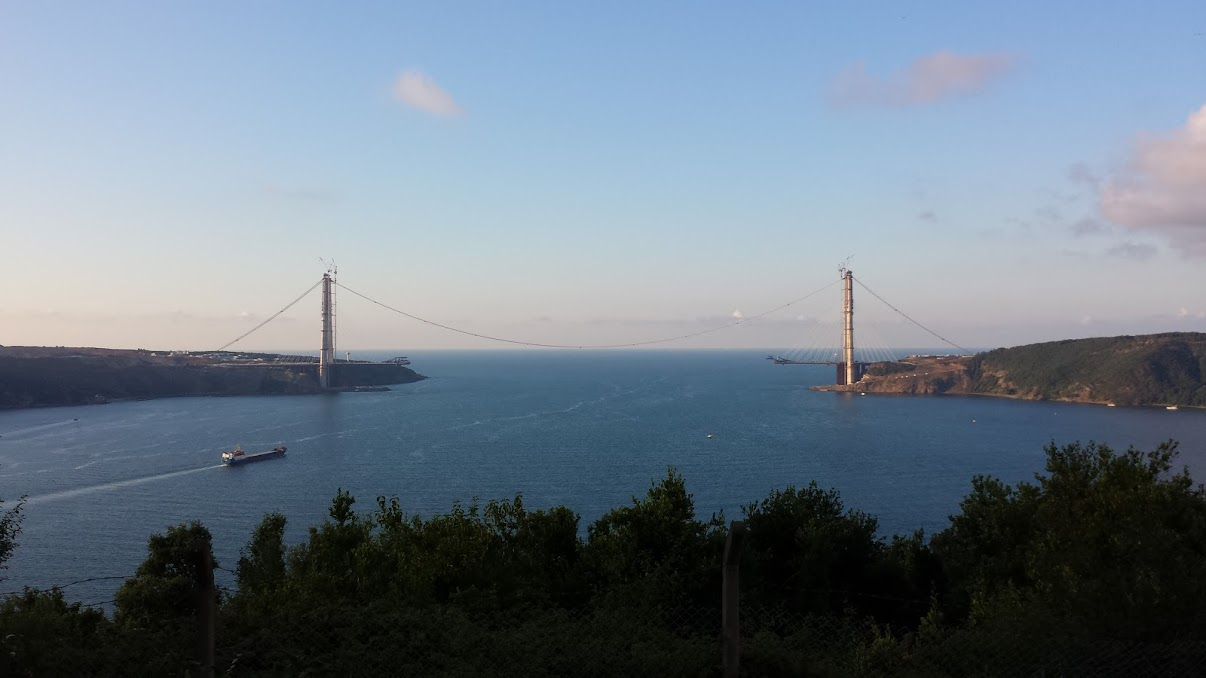
View from Anadolu Kavağı, July 2015

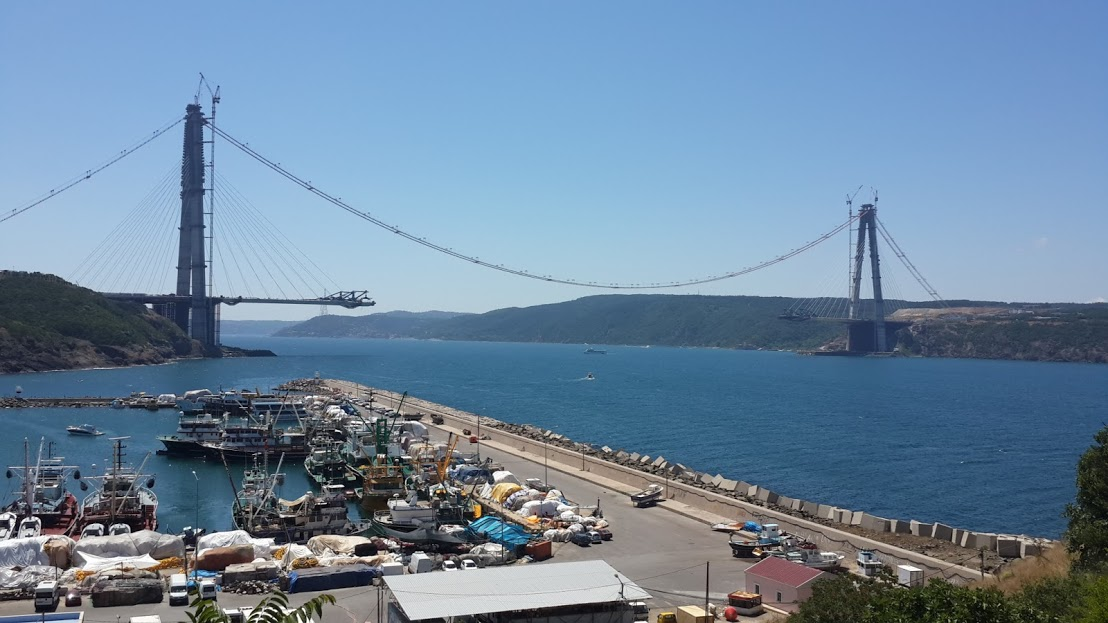
View from Poyrazköy, July 2015

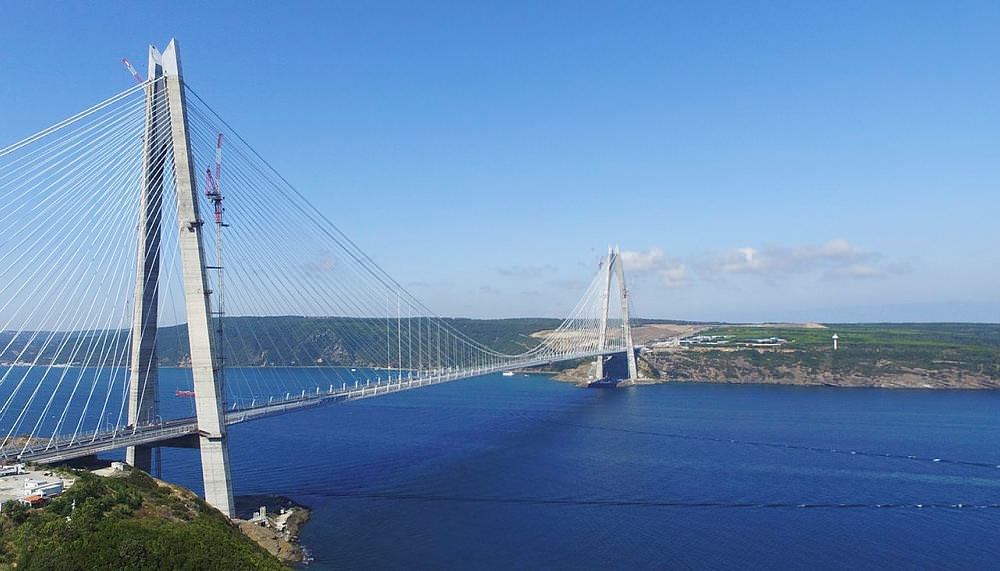
Yavuz Sultan Selim Bridge, 24 August 2016

== See also ==
- Istanbul Canal
- Istanbul Airport
- Bosphorus Bridge
- Fatih Sultan Mehmet Bridge
- Osman Gazi Bridge
- Çanakkale 1915 Bridge
- Eurasia Tunnel, undersea tunnel, crossing the Bosphorus for vehicular traffic, opened in December 2016.
- Marmaray, undersea rail tunnel connecting the Asian and European sides of Istanbul.
- Great Istanbul Tunnel, a proposed three-level road-rail undersea tunnel.
- Public transport in Istanbul
- Rail transport in Turkey
- Turkish Straits

== Sources ==
- Gürsoy, Defne; Ugur Hüküm (2006). Istanbul: Emergence d'une société civile (in French). Paris: Editions Autrement. ISBN 978-2746707979.
