= Poyrazköy =

- Neighbourhood
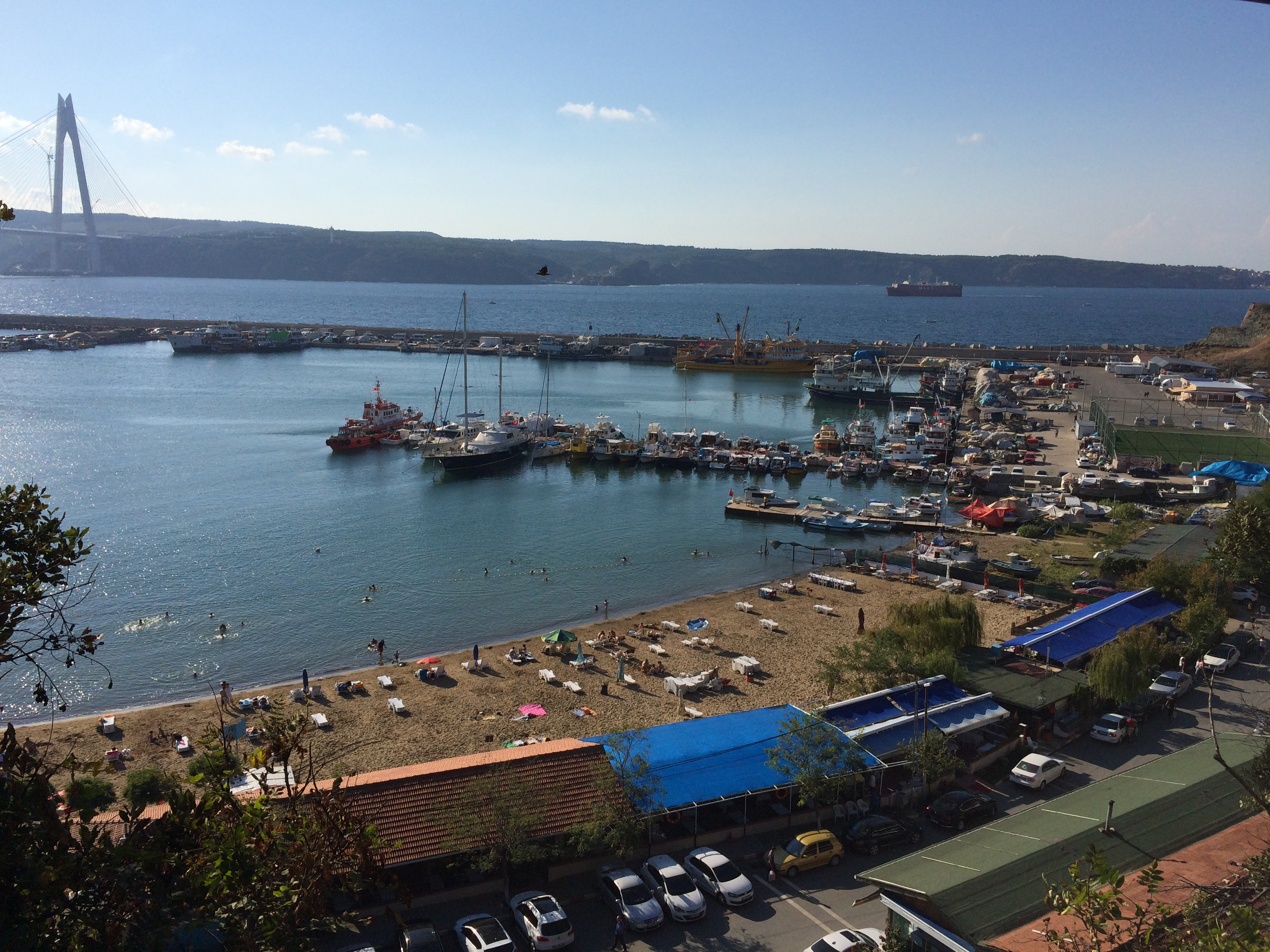
- Poyrazköy coast

- Location within Turkey Location within Istanbul
- Coordinates: 41.188592°N 29.130342°E
- Country: Turkey
- Province: Istanbul
- District: Beykoz
- Population (2022): 889
- Time zone: UTC+3 (TRT)

Poyrazköy is a neighbourhood in the municipality and district of Beykoz, Istanbul Province, Turkey. Its population is 889 (2022). Poyraz lies at the exit of the Bosporus into the Black Sea, on the Asian side of the Strait.

According to the Turkish government, the Yavuz Sultan Selim Bridge, the right-hand pillar of the third Bosporus bridge is located here. The pillar on the left is on the European side in the village of Garipçe. The bridge is completed by August 26, 2016.

== See also ==
- The Poyrazköy case
