= Beykoz =

- District and municipality
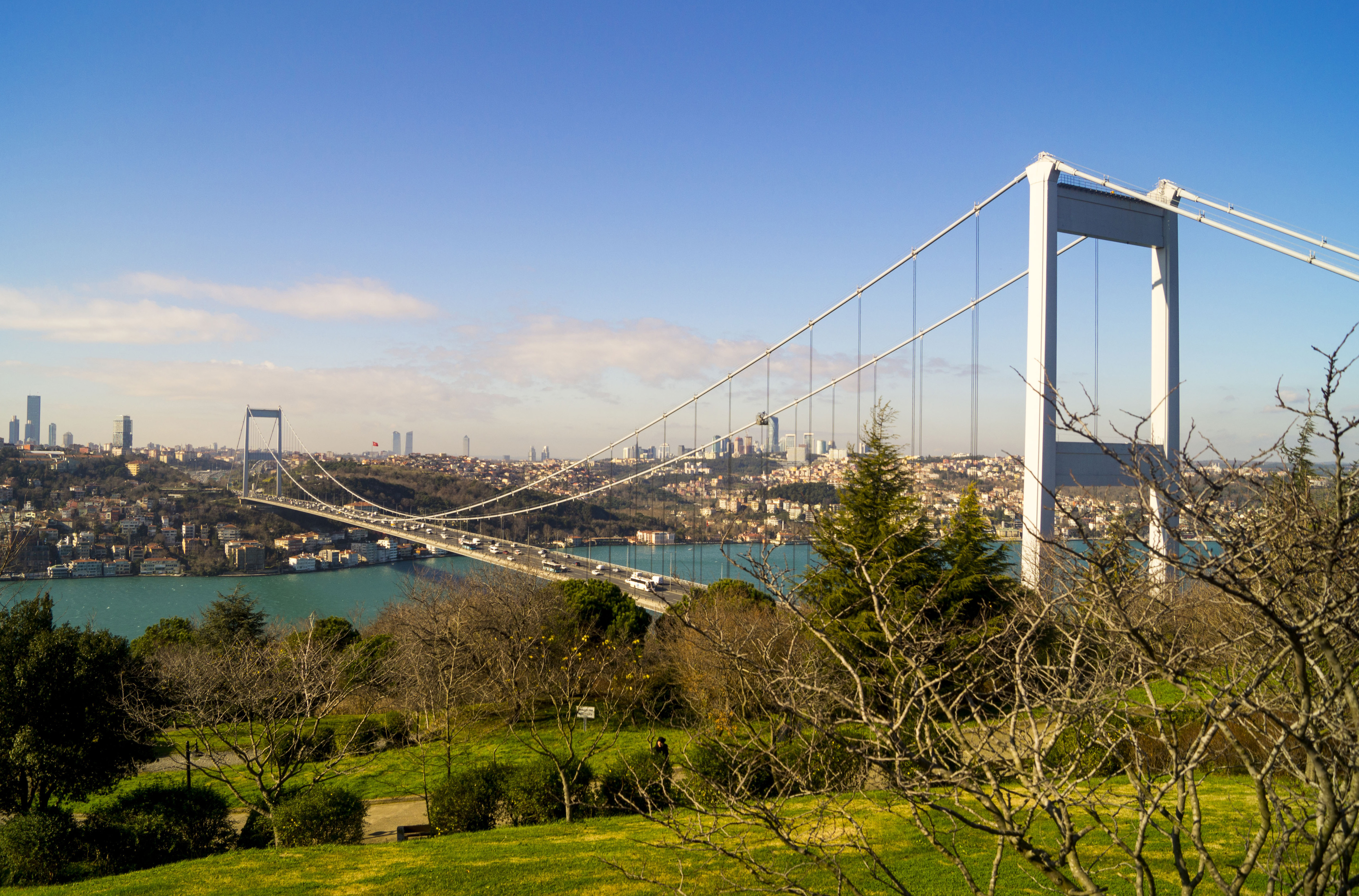
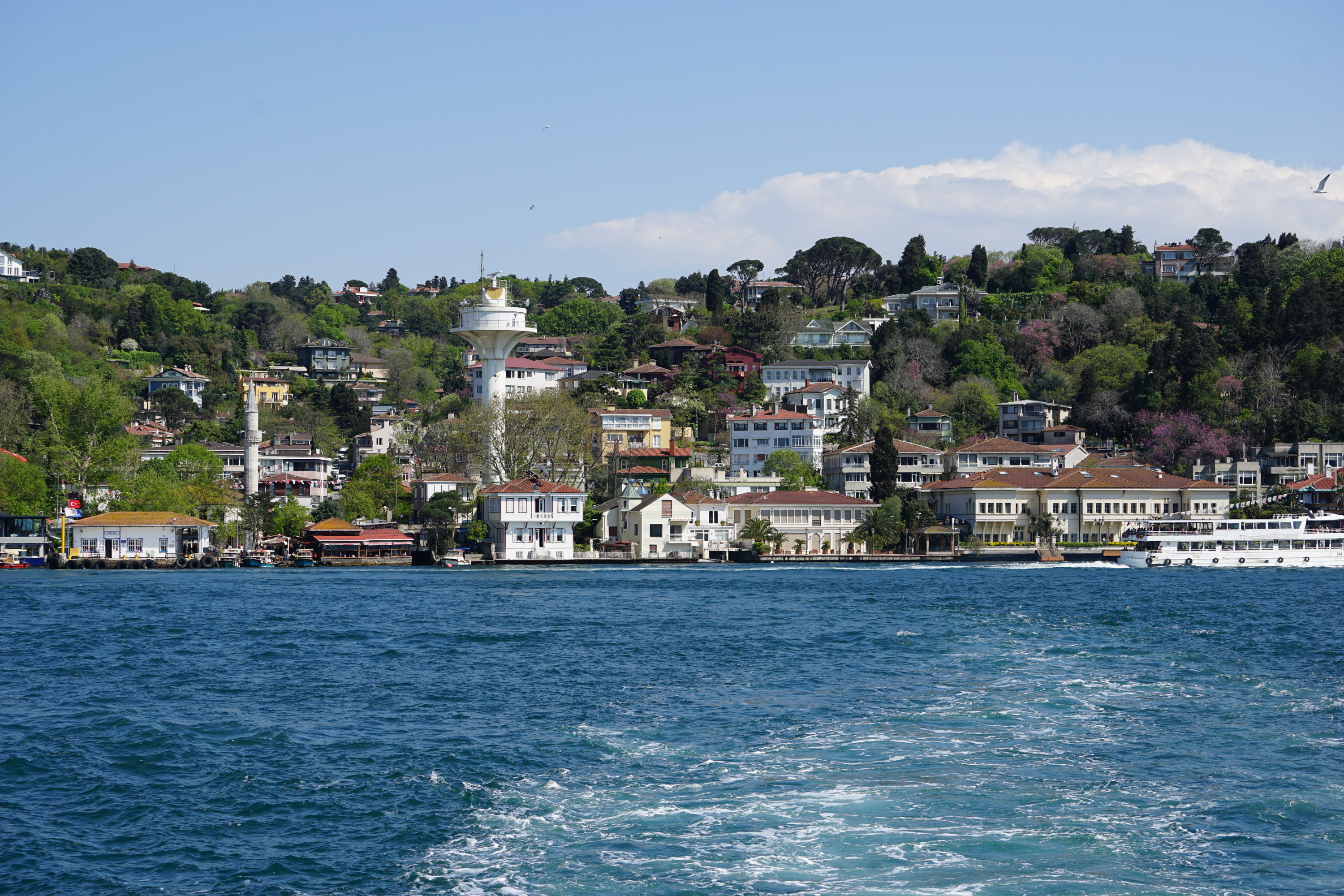
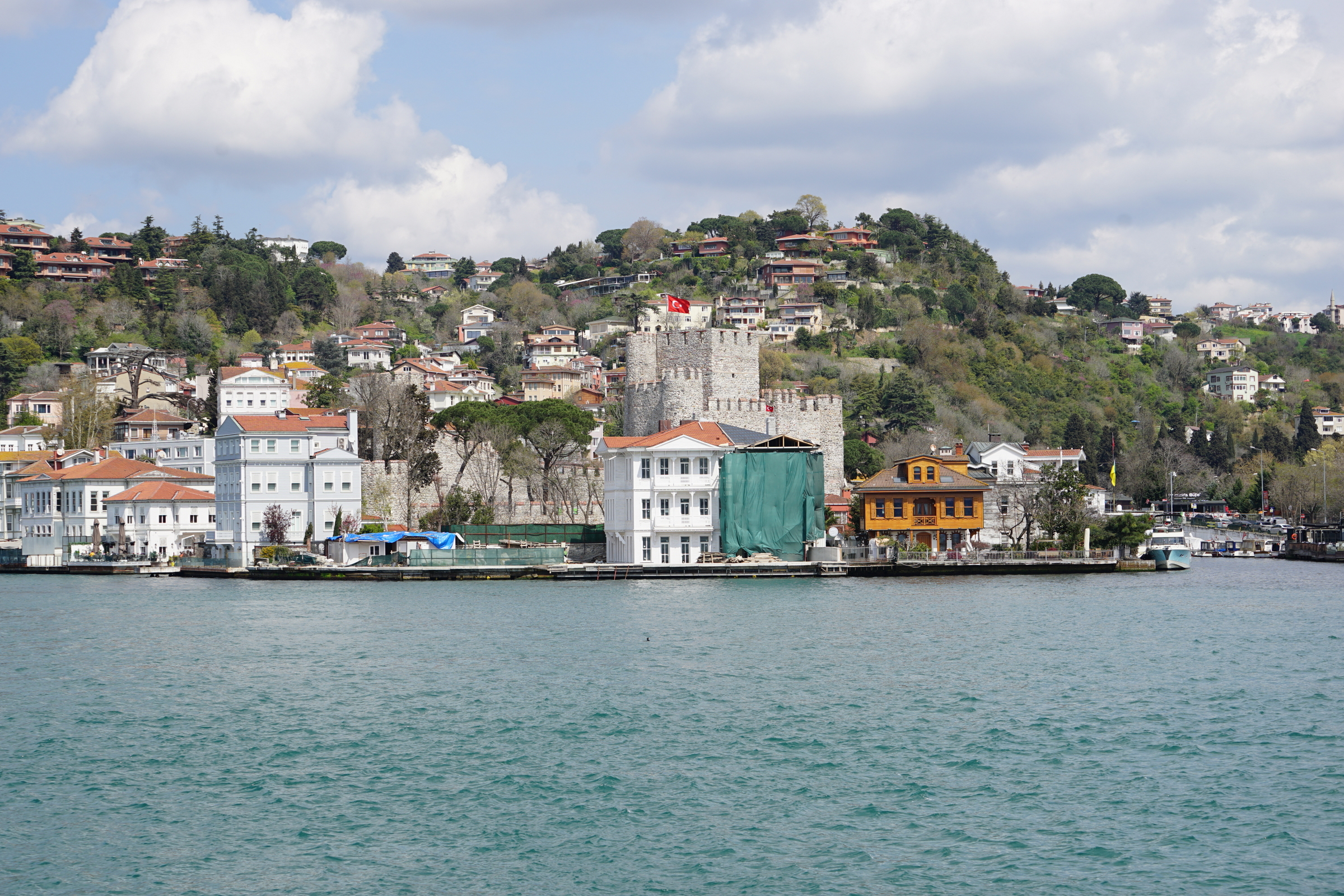
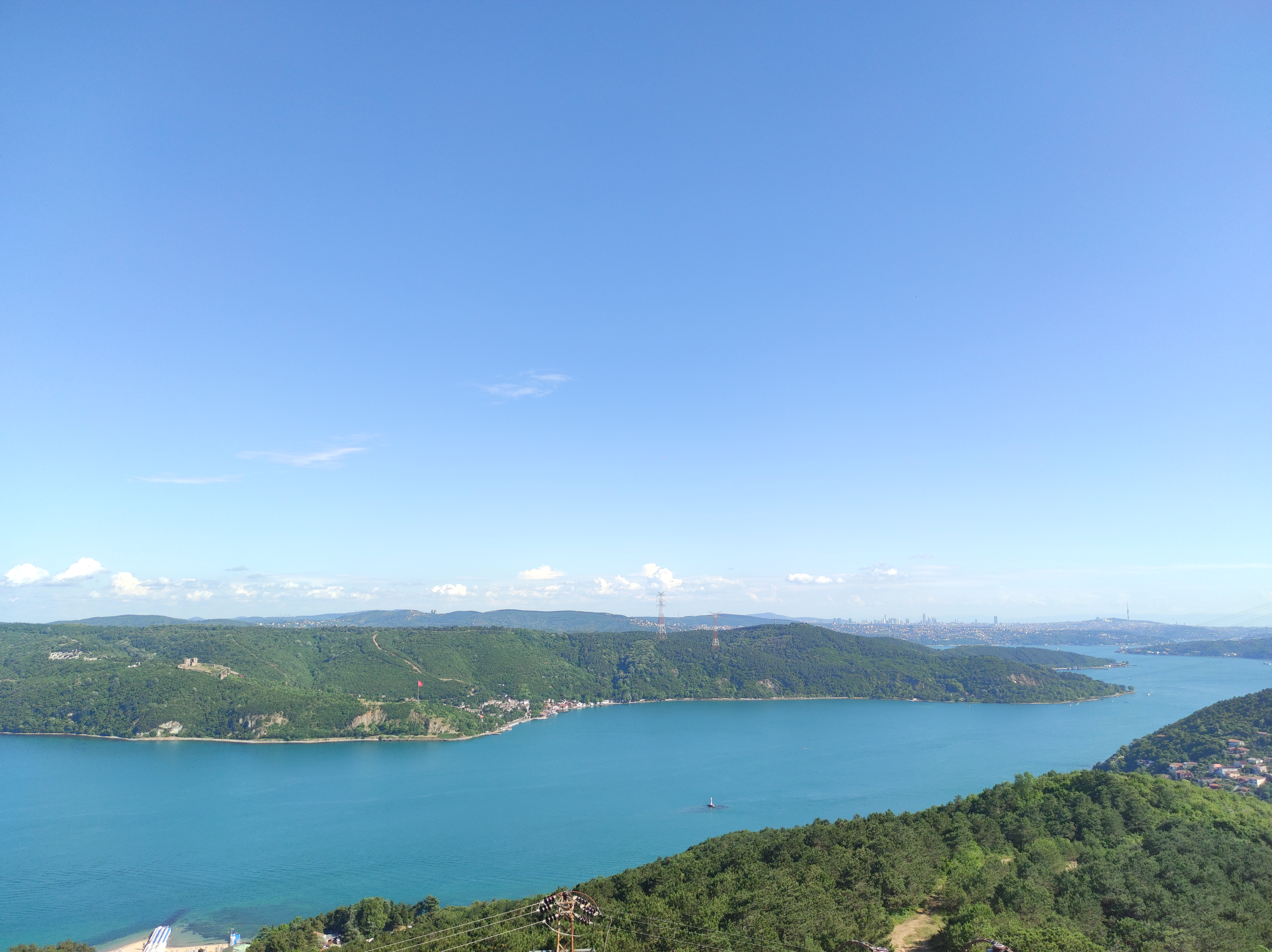
- Otağtepe Fatih park Kanlıca coast Anadoluhisarı Beykoz coast as seen from Sarıyer

- Logo

- Map showing Beykoz District in Istanbul Province

- Location within Turkey Location within Istanbul
- Coordinates: 41°08′03″N 29°05′32″E
- Country: Turkey
- Province: Istanbul

Government
  - Mayor: Özlem Vural Gürzel (acting) (AKP)
- Area: 310 km^{2} (120 sq mi)
- Population (2025): 246,833
  - Density: 800/km^{2} (2,100/sq mi)
- Time zone: UTC+3 (TRT)
- Area code: 0216
- Website: www.beykoz.bel.tr

Beykoz (Turkish pronunciation: [ˈbejkoz]) is a municipality and district of Istanbul Province, Turkey. Its area is 310 km^{2}, and its population is 246,833 (2025). It is located in the Anatolian Side, at the northern end of the Bosphorus. The name is believed to be a combination of the words bey and kos, which means "village" in Farsi. Beykoz includes an area from the streams of Küçüksu and Göksu (just before Anadoluhisarı) to the opening of the Bosphorus into the Black Sea, and the villages in the hinterland as far as the Riva creek. Before the Turkish alphabet reform of 1928, it was sometimes Latinized variously as Beicos or Beikos.

== History ==
The mouth of the Bosphorus in ancient times was used as a place of sacrifice, specifically to petition the Twelve Olympians, including Zeus and Poseidon, for a safe journey across the Black Sea, without which no one would venture into those stormy waters.

The first people to settle the upper Bosphorus were Thracians and Greeks, and the ancient name for the area was Amikos (Αμικός in Greek) or Amnicus (Αμνικός), named after a Thracian king. However, the area has changed hands many times since. As well as being a strategically important crossing point, the Bosphorus is rich in fish. Consequently, Beykoz has been invaded by groups from around and beyond the Black Sea: Thracians, Bithynians, Persians, Greeks, Romans, Byzantines, and finally Turks.

In the Ottoman period, the land behind Beykoz was open country and forest used for hunting and an escape from the city by the Sultans and their court. The hunting lodge at Küçüksu, as well as the fountains and mosques that decorate the villages along the coast, date from this era. The name Beykoz was established at this time and is thought to be derived from Bey (meaning prince, lord, or gentleman) and Koz (the Persian word for village). Koz is also a word for a type of walnut, which is another possible etymology.

Under Turkish control, the straits have retained their strategic value, and British troops assembled in Beykoz on their way to fight in the Crimea in 1854.

Later attempts were made to bring industry to the area, most importantly the glassworks at Paşabahçe, which began as small workshops in the 17th century and by the 18th and 19th centuries were a well-established factory making the ornate spiral-designed or semi-opaque white glassware known to collectors worldwide as 'Beykoz-ware'.

On the hillsides above the Bosphorus, Beykoz has always suffered from uncontrolled development, and large areas above the Bosphorus are covered in illegal housing, where migrants have come to live and work in glass and other industries. Areas like Çubuklu and Paşabahçe are continually struggling to build infrastructure to keep up with the housing being built illegally or semi-legally. Due to this incoming industrial workforce Beykoz has a working-class character unseen behind the luxury of the Bosphorus waterfront.

Now the illegal building is happening in the forests further back from the sea, particularly in the areas of Çavuşbaşı and Elmalı. This countryside is scattered with little villages, all of which are expanding now that more roads are being put through.

Not all new housing is unorganised, as Beykoz holds luxurious new developments in the Istanbul area, including the villa estates of Acarkent and Beykoz Konaklar, home to filmstars, members of parliament, and other Istanbul glitterati.

Beykoz has a small fishing community (although the main fishing fleet is based in Istanbul itself). The fish restaurants at Anadolu Kavağı in particular have sprung up to serve day trippers from the Bosphorus tours by ferryboat.

== Cultural Sites ==
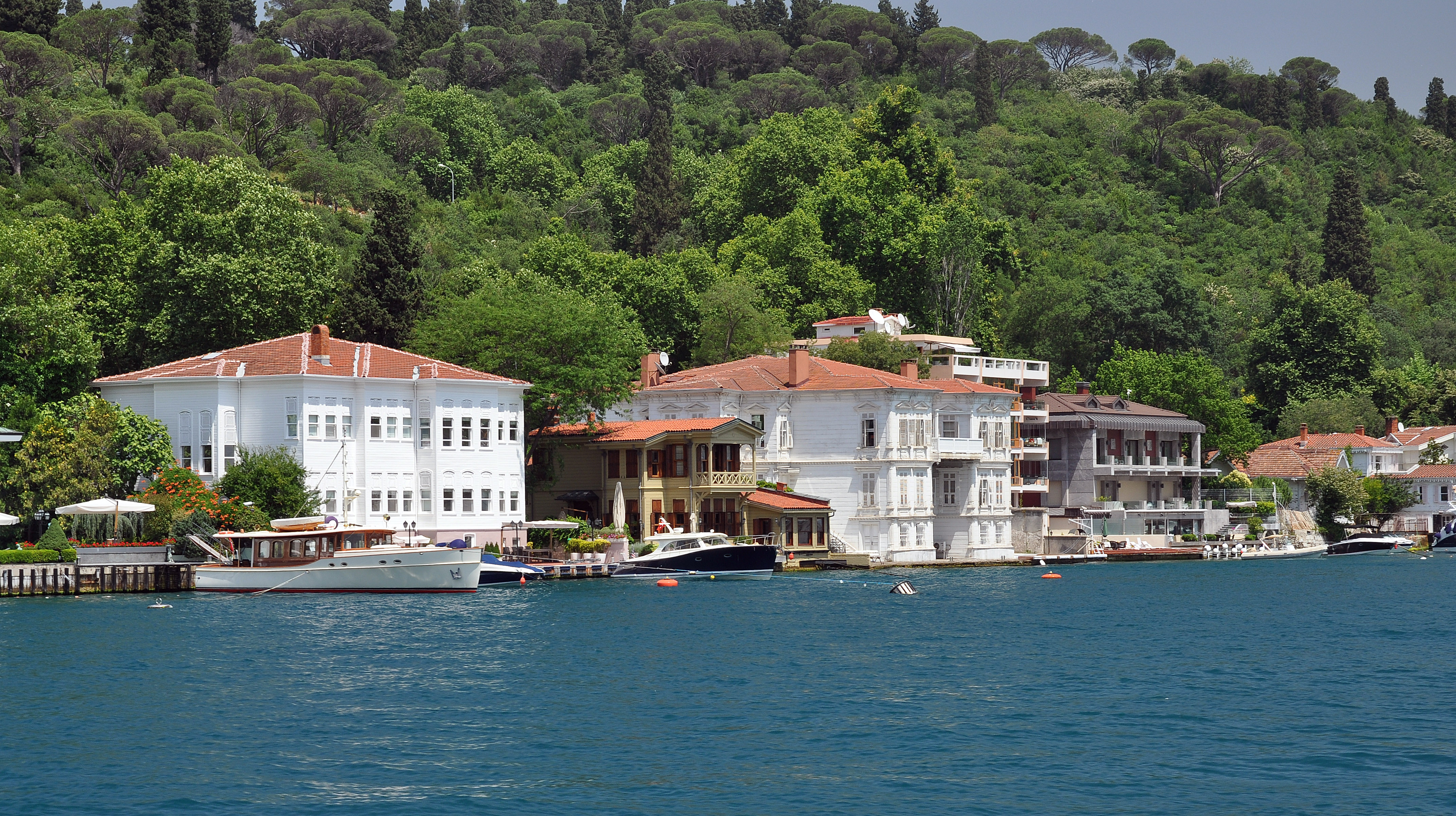
Ottoman era yalı houses in Kanlıca, Beykoz, on the Anatolian shore of the Bosphorus strait.

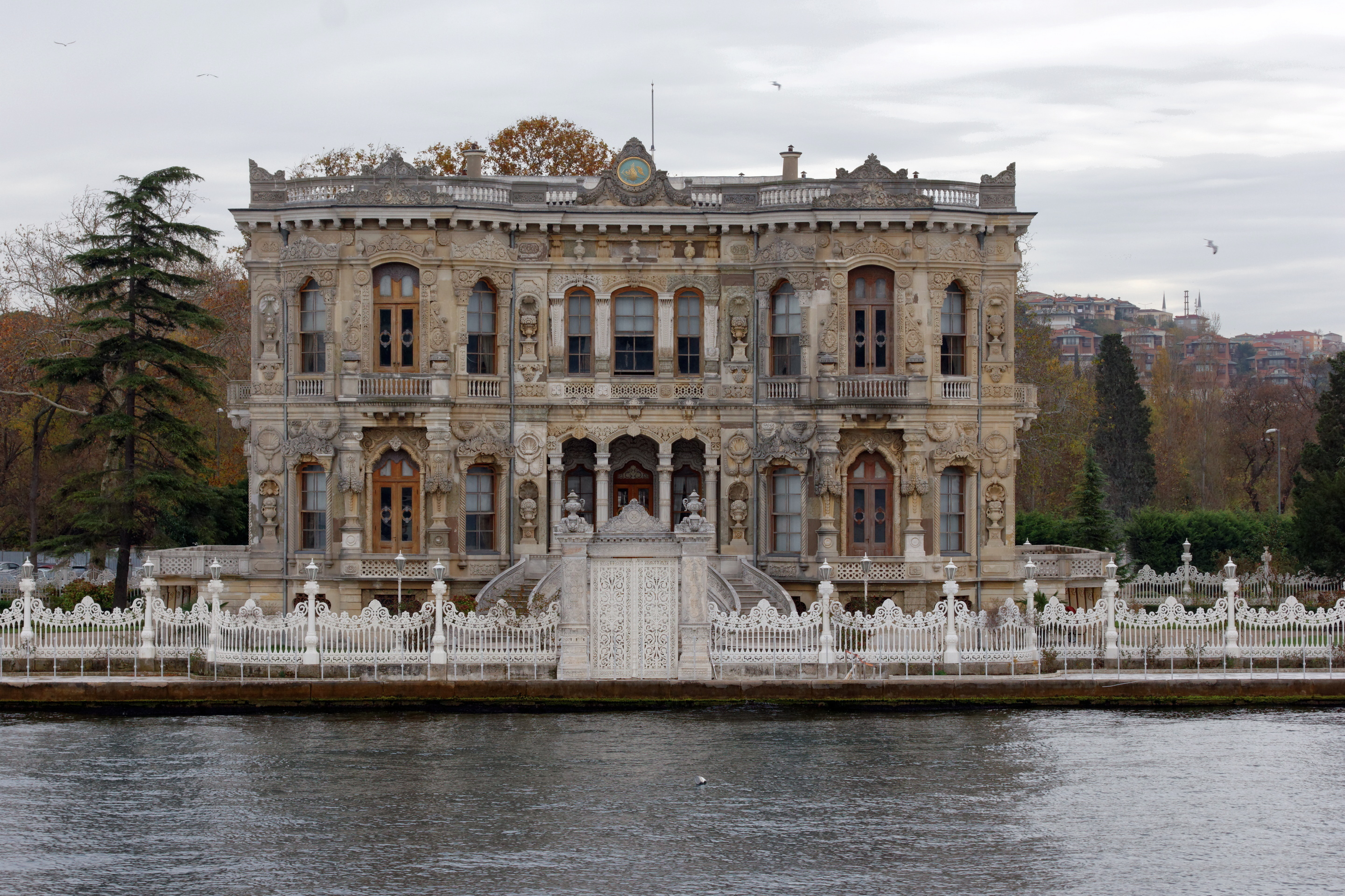
Küçüksu Pavilion

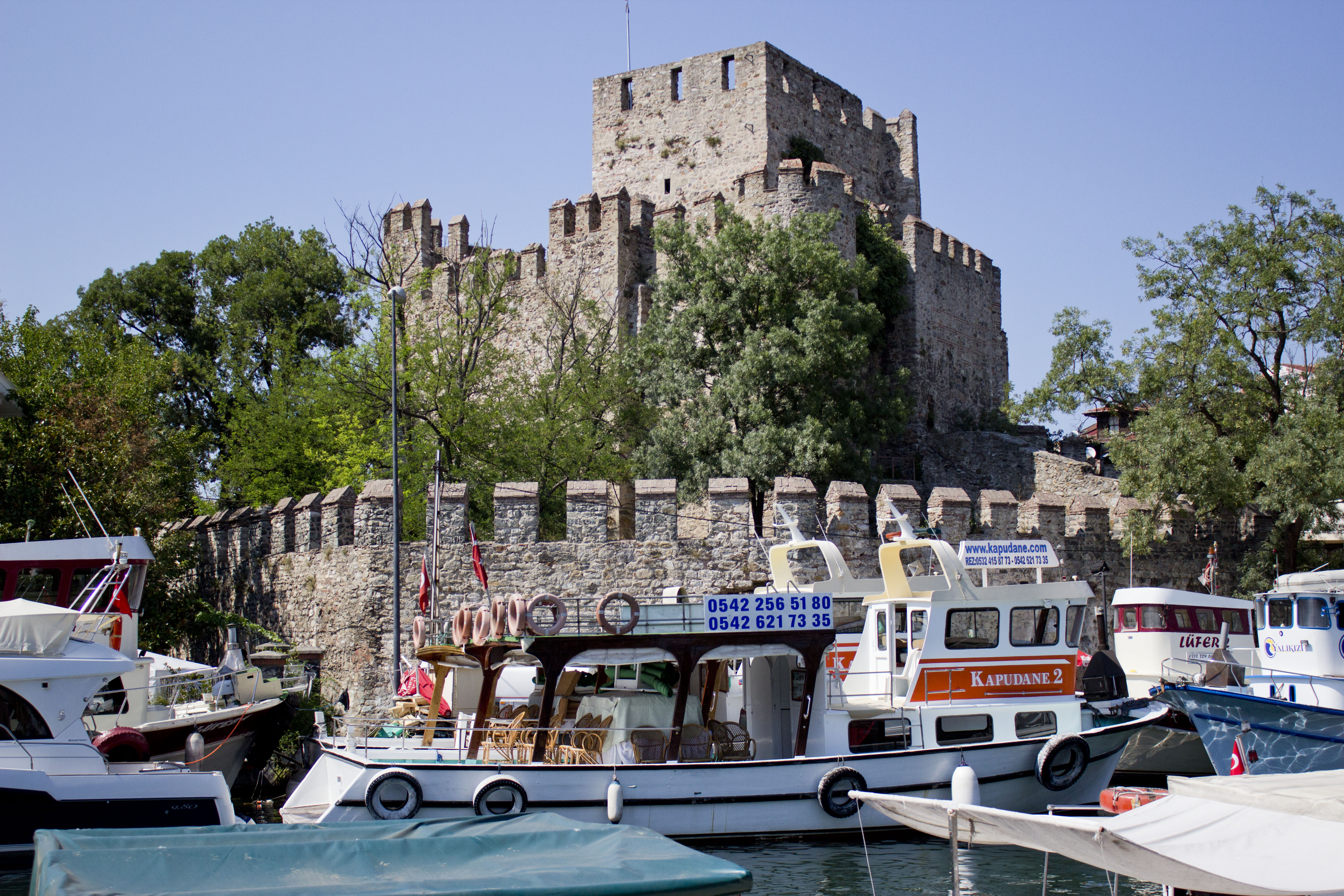
Anadoluhisarı fort as seen from the coast

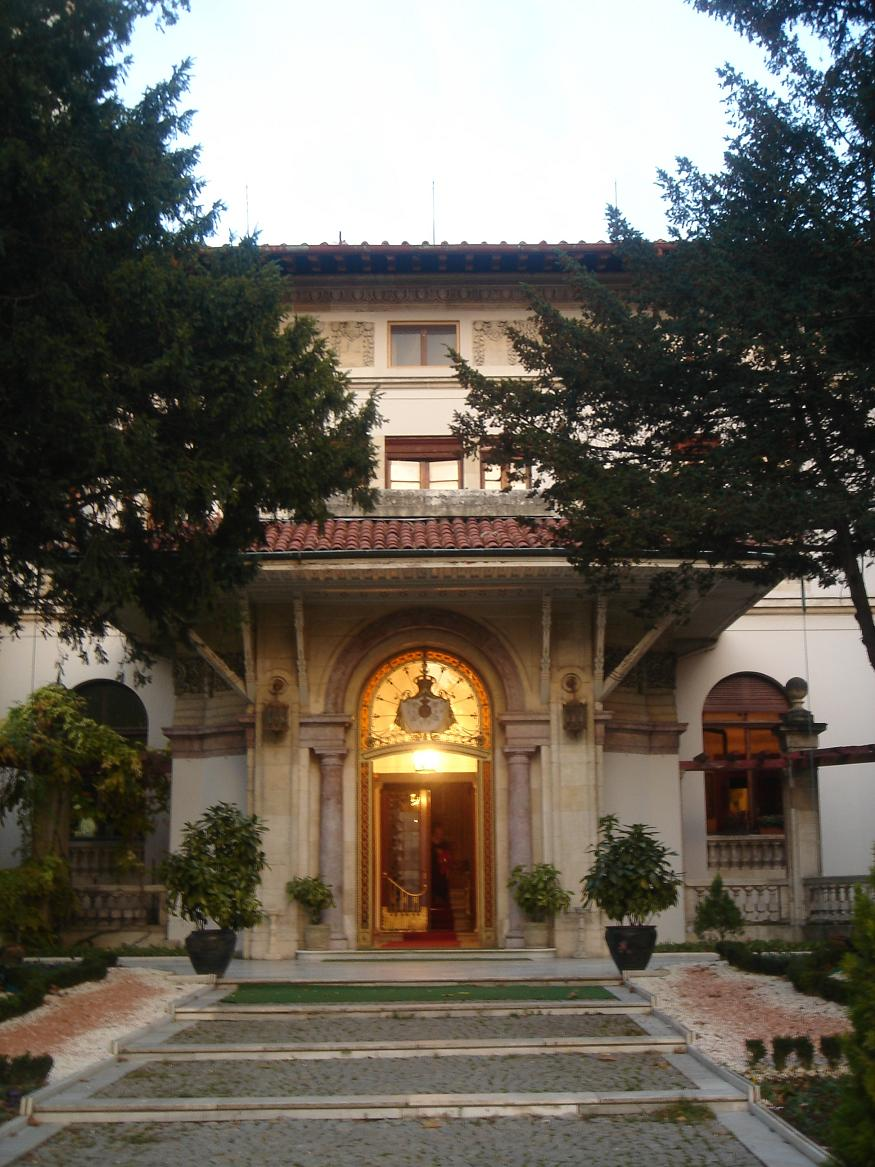
Egyptian Khedive Palace Entrance

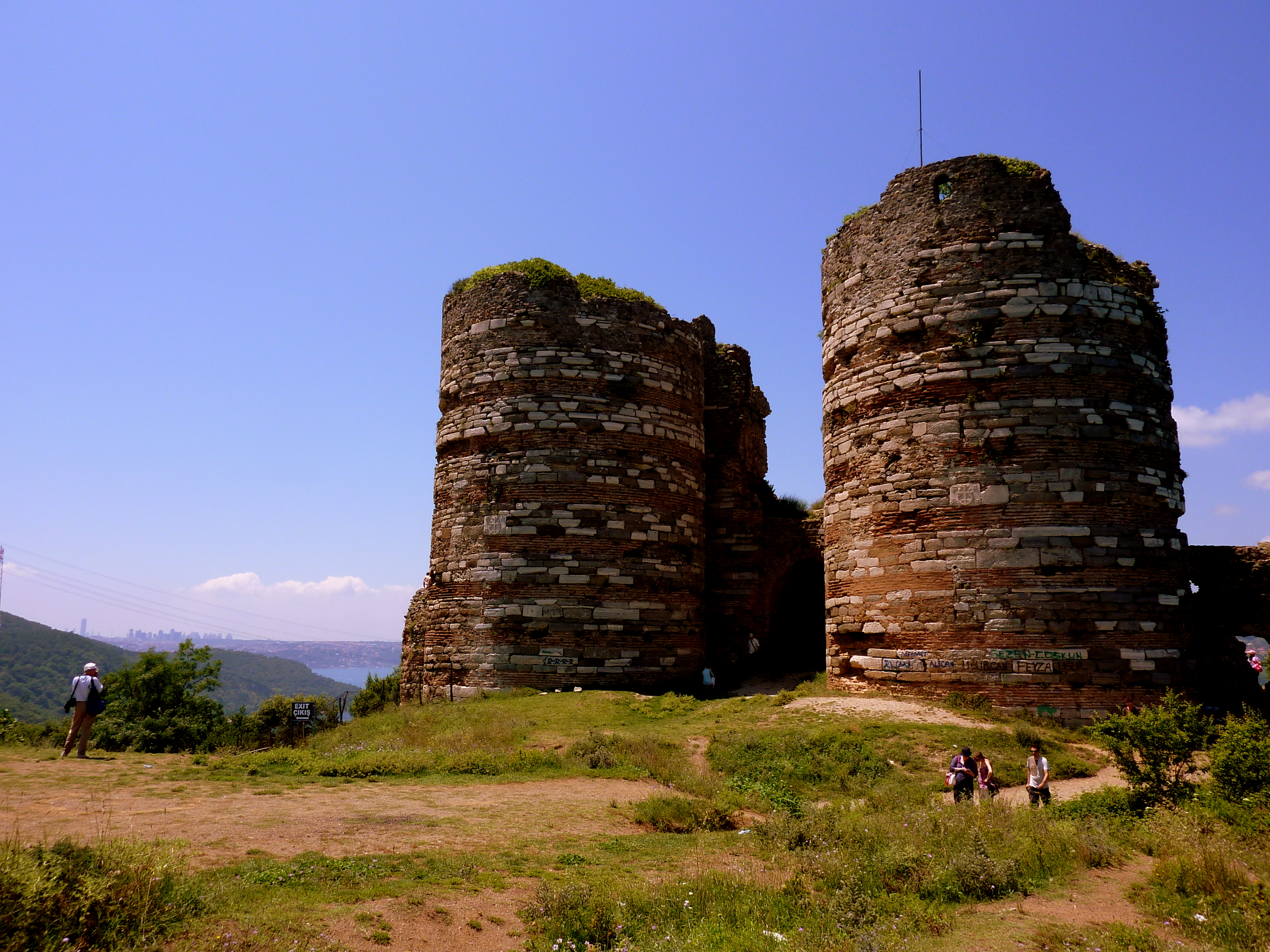
The main gate of Yoros Castle

The Bosphorus coastal road runs up to Beykoz from Beylerbeyi (below the Bosphorus Bridge) and there are roads down to the coast from the Fatih Sultan Mehmet Bridge as well. The district can also be reached by a ferry over the water from Eminönü, Beşiktaş. Smaller boats go from Yeniköy to Beykoz, Bebek or Emirgan to the neighborhoods of Kanlıca and Anadolu Hisarı.

Three of the most distinctive buildings from Bosphorus to Beykoz include Küçüksu Palace, a classic Ottoman imperial hunting lodge, the castle of Anadolu Hisarı, and older site which was constructed by the Ottomans during the buildup to the conquest to secure the Bosphorus for the Turkish armies; The final and most recent, near Kanlıca, is Khedive Palace, built in 1907 as the holiday home of the Khedive of Egypt. Khedive Palace is now a restaurant set in a park. Kanlıca and Anadolu Hisarı are villages with cafes on the waterfront popular among tourists.

Along the coast are some of the most expensive and largest houses in the city, some of which are homes of elite Turkish politicians. Some of the huge wooden Ottoman seaside houses called yalı can be found from Anadoluhisarı up to Beykoz itself. The attraction of living by the water the large areas of forest parkland on hillside along much of this coast make the Beykoz waterfront a peaceful retreat from the city.

Much of the coast is built on unfortunately, and the buses that drive the coast road are a law unto themselves but there are still plenty of spots on the waterfront to eat, drink, fish, or just sit. In places such as Yalıköy, there are boats moored up selling grilled mackerel.

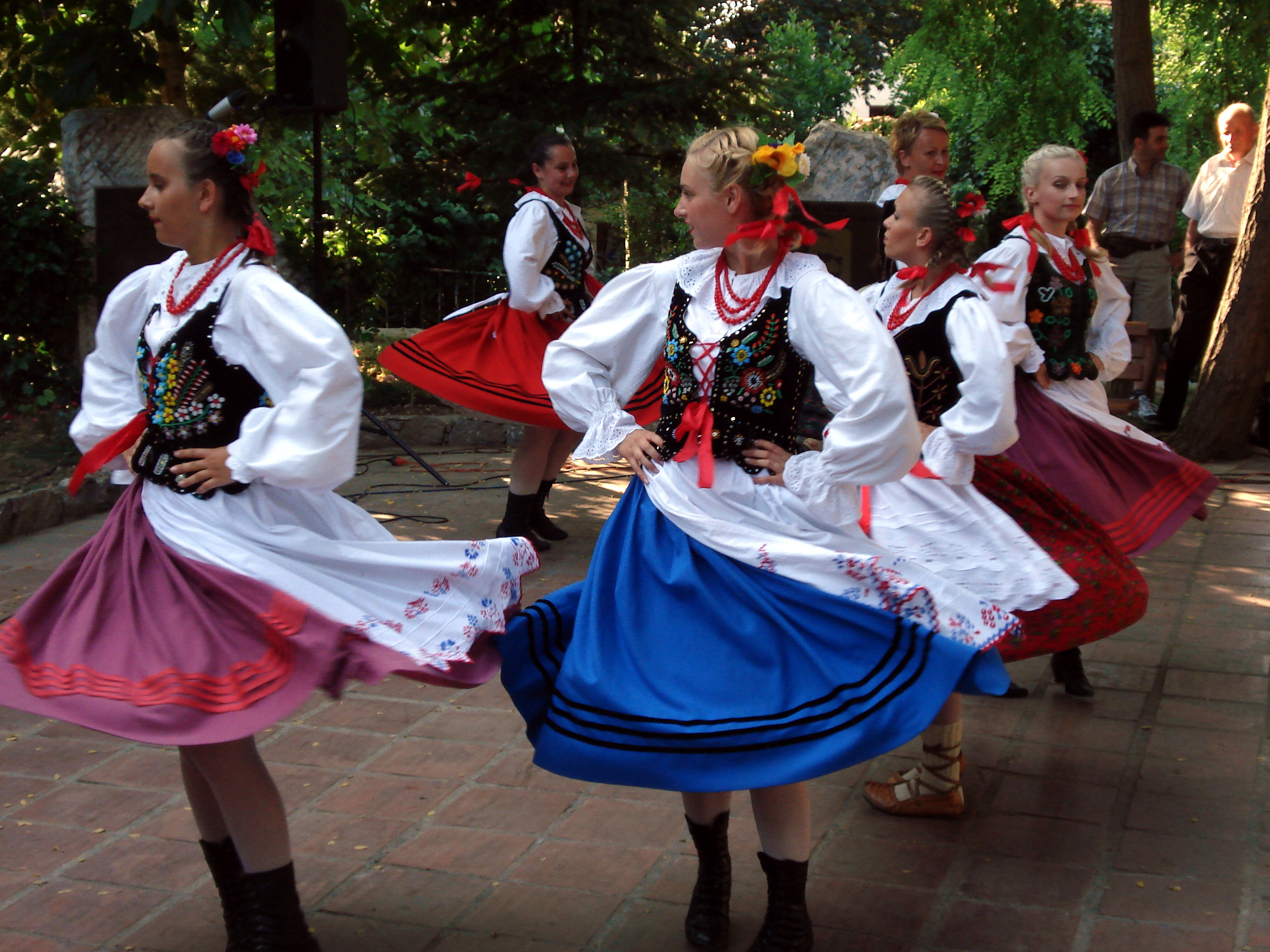
Polish festival in Polonezköy (meaning Polish Village), located at a densely forested area of Beykoz (Polonezköy Nature Park).

In Beykoz city center itself there is a large park on the hillside (Beykoz Korusu), and an attractive Ottoman fountain with running water built by Ishak Aga in the main square, known locally as On Çeşmeler, Ten Fountains. The town centre also has a village feel to it, with smallish, aging buildings, many of them houses rather than blocks of flats, especially on the hills that climb up away from the coast. Being far from city infrastructure, public transit is taking time to arrive, but the general peacefulness of neighbourly relations and the possibility of a Bosphorus view more than compensate.

Beyond Beykoz, there are large areas of forested countryside, where the people of Istanbul come for picnics on weekends. This is when Beykoz suffers some of the traffic congestion that plagues the city as a whole.

Some popular picnic spots include: The upper Bosphorus villages of Anadolu Kavağı, Anadolufeneri, and Poyrazköy. In Anadolufeneri, the historical lighttower Anadolu Feneri can be visited. Kavak being particularly popular as the last stop on the Bosphorus ferry cruises, where people stop to eat fish and walk up to the castle on the hill. Fener and Poyraz are smaller but very pleasant fishing villages; The Black Sea village of Riva; where you can swim but you must be careful as this is near the mouth of the Bosphorus and sometimes there are dangerous currents which causes risk of drowning.

The inland around and between Cumhuriyet Köyü, Alibahadır, Değirmendere, Akbaba, Dereseki, and Polonezköy are all popular retreats, and new roads were paved to service the luxury housing that is going up in places. Construction of the third bridge on the Bosporus, Yavuz Sultan Selim Bridge, and the second one to run through Beykoz district, further caused prices of real estate to soar.

There are a number of tombs of Muslim saints and holy places that also attract visitors, particularly the tomb of Joshua on a hill just before Anadolu Kavağı. The grave is that of Prophet Yusha, the successor to Prophet Musa.

== Neighbourhoods in Beykoz ==
There are 45 neighbourhoods in Beykoz District:

- Acarlar
- Akbaba
- Alibahadır
- Anadoluhisarı
- Anadolukavağı
- Anadolufeneri
- Baklacı
- Beykoz Merkez
- Bozhane
- Çamlıbahçe
- Çengeldere
- Çiftlik
- Çiğdem
- Çubuklu
- Cumhuriyet
- Dereseki
- Elmalı
- Fatih
- Göksu
- Göllü
- Görele
- Göztepe
- Gümüşsuyu
- İncirköy
- İshaklı
- Kanlıca
- Kavacık
- Kaynarca
- Kılıçlı
- Mahmutşevketpaşa
- Öğümce
- Örnekköy
- Ortaçeşme
- Paşabahçe
- Paşamandıra
- Polonezköy
- Poyrazköy
- Riva
- Rüzgarlıbahçe
- Soğuksu
- Tokatköy
- Yalıköy
- Yavuz Selim
- Yeni Mahalle
- Zerzavatçı

== Education ==
Beykoz district is home to four universities, Beykoz University, Boğaziçi University, Istanbul Medipol University, and Turkish-German University.

== Sport ==
The headquarters of the Turkish Football Federation (TFF) is located at TFF Riva Facility in the Riva Neighborhhod. The THF Serdar Seymen Handball Hall of the Turkish Handball Federation (THF) is located in the Bykoz Forest at Baklacı Neighnorhood.
