= Paşabahçe, Beykoz =

Paşabahçe
- Neighbourhood
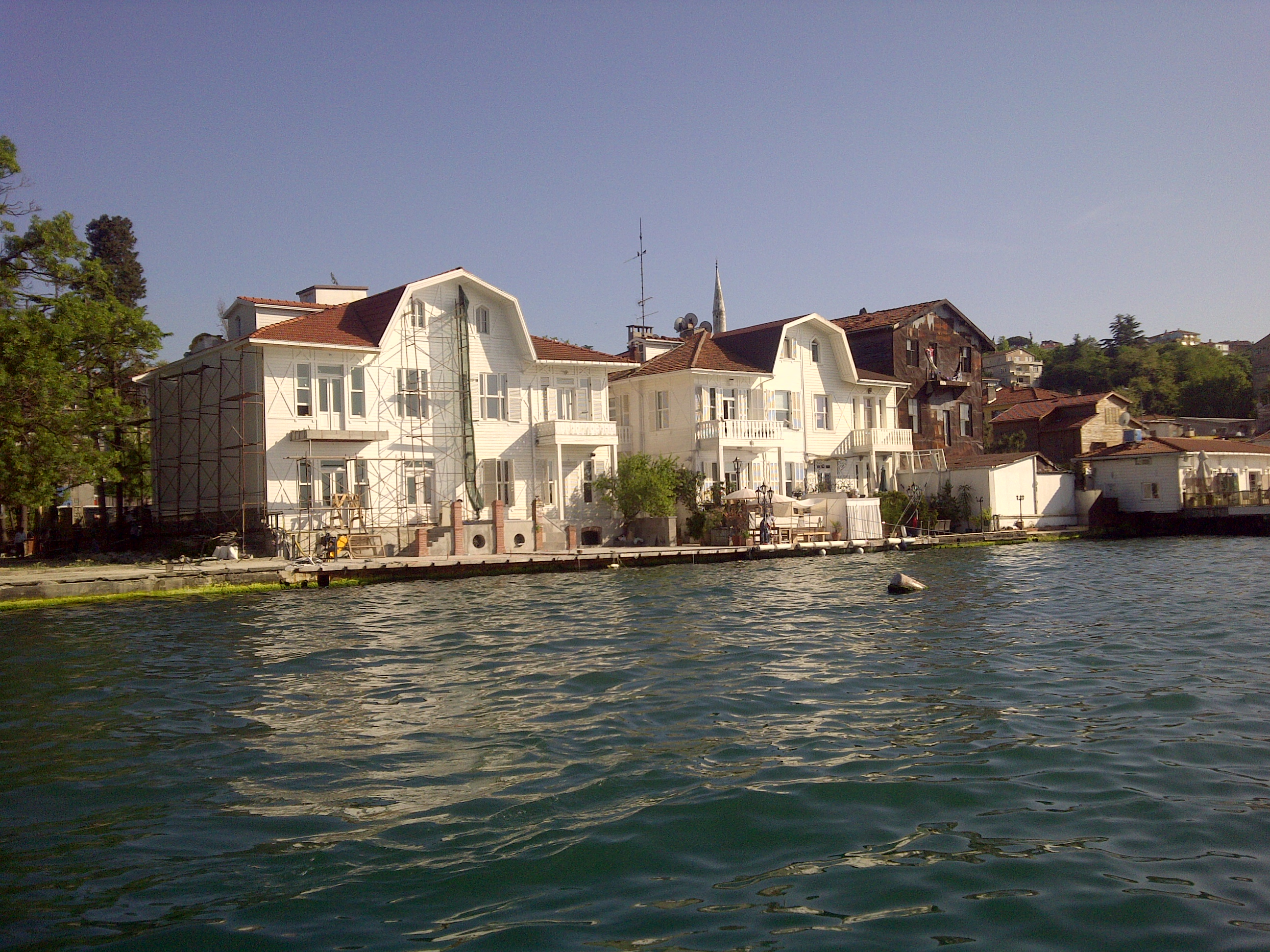
- A group of seaside residences in Paşabahçe

- Location within Turkey Location within Istanbul
- Coordinates: 41°06′56″N 29°05′33″E
- Country: Turkey
- Province: Istanbul
- District: Beykoz
- Population (2022): 3,717
- Time zone: UTC+3 (TRT)
- Postal code: 34800
- Area code: 0216

Paşabahçe is a neighbourhood in the municipality and district of Beykoz, Istanbul Province, Turkey. Its population is 3,717 (2022). It is located on the Anatolian side of the Bosphorus.

Paşabahçe is a remote settlement in Istanbul. The village was once inhabited only by non-Muslims. Grand vizier Hezarpare Ahmed Pasha (in office 1647–1648) built here a palace-like mansion with a wide yard. Hence the name "Paşabahçe", literally "Pasha's Yard". Later, Sultan Mustafa III (r. 1757-1753) built a school, a mosque, a hamam (Turkish bathhouse) and a fountain in the location, and settled Muslim Turks around the buildings. Even though the Christian population declined over the time, it did not disappear completely. In 1894, a Greek Orthodox church named Agios Konstantinos was built. There is also a holy well (Turkish: ayazma from Greek: ἁγίασμα, hagiasm). In the 19th century, there were seven yalıs, waterfront mansions, one mosque, two churches, two bakeries, one mill and a fishing weir. During this period, workshops for glassware, porcelain ware and candle production. The foundation of an alcohol factory in 1922 and a glassware factory in 1934 contributed to the rapid increase of the population in the settlement.

Situated at a bay, Paşabahçe features public parks and restaurants at the seashore. It is popular recreational place for residents of Istanbul.

The MS Paşabahçe, which bears this name, is a passenger ship that has been operated by city passenger ferry lines company "Şehir Hatları". on multiple passenger ferry routes in the Sea of Marmara since 1952.

The name of the place has become a trade mark as "Paşabahçe" for glassware products.
