= Örnekköy =

- Neighbourhood
- Location within Turkey Location within Istanbul
- Coordinates: 41°09′N 29°09′E
- Country: Turkey
- Province: Istanbul
- District: Beykoz
- Elevation: 205 m (673 ft)
- Population (2026): 4,345
- Time zone: UTC+3 (TRT)
- Postal code: 34829
- Area code: 0216

Örnekköy is a neighborhood in the municipality and district of Beykoz, Istanbul Province, Turkey. It is situated on steep slopes in the forests of the Anatolian (Asian) side of Istanbul, in an active landslide area. Its population is 4,345 (2026).

Örnekköy is approximately 6 kilometres (3.7 mi) east of the center of Beykoz. It is bordered on the north by the Dereseki neighborhood, on the southeast by the Mahmutşevketpaşa and Zervezatçı neighborhoods, and on the southwest by the Elmalı neighborhood. Within Örnekköy are the smaller neighborhoods of Tepetarla, Yeni Mahalle, Toygar, Şirindere, and Tahtaköprü.

== History ==
Starting in the 1950s, employees of large factories in the area, such as Paşabahçe Glass, began settling in forested areas of Beykoz east of Elmalı. This neighborhood was made administratively separate from Elmalı in 2001 and named Örnekköy. At various times, internal migrants from the Black Sea region, including Rize, Kastamonu, Trabzon, and Giresun, settled in Örnekköy.

== Economy ==
Most residents work in the Beykoz district center. However, some residents also engage in agriculture and animal husbandry. Primary crops are hazelnuts, kale (karalahana), and beans.
