= Paşamandıra =

Neighborhood in Istanbul, Turkey

Coordinates: 41°11′N 29°14′E

Paşamandıra is a neighborhood in the district of Beykoz, on the Anatolian side of Istanbul, Turkey. Its population is 1,373 (2026).

It is bordered on the northeast by the Riva and Göllü neighborhoods, on the southeast by the Öğümce neighborhood, on the west by the Mahmutşevketpaşa neighborhood, and on the northwest by the Alibahadır neighborhood. It is divided by the Northern Marmara Motorway, which runs through the neighborhood southeast to northwest.

== Name ==
The name of the neighborhood means literally "pasha dairy" (Turkish: paşa ("pasha") + mandıra ("dairy")). The village was established on farmland that had once belonged to Abraham Pasha.

== History ==
In the last half of the 19th century, Abraham Pasha (Abraham Eremyan) acquired ownership of large tracts of land in Beykoz. However, Abraham Pasha later experienced financial difficulties, and rumors reached the Ottoman state that he might sell his land to Russians. In 1887, a decree was issued authorizing a formal survey of his lands, in which the area now known as Paşamandıra seems to have been listed as Paşa Manda Çiftliği (Pasha Water Buffalo Farm). The survey was completed in 1890, and in 1891, the lands were taken into the sultan's private treasury (Hazîne-i Hâssa).

In 1895, while seeking land on which to settle refugees (muhacir) from Bosnia, the Ottoman state scrutinized land in Beykoz previously belonging to Abraham Pasha. The portion known as Paşa Mandıra was deemed unsuitable because of its poor weather, lack of drinking water, and proneness to winter flooding. Nevertheless, in 1908, refugees from Romania requested settlement in Paşa Mandıra; it is not clear whether the state granted their request.

The present village was founded after the 1923 Population Exchange, with the settlement of 800 Muslims from Greece. Eventually, however, these settlers moved elsewhere, and the village was settled in the 1950s by migrants from the regions of Kastamonu and Trabzon.
