= Amycus (Bithynia) =

Coastal town of ancient Bithynia

Coordinates: 41°08′07″N 29°05′29″E

Amycus or Amykos (Ancient Greek: Ἄμυκος) was a coastal town of ancient Bithynia located on the Bosphorus.

Its site is located near Beykoz in Asiatic Turkey.
