= Polonezköy =

Polish village in Istanbul, Turkey

Polonezköy Adampol
- Neighbourhood
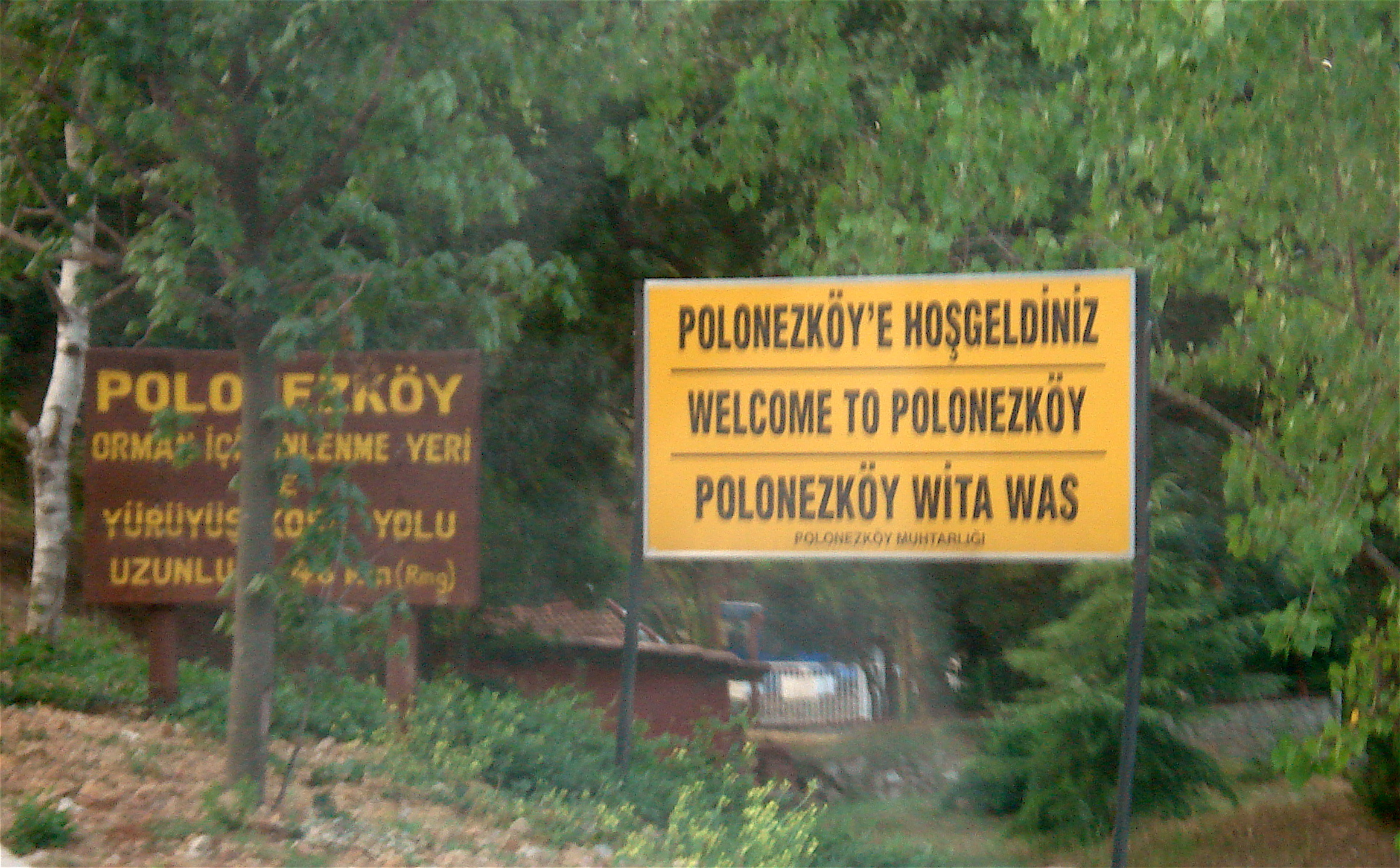
- Trilingual welcome sign in Turkish, English, and Polish

- Location within Turkey Location within Istanbul
- Coordinates: 41°06′36″N 29°12′43″E
- Country: Turkey
- Province: Istanbul
- District: Beykoz
- Population (2022): 346
- Time zone: UTC+3 (TRT)

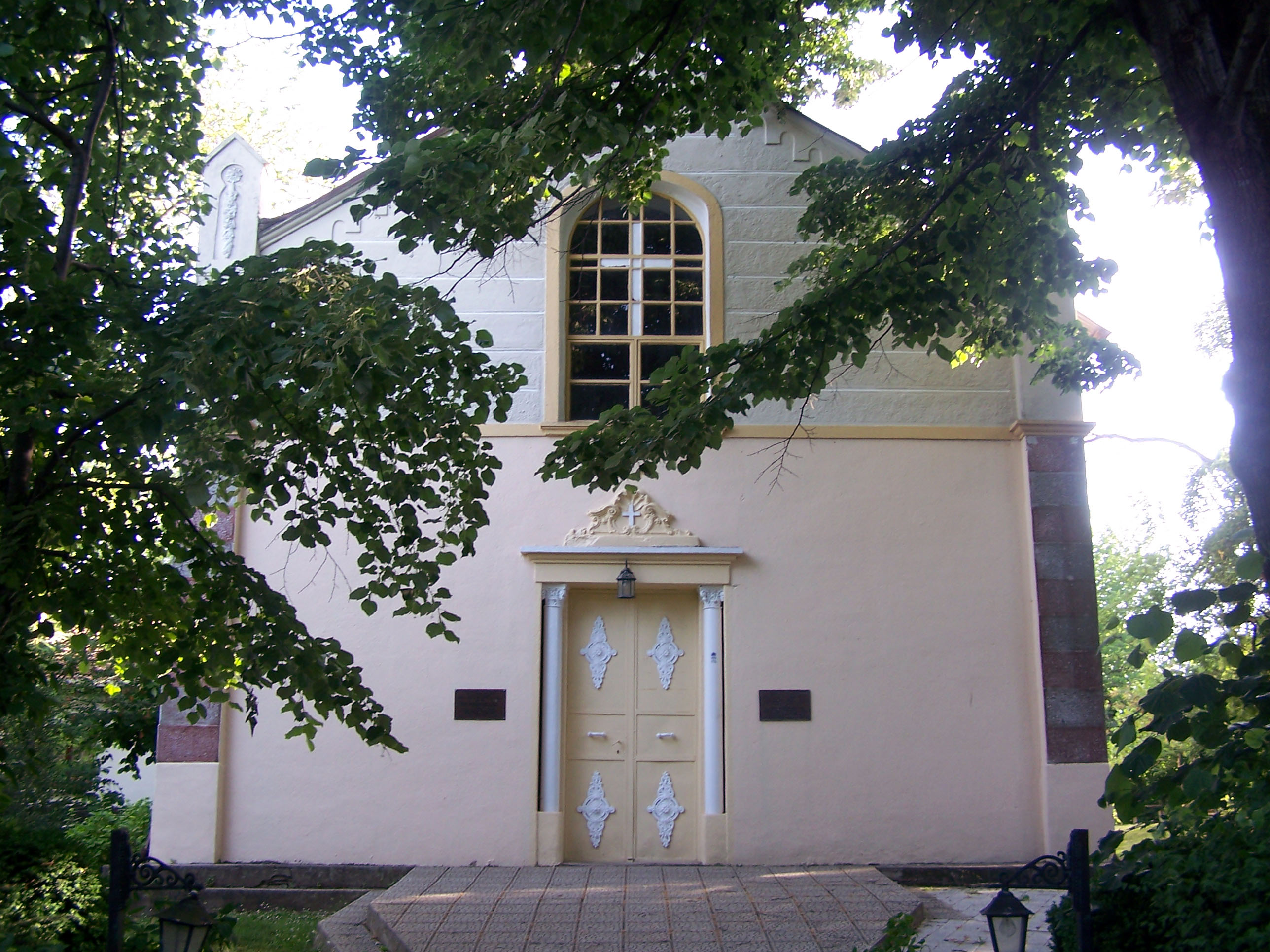
Our Lady of Częstochowa Church

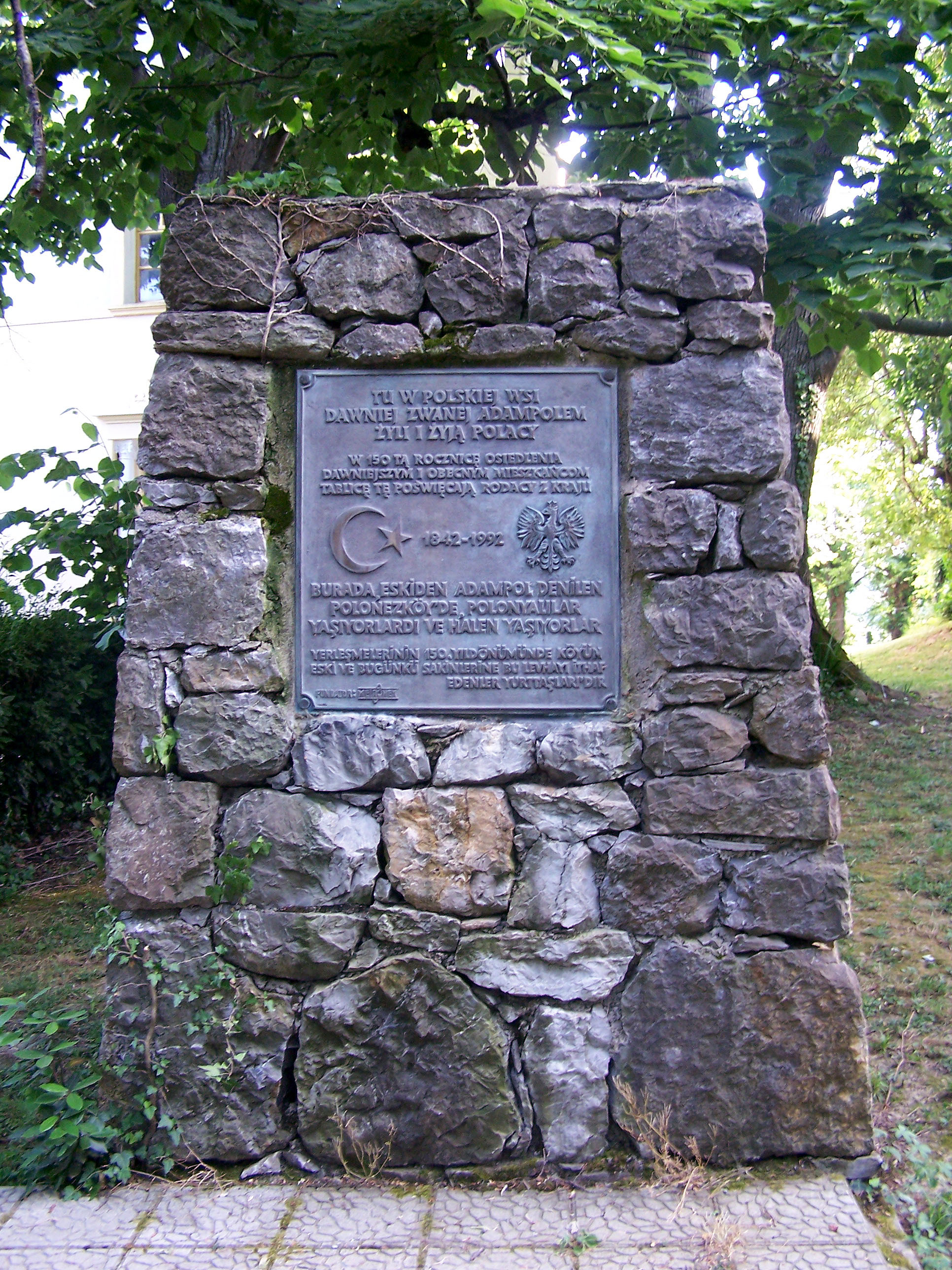
Memorial plaque commemorating the 150th anniversary of the settlement

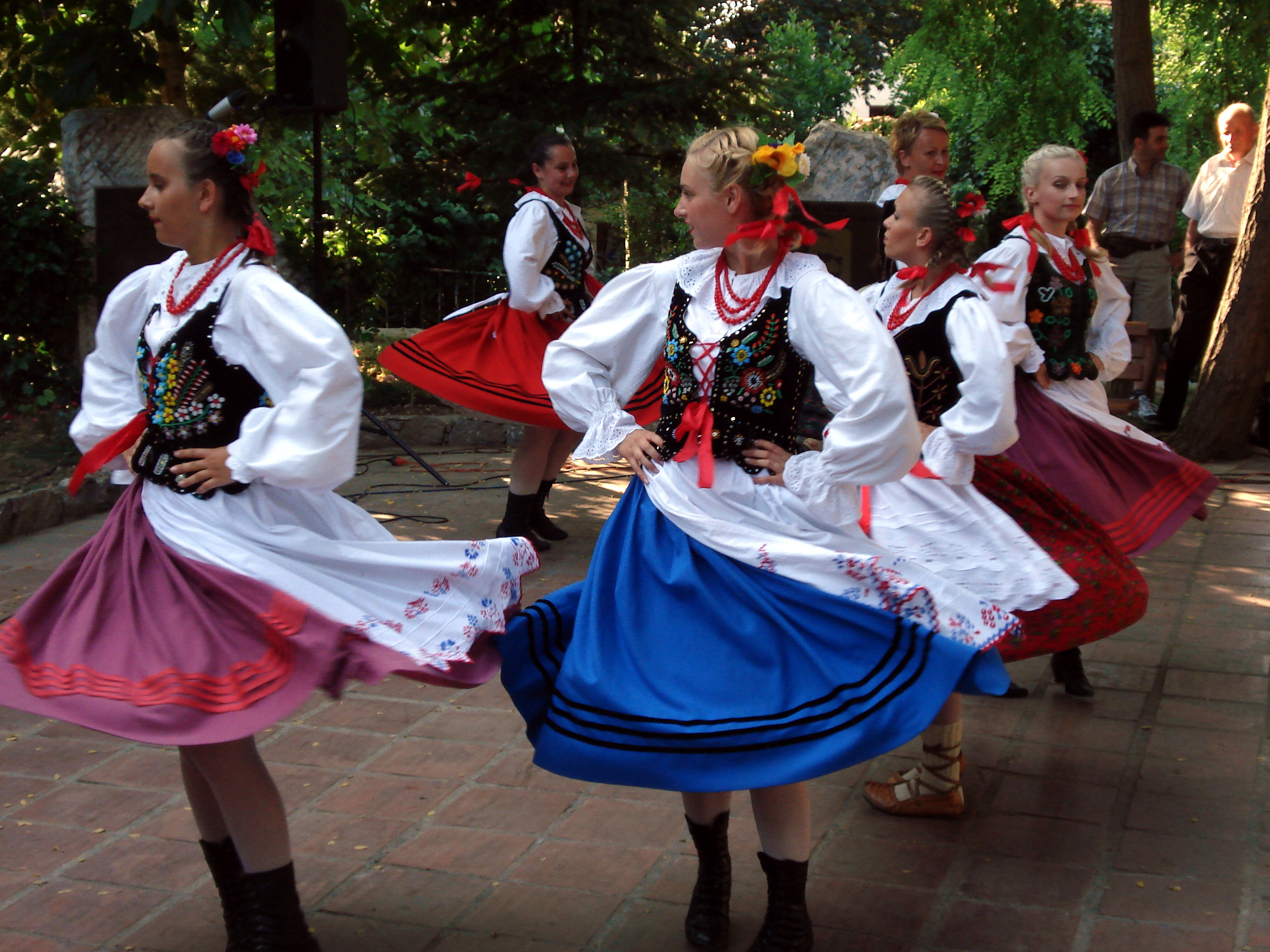
Polish festival in Polonezköy

Polonezköy or Adampol is a neighbourhood in the municipality and district of Beykoz, Istanbul Province, Turkey. Its population is 346 (2022). It is on the Asian side of Istanbul, about 30 km (19 mi) from the historic city centre. It was inspired and funded by Prince Adam Jerzy Czartoryski and settled in 1842 by a small group of Polish emigrės, after the failed November Uprising. There is still a Polish community there with its own church and cemetery.

== History of Polonezköy ==
Polonezköy (from French polonaise "Polish" and Turkish köy "village"), known in Polish as 'Adampol', was founded in 1842, from an idea of Adam Czartoryski. At the time he was Chairman of the Polish National Uprising Government and the leader of a political émigré party. The settlement was first named Adampol (that is, a Polish transcription of the Turkish Adamköy) in his honour.

Prince Czartoryski wanted to create a second emigration centre in Turkey after the first in Paris. He sent his representative, Michał Czajkowski, there and purchased the forest area which encompasses present-day Adampol from the missionary order of Lazarists. Plans were made to establish a future settlement on this spot. At the beginning, the village was inhabited by just 12 people; there were never more than 220 Poles even at the peak of its population. Over time, Adampol developed and was expanded by emigrants from the 1848 revolutions, the Crimean War in 1853, and by runaways from Siberia and from captivity in Circassia. The first inhabitants busied themselves with agriculture, cattle raising and forestry.

After Polish independence in 1918, many returned to Poland and the remaining inhabitants took Turkish citizenship in 1938. Already before World War II, the first tourists started arriving in the village. Adampol's village chronicles record the visits of famous people such as Franz Liszt (1847), French writer, Gustave Flaubert (1850), Czech writer, Karel Droz (1904), the first President of the Turkish Republic Mustafa Kemal Atatürk (1937), Pope Nuncio Angelo Roncalli - the future Pope John XXIII. During his visit in 1941 he gave religious confirmation to local children. The first Polish politician to visit after the Second World War was Adam Rapacki, then the Minister of Foreign Affairs of the Polish Republic, accompanied by Turkish dignitaries (1961).

In 1985 the village was visited by Kenan Evren, the head of the temporary military dictatorship during that period in Turkey, and in 1994 by Lech Wałęsa. The next President of Poland, Aleksander Kwaśniewski, came twice to Adampol in 1996 and 2000, when he visited the Memorial House of Zofia Ryży. In 2002 Adampol celebrated the 160th anniversary of its founding.

Polish descendants of the founders of Adampol often visit the settlement of their forebears. There is an annual summer festival in Adampol/Polonezköy which invites folk bands from Poland to play and help maintain the cultural ties between it and Poland. Famous Turks with Polish ancestry include the poet and playwright Nazım Hikmet and the soprano opera singer Leyla Gencer.

Over time, Muslim families started settling in the village. It is stated that currently there are around 700 people living here out of which 90 are Polish who speak Polish fluently. The community has been keeping their traditions and living peacefully without being assimilated. Their command of the Turkish language is stated to be excellent without any flaw in their pronunciation. Their origins are known by others only by their Polish names.

== Monuments and places of interest ==
- Memorial House of 'Zofia Rizi', housing souvenirs, photographs, books and documents, and historic interior decoration.
- Our Lady of Częstochowa Church.
- The Polish Cemetery, with graves of interest, especially that of Ludwika Śniadecka, a lover of the poet Juliusz Słowacki. There are 92 other graves, which have been renovated by the 'Fight and Martyrdom Memory Protection Council'.

== International relations ==
Polonezköy is twinned with:

- Tomaszów Mazowiecki, Poland
- Zakopane, Poland

== See also ==
- Turks in Poland
- Michał Czajkowski, a Polish-Ottoman official also known as Mehmed Sadyk Pasza (Mehmet Sadık Paşa)
