= Yalıköy, Beykoz =

Yalıköy
- Neighbourhood
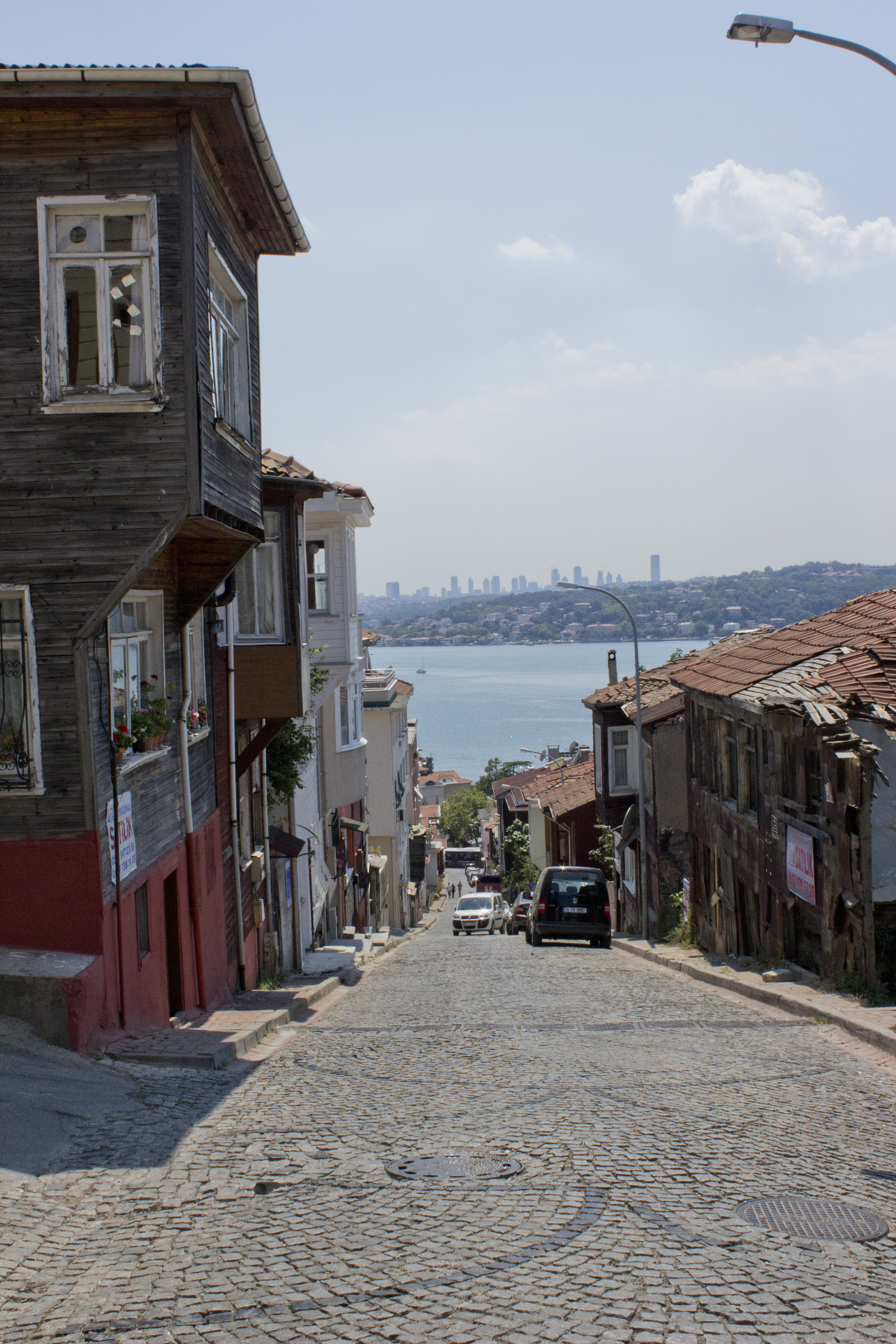
- A street view of Yalıköy, Beykoz with houses overlooking the waters of the Bosphorus

- Location within Turkey Location within Istanbul
- Coordinates: 41°8′29″N 29°05′00″E
- Country: Turkey
- Province: Istanbul
- District: Beykoz
- Population (2022): 5,107
- Time zone: UTC+3 (TRT)

Yalıköy is a neighbourhood in the municipality and district of Beykoz, Istanbul Province, Turkey. Its population is 5,107 (2022). It lies by the Anatolian/Asian side of the Bosphorus Strait. The name is a combination of two words: yalı ("waterside house" in Greek) and köy ("village" in Turkish). Yalıköy is known for its historic wooden Ottoman style houses overlooking the waters of the Bosphorus. A skyscraper skyline can be seen across on the other side of the Bosphorus, the business district of Maslak. People of Greek, Turkish, Albanian, and Armenian origin used to live in the area. A fishing community thrives on the coast of Yalıköy.

== People from Yalıköy, Beykoz ==
Some notable people from the neighborhood are:

- Hacı Osman Efendi
- Olcayto Kardeşler
- Orhan Veli Kanık
- Ahmet Mithat Efendi
- İlhan Yavrucuoğlu
- Burhan Önal
