= Akbaba, Istanbul =

Akbaba
- Neighbourhood
- Location in Turkey Akbaba (Istanbul)
- Coordinates: 41.1513°N 29.1150°E
- Country: Turkey
- Province: Istanbul
- District: Beykoz
- Population (2022): 2,771
- Time zone: UTC+3 (TRT)

Akbaba is a neighbourhood in the municipality and district of Beykoz, Istanbul Province, Turkey. Its population is 2,771 (2022). It is home to the türbe of Akbaba Sultan (Akbaba Mehmed Efendi or Akmehmet Efendi in short), a Bektashi Sufi baba who participated in the Conquest of Constantinople and was a mentor of Ottoman Sultan Mehmet the Conqueror (reigned 1444–1446, 1451–1481). Following the Conquest, he moved to this valley rich with spring waters and established a tekke with his dervish murids. The tekke was last revived by the Naqshbandi Shaykh Abdulhakim Efendi of Bukhara between 1876 and 1889.

Canfeda Hatun, a noblewoman attendant of Sultan Murad III’s mother, completed building a mosque in 1588 which bears her name.

It is thought that the Sufi complex first fell into disuse, along with all other Bektashi lodges in and around Istanbul, with its closure following the Auspicious Incident of 1826. Its followers were exiled from the area. Following an inactive period of half a century, during the reign of Sultan Abdulhamid II, it was turned over to Shaykh Abdulhakim by Abdulkadir Pasha, the commander of Istanbul central command. The pasha helped rebuild the center. Upon Shaykh Abdulhakim's passing in 1889, he was buried near Akbaba Sultan behind the tekke, which came to be Akbaba Cemetery extending up the hillside. His son Ahmed Mansur Mukerrem Efendi took his place and was active until the declaration of all tekkes and zawiyas to be illegal in 1925. The law for the closure of traditional institutions was passed on 30 November 1925 as part of Mustafa Kemal's reforms and revolutions.

Religious institutions started to appear in public life along with the multi-party system following the 1950 Turkish general election. By this time, most of the tekke buildings were destroyed and only the mosque and attached harem section remained. The harem section was turned into an imam's office. The government of President Erdogan and his AK Party supported religious institutions and restored the mosque in the 2000s. The mosque was rebuilt again in the 2010s, keeping true to its original wooden form on a stone foundation, and reclaiming the entire borders of the complex with landscaping and a stone border wall.

A Rifai tekke also existed in the village but its one known building fell into disuse, rotted away and was demolished for safety reasons. The graveyard of the tekke is preserved and lies next to the property of Akbaba Dergah.

The area is famous for its greenery which attracts the filming of Turkish TV series.
