= Hasan Bülent Kahraman =

Turkish academic

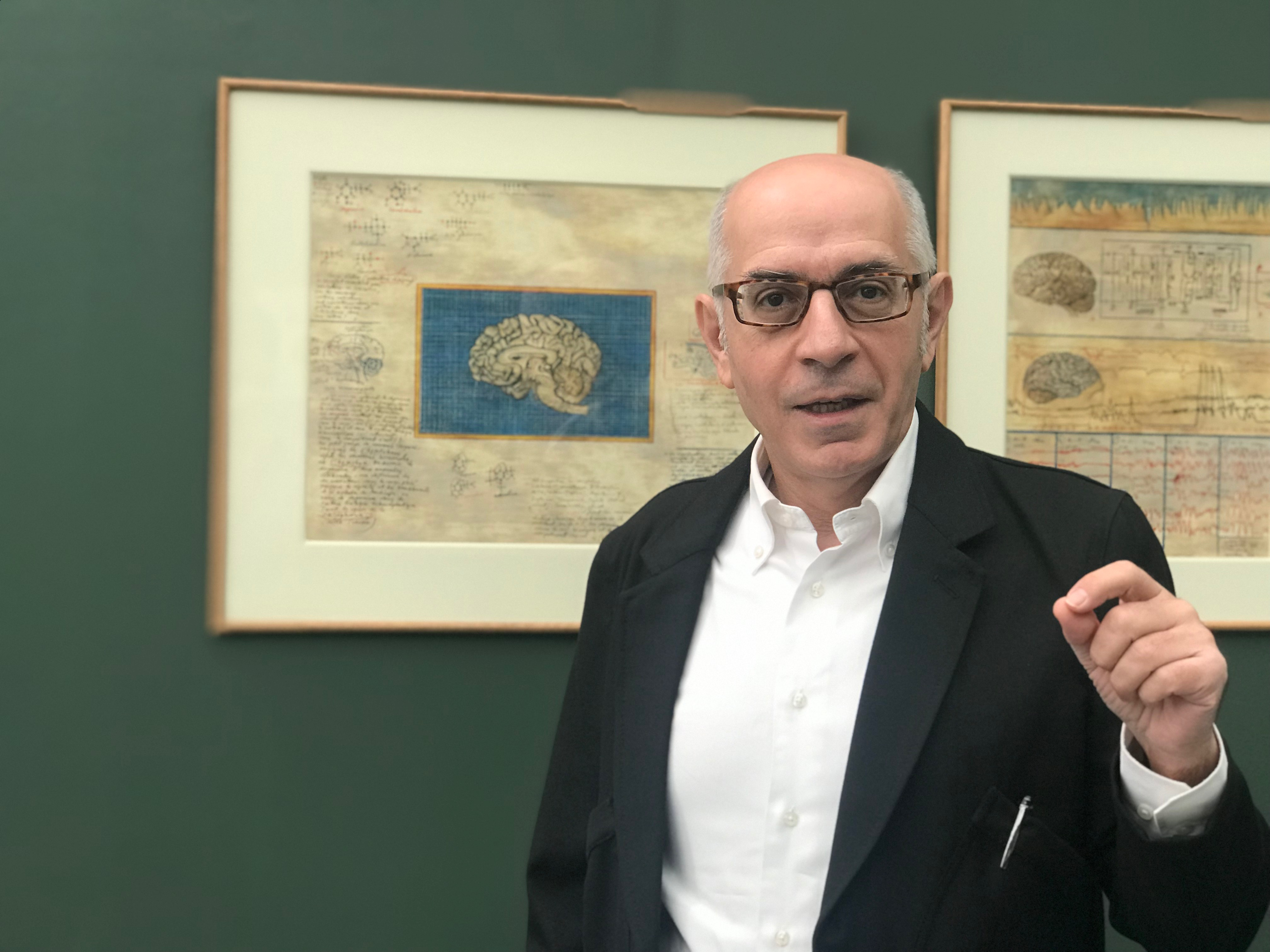
- Occupations: Author; art critic; curator
- Employer: Işık University
- Title: Rector

Academic background
- Education: TED Ankara College
- Alma mater: Gazi University (BS); Hacettepe University (MS); Bilkent University (PhD)

Hasan Bülent Kahraman (born September 1, 1957, Kars), is a Turkish academic, author, art critic, and curator. He worked as a lecturer, and had administrative duties at Hacettepe University, Middle East Technical University, Bilkent University, Sabancı University, Princeton University, Kadir Has University, and Netkent University as the Dean, Vice-Rector and Rector. He has been working as an independent writer, art critic, curator, and cultural critic since 1977. He currently serves as the rector of Işık University.

He was also a member of the Advisory Board of the Istanbul Foundation for Culture and Arts (IKSV) and served on the Advisory Board of the Istanbul Biennial (1992-2005). Since 2010, he has been the General Coordinator and a member of the Executive Committee of Contemporary Istanbul Art Fair. He is a member of the Advisory Board of Akbank Sanat, and the Board of Trustees of Sakıp Sabancı Museum. He was the founder, director, and curator of Gallery KHAS, the art gallery of Kadir Has University. He also served as the Artistic Director of the Working Committee in Turkey for the Europalia Arts Festival held in Brussels in 2015. His research interests include Turkish politics, political theories, social theory, post-structural philosophy, cultural studies, visual theory, modern Turkish literature, and Turkish popular culture.

== Early life and education ==
Hasan Bülent Kahraman started his primary education in Kars and completed it in Ankara. He completed his secondary education at TED Ankara College. He got his academic degrees from the Department of Civil Engineering at Gazi University (BS), Economics Department at Hacettepe University (MS), and Political Science Department at Bilkent University (PhD).

== Career ==
=== Early professional life ===
Kahraman started his professional life in May 1980 at the Department of Dams of the General Directorate of State Hydraulic Works. In 1981, he received an acceptance first from the Department of Economics at Middle East Technical University (METU) and then from the Department of Economics at Hacettepe University. He decided not to pursue the courses at METU because he would not be allowed to continue his job at the State Hydraulic Works (DSİ), so he chose to continue his studies at Hacettepe University. After receiving his Master of Science degree in 1984, he went to the United States. He pursued post-graduate studies in art theory at Columbia University, New York. On his return to Turkey, he decided to resign from his positions at academic and public offices primarily due to the new rules established in the higher education system by the military junta. Until 1991, Kahraman took up management positions in the private sector and worked as a freelance writer of literary and art reviews. Together with his friends, he published Kalın, a magazine of art criticism, which remained to this day as one of the most influential art magazines ever published in the field of contemporary art. He wrote most of the articles either in his own name or under different pen names (Hüseyin Yavuz and Ferit Doğrusöz).

=== Academic career ===
Kahraman suspended his academic career in 1985 to commit himself to the contemporary art world as a free-lance art and literary critic and publisher of a journal. In 1993, he received an invitation from Erdağ Aksel, the Department Head of Visual Arts and Visual Communication Design, Faculty of Fine Arts, Bilkent University, and he decided to resume his academic career on a part-time basis. He became a full-time lecturer at Bilkent University after leaving his post at the Ministry of Culture. At Bilkent University, Kahraman collaborated with various lecturers of Visual Arts and Visual Communication Design, including Hüseyin Bahri Alptekin, Michael Morris, Fulya Erdemci, Selim Birsel, and Erol Akyavaş. He delivered several lectures on art, which included ‘Art and Culture’, ‘Concepts and Issues in Contemporary Art’, and ‘What is Contemporary’. At Bilkent University, Department of Visual Arts and Visual Communication Design, Hasan Bülent Kahraman was also responsible for the coordination of the ‘Art and Culture’ course. The department became one of the first institutions that laid the cultural and theoretical foundations of visual design within the context of social and human sciences in Turkey.

In 1993, Kahraman was selected by USIS to join the Young Leaders Program. He went to the United States and participated in the “Pluralism and Multiculturalism in America” program.

==== Sabancı University ====
In 1995, Sabancı University was founded after a search conference and invited Hasan Bülent Kahraman to take active role in the design committee of the Faculty of Arts and Social Sciences program. The program design consisted of innovative principles such as a common core-curriculum in the initial three terms, a non-departmental interdisciplinary educational approach, opportunities for students to switch between departments and faculties, and student admission procedures directly into faculties rather than specific departments (programs). Once the program design was completed in 1998, Sabancı University was officially established, and this was when Hasan Bülent Kahraman was invited to be one of the founding members as part of the academic staff of Sabancı University. He accepted the invitation and moved to Istanbul.

Kahraman was appointed Coordinator of the Foundations Development Program (FDP) of Sabancı University. He set forth the fundamental principles of the program that would allow for a novel and more functional method of teaching the English language. He recruited the lecturers and worked in close collaboration with them to prepare the course contents and textbooks. At the same time, he also worked on the basic Social Sciences program. He created a new approach to teaching Turkish Language and Literature, and the History of Turkish Revolution courses as part of the Foundations Development Program. He continued teaching both of these courses during his time at Sabancı University.

Later on, he decided to withdraw from his post as the Coordinator of FDP to pursue his academic and intellectual studies and interests. However, he continued teaching as a member of the Faculty of Arts and Social Sciences, where he worked as the Coordinator of the Visual Arts and Communication Design Program. The program adopted an integrated educational method, in which applied art education was combined with theoretical foundational courses, an approach that was generated at Bilkent University. In accordance with the interdisciplinary structure of the Faculty of Arts and Social Sciences at Sabancı University, Kahraman taught the courses of Political Science and Art Theory simultaneously.

At Sabancı University, Kahraman designed and taught a series of courses that focused on the modernisation of Turkish art since the early 20th century. ‘The Making of Modern Turkey’ was a modular course that was designed for two semesters. While the first semester focused on the period between 1908 and 1923, the second semester explored the period between 1950 and 2010. His other courses included ‘Turkish Social Thought’, ‘Post-1960 Turkish Politics’, ‘From Modern to Contemporary: Art of the 20th century’, ‘Post-1960 Turkish Art’, ‘Vision, Representation, Cinema’, and ‘Visual Ideology and Culture’. These courses were followed by ‘Major Works of Cinema’, which consisted of lectures delivered to over 200 students. Before leaving Sabancı University in 2010, Hasan Bülent Kahraman established the program of Art, Theory and Criticism and taught its first semester courses.

Over these years, he visited the Columbia University and Michigan State University as a lecturer and research fellow, and in 2005, he was selected to receive a fellowship as Ahmet Ertegün Professor at Princeton University. He gave graduate and post-graduate lectures on Turkish modernization and Turkish social thought at the Department of Near Eastern Studies. During this time, he also gave lectures at the Universities of Michigan, Columbia and at UCLA. He became an Associate Professor of Political Thought, and on various occasions, he organised workshops at Princeton University.

==== After Sabancı University ====
In 2010, Kahraman left Sabancı University to be able to spend more time in the city and concentrating more on the practical side of the contemporary art. Having accepted an offer from Kadir Has University, he was appointed Vice Rector & Provost in charge of Academic Affairs. Here, he was instrumental in revising the educational program of the university. He remained in charge of Academic Affairs and served as Vice Rector at Kadir Has University until 2018. He left this office to embark on a new academic project in July 2018 as the Rector of Netkent University, an institution established solely to offer distance learning and evening education programs. As the program was not recognized by the Council of Higher Education (CoHE) in Turkey, and because of the disagreements the Council had with the founders of the institution, he resigned from this position in December 2018. In July 2019, Kahraman was appointed Vice Rector in Charge of Academic Affairs and the Dean of the Faculty of Architecture and Design at Işık University. Here, he undertook the preparation of the Strategic Plan. He also delivered various lectures in the Science of Art Doctorate Program offered by the Faculty of Fine Arts. In December 2021, he was appointed the Rector of Işık University.

He is a member of the Turkish Social, Economic, Political Research Foundation (TÜSES), SODEV, History Foundation (Turkish: Tarih Vakfı), Middle East Studies Association of North America, American Political Science Association, and College Art Association.

=== Public service career ===
In 1991, he started working as an Advisor to the General Secretary of the Social Democratic Populist Party (SHP). He was appointed Consultant to the Ministry of Culture by the DYP-SHP coalition government, which was formed after the elections held the same year. Working together with different Ministers of Culture, he spent a highly active period at this institution until 1996. When Agah Oktay Güner became the Minister of Culture in the same year, Kahraman was the first person to be relieved of his duties, so he tendered his resignation. The last time he held a public office was in May 2014 when he became the Chief Advisor to the 11th President of the Republic of Turkey, Abdullah Gül. He left this office in August 2014.

=== Career as a columnist ===
Kahraman started publishing his articles in 1985 on the arts and culture pages of Cumhuriyet newspaper although he was not a regular contributor at first. By that time, he had already published articles in various culture and art magazines. In 1991, he started working as a columnist in Güneş newspaper. In addition to his columns, he contributed several article series during the time he worked for this newspaper. He wrote political articles in Yeni Yüzyıl newspaper, which was established in 1995.

He was invited to write for Radikal newspaper, which published its first issue in 1996. He contributed articles to this newspaper until 2005 when he set out to the United States, where he was going for a long-term stay to give lectures at Princeton University. While he was writing for Radikal, he contributed two articles a week at first, which later became three. After a while, he started writing once a week for the Culture & Art page of the same newspaper. He also published his articles in the newspaper’s supplement, Radikal 2. After leaving his job as a columnist at the newspaper, he continued contributing articles regularly to this supplement during his stay in the USA.

In 2007, he started working for Sabah newspaper. At first, he wrote only in his column, but afterwards, he started contributing his articles to the weekend supplement of the newspaper. Similar to his contributions to Radikal newspaper as a cultural critic, his articles for the weekend supplement of Sabah were mostly about arts and culture. He left Sabah on September 1, 2017.

=== Curatorial work ===
In 1993, Kahraman was appointed a member of the Advisory Board of Istanbul Biennial, organized by the Istanbul Foundation for Culture and Arts. He contributed to this institution until 2005. During this time, he was a member of the committee that recruited the curators of the biennials. He maintained a close work relationship with Şakir Eczacıbaşı.

In 2000, he collaborated with Erdağ Aksel and Selim Birsel at Sabancı University during the foundation of the Kasa Gallery.

In 2003, Hasan Bülent Kahraman was appointed a member of the Advisory Board of Akbank Sanat by Hamit Belli, the founder of the institution. At a time when the field of contemporary art was newly emerging, the Board managed to organize art exhibitions and events that enabled this field to flourish in Turkey. At Akbank Sanat, Kahraman curated various exhibitions, initially with local and emerging artists, and later with internationally renowned figures. Today, he still contributes to this institution. On several occasions, he has been a member of the selection committee of the Contemporary Artists Prize Exhibitions, an annual event that is sponsored and organized by Akbank Sanat. He has been the editor (and after a while, the translator) of the major books that Akbank Sanat has traditionally published every year. He still continues to contribute to these publications.

In 2003, when Sakıp Sabancı decided to turn his family home Atlı Köşk into a museum, Kahraman took an active role in the foundation process of the Sakıp Sabancı Museum. The museum opened in 2005. In 2008, he became a member of the museum’s Board of Trustees. He joined the International Advisory Board. He continues to serve for this museum as a member of the Board of Trustees.

In 2012, he became the General Coordinator of the Contemporary Istanbul (CI) Art Fair. At the time, he had already been on the Advisory Board of the institution since 2007. After becoming the General Coordinator, he made contributions towards the internationalization of the fair, introducing new galleries into the event, and the adoption of a new management approach. He also served as the coordinator of the CI Magazine published by the Contemporary Istanbul Art Fair. In 2014, he left the position of General Coordinator and became a Member of the Executive Committee. He is still working in this position.

In 2015, he used an empty venue within Kadir Has University premises to transform it into Gallery KHAS. Here, he started organizing exhibitions and various cultural events with young and emerging artists one after another. Soon, the gallery was recognized as a place that fosters the works of such artists and began to attract attention in the art scene. Particularly young artists sought opportunities to organize exhibitions at Gallery KHAS to benefit from the concept of ‘democratic curation’, a curation approach coined by Kahraman himself, which is based on mutual interaction enriched with his comprehensive interpretations and guidance on art. The gallery gained momentum and effectiveness to be able to generate new art trends. When Kahraman left the university in 2018, his engagement with the gallery also came to an end. Following his departure, the gallery was closed by the university administration.

When Turkey was chosen to be the guest country in the Europalia Festival held in Brussels in 2015. Kahraman became the Artistic Director of the Working Committee of Turkey. He showcased the contemporary and traditional pieces of Turkish art and literature in far-reaching exhibitions and events.

=== Television work ===
Kahraman’s first television program was Fildişi Kule (Ivory Tower) on TV8 in 2003. The program, which attracted great interest, was aired once a week on Sundays and broadcast interviews with leading figures in the fields of culture, art, and thought. The program ended in 2005.

In 2007, he worked on another widely acclaimed program called Beyin Fırtınası (Brainstorming) on ATV, together with journalist Fehmi Koru. After Koru left, Kahraman continued producing the program for a short time with Cengiz Çandar.

In 2016, Kahraman appeared in a program called Son Baskı (The Final Edition) on NTV with Bekir Ağırdır and Ali Bayramoğlu.

The same year, he produced and directed a program with a striking visual background, Bildiğiniz Gibi Değil (Nothing Like You Know) on NTV, focusing on leading figures and their projects and endeavours in the field of culture and arts. Kahraman also edited the program himself. Although the program received positive reactions, it was cancelled by the institution during its process of reorganization.

== Intellectual life ==
Literature and Fine Arts (1980s)

Hasan Bülent Kahraman’s first article ‘Ah Bayım Ah’, a critique of a short story book by Nazlı Eray, was published in the July 1976 issue of Varlık magazine. Prior to this article, his translations of poems by various American poets had been published in the same literary magazine. Following his first literary criticism, he continued contributing similar articles to the magazine. In 1977, he was appointed editor of the art & culture section of Özgür İnsan magazine, which was published by Bülent Ecevit as CHP’s media outlet. In this magazine, he edited thought-provoking literary inquiries and published book reviews. He began writing for Gösteri magazine when it was first published in the 1980s. His contributions were mainly theoretical literary criticisms. After Attilâ İlhan was appointed editor of Sanat Olayı, he became one of the regular contributors to this magazine. He also contributed to other magazines published under İlhan’s editorship. These works had a clear polemical tone, exploring the libertarian and innovative foundations of a social realistic understanding of literature. He expanded some of these articles and included them in his books, Beyazlar Kirli (Whites are Dirty) and Bir Sürekli Cehennem (A Perpetual Hell).

From 1985 onwards, Kahraman began writing articles on art theory and analysis. In April 1986, he published Kalın Sanat Seçkisi (Bold: A Selection of Art) together with artists Mehmet Güleryüz, Nihal Ataman and Ülker Ün. His articles on contemporary Turkish visual art published in this magazine attracted great interest and were the earliest examples of objective contemporary art criticism in Turkey. During this time, he also continued to write on literature.

Literature and Postmodern Theory (1990s)

In the 1990s, Hasan Bülent Kahraman started working for Varlık once again when Enver Ercan became the chief editor of the magazine. Here, he published articles that combined postmodern theory with social, critical, and cultural theory. He adopted an approach that contextualized literary criticism in a solid background of social and cultural theory, and he developed a unique outlook on literature. He compiled these views comprehensively in his books, Yahya Kemal Rimbaud’yu Okudu mu? (Did Yahya Kemal Read Rimbaud?), Türk Şiiri, Modernizm, Şiir (Turkish Poetry, Modernism, Poetry), Post-modernite ile Modernite Arasında Türkiye (Turkey, Between Post-modernity and Modernity), Post Entelektüel Dönem ve Edebiyat (Post-Intellectual Period and Literature), Türkiye’de Yazınsal Bilincin Oluşumu (Türkiye’de Modern Kültürün Temelleri-1) (The Formation of Literary Consciousness in Turkey (Foundations of Modern Culture in Turkey-1)), and Türkiye’de Görsel Bilincin Oluşumu (Türkiye’de Modern Kültürün Temelleri-2) (The Formation of Visual Consciousness in Turkey (Foundations of Modern Culture in Turkey-2)). In all these books, he examined his subject matters with a broad historical perspective.

Political and Social Theory (2000s)

In the 2000s, he mostly appeared in the intellectual scene with his academic articles. Especially his articles on political theory published in Doğu Batı magazine were academic studies offering a deep examination of the social and political structure of Turkey and an analysis of that structure by means of political philosophy. He included his innovative views on Turkish politics in a later book that was published in two volumes, Türk Siyasetinin Yapısal Analizi (The Structural Analysis of Turkish Politics). He also compiled his thoughts on left-wing politics in the books, Yeni Bir Sosyal Demokrasi İçin (For a New Social Democracy), Sosyal Demokrasi, Türkiye ve Partileri (Social Democracy: Turkey and Its Parties), Sağ, Türkiye ve Partileri (The Right: Turkey and Its Parties), Sosyal Demokrasi Düşüncesi ve Türkiye Pratiği (The Thought of Social Democracy and Practice in Turkey). In 2006, he published AKP ve Türk Sağı (AKP and the Turkish Right), one of the first books on AKP (Justice and Development Party). In another book, Post-modernite ile Modernite Arasında Türkiye (Turkey, Between Post-modernity and Modernity), Kahraman reflected his views in search of combining social and political theories within the context of cultural theory.

Popular Culture

After the year 2000, his articles were published once a week on the Culture & Art page of Radikal newspaper. In these articles, Kahraman discussed topics on popular culture, contemporary art, and cultural life within the context of social theory with a more populist tone. He looked at the theory of popular culture from a critical stance, with an attempt at analysing the sources of popular culture in Turkey and in the world, and the social reactions of a mentality that had become integrated with everyday culture. His endeavour to demonstrate how the behaviours of social subjects were determined by the elements of popular culture, to which those same subjects were unwittingly exposed, formed the backbone of his articles. He discussed these views at length in his books, Kültür Tarihi Affetmez (Culture Does Not Forgive History) and Kitle Kültürü Kitlelerin Afyonu (Mass Culture, the Opium of the Masses).

Visual Theory

He expressed his views on visual theory on both theoretical and popular levels. While conveying his theoretical work in his book Sanatsal Gerçeklikler, Olgular ve Öteleri (Artistic Realities, Phenomena and Beyond) and in the texts he wrote for the catalogues of the exhibitions he organized, which at times ended up reaching the scale of a book, he discussed the reflections of visual theory immanent in popular culture and everyday life in his book Cinsellik, Görsellik, Pornografi (Sexuality, Visuality, Pornography). With this perspective, he focused on the relationships between visual consciousness, modernization, and identity in Turkey from the 19th century onwards, in his book Türkiye’de Görsel Bilincin Oluşumu (Türkiye’de Modern Kültürün Temelleri-2) (The Formation of Visual Consciousness in Turkey (Foundations of Modern Culture in Turkey-2)).

Kahraman has expressed his views on these subjects in numerous essays and articles he has written for exhibition catalogues; these written works have not been compiled in a book yet. However, all of them include long and extensive theoretical analyses, which examine the fundamental notions of art theory from the perspective of the artist and their work. At the same time, he is occupied with the major issues of classical art such as the human tragedy, and the relationship between art and the universal tragedy of existence. On the other hand, he has articulated his views on the popular problematics of the contemporary art world in his book Bakmak, Görmek Bir de Bilmek (Looking, Seeing and Also Knowing).

He published his book Türkiye’de Çağdaş Sanat 1980-2000 (Contemporary Art in Turkey, 1980-2000), which examined the development of contemporary art in Turkey after 1980 within the context of the political, social, and cultural formations that took place in Turkey and around the world. The book was the first of its kind in this field.

Journals and Essays (2010s)

In the 2010s, Hasan Bülent Kahraman published his journals for the first time in Varlık magazine under the title Anlar/Zamanlar (Moments/Times). These previously unpublished journals received great attention as he had numerous notebooks /diaries, which were full of his reflections on everyday life, accounts of his own personal life, the books and theoretical matters that occupied him, his frequent travels, observations and thoughts, as well as his memories. He stopped publishing his journals in early 2014. In 2016, he suspended the publication of his articles in the Sunday Supplement of Sabah newspaper and started publishing passages from his journals here. In these passages, he focused on cultural issues and travel observations. The journals that appeared in the newspaper were short excerpts from the longer and more extensive pieces he wrote in his notebooks. After a while, he started publishing his reading diaries, a kind of book criticism, in the Sabah Literary Supplement.

His essays that delved into the subjects of the human being, life, everyday living, trivial observations, and formulations mostly appeared in his newspaper columns. He compiled selections from these essays and published them in his book Cam Odada Oturmak (Living in a Glass Room).

== Bibliography ==
- 2010 - Türk Siyasetinin Yapısal Analizi-2: 1920-1960 - Istanbul, Agora Books.
- 2009 - Post Entelektüel Dönem ve Edebiyat - Istanbul, Agora Books.
- 2008 - Türk Siyasetinin Yapısal Analizi-1: Kavramlar, Kuramlar, Kurumlar - Istanbul, Agora Books.
- 2008 - Beyazlar Kirli - Istanbul, Agora Books.
- 2007 - Türk Sağı ve AKP - Istanbul, Agora Books.
- 2006 - ABD Bu 11 Eylül’ü Çok Sevdi: 11 Eylül Sonrası ABD, Türkiye ve Ortadoğu - Istanbul, Agora Books.
- 2005 - Cinsellik, Görsellik, Pornografi - Istanbul, Agora Books.
- 2004 – Kültür Tarihi Affetmez: Türkiye’de 1990’lar ve Kültürel Dönüşüm Sorunsalı - Istanbul, Agora Books.
- 2003 - Kitle Kültürü Kitlelerin Afyonu - Istanbul, Agora Books.
- 2003 - Sosyal Demokrasi Düşüncesi ve Türkiye Pratiği - Istanbul, Sodev Publications.
- 2002 - Sanatsal Gerçeklikler, Olgular ve Öteleri - Istanbul, Agora Books.
- 2002 - Post-modernite ile Modernite Arasında Türkiye: 1980 Sonrası Zihinsel, Toplumsal, Siyasal Dönüşüm - Istanbul, Everest Publishing House.
- 2002 - Post-modernite Kuramları ve Geç Modernite Süreçleri - Istanbul, Everest Publishing House.
- 2002 - Türk Şiiri, Modernizm, Şiir - Istanbul, Büke Publishing House.
- 2002 - Cam Odada Oturmak - Istanbul, İnkılap Publishing House.
- 2002 - Post-modernite Kuramları ve Türkiye Pratiği - Istanbul, Sodev Publications.
- 1999 - Sağ, Türkiye ve Partileri - Ankara, İmge Publishing House.
- 1999 - Sosyal Demokrasi, Türkiye ve Partileri - Ankara, İmge Publishing House.
- 1999 - Yeni Bir Sosyal Demokrasi İçin - Ankara, İmge Publishing House.
- 1998 - Yahya Kemal Rimbaud’yu Okudu mu? Erken Türk Modernizması Üstüne Bir Deneme - Istanbul, Yapı Kredi Publications.
- 1990 - Bir Sürekli Cehennem - Istanbul, Kavram.

== Exhibitions ==
Kasa Gallery Exhibitions

- 2008 - İşin Başı - Çizime Farklı Yaklaşımlar (The Beginnings: Different Approaches to Drawing)

Akbank Exhibitions

- 2005 - “İşleiş” (WorkbyWork) - Eser Selen
- 2006 - 25. Günümüz Sanatçıları Sergisi (25th Contemporary Artists Exhibition)
- 2007 - “KİTÂBESİ dot” (INSCRIPTION dot) - Canan Dağdalen
- 2008 - “İç-sel” (In-flux) - Zeren Göktan
- 2011 - “Beyaz Tohumlayıcılar” (White Seeders) - Johan Tahon
- 2012 - “İnsanlık Serüveni” (The Human Adventure) - Magdalena Abakanowicz
- 2012 - “Çelişkiler” (Contradictions) - Maureen Connor
- 2014 - “Özerk ve Çok Güzel” (Autonomous and Beautiful)
- 2014 - “Sözcükler, Nesneler, Kavramlar” (Words, Things, Concepts) - Marcel Broodthaers
- 2015 - “Dünyadan Büyük” (Larger Than Life) - Louis Bourgeoise
- 2016 - “Sanat Rastlantısı/Rastlantının Sanatı” (The Incident of Art/The Art of Incident) – Group Exhibition
- 2018 - “Öte/de/ki Mimarlık” (The Far/o/ther Architecture) - Murat Tabanlıoğlu-HanTümertekin
- 2018 - “Garip Meyve” (Strange Fruit) - Susie MacMurray
- 2019 - “Öz/Çeviri-m” (Self/Trans-lation) - Sudarshan Shetty
- 2020 - “6 Sanatçı Öncülünü Arıyor” (6 Artists in Search of a Precedent)
