= Yeşilçay Drinking Water Plant =

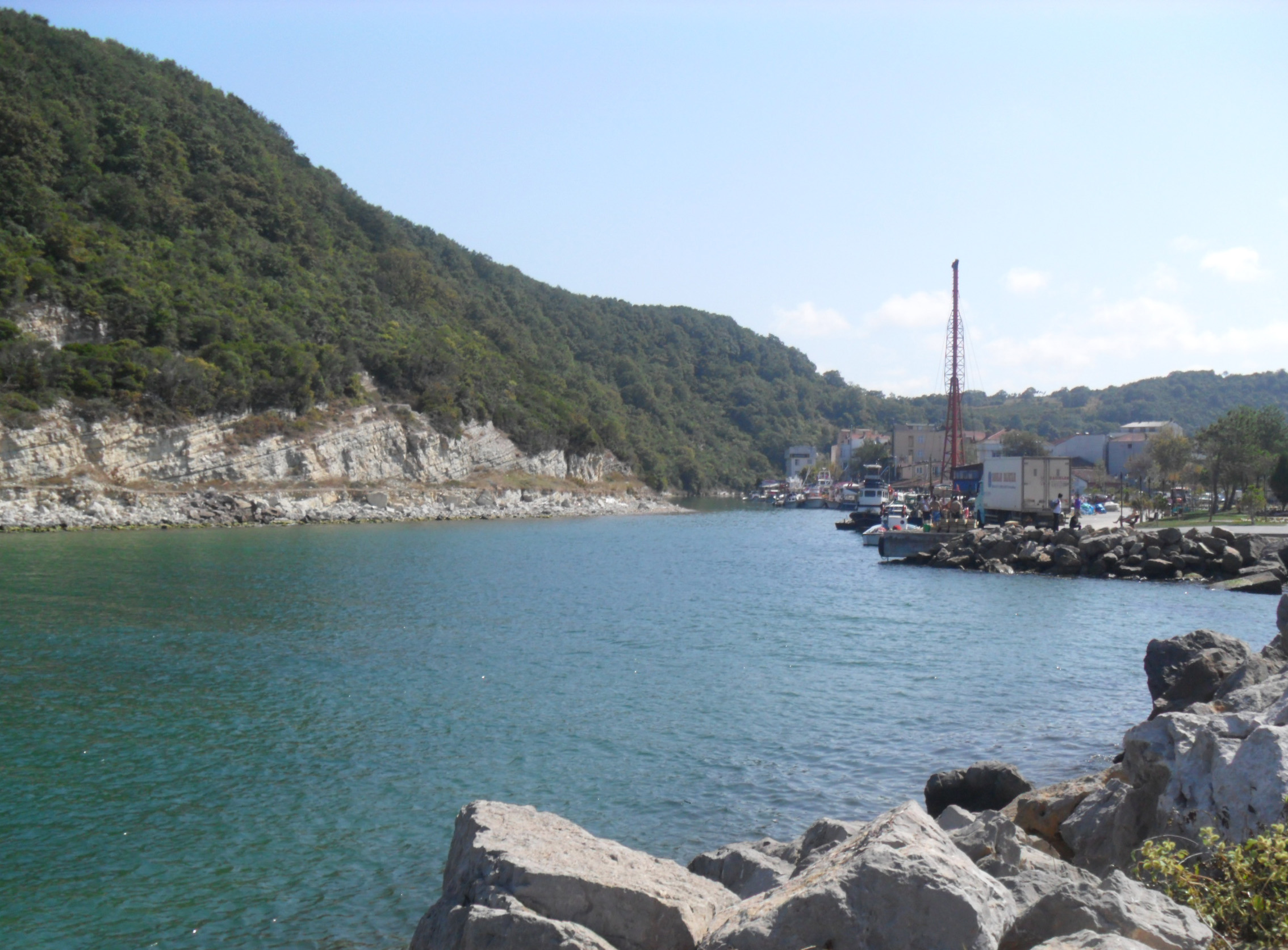
Mouth of Yeşilçay in Ağva

Yeşilçay Drinking Water Plant is a plant used to supply drinking water to Istanbul, Turkey.

== Istanbul ==
The total population of Istanbul is nearly 16 million (as of 2022), which makes Istanbul one of the most populous cities of the world. The rate of annual increase is about 3.5% and the water demand is increasing asymptotically. So one of the most important problems of the municipality is to meet the demand.

== Yeşilçay ==
Yeşilçay is a river about 60 kilometres (37 mi) east of Anatolian quarters of Istanbul. The headwaters are on the mountainous area of the Kocaeli Peninsula and the river flows to the Black Sea in Ağva.

== The plant ==
There are two water regulators (Sungurlu and İsabey ) on the rivulet and the water is pumped to the purification plant at Emirli via 2,650 metres (8,690 ft) mains pipe. The diameter of the prestressed steel mains pipe is 3,000 millimetres (120 in). In the first stage of the project 145 000 000 m^{3} water has been given to service annually. In the second stage the annual water intake is increased to a total of 335 000 000 m^{3}.

== List of 50 projects ==
Turkish Chamber of Civil Engineers lists Yeşilçay Drinking Water Plant as one of the fifty civil engineering feats in Turkey, a list of remarkable engineering projects realized in the first 50 years of the chamber.
