= Işık University =

Private university in Şile, İstanbul, Turkey

Coordinates: 41.1689°N 29.5636°E

- Işık Üniversitesi
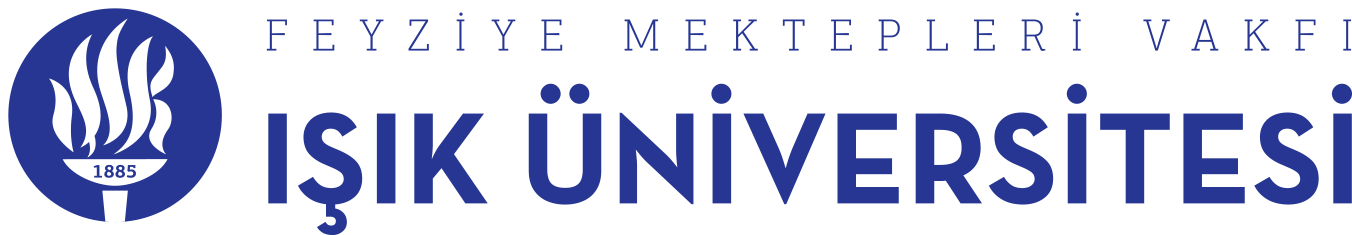
- Type: Private
- Established: 14 December 1885; 140 years ago as Feyz-i Sıbyan Mektebi 1995; 31 years ago as FMV Işık Üniversitesi
- Affiliations: EUA; Bologna Process; Erasmus Programme
- President: Hasan Bülent Kahraman
- Administrative staff: 650
- Undergraduates: 6610
- Postgraduates: 850
- Location: Şile, Istanbul
- Campus: Rural
- Athletics: Işık Sports Club
- Website: isikun.edu.tr

University rankings

Regional – Overall
- QS Emerging Europe and Central Asia: 351-400 (2022)

Işık University (Turkish: Işık Üniversitesi) is a private university located in Istanbul, Turkey. The university operates under the Feyziye Schools Foundation's Işık Schools, which originated with the establishment of the Feyz-i Sıbyan School in the city of Salonica, modern Thessaloniki, on 14 December 1885.

== History ==
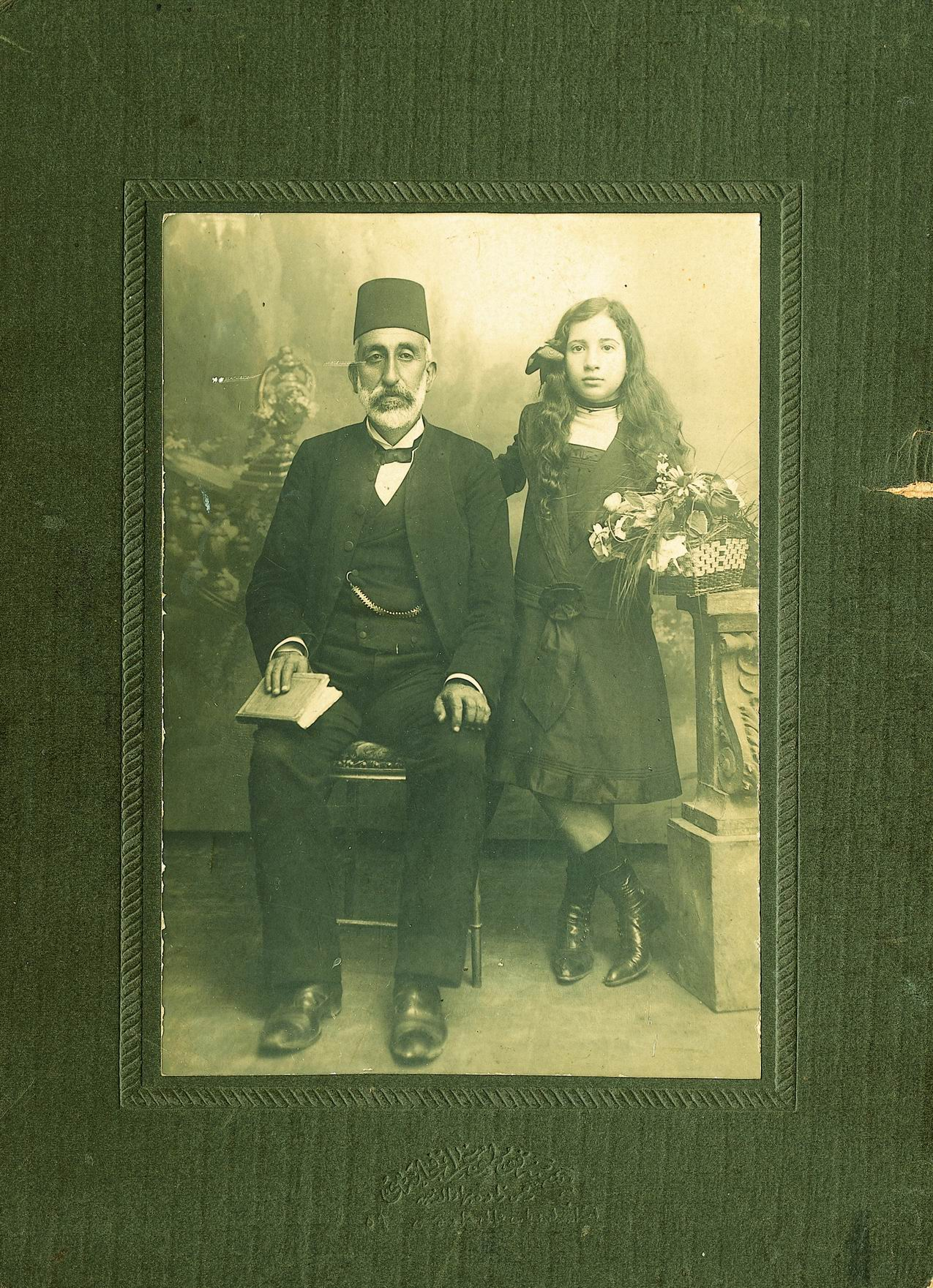
Şemsi Efendi, founder of the Işık Schools and the Mekteb-i Şemsi İptidai.

The history of the Feyziye Schools Foundation's Işık Schools (Turkish: Feyziye Mektepleri Vakfı Işık Okulları) began with the establishment of Feyz-i Sıbyan School (Turkish: Feyz-i Sıbyan Mektebi) in the city of Salonica on 14 December 1885. Over time, additional schools were established in Salonica, including the Şemsi Efendi School, which was attended by Mustafa Kemal Atatürk.

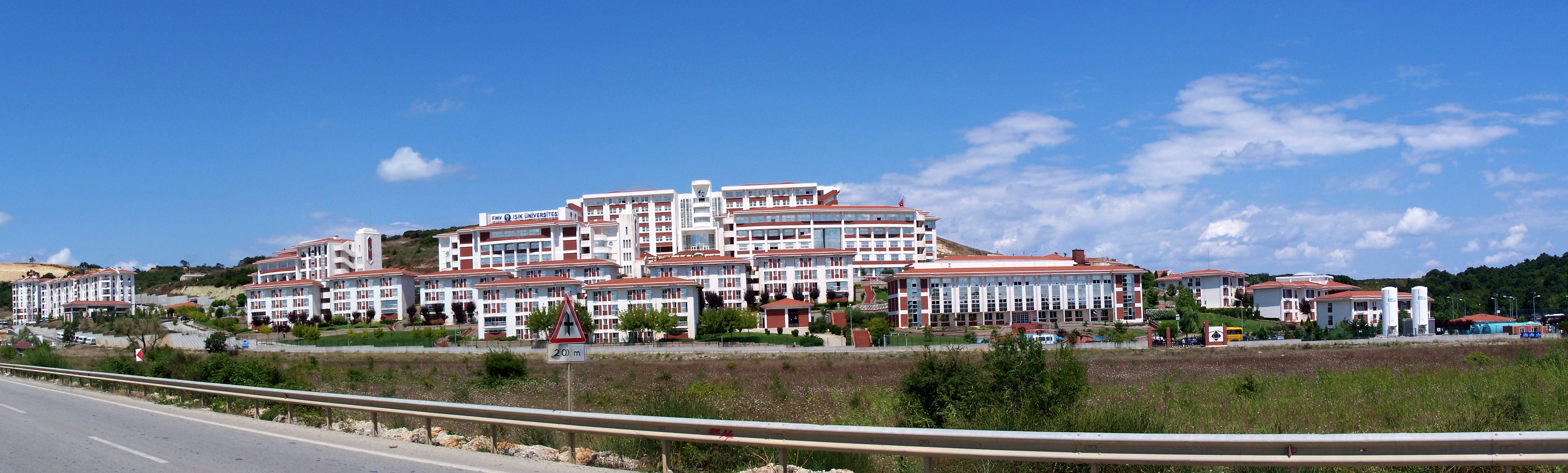
Panorama of the Işık University campus

After the Balkan Wars, when Salonica became part of Greece, the foundation relocated to Nişantaşı Naciye Sultan Mansion in Istanbul. In 1935, during the 50th anniversary of the school, the name was changed from "Feyziye" to "Işık," both meaning "light" in Turkish, with the endorsement of Mustafa Kemal Atatürk. To address the increasing demand for educational institutions, the foundation completed its Maslak campus in 1996.

Işık University was established at the Maslak campus at the beginning of the 1996–1997 academic year, marking a new chapter in the foundation's history. Işık University is governed by a board of trustees, in conjunction with the university president and provosts and the deans of the various faculties. Today, the Feyziye Schools Foundation provides education at all levels, from preschool to graduate studies.

== Campuses ==
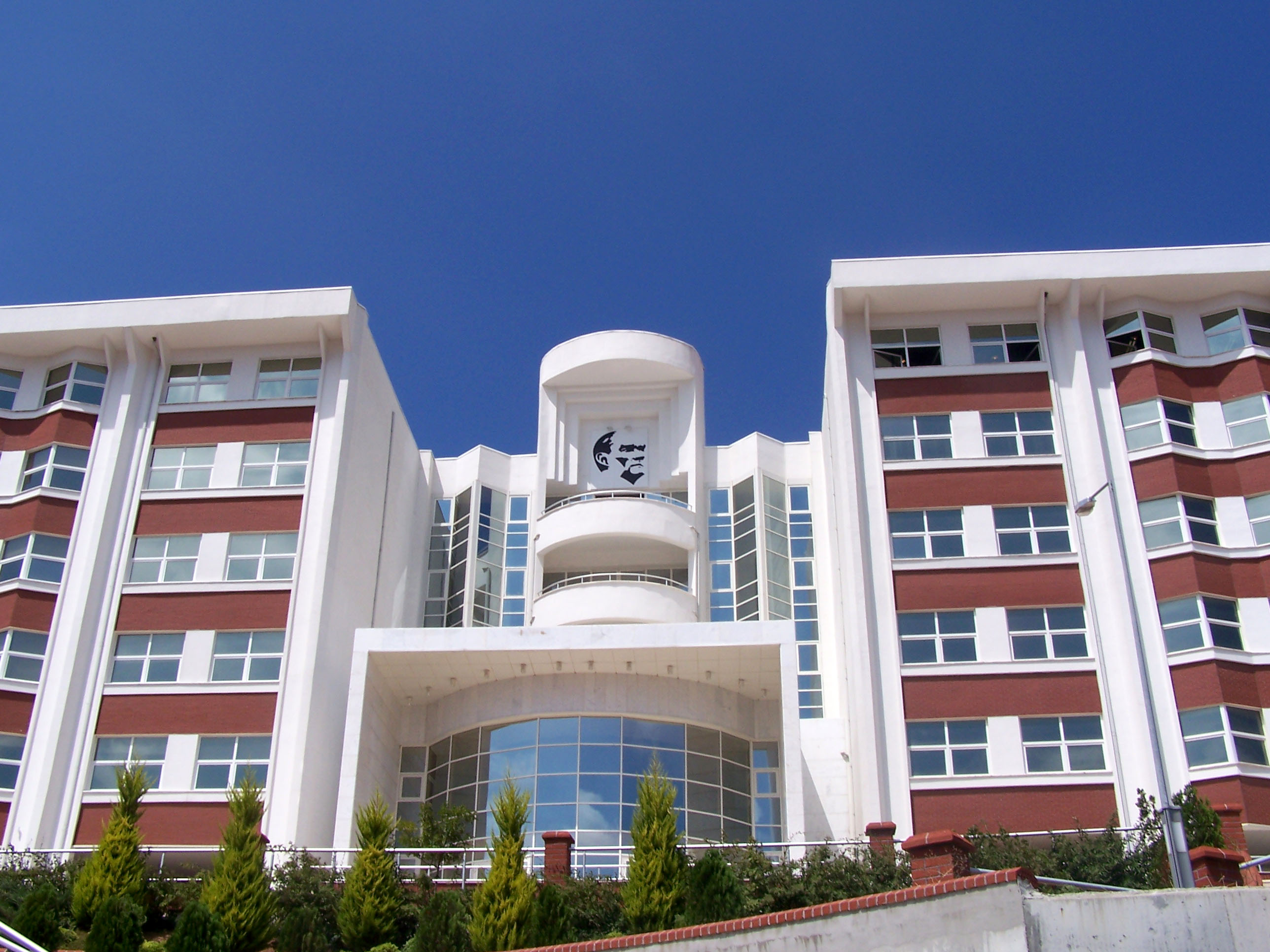
Classroom and Auditorium Building

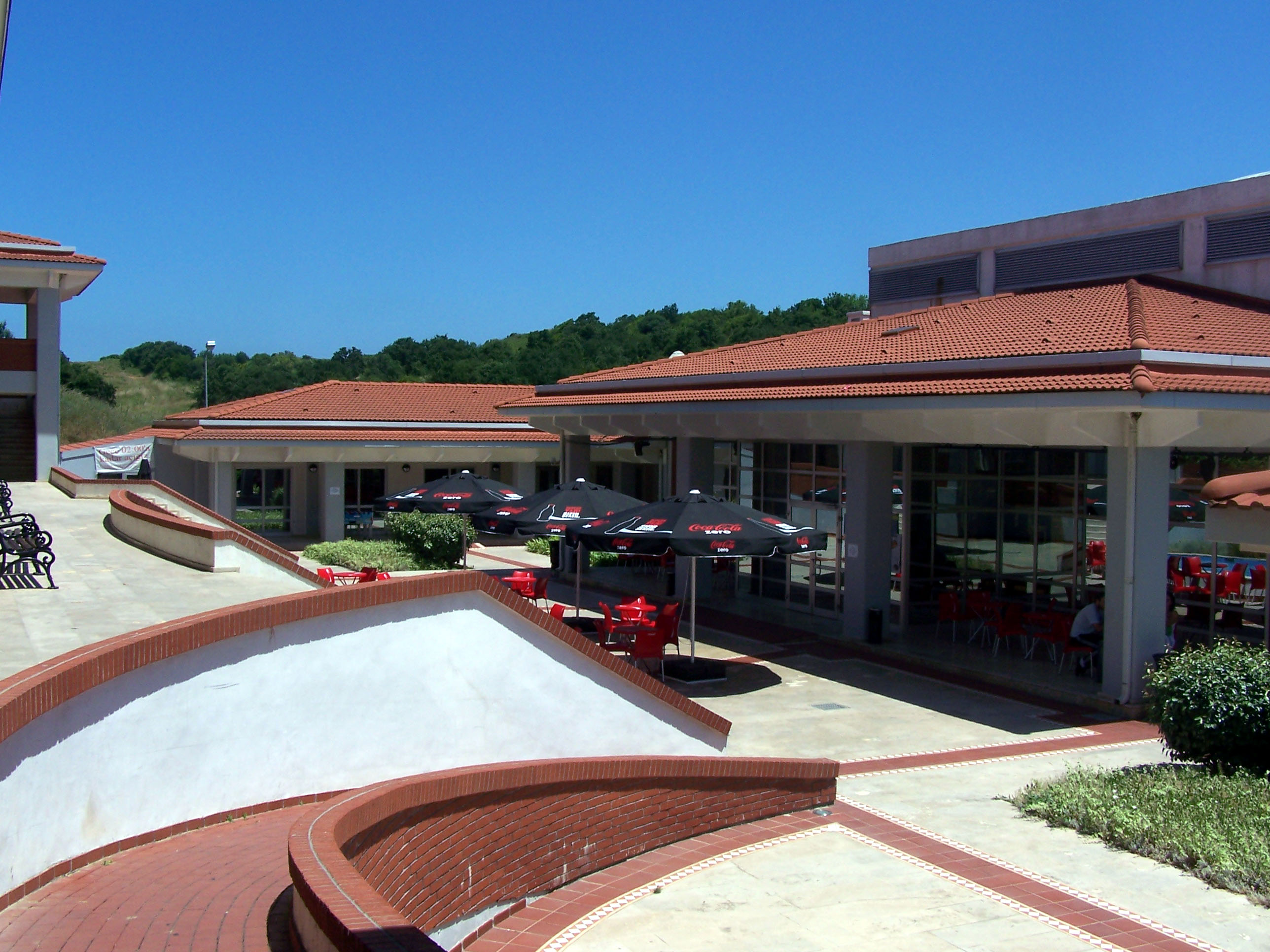
Social Center at the campus

Işık University operates two campuses. The Maslak campus is located in one of the business centers of Istanbul, while the suburban Şile campus, located 50 km (31 mi) out of Istanbul, opened in 2003. The Şile campus has been planned as a complete “educational campus” with dormitories, social facilities, and educational and administrative buildings situated in an area of 600 acres (2.4 km^{2}). In 2005 summer, most of the university's academic and administrative departments (including the rector) moved to the Şile campus. Three faculties (Faculty of Engineering, Faculty of Arts and Sciences, Faculty of Economic and Administrative Sciences) and two institutes (Institute of Science and Engineering and Institute of Social Sciences) are located in Şile Campus, but the Faculty of Fine Arts remains in Maslak.

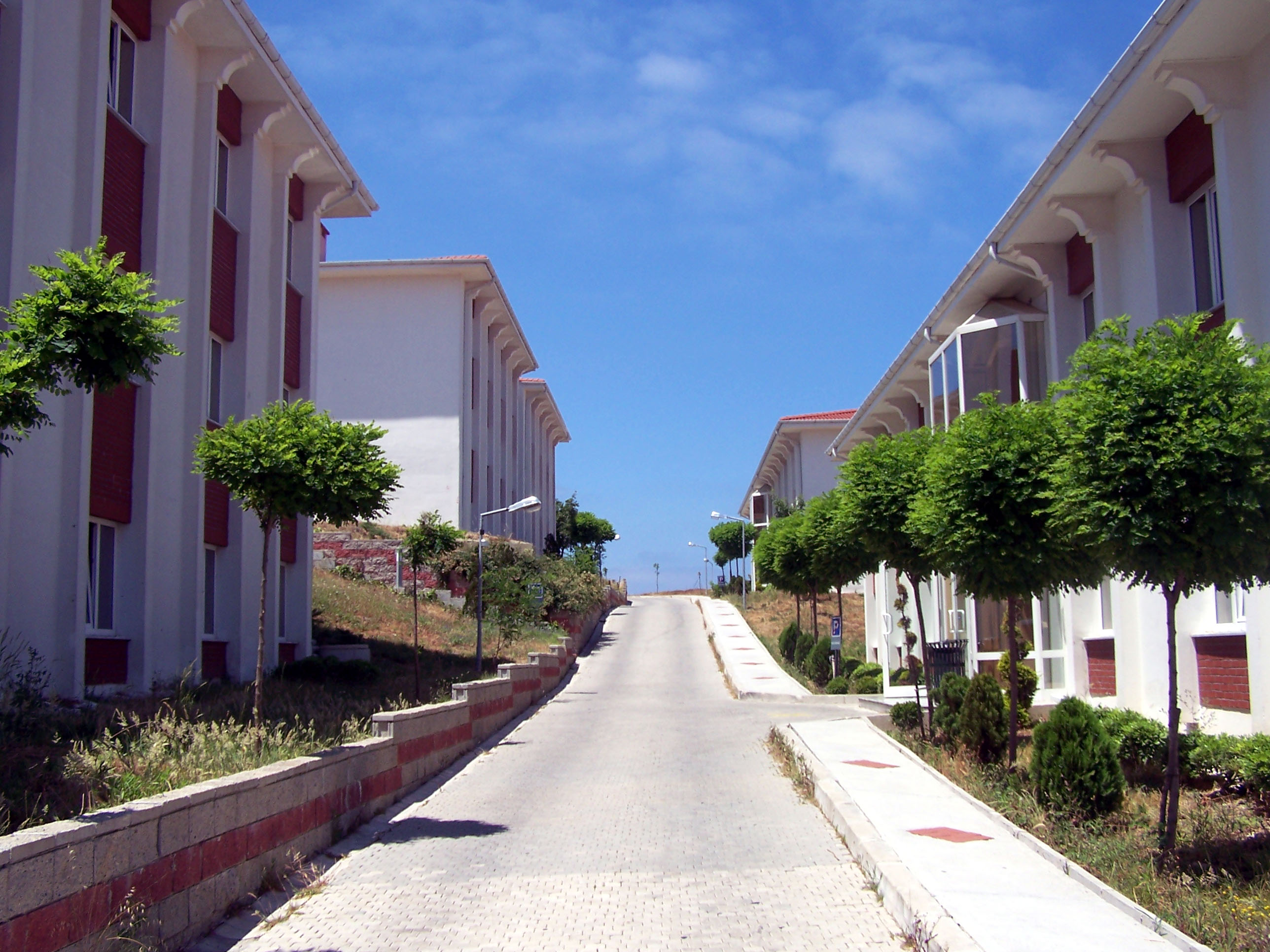
Blue Dormitories of the Işık University campus

== Faculties and Departments ==
Işık University is home to 5 faculties and 2 institutes.

- Faculty of Engineering: Computer Science and Engineering, Electronics Engineering, Industrial Engineering, Mechanical Engineering, Mathematics Engineering, Civil Engineering, Software Engineering
- Faculty of Arts and Sciences: Mathematics, Mathematical Engineering, Physics, Information Technologies, Management Information Systems, Humanities and Social Sciences
- Faculty of Economic and Administrative Sciences: Management, International Trade, Economics, Political Sciences, International Relations
- Faculty of Fine Arts: Graphic Arts and Graphical Design, Visual Arts, Interior Architecture, Industrial and Industrial Products Design, Fashion and Textile Design
- Institute of Science and Engineering: Computer Engineering Programme (M.S., Ph.D.), Electronics Engineering Programme (M.S., Ph.D.), Mathematics Programme (M.S., Ph.D.), Information Technologies Programme (M.S.), Physics Programme (M.S.)
- Institute of Social Sciences: Management Programme (M.A.), Management Information Systems Programme (M.S.), Middle East Studies Programme (M.A.), Contemporary Business Administration Programme (Ph.D.)

The university also incorporates an English as a Foreign Language School and a research center, namely Informatics Research and Development Center.

== See also ==
- List of universities in Turkey
