= Riva Castle =

Byzantine coastal fort on the hill beside of Riva River

Coordinates: 41.2240°N 29.2173°E

Riva Castle (Turkish: Riva Kalesi), is a Byzantine coastal fortification situated on a hill where Riva Creek meets the Black Sea in Riva, Beykoz, Istanbul. In Greek mythology, the leader of the Argo sailors, Iason, searching for the Golden Fleece received the iron anchor, hence the village was referred to as Ancyranum during the reign of the Eastern Roman Empire.

The Ottoman Sultan Bayezid I referred to the importance of occupying it after taking over its neighboring castles, Yoros and Şile in 1391 AD (793 AH). It was first recorded in the archives as Revan Kalesi in 1778-1779 AD (1192 AH).
