= Ağva =

- Neighbourhood
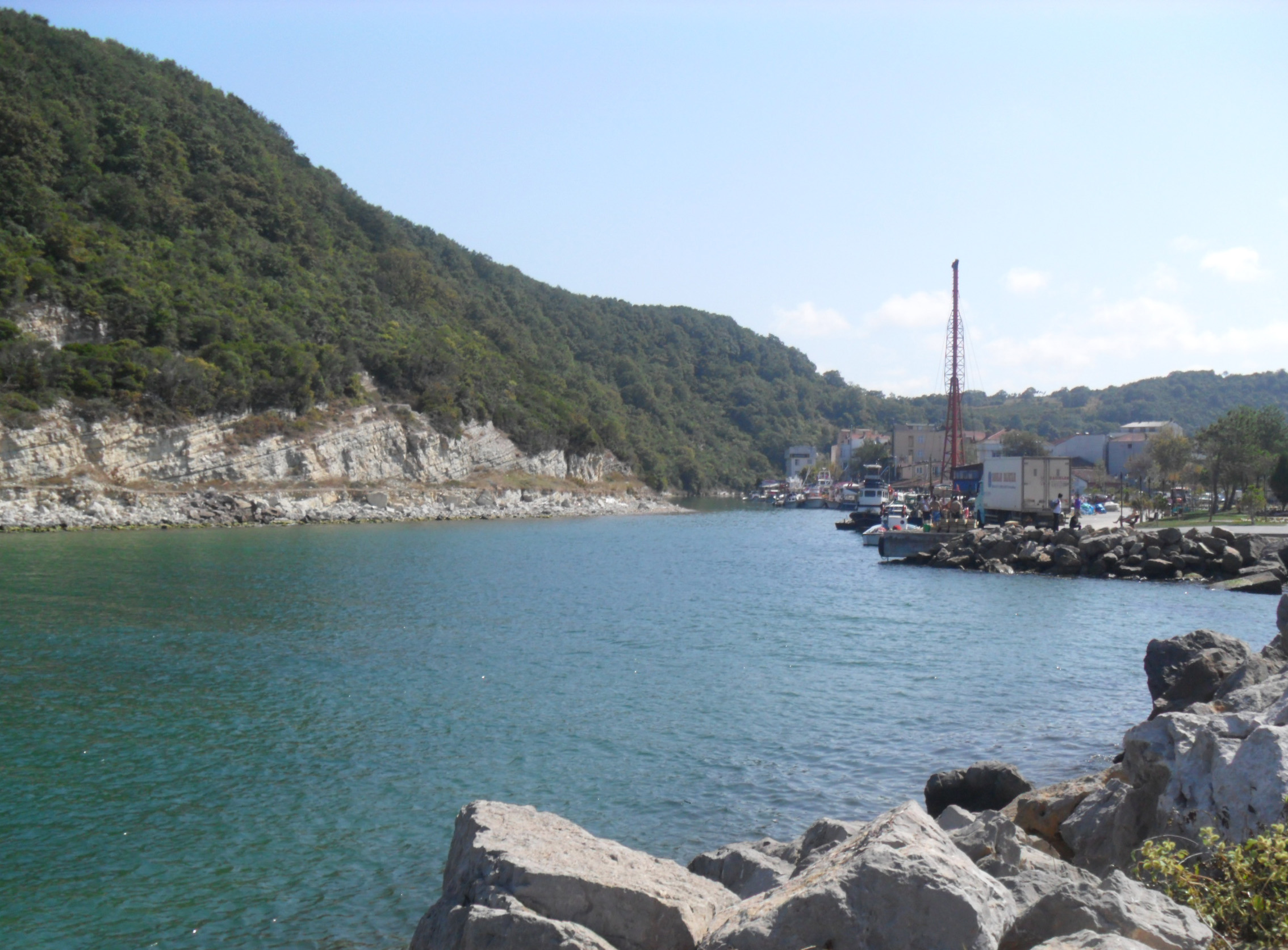
- Yeşilçay in Ağva

- Location within Turkey Location within Istanbul
- Coordinates: 41°08′N 29°51′E
- Country: Turkey
- Province: Istanbul
- District: Şile
- Population (2022): 2,150
- Time zone: UTC+3 (TRT)
- Postal code: 34990
- Area code: 0216

Ağva is a neighbourhood and resort town in the municipality and district of Şile, Istanbul Province, Turkey. Its population is 2,150 (2022).

== History ==
It was an independent municipality until it was merged into the municipality of Şile in 2008.

== Geography ==
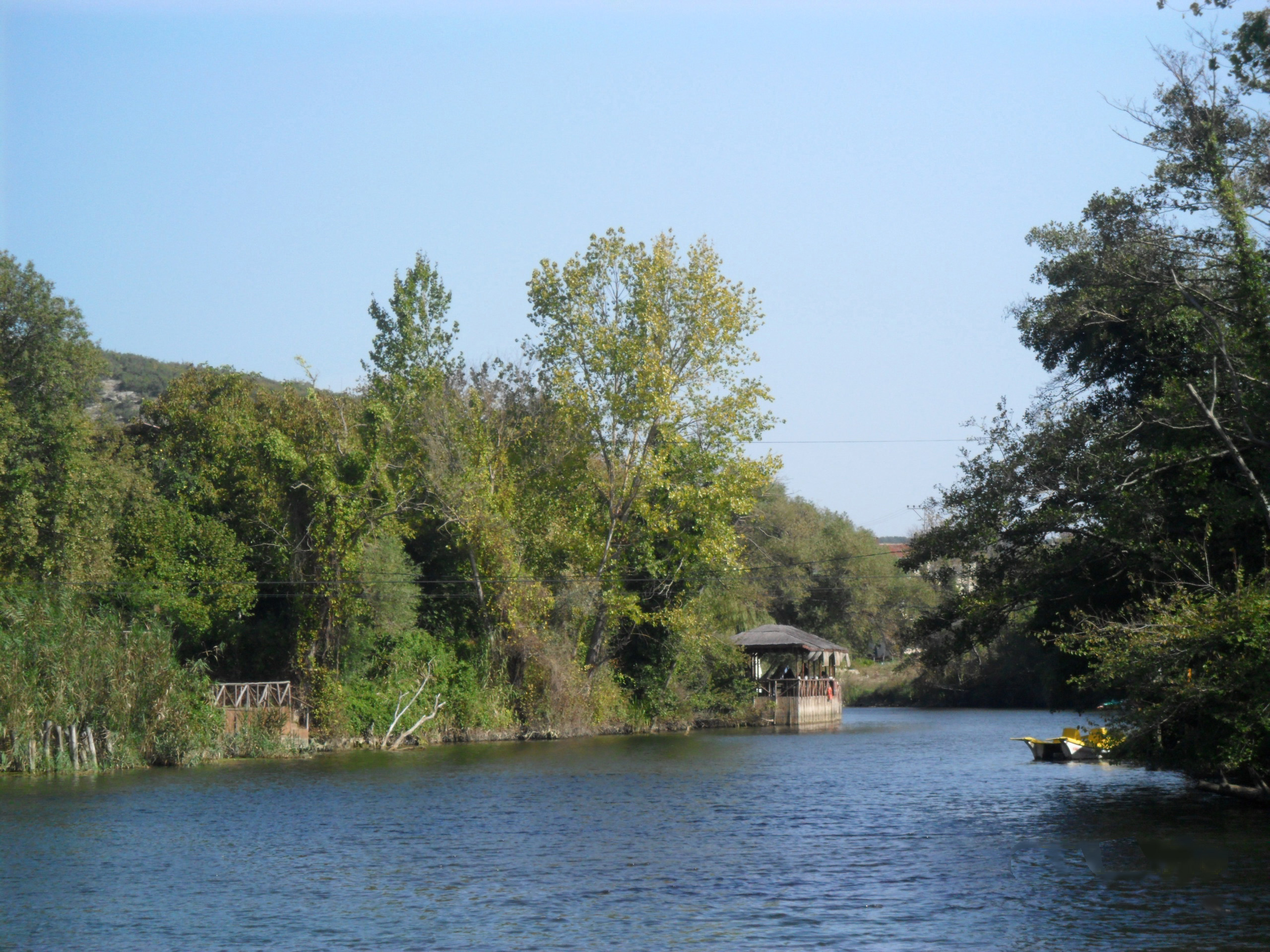
Göksu River in Ağva

Ağva is a coastal place at Black Sea, situated between two rivers, Göksu in the west and Yeşilçay in the east. In fact, the name Ağva means "between the rivers". Yeşilçay is known as one of the main sources of Istanbul urban water system, the Yeşilçay Drinking Water Plant.

Its distance to Istanbul centrum is 97 km (60 mi) and to Şile 38 km (24 mi).

== Living ==
With a picturesque scenery, Ağva is one of the popular resorts of Istanbul. In addition to the 2.5 kilometres (1.6 mi) beach there are many boarding houses and restaurants. Göksu River is well known for boat excursions and the settlement became shooting place in a number of television serials.

Population of Ağva rises during the summers. The resort hosts around 15,000 people in the summer time. Up to 2009, Ağva was the seat of a township being a municipality since 1992. After the local elections in 2009, it lost its town status due to decreased population below limit. It was declared a neighborhood of Şile district. As of 2022, its population is 2,150.

== Economy ==
Thanks to woodlands around the settlement, Ağva was known as Istanbul's main source for charcoal up to the 1950s. Today, tourism plays an important role in addition to weaving of Şile cloth at hand looms and cultivation of vegetables and fruit.

== See also ==
- Yeşilçay Drinking Water Plant
