= Şile Castle =

Castle in Turkey

- Şile Kalesi
- Şile, Istanbul, Turkey
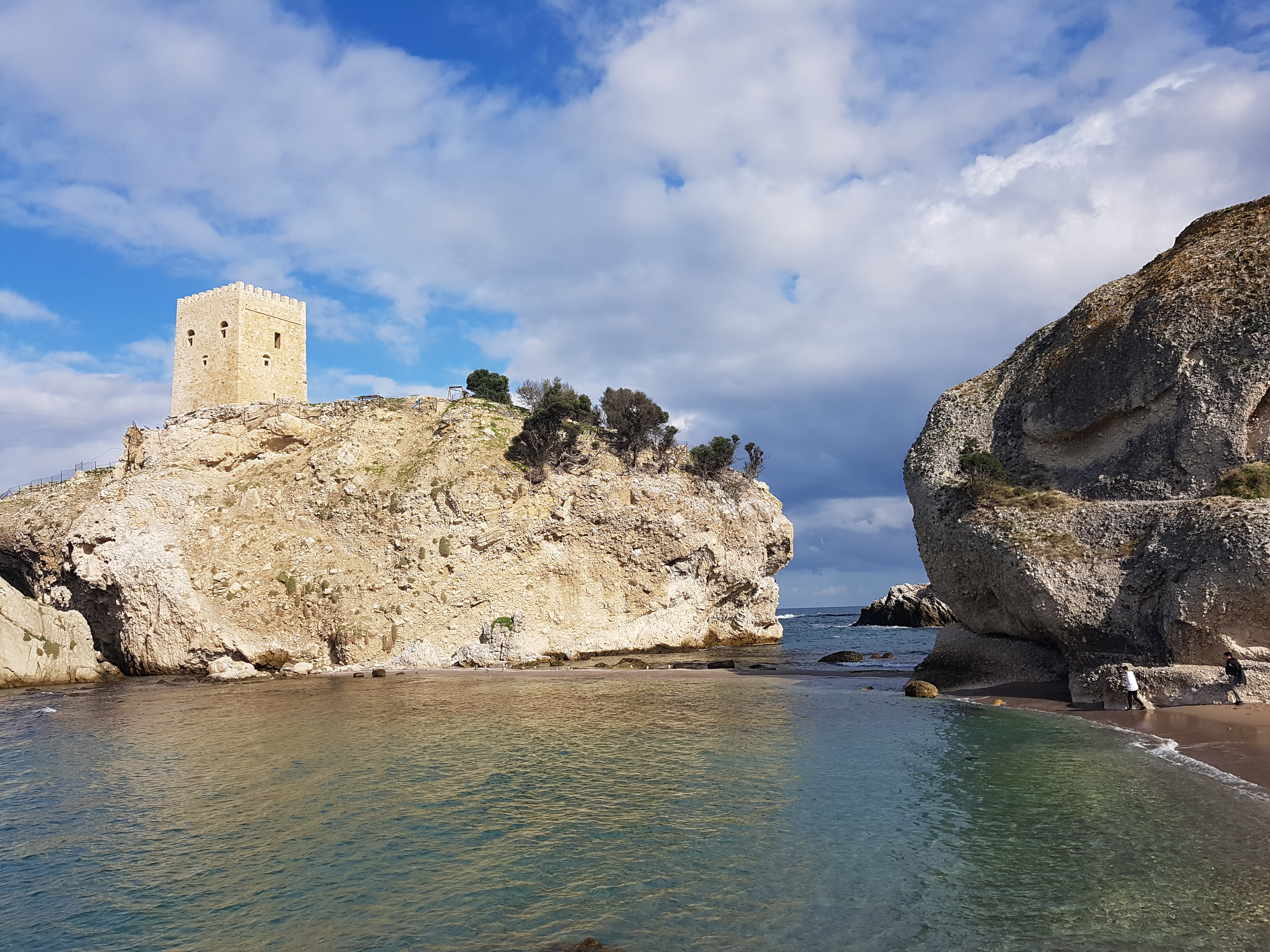
- Şile Castle on the island (left)

Site information
- Type: Fortress

Location
- Coordinates: 41°10′53″N 29°36′33″E

Şile Castle (Turkish: Şile Kalesi) or Ocaklı Ada Castle is a castle located on Ocaklı Island in the Şile district of Istanbul. It was criticized for its appearance after the restoration of 2015 because it looked like SpongeBob SquarePants.

== History ==
There are two different claims about the history of the building, which was built as a watchtower. According to the claim accepted today, it was built 1000 years ago by the Genoese. According to another claim, it was built by the Eastern Roman Empire and later used by the Ottomans. The castle, which was taken over by the Genoese in 1305, was conquered by the Ottoman army under the command of Yıldırım Bayezid in 1396. The castle has been repaired at least twice throughout history.

== See also ==
- Yoros Castle
- Riva Castle
