= Yoros Castle =

Byzantine ruins in northeast Istanbul

Coordinates: 41.179°N 29.094°E

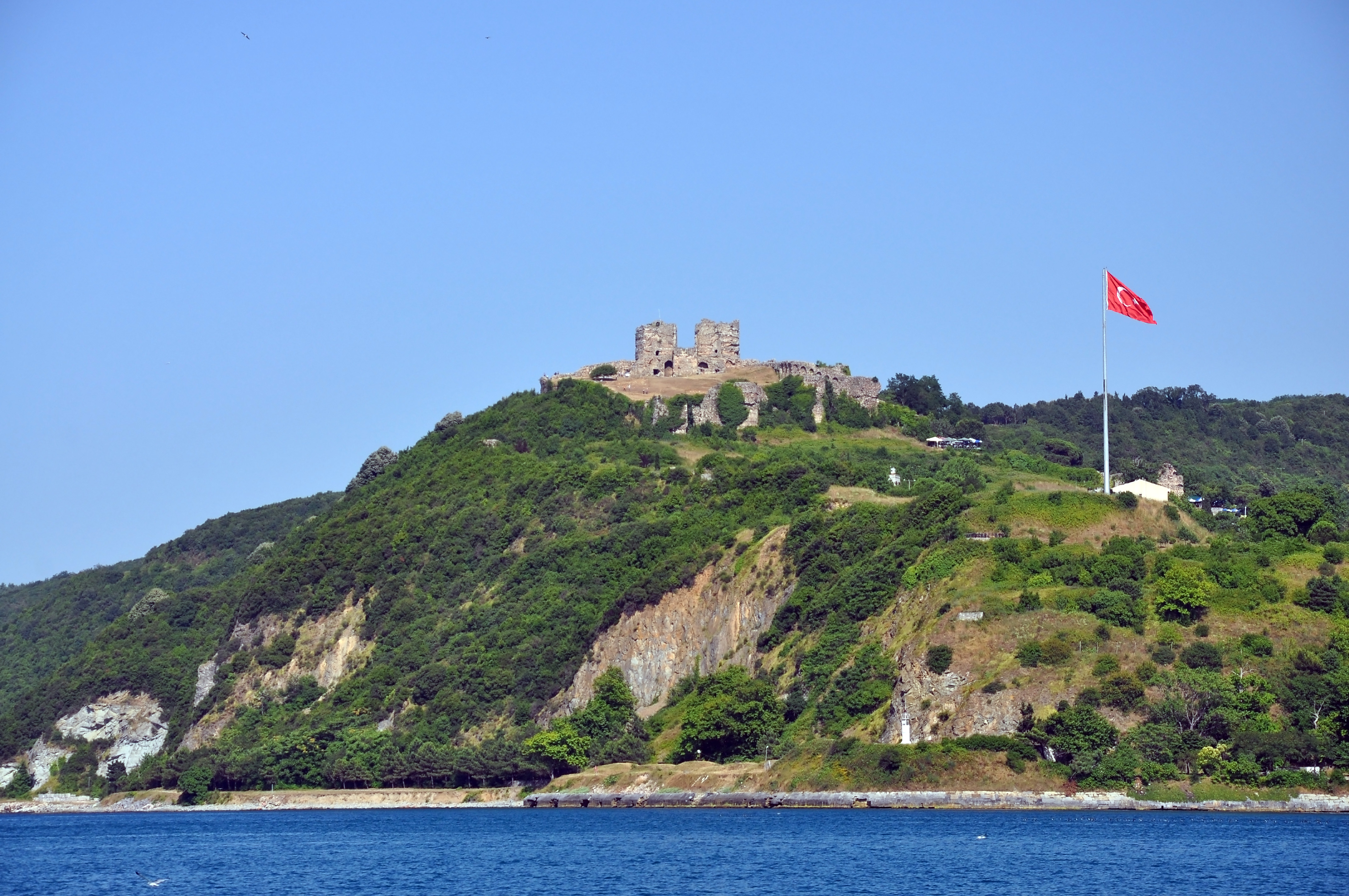
Yoros Castle, Anadolu Kavağı, Beykoz, Istanbul.

Yoros Castle (Turkish: Yoros Kalesi) is a ruined castle dating back to Byzantine times that stands above the confluence of the Bosphorus and the Black Sea, to the north of Joshua's Hill, in Beykoz district, Istanbul, Turkey. It is commonly referred to as the Genoese Castle, due to Genoa’s possession of it in the mid-15th century.

== Geography ==
Yoros Castle sits on a hill surrounded by steep bluffs overlooking the confluence of the Bosphorus and the Black Sea. It is just north of a small fishing village called Anadolu Kavağı, on Macar Bay, and the entire area is referred to as Anadolu Kavağı. The castle overlooks one of the narrowest stretches of the Bosphorus, and on the opposite shore is Rumeli Kavağı, which formerly held a fortification similar to Yoros Castle. (Anadolu and Rumeli were Ottoman terms for the Anatolian and European parts of the empire).

Since 2016 the Third Bosphorus Bridge has been visible from Yoros Castle.

== History ==
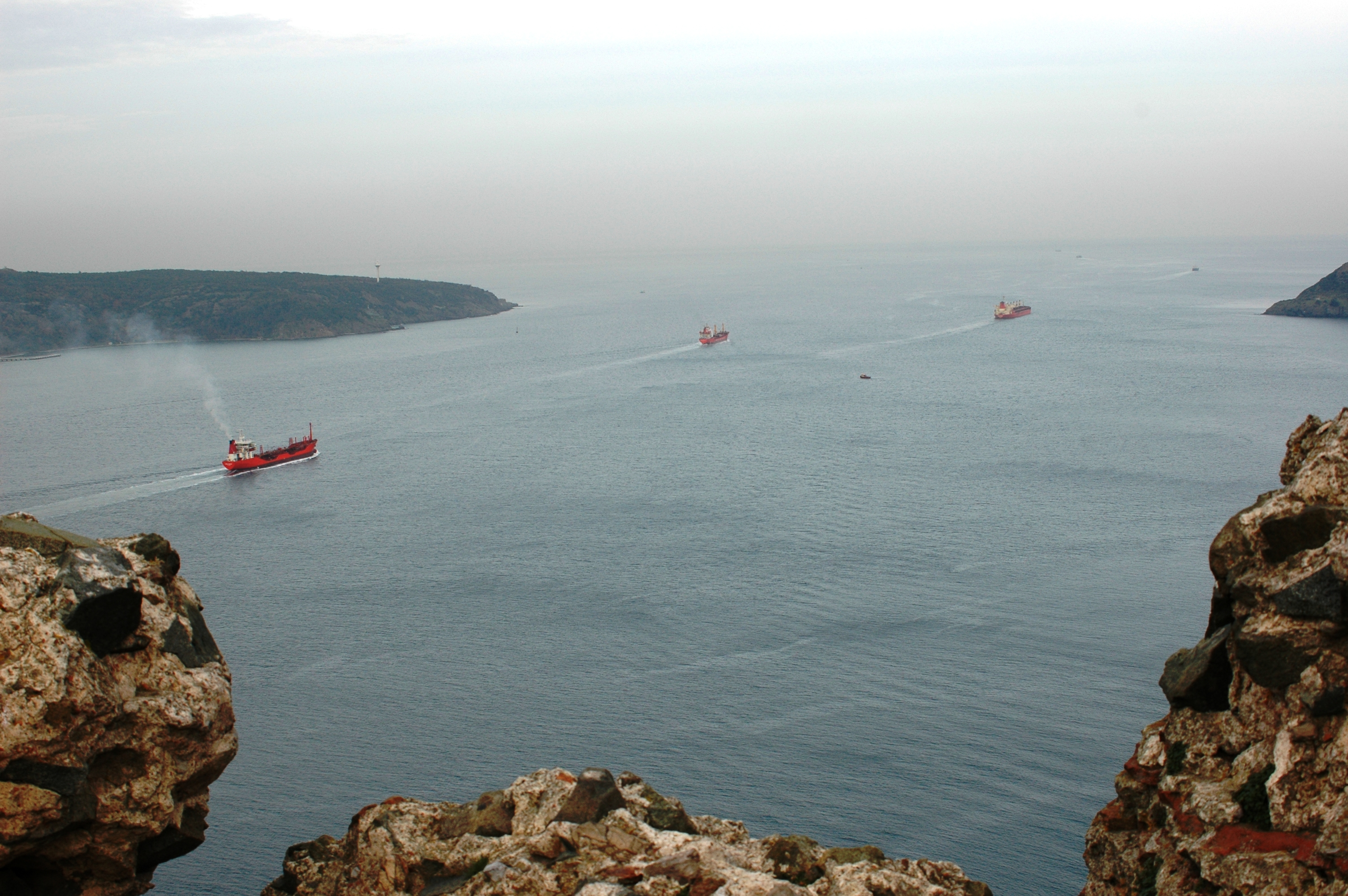
The confluence of the Bosphorus and the Black Sea, as seen from Yoros Castle, revealing its highly strategic location.

The future site of Yoros Castle was originally settled by the Phoenicians and Greeks for trading and military purposes. The Greeks called the area Hieron (Sacred Place). The remains of temples, including to Dios, to the Altar of the Twelve Gods, and to Zeus Ourios (Zeus, granter of fair winds) Belonging to the BCE era have been discovered here.

Yoros Castle was intermittently occupied throughout the course of the Byzantine Empire. Under the Palaiologos dynasty in its later years, Yoros Castle was strongly fortified, as was the castle on the opposite side of the Bosphorus. A massive chain could be extended between these two points, cutting the Strait off from enemy warships in the same way that the chain across the Golden Horn was used to defend Constantinople during the last Ottoman siege by Sultan Mehmed II.

The Byzantines, Genoese and Ottomans fought over this castle for centuries. It was first captured by Ottoman forces in 1305, but was retaken by the Byzantines shortly afterwards. Sultan Bayezid I took the castle again in 1391 while preparing for his siege of Constantinople, and it was used as a base during the construction of Anadolu Hisarı, which was to prove more important in the eventual successful siege. In 1399 the Byzantines attempted to take back Yoros Castle. The attack failed, but the village of Anadolu Kavağı was burned to the ground. The Ottomans held the fortress from 1391–1414, losing it to the Genoese in 1414. Their forty-year occupation gave the castle its commonly used nickname - the Genoese Castle.

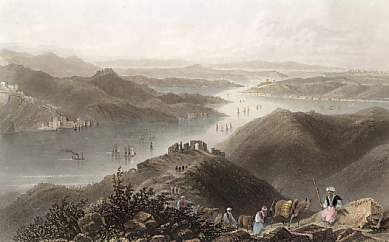
The Bosphorus, opposite the Genoese Castle, Turkey. Original steel engraving by William Henry Bartlett, 1838.

After Sultan Mehmed II’s conquest of Constantinople in 1453, the presence of the Genoese in such a strategic location posed a threat to the new Ottoman capital and within a few years they were driven out. Mehmed II then refortified the walls, and constructed a customs office, a quarantine centre and a check point, as well as garrisoning the site. Bayezid II (1481–1512) later added a mosque within the castle walls.

Cossack raids plagued the Ottoman Empire from time to time. In 1624 a fleet of 150 Cossack caiques sailed across the Black Sea to attack Bosphorus towns and villages. Sultan Murad IV (1623–1640) refortified Anadolu Kavağı as a defence against them. This proved instrumental in securing the region against such seaborne raids.

Under Osman III (1754–1757), Yoros Castle was once again refortified. Later, in 1783 Abdülhamid I added more watchtowers. After this time, the castle gradually fell into disrepair. By the time the Turkish Republic was declared in 1923, it was no longer in use.

== Present day ==
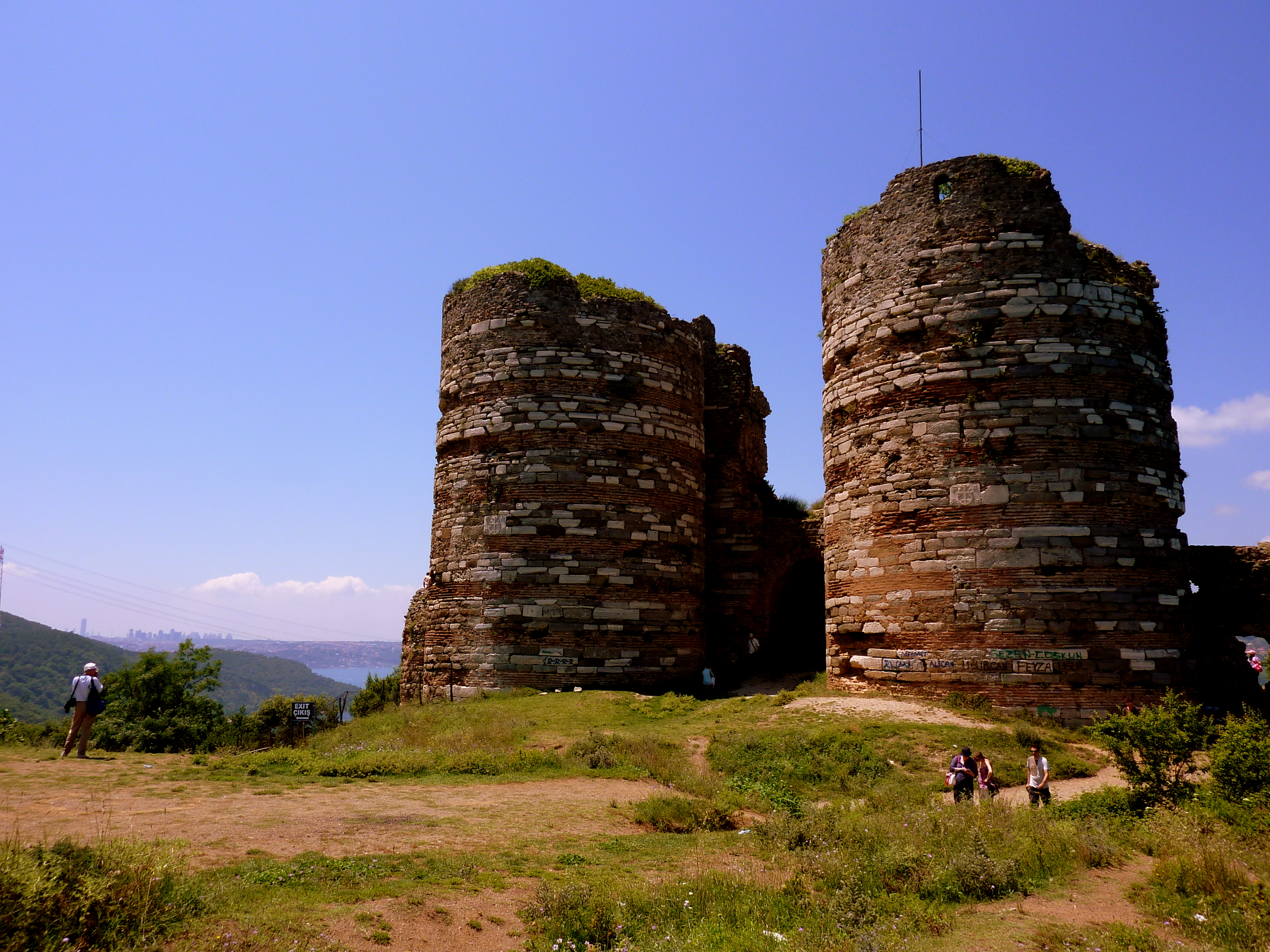
The main entrance to Yoros Castle.

The ruins of the citadel and its surrounding walls still exist, although the mosque, most of the towers and other structures have been lost. Greek inscriptions remain carved on the walls to this day, along with the symbol of the Palaiologos family, who ruled Byzantium until its fall.

Yoros Castle and the village of Anadolu Kavağı make a popular day trip from the centre of Istanbul. From 2018 to 2021 excavations were carried out at the castle but it is now open to the public again.

The surroundings of the castle are a military area and closed to visitors.

== Gallery ==
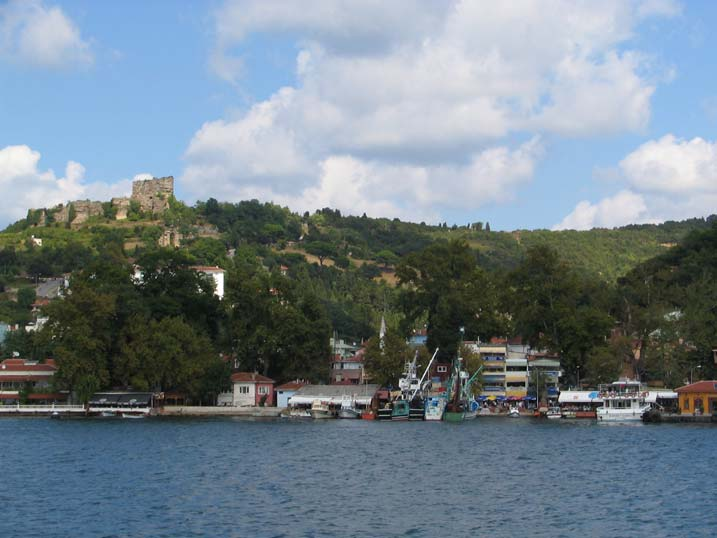
The last ferry stop on the Asian side of the Bosphorus is Anadolu Kavağı, with Yoros Castle on the hill overlooking the Black Sea.

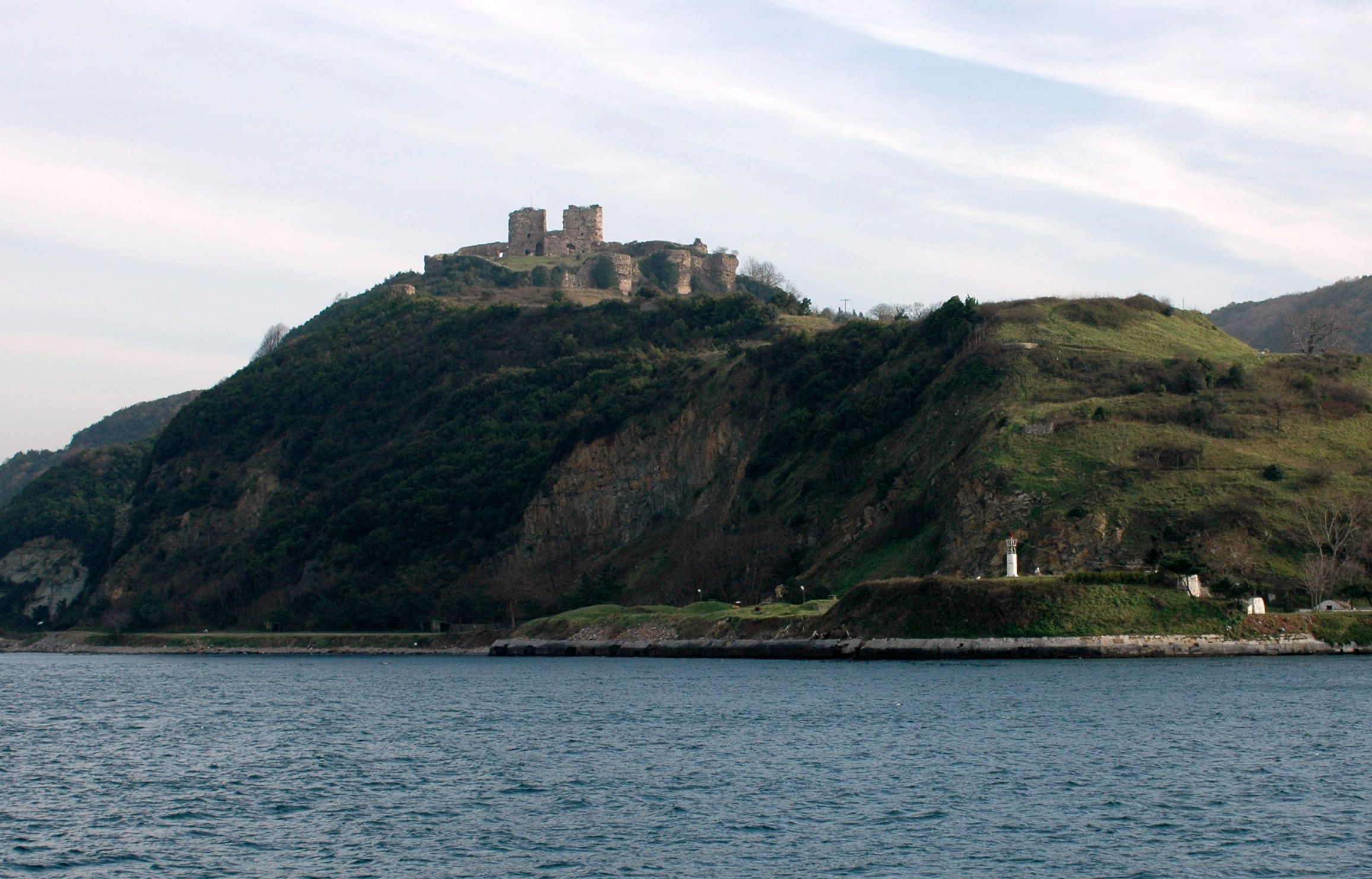
The ruins of Yoros Castle

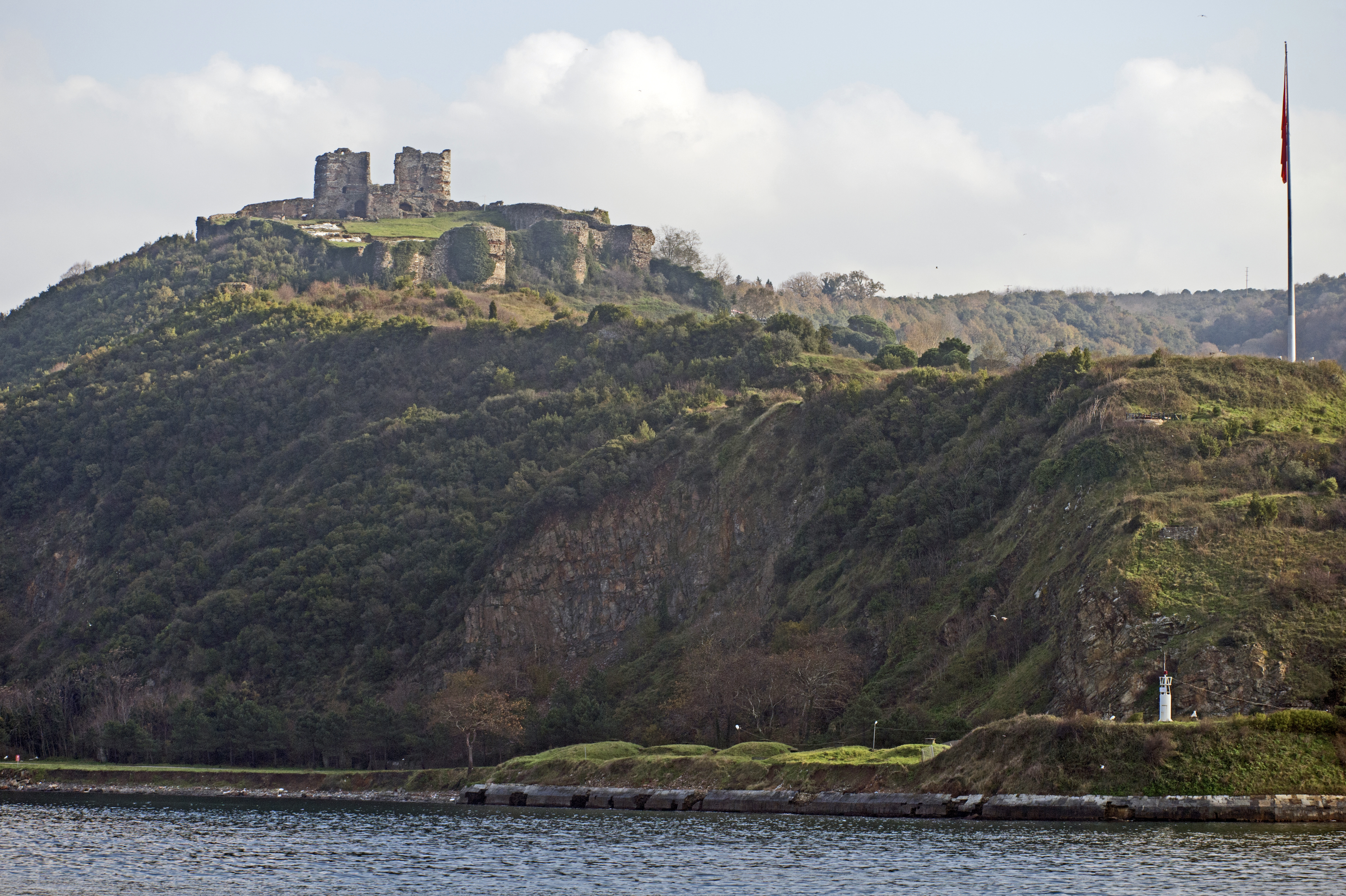
Yoros Castle seen from Bosporus

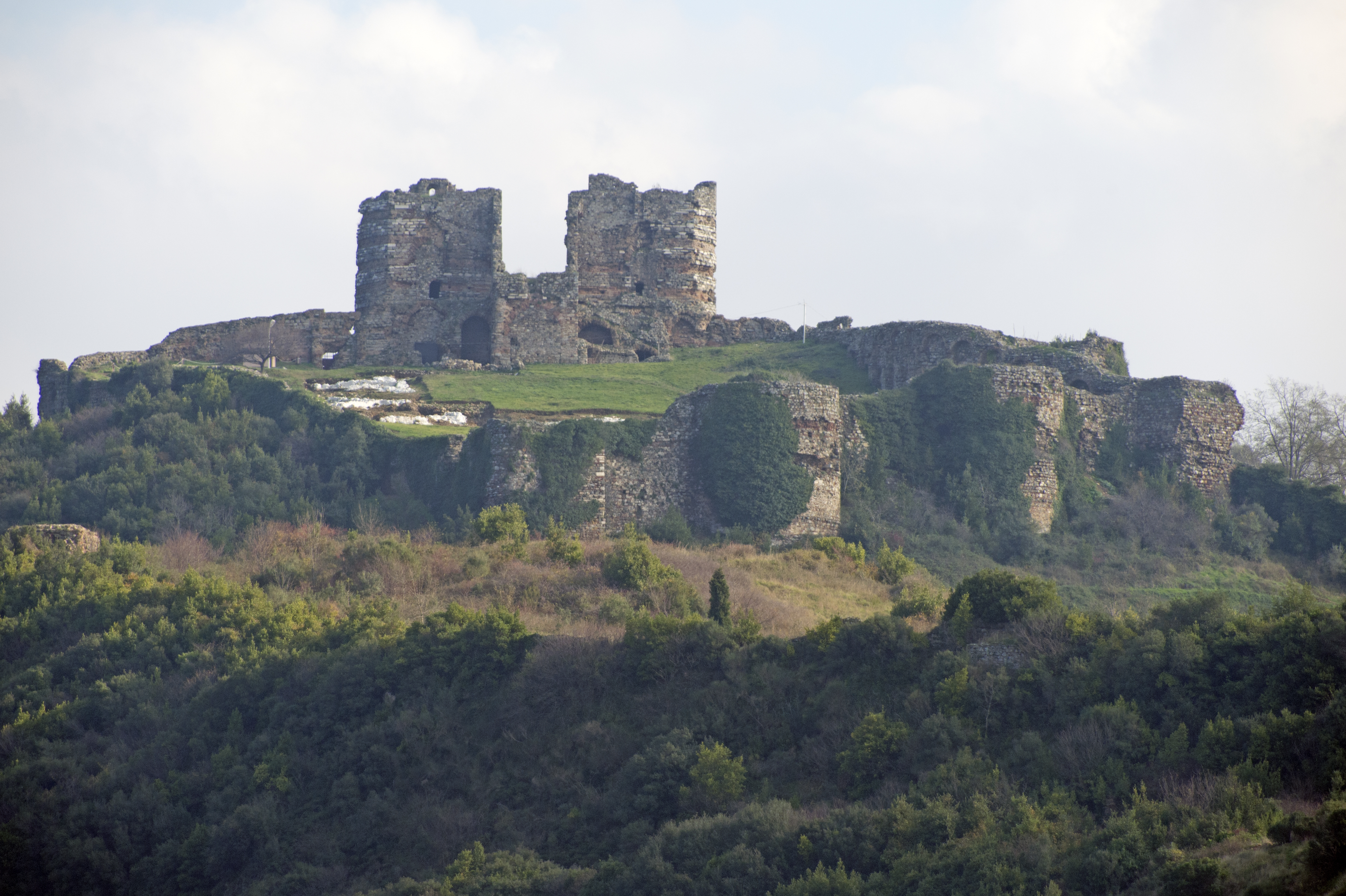
Yoros Castle view

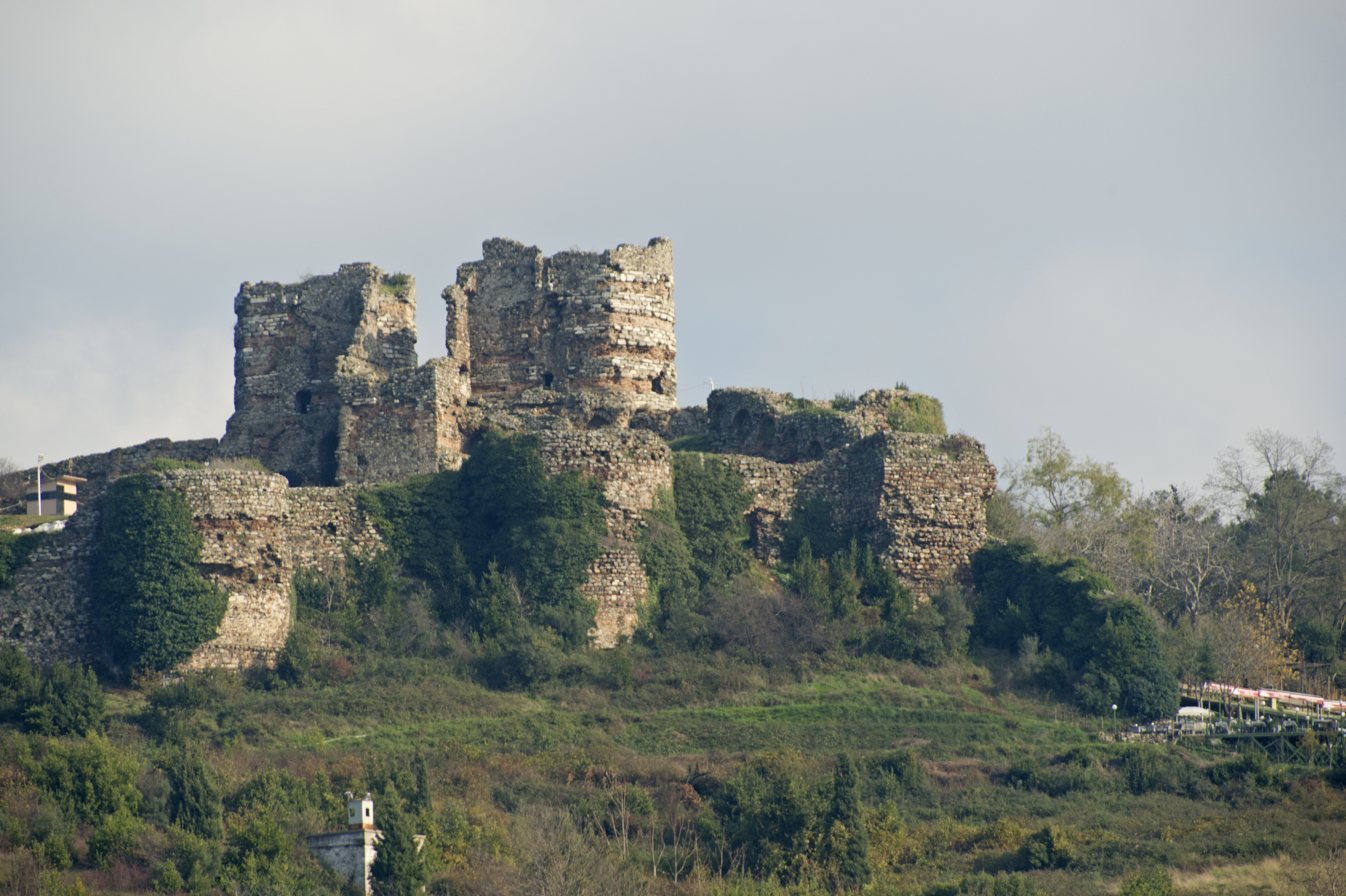
Yoros Castle from side

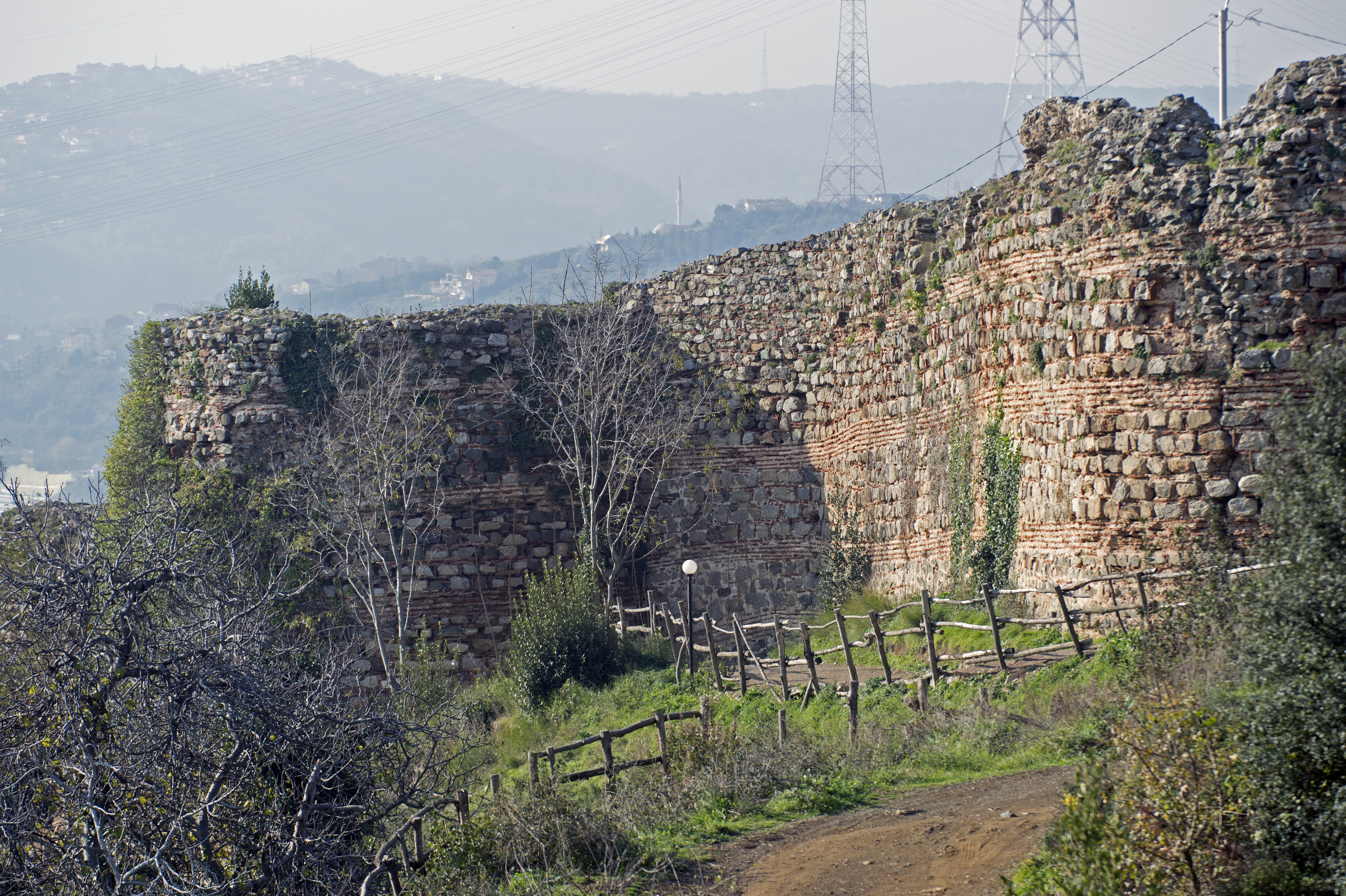
Yoros Castle side

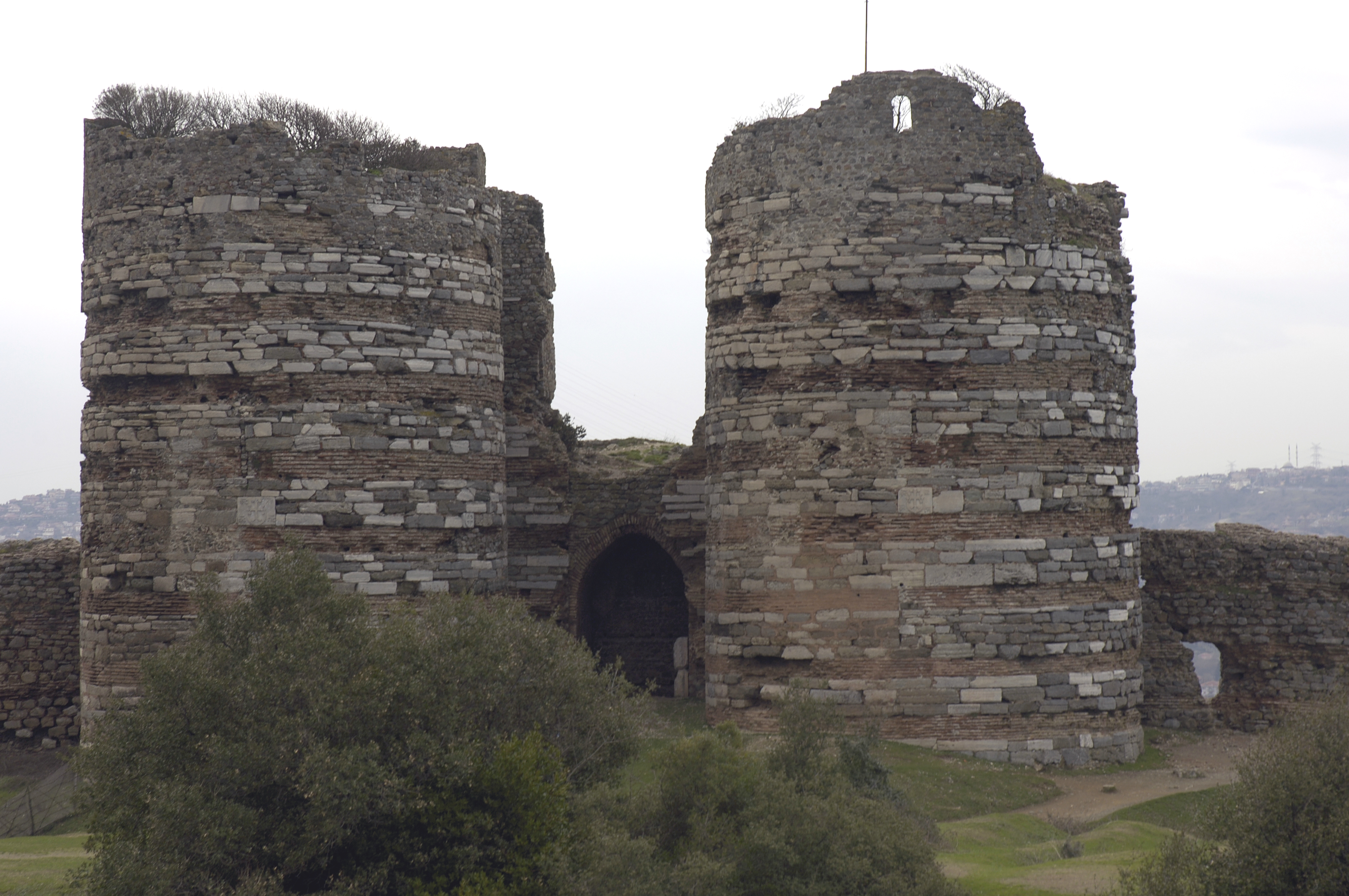
Yoros Castle gates in front

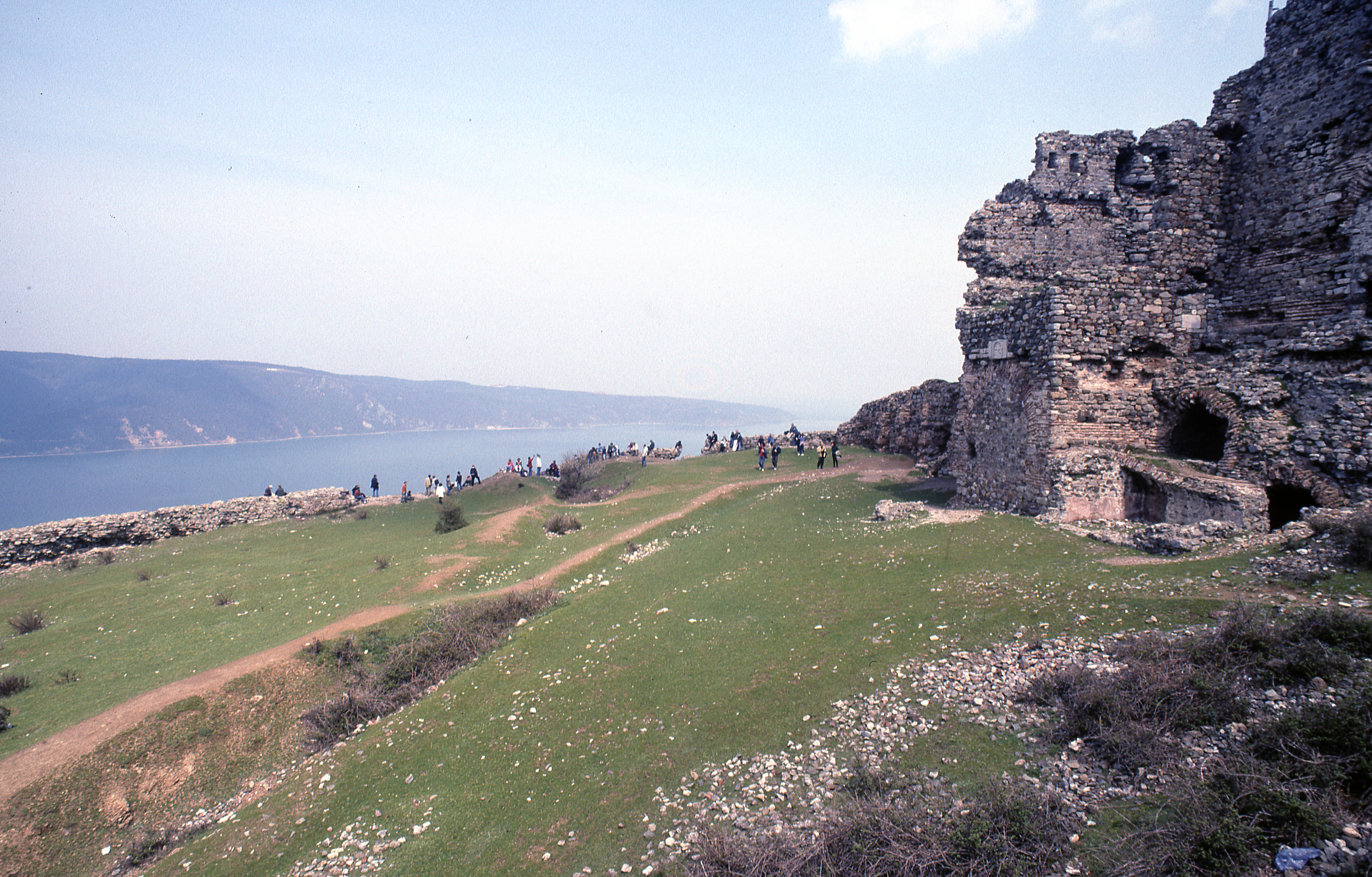
Yoros Castle inside walls, Bosporus view

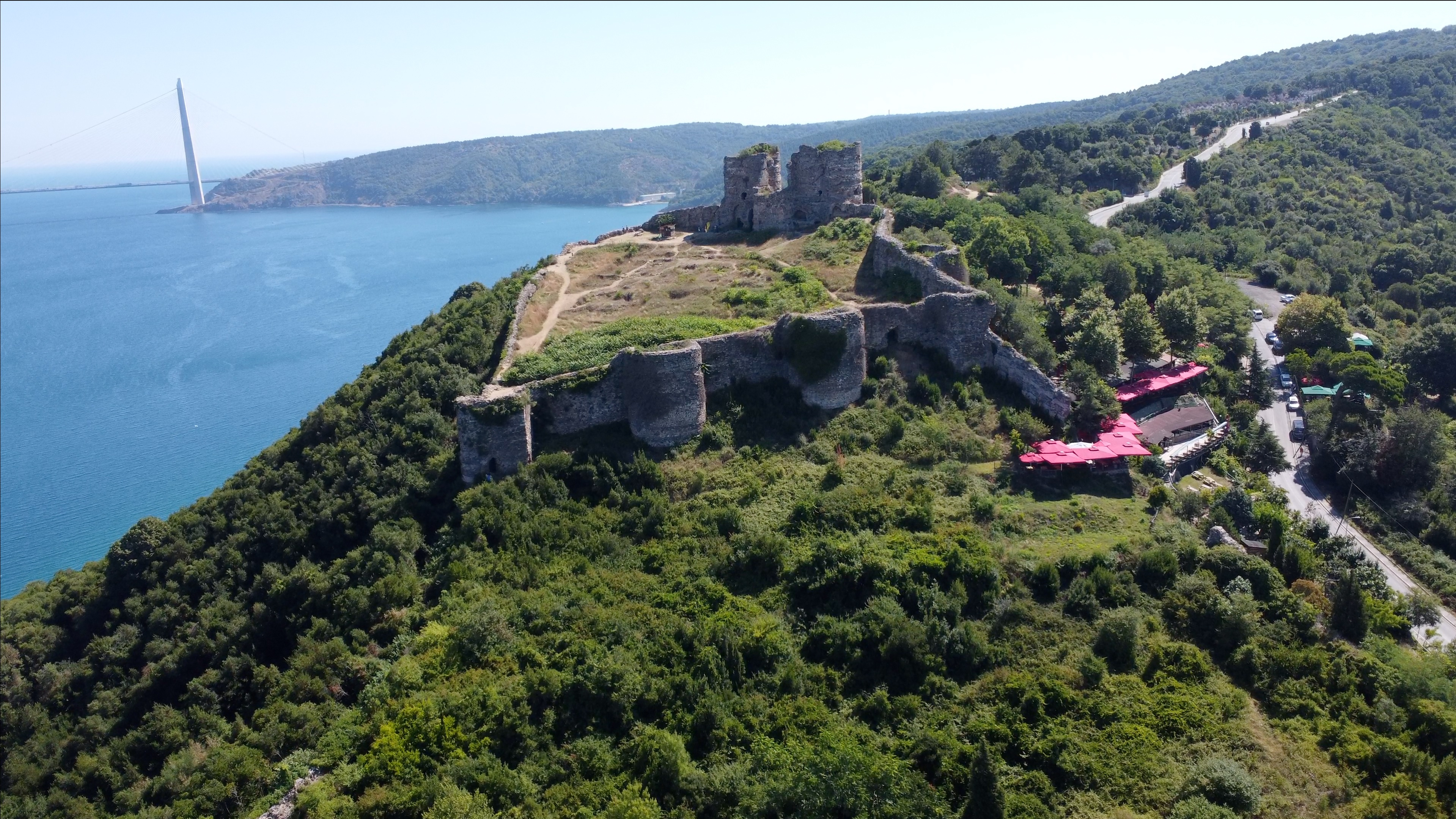
Yoros Castle from Drone

== See also ==
- Riva Castle
- Şile Castle
- Rumeli Kavağı
