= Şile =

- District and municipality
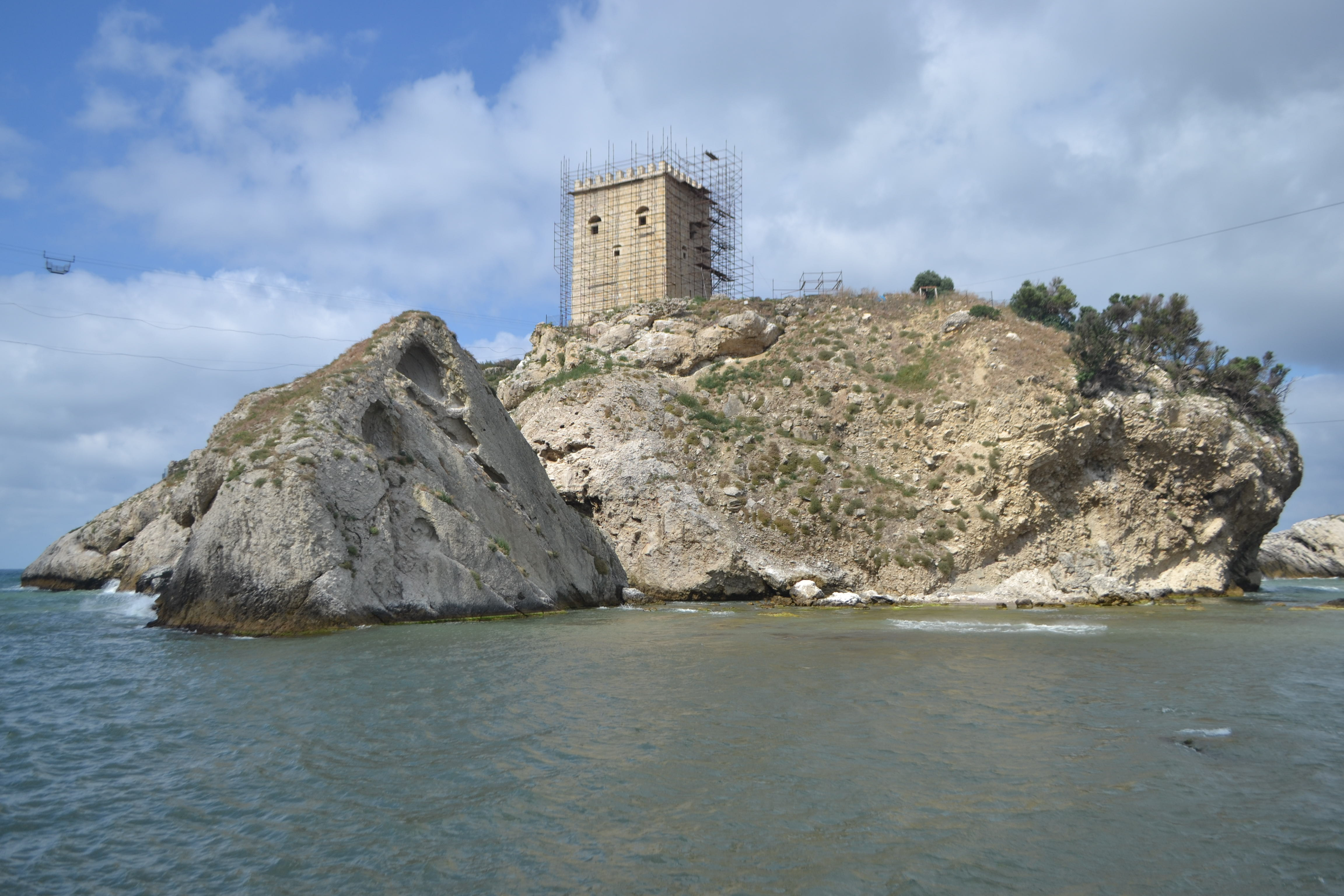
- Şile castle while it was under restoration

- Logo

- Map showing Şile District in Istanbul Province

- Location within Turkey Location within Istanbul
- Coordinates: 41°10′35″N 29°36′46″E
- Country: Turkey
- Province: Istanbul

Government
  - Mayor: Sacit Terzi (acting) (AKP)
- Area: 800 km^{2} (310 sq mi)
- Population (2022): 43,464
  - Density: 54/km^{2} (140/sq mi)
- Time zone: UTC+3 (TRT)
- Postal code: 34980
- Area code: 0216
- Website: www.sile.bel.tr

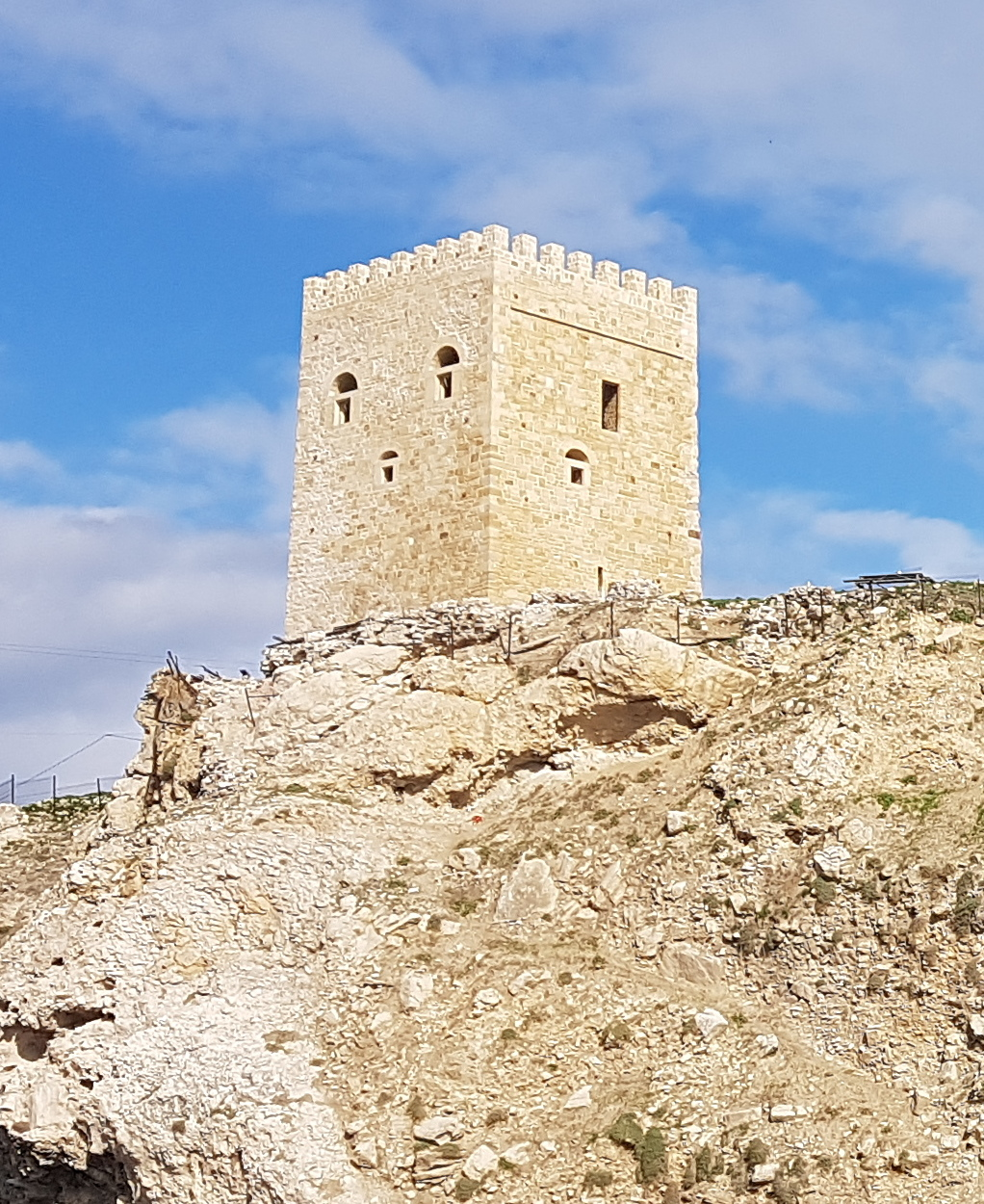
Şile Castle is a restored castle in the Şile district on Ocaklı Island

Şile is a municipality and district of Istanbul Province, Turkey. Its area is 800 km^{2}, and its population is 43,464 (2022). Bordering Şile is the province of Kocaeli (districts of Gebze, Körfez, Derince, Kandıra) to the east and south, and Istanbul districts of Pendik to the south, Çekmeköy to the southwest, and Beykoz to the west. The popular resort town Ağva is also a part of Şile. However, between June and September, the population rapidly increases because of the many residents of Istanbul who have summer houses in Şile.

== History ==
The word şile means marjoram in Turkish. The word's etymology is said to be Greek. In the Byzantine period, Şile was known as Chele (Greek: Χηλή), a fortified harbor town on the Black Sea coast of Bithynia. The Greek name may derive from khēlē (χηλή), (Also spelled Xêlai or Xêlaita), meaning "claw" or metaphorically (“small breakwater” / “little claw-shaped harbor”).

There has been a fishing village here since 700 BC and a lighthouse since the Ottoman period. According to the Ottoman General Census of 1881/82-1893, the kaza of Şile had a total population of 16.770, consisting of 10.314 Muslims, 6.447 Greeks, 3 Armenians and 6 foreign citizens. The boundaries of Şile were expanded by the addition of the village of Esenceli from Beykoz district in 1989.

== Composition ==
There are 62 neighbourhoods in Şile District:

- Ağaçdere
- Ağva Merkez
- Ahmetli
- Akçakese
- Alacalı
- Avcıkoru
- Balibey
- Bıçkıdere
- Bozgoca
- Bucaklı
- Çataklı
- Çavuş
- Çayırbaşı
- Çelebi
- Çengilli
- Darlık
- Değirmençayırı
- Doğancılı
- Erenler
- Esenceli
- Geredeli
- Göçe
- Gökmaşlı
- Göksu
- Hacı Kasım
- Hacıllı
- Hasanlı
- İmrendere
- İmrenli
- İsaköy
- Kabakoz
- Kadıköy
- Kalem
- Karabeyli
- Karacaköy
- Karakiraz
- Karamandere
- Kervansaray
- Kızılca
- Kömürlük
- Korucu
- Kumbaba
- Kurfallı
- Kurna
- Meşrutiyet
- Oruçoğlu
- Osmanköy
- Ovacık
- Sahilköy
- Satmazlı
- Sofular
- Soğullu
- Sortullu
- Şuayipli
- Teke
- Ulupelit
- Üvezli
- Yaka
- Yaylalı
- Yazımanayır
- Yeniköy
- Yeşilvadi

== Features ==
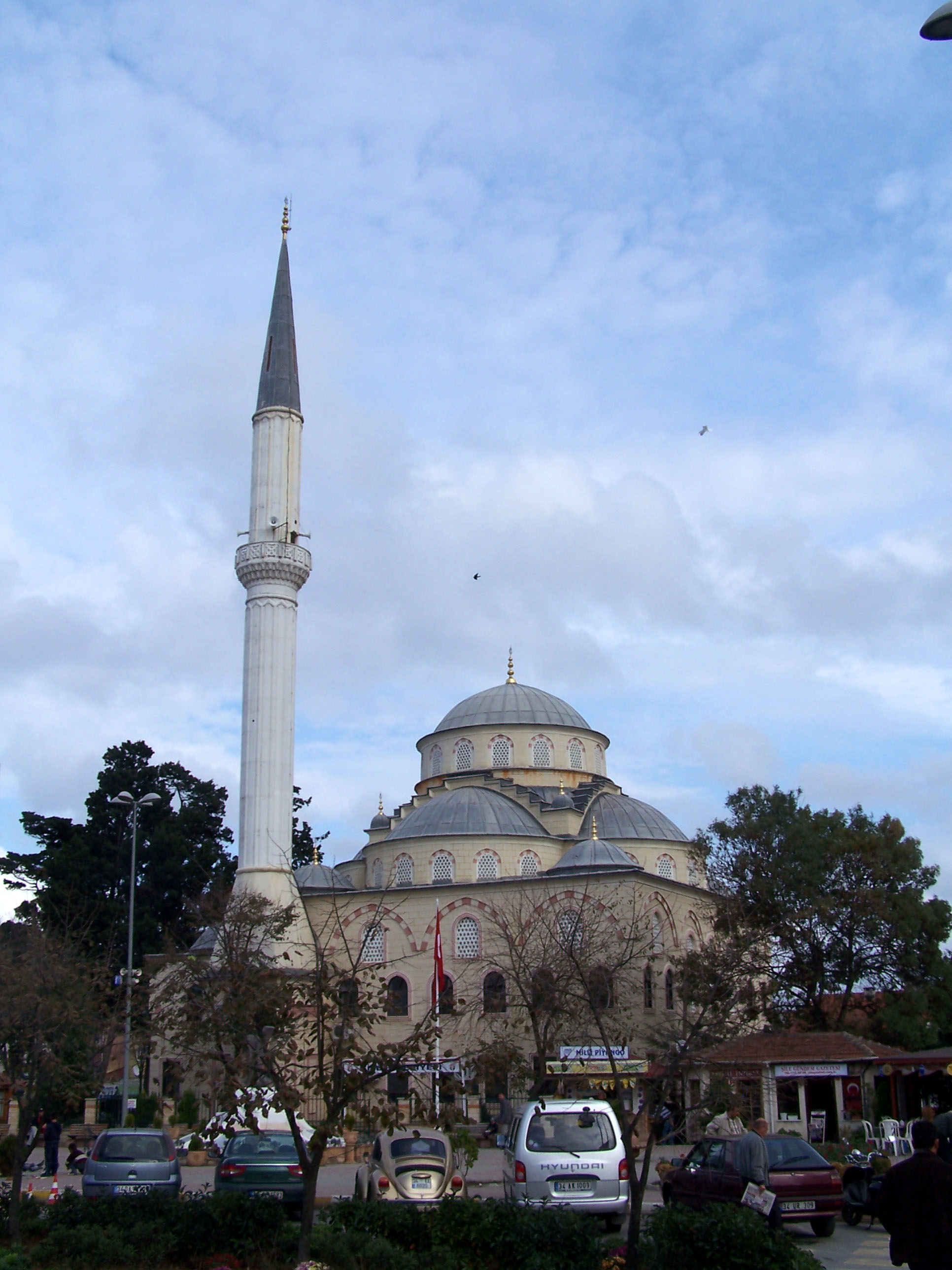
Hüseyin Keçici Mosque

Şile is famous for its beaches. However, it is at the northernmost point of Istanbul and thus shares the same sea conditions as other Black Sea towns where strong sea undercurrents can be dangerous to inexperienced swimmers. Beachgoers drown here annually on a regular basis. The north-facing Black Sea has a much shorter holiday season than the Aegean, the Mediterranean or even the Marmara, due to the relatively colder winters. Şile Castle (Turkish: Şile Kalesi) is a 14th-century Genoese castle on an island in Şile. The castle was renovated in 2015, sparking criticism that the work had made it resemble the cartoon character SpongeBob SquarePants or an illustration from the video game Minecraft. The tomb of a Muslim saint, Kum Baba, is on a tree-covered hill above Şile. Along the coast near Şile, in the village of Kızılcaköy, is a cave which, according to a local myth, is said to be the scene of events in the Anabasis of Xenophon. Şile is also known for Şile cloth, a crimped-looking, light, see-through cotton fabric, made on the Şile coast, sold in many shops in the town and sent to the bazaars of Istanbul. A fair is held in the town to promote Şile cloth every summer. The largest campus of Işık University is located in Şile.

== Transport ==
Şile is a part of Istanbul public transport system (İETT). There is a bus from Harem via Üsküdar (located at the Anatolian side of Istanbul) to Şile (İETT Lines 139 and 139A).

== Climate ==
Şile's climate is humid subtropical according to the Köppen and Trewartha climate classification, though until recently, the town was in the oceanic zone. Şile's climate is marked by high humidity. It is in plant hardiness zone 8b, and AHS heat zone 2.

Climate data for Şile, Istanbul
Month	Jan	Feb	Mar	Apr	May	Jun	Jul	Aug	Sep	Oct	Nov	Dec	Year
Mean daily maximum °C (°F)	9.2 (48.6)	9.8 (49.6)	12.1 (53.8)	15.9 (60.6)	20.6 (69.1)	25.3 (77.5)	27.7 (81.9)	27.9 (82.2)	24.6 (76.3)	19.9 (67.8)	15.3 (59.5)	11.0 (51.8)	18.3 (64.9)
Daily mean °C (°F)	5.8 (42.4)	6.0 (42.8)	7.9 (46.2)	11.3 (52.3)	16.0 (60.8)	20.7 (69.3)	23.3 (73.9)	23.8 (74.8)	20.1 (68.2)	15.9 (60.6)	11.4 (52.5)	7.6 (45.7)	14.2 (57.5)
Mean daily minimum °C (°F)	2.9 (37.2)	2.9 (37.2)	4.4 (39.9)	7.5 (45.5)	12.0 (53.6)	16.1 (61.0)	18.9 (66.0)	19.8 (67.6)	16.1 (61.0)	12.5 (54.5)	8.1 (46.6)	4.7 (40.5)	10.5 (50.9)
Average precipitation mm (inches)	87.5 (3.44)	73.7 (2.90)	70.3 (2.77)	45.5 (1.79)	32.3 (1.27)	39.7 (1.56)	37.6 (1.48)	62.5 (2.46)	79.3 (3.12)	110.2 (4.34)	85.3 (3.36)	117.0 (4.61)	840.9 (33.1)
Average precipitation days (≥ 0.1 mm)	18.8	15.3	13.7	12.4	11.6	9.2	5.0	6.7	7.9	12.5	16.8	20.2	150.1
Average snowy days (≥ 0.1 cm)	4.3	4.4	0.5	0.0	0.0	0.0	0.0	0.0	0.0	0.0	0.1	2.6	11.9
Average relative humidity (%)	81.0	80.2	78.0	78.4	81.2	80.9	80.9	80.6	79.1	81.7	80.9	80.8	80.3

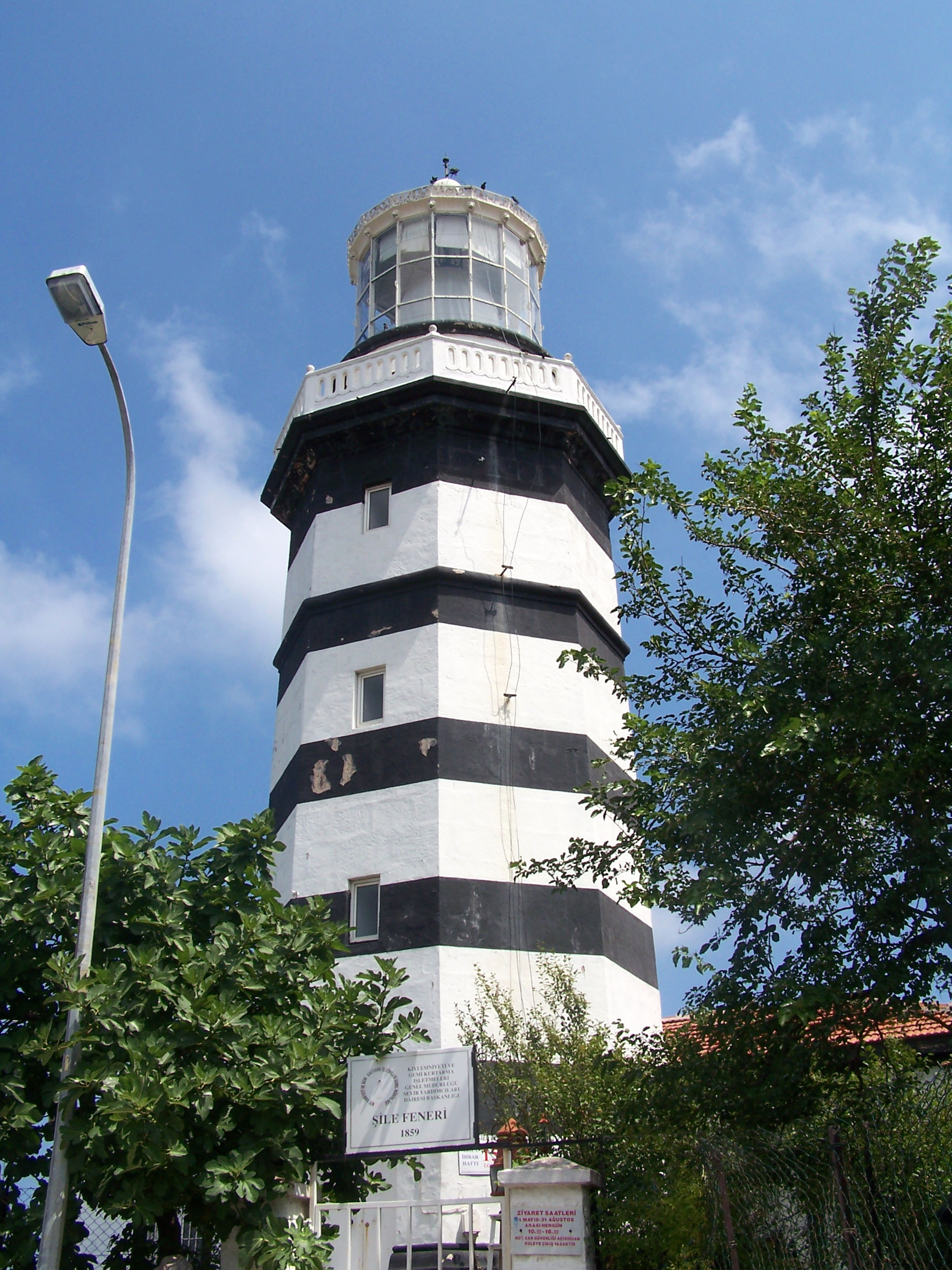
Historic lighthouse Şile Feneri

== Twin towns – sister cities ==
Şile is twinned with:

- Idstein, Germany
- Barcaldin, Australia
- Cazin, Bosnia and Herzegovina
