= Akbank Sanat =

Contemporary art center in Turkey

Coordinates: 41.0360°N 28.9831°E

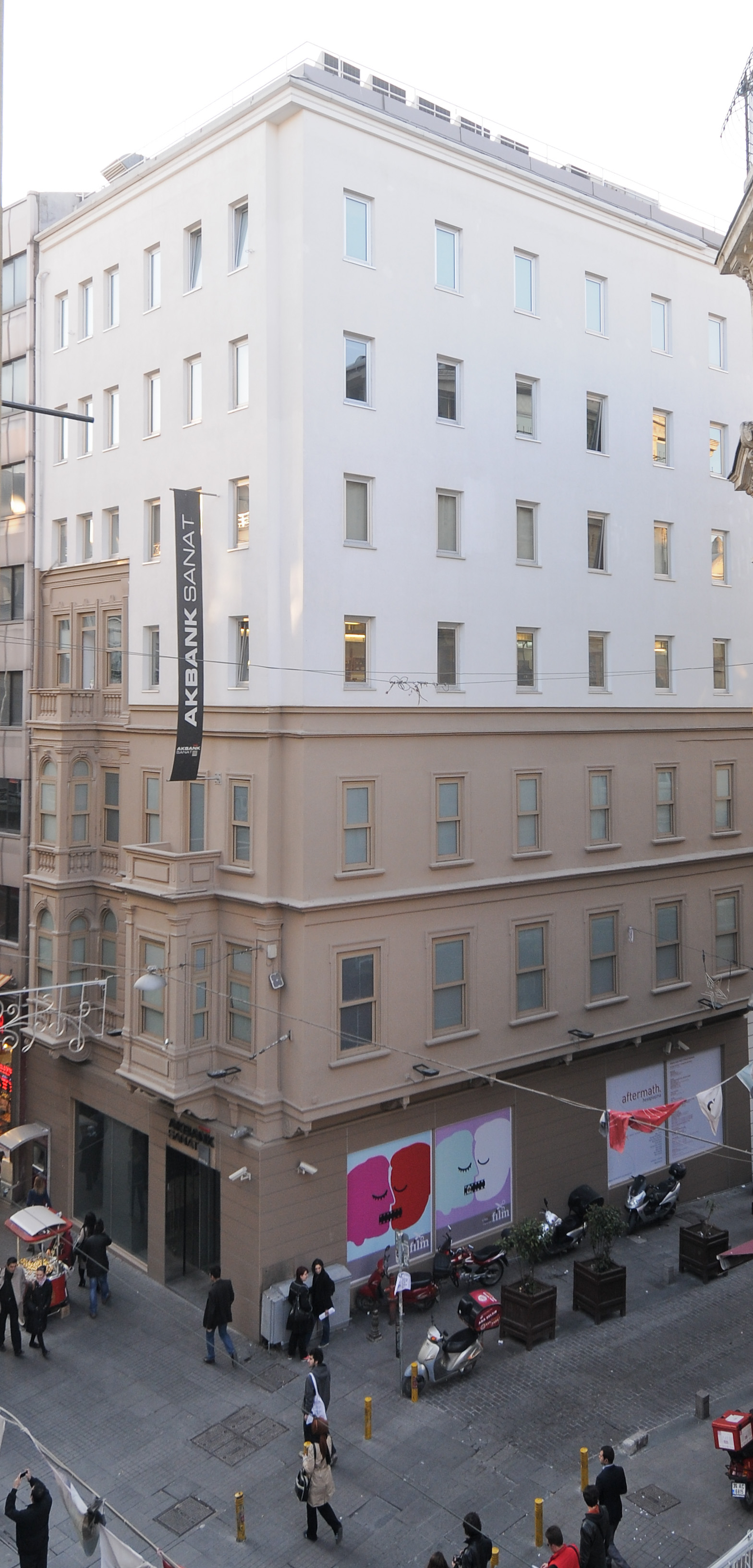

Akbank Sanat is an art center founded by the Turkish bank Akbank in 1993. The art center is located in Beyoğlu, Istanbul and organizes over 700 events every year. The Center supports the development of contemporary arts in Turkey and hosts many international projects in different artistic fields, giving special attention to empowering young artists by creating opportunities for their artistic development.

== The Center and Its Events ==
Akbank Sanat, which is located on Istiklal Avenue in the heartland of Istanbul, is composed of six floors. The gallery, located on the ground and first floors, has hosted 200 contemporary and digital art exhibitions to date. The second floor has a conference hall which can host 125 people. The Akbank Short Film Festival screenings, concerts, plays performed by the Akbank Children's Theatre, conferences, and talks are regularly showcased in the hall. On the third floor is a printmaking studio and workshop for visual artists. A library and a cafeteria are located on the fourth floor, and the sixth floor is utilized as a Contemporary Dance studio where open rehearsals, workshops coordinated by guest choreographers, dance classes for adults and children, and technical lectures given by local/international professionals.

== Exhibitions ==
The Akbank Sanat Gallery features prominent contemporary and digital artists worldwide. The gallery is dedicated to supporting up-and-coming artists. Every year, Akbank Sanat, in partnership with the Painting and Sculpture Museums Association, hosts the Akbank Contemporary Artists Award Exhibition. The exhibition aims to foster the development of contemporary art and showcase the pieces of talented young artists selected through jury evaluations. Akbank Sanat is the main sponsor of the Contemporary Istanbul Art Fair, which was organized in 2023 for the 18th time.

Akbank Sanat Exhibitions in chronological order:

- 13 September 2024 - 2 February 2025, Georg Baselitz: The Last Decade, with Sakıp Sabancı Museum
- 5 June - 31 July 2024 Akbank 42nd Contemporary Artists Prize Exhibition
- 26 March - 18 May 2024, Now in Digital Art: Game Room
- 7 February – 9 March 2024, Intentions 2: “Curating Contemporary Art” Seminar Program
- 6 December 2023 - 20 January 2024, A Space of Insight: Akbank Sanat and 30 Years
- 14 September - 11 November 2023, Akbank 41st Contemporary Artists Prize Exhibition
- 11 May - 29 July 2023, Prizma Expanded: Poetics of Perception
- 7 December 2022 - 19 April 2023, Digital Serendipity
- 10 September – 19 November 2022, The Room With Forty Doors: The 40th Anniversary Of The Contemporary Artists Exhibitions
- 1 June - 30 July 2022, Akbank 40th Contemporary Artists Prize Exhibition
- 1 March - 7 May 2022, Now in Digital Art: Alternate Realities + NFT
- 7 December 2021 - 12 February 2022, Chosen Ignorance
- 21 September - 20 November 2021, Akbank 39th Contemporary Artists Prize Exhibition
- 9 March - 15 June 2021, Dystopia Sound Art
- 23 December 2020 - 13 February 2021, 6 Artists In Search Of A Precedent
- 31 January - 26 April 2020, Marina Abramović + MAI: Flux, with Sakıp Sabancı Museum
- 15 October - 21 November 2020, Akbank 38th Contemporary Artists Prize Exhibition
- 20 November 2019 - 11 January 2020, Regular Insanity
- 10 September - 31 October 2019, Self/Trans-lation: Sudarshan Shetty
- 28 June - 31 July 2019, Akbank 37th Contemporary Artists Prize Exhibition
- 13 April - 25 May 2019, The New Human Agenda
- 23 January - 9 March 2019, Faces and Places: Theo Eshetu
- 28 November 2018 - 5 January 2019, The Far/o/ther Architecture
- 28 June - 28 July 2018, Akbank 36th Contemporary Artists Prize Exhibition
- 13 January - 10 March 2018, Strange Fruit: Susie MacMurray
- 18 April - 31 May 2018, Remix: Bulent Erkmen
- 9 September - 23 December 2017, Black Noise
- 7 June - 25 July 2017, Find Me Photography Exhibition
- 16 December 2016 - 4 March 2017, NonSpaces
- 12 April - 27 May 2017, Akbank 35th Contemporary Artists Prize Exhibition
- 30 September - 3 December 2016, The Incident of Art / The Art of Incident
- 1 September - 28 November 2015, Louise Bourgeois: Larger Than Life
- 16 December 2015 - 13 February 2016, Monochrome
- 3 June - 31 July 2015, Akbank Contemporary Artist Prize Exhibition 2015
- 11 March - 16 May 2015, Percussive Hunter
- 24 September - 24 November 2014, Words, Things and Concepts: Marcel Broodthaers
- 17 December 2014 - 21 February 2015, Histories of the Post-Digital: 1960s and 1970s Media Art Snapshots
- 19 March - 17 May 2014, This Page Intentionally Left Blank
- 7 November - 7 December 2013, Black, White & Multicolour: Akbank Sanat Print Workshop
- 8 January - 1 March 2014, Autonomous and Beautiful
- 23 May - 31 July 2013, Akbank Contemporary Artists Prize Exhibition 2013
- 20 February - 27 April 2013, The Lives of Others - Repetition and Survival
- 20 November 2012 - 30 January 2013, Magdalena Abakanowicz, The Adventure of the Human Being
- 12 September - 31 October 2012, Allan Sekula: Disassembled Movies 1972-2012
- 14 March - 17 May 2012, Aftermath

== Akbank Short Film Festival ==
Akbank Short Film Festival, is a short film festival organised by Akbank since 2004. The movies that gain a prize from the competition are demonstrated in various cities and universities around Turkey. The festival, held at Akbank Sanat and offering its program free of charge, consists of "Festival Shorts," "World Shorts," "From Short to Feature," "Experiences," "Documentary Film," "Perspective," "Special Screening," and "Forum." Sections. Films from leading film festivals around the world, such as Cannes, Berlin, and Venice, meet with the audience in the festival program.

== Akbank Jazz Festival ==
Akbank Jazz Festival first took place in 1991 as a series of concerts in Istanbul. The festival is a member of the European Jazz Network. The festival takes place in locations such as Haghia Irini Museum, Babylon, Cemal Reşit Rey Konser Salonu, and Zorlu Center PSM.

The festival has hosted musicians such as: *Cecil Taylor, *Archie Shepp, *Roberto Fonseca, *Terje Rypdal, *Miroslav Vitous, *Abdullah Ibrahim, *Aydın Esen, *Dave Holland, *John Zorn, *Cassandra Wilson, *Joachim Kühn, *Joe Zawinul, *Anthony Braxton, *McCoy Tyner, *Joe Lovano, *Courtney Pine, *Pharoah Sanders, *Muhal Richard Abrams, *Roscoe Mitchell, *Arto Lindsay, *Richard Bona, *Max Roach, *Nguyen Le, *Dino Saluzzi, *Jimmy Smith, *Art Ensemble of Chicago
