= Yeşilköy Feneri =

Yeşilköy Feneri Ayostefanos Feneri
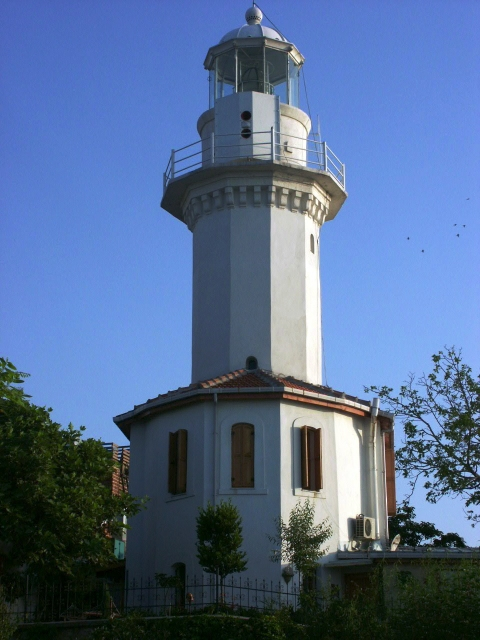
- Location: Yeşilköy; Istanbul; Turkey
- Coordinates: 40°57′30″N 28°50′21″E

Tower
- Constructed: 1856
- Construction: stone tower
- Height: 16 m (52 ft)
- Shape: octagonal prism prism tower centered on the keeper's house
- Markings: white tower
- Fog signal: blast every 30s.

Light
- First lit: 1857
- Focal height: 23 m (75 ft)
- Lens: 500mm catadioptric cylindrical lens
- Intensity: 500 W
- Range: 15 nmi (28 km)
- Characteristic: Fl W 10s.

Yeşilköy Feneri is a historical lighthouse still in use located on the northern coast of Sea of Marmara at Yeşilyurt neighborhood (once part of Yeşilköy) in Istanbul's Bakırköy district, Turkey.

== History ==
Built in 1856, it was initially called Ayostefanos Feneri (Hagios Stefanos Lighthouse) after the suburb's former name.

The lighthouse was commissioned by the Ottoman sultan Abdülmecid I (reigned 1839–1861) in order to provide safe navigation around the shallow waters before the Yeşilköy Point for ships plying the northwestern coast of the Sea of Marmara towards Istanbul. It is situated roughly 14 km (8.7 mi) to the southwest of the southern entrance to the Bosporus.

It was built by French engineers in 1856 in the form of a masonry octagonal prism with two stages. Since the ground at the location is not elevated enough from the sea level, the 16 m (52 ft) tower was constructed on a platform, enabling a focal height of 23 m (75 ft). The structure is painted entirely white. A two-story outbuilding is annexed, that was used as the keeper's living quarters and for administrative purposes. A gallery encircles the tower's lantern room. Atop the tower's cupola, a flag post is erected.

Yeşilköy Lighthouse went in service on January 5, 1857. Initially, it was lit by kerosene, but was later replaced by a Dalén light using carbide (acetylene gas). Nowadays, the light runs on electricity. The lighthouse's lantern has a 500mm catadioptric cylindrical lens and a 500 W light source that flashes every 10 seconds in group. Its white light is visible at a range of 15 nmi (28 km). In foggy conditions, a foghorn sounds every 30 seconds to warn of the hazardous area.

The lighthouse is listed in Turkey under the code "TUR 055" and its radio call sign is TC1YLH. It is maintained by the Coastal Safety Authority (Turkish: Kıyı Emniyeti Genel Müdürlüğü) of the Ministry of Transport and Communication. The lighthouse underwent restoration in the years 1945, 1971 and 1988.

The outbuilding of the lighthouse was converted into a fish and seafood restaurant, which can host 100 guests in the main hall and 40 people in the conservatory. Furthermore, 150 customers can dine on an open-air terrace in the summer months.

== See also ==
- List of lighthouses in Turkey
- Anadolu Feneri
- Rumeli Feneri
- Maiden's Tower
