= Kennedy Avenue =

Roadway in Istanbul, Turkey

Coordinates: 40.9951°N 28.9309°E

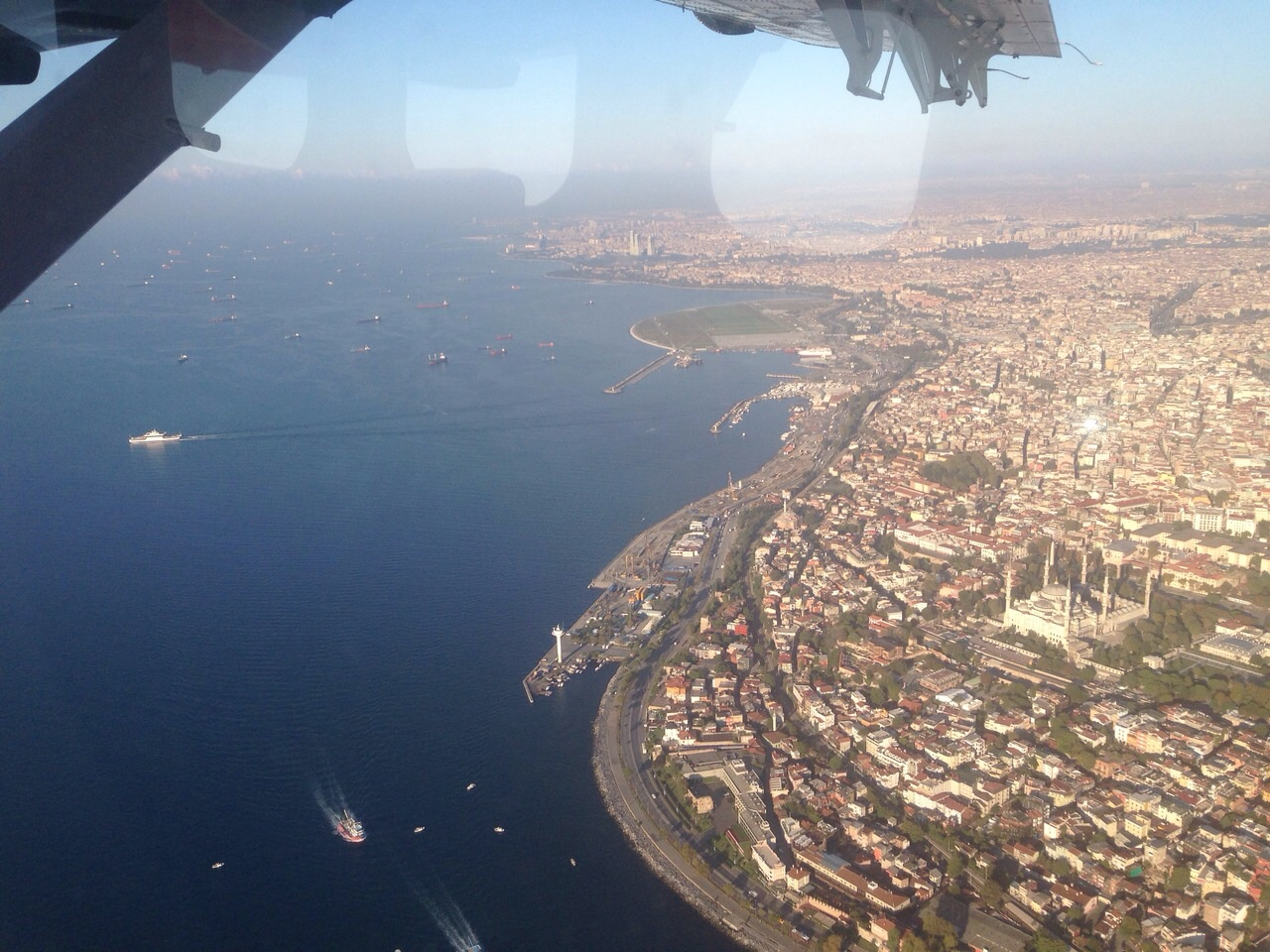
- Length: 13 km (8.1 mi)
- East end: Sirkeci
- West end: Bakirköy - Atatürk Airport

Kennedy Avenue (Turkish: Kennedy Caddesi) is a 13-kilometre-long (8.08 mi) avenue in Istanbul, Turkey that travels southwest from Sirkeci district to Bakırköy District and most importantly to the Atatürk Airport. The avenue is named for the 35th U.S. President, John F. Kennedy.

== Route ==
The course of the road roughly follows the old Sea Walls of the city. After starting next to Sirkeci station in central Istanbul, Kennedy Avenue runs eastwards along the south side of the Golden Horn near its mouth. The road then turns south at Sarayburnu and winds its way along the east side of the centre of Istanbul, between the Topkapi Palace and the Strait of Bosphorous. After passing the Ahırkapı Feneri lighthouse and running near the Hagia Sophia Mosque and the Boukoleon Palace, the road swings westwards towards west Istanbul and the airport, passing Little Hagia Sophia, the headquarters of the Armenian Patriarchate of Constantinople and the large harbour in Yenikapi. It then continues west and southwest before terminating at the Ataköy Marina, a short distance from Istanbul's airport. The remainder of the road leading to the airport is known as Rauf Orbay Avenue (Rauf Orbay Caddesi), after the Turkish naval officer Rauf Orbay.

== Places of interest ==
The Ahırkapı Lighthouse, a historical lighthouse still in use, is located in Cankurtaran neighborhood close to the Cankurtaran railway station, which was previously served by the İstanbul-Halkalı Line and now by the T6 light metro.

== See also ==
- List of memorials to John F. Kennedy
