= List of lighthouses in Turkey =

This is an incomplete list of lighthouses in Turkey. As of 2011, there were a total of 445 lighthouses and light vessels in service on Turkey's coastline, which has a total length of 8,333 km (5,178 mi).

== Aegean Sea ==
- Babakale Feneri, Çanakkale Province|
- Datça Feneri, Muğla Province
- Knidos Deveboynu Feneri, Muğla Province
- Kuşadası Feneri, Aydın Province
- Sarpıncık Feneri, İzmir Province

== Black Sea ==
- Anadolu Feneri, Istanbul Province
- İnceburun Lighthouse, Sinop Province
- İnebolu Feneri, Kastamonu Province
- Gerze Feneri, Sinop Province
- İğneada Feneri, Kırklareli Province
- Kefken Adası Feneri, Kocaeli Province
- Kerempe Feneri, Kastamonu Province
- Rumeli Feneri, Istanbul Province
- Şile Feneri, Istanbul Province

== Mediterranean Sea ==
- Gelidonya Feneri, Antalya Province
- Hıdırlık Tower, Antalya
- İskenderun Feneri, Hatay Province
- Kemer Feneri, Antalya Province
- Kızılada Lighthouse, Kızılada, Fethiye, Muğla Province
- Mersin Feneri, Mersin Province

== Sea of Marmara ==
- Ahırkapı Feneri, Istanbul
- Fenerbahçe Feneri, Istanbul
- Hoşköy Hora Feneri, Tekirdağ Province
- Kadıköy İnciburnu Feneri, Istanbul
- Maiden's Tower, Istanbul
- Yeşilköy Feneri, Istanbul

== See also ==
- Lists of lighthouses and lightvessels
