= Şile Lighthouse =

Şile Feneri Şile Burnu
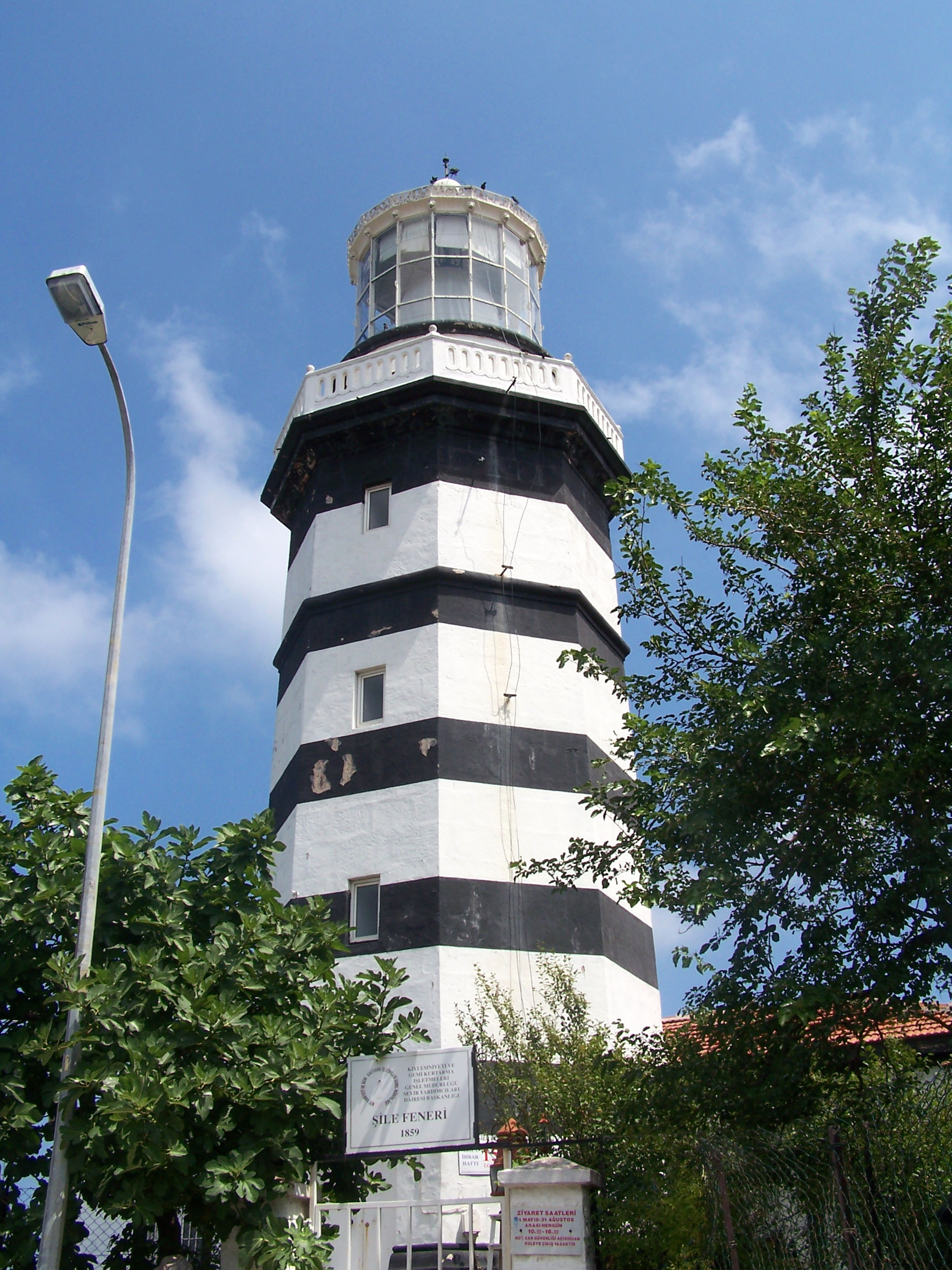
- Location: Şile; Istanbul Province; Turkey
- Coordinates: 41°10′40.7″N 29°36′59.4″E

Tower
- Constructed: 1859
- Construction: stone tower
- Height: 19 m (62 ft)
- Shape: octagonal tower with balcony and lantern attached to 1-storey keeper's house
- Markings: white with narrow black bands tower
- Operator: Directorate General of Coastal Safety

Light
- First lit: 1860
- Focal height: 60 m (200 ft)
- Lens: 8x 925mm catadioptric cylindrical lenses
- Intensity: 1,000 W
- Range: 20 nmi (37 km)
- Characteristic: LFl W 15s.

The Şile Feneri, a historical lighthouse still in use, is located on the western Black Sea coast in the northeast town Şile of Istanbul Province, Turkey.

== History ==
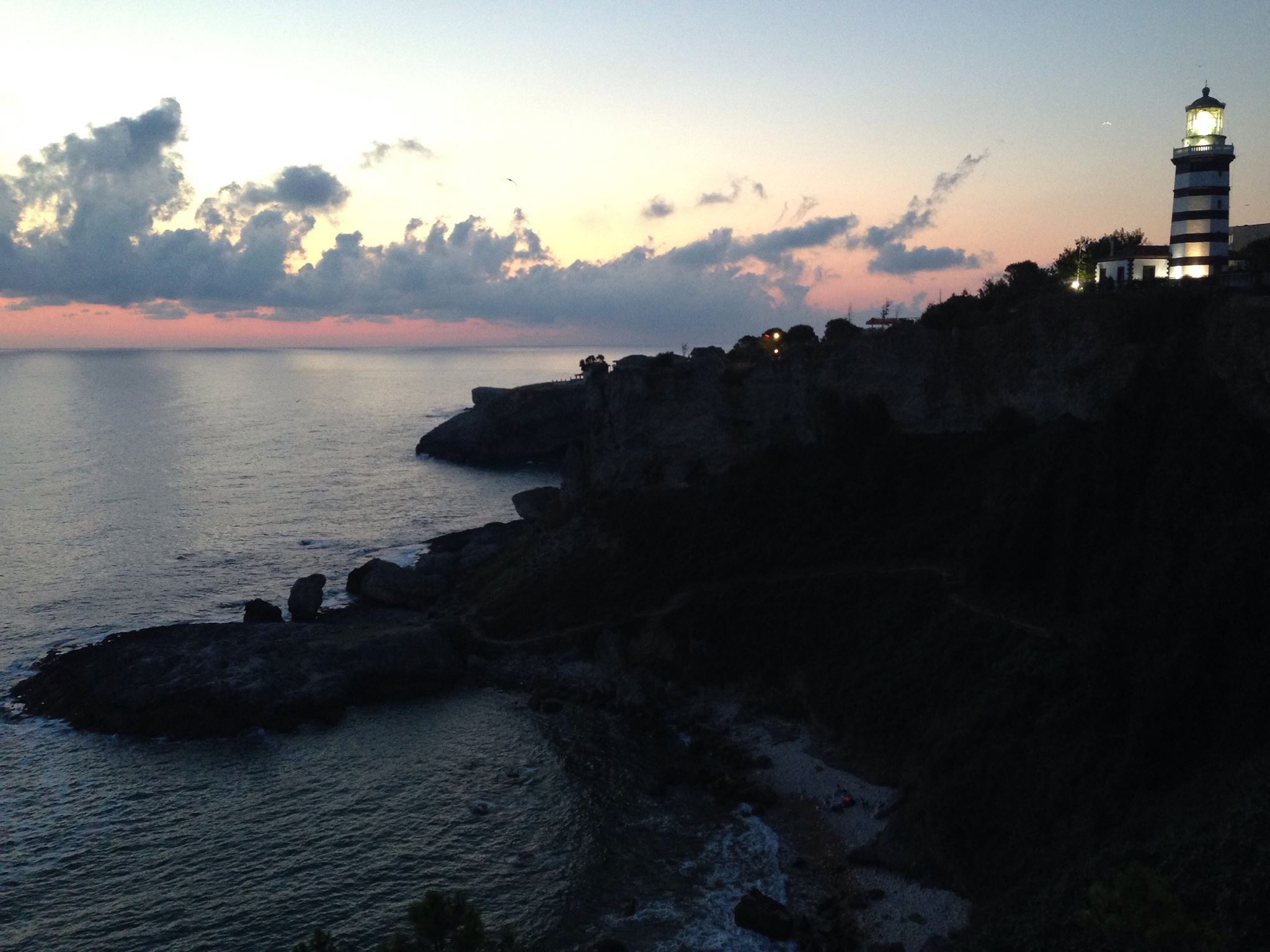
View of the Şile Feneri at dawn

Commissioned by the Ottoman sultan Abdülmecid I (r. 1839–1861), it was constructed in 1859 by French engineers. In 1860, the lighthouse went into service.

The masonry lighthouse is built on a cliffy point at Cape Şile about 1 km (0.62 mi) northeast of the town. The 19 m (62 ft) tower with a gallery around the lantern room has the form of an octagonal prism. A masonry one-story keeper's house is attached to it. The lighthouse is painted white with narrow black horizontal bands.

Initially, the lighthouse was lit by kerosene, however the light source was later replaced by Dalén light using carbide (acetylene gas). Since 1968, it runs on electricity. The lighthouse's lantern has eight 925mm catadioptric cylindrical lenses and a 1,000 W light source. At a focal height of 60 m (200 ft), it flashes white for 1.5s every 15 seconds, which is visible at a range of 20 nmi (37 km). The flashing is achieved by eight rotating panels that are still set in motion by a weight-driven mechanism inside the tower using anchor escapement. The falling weight on the chain reaches the bottom of the tower in two hours. For the operation's continuity, the lighthouse keeper has to pull it up by rewinding the chain.

The lighthouse is listed in Turkey under the code "TUR-046" and its radio call sign is TC2SLH. It is operated and maintained by the Coastal Safety Authority (Turkish: Kıyı Emniyeti Genel Müdürlüğü) of the Ministry of Transport and Communication.

Şile Feneri is open to the public, as a historical site.

== 150th anniversary ==
2010 was the 150th anniversary of the inauguration of the lighthouse. For this purpose, celebrations were held from May 25 to July 23, organized by the local municipality. The Turkish Post issued on May 1, 2010, a commemorative stamp. On July 24, the tower got dressed up from top to bottom in the renowned Şile cloth, a very light cotton fabric woven there.

== See also ==
- List of lighthouses in Turkey
