= Cankurtaran railway station =

Closed railway station in Istanbul, Turkey

CANKURTARAN

General information
- Location: Şadırvan Sk., Cankurtaran Mah. 34122; Fatih/Istanbul; Turkey
- Coordinates: 41.0055°N 28.9829°E
- Owner: Turkish State Railways
- Operator: TCDD Taşımacılık
- Line: Istanbul-Pythion railway
- Platforms: 1 side platform
- Tracks: 1
- Connections: İETT Bus: BN1

Construction
- Structure type: At-grade
- Parking: No
- Cycle facilities: Yes
- Accessible: Yes

History
- Opened: 4 December 1955; 70 years ago
- Closed: 2013–2024
- Rebuilt: 4 December 1955; 70 years ago 26 February 2024; 2 years ago
- Electrified: 4 December 1955 (25 kV AC)

Services
| Preceding station | TCDD Taşımacılık | Following station |
|---|---|---|
| Kumkapı towards Kazlıçeşme | T6 | Sirkeci Terminus |
Former services
| Preceding station | Turkish State Railways | Following station |
|---|---|---|
| Kumkapı towards Halkalı | Istanbul suburban | Sirkeci Terminus |
Location

Cankurtaran is a railway station on the Istanbul suburban, in Istanbul, Turkey. It is located in the neighborhood of Cankurtaran in the historic peninsula of İstanbul. The station is located on Şadırvan Street. Cankurtaran is just a block north of Kennedy Boulevard, along with the shoreline and a few blocks south of the Hagia Sophia and the Imperial Gate to the Topkapı Palace. The station was built in 1955 by the Turkish State Railways to be used by commuter trains operating between Sirkeci and Halkalı.

Cankurtaran is located 2.1 km (1.3 mi) from Sirkeci Terminal. Cankurtaran was indefinitely closed in 2013 due to the rehabilitation and construction of the new Marmaray line. The station was rebuilt and reopened on 26 February 2024 as part of the T6 Sirkeci–Kazlıçeşme Tramway Line / U3 Sirkeci–Kazlıçeşme Rail Line.

== Places of interest ==
The Ahırkapı Lighthouse, a historical lighthouse that is still in use, is in walking distance on the Kennedy Avenue at the coast of Marmara Sea.

== Pictures ==
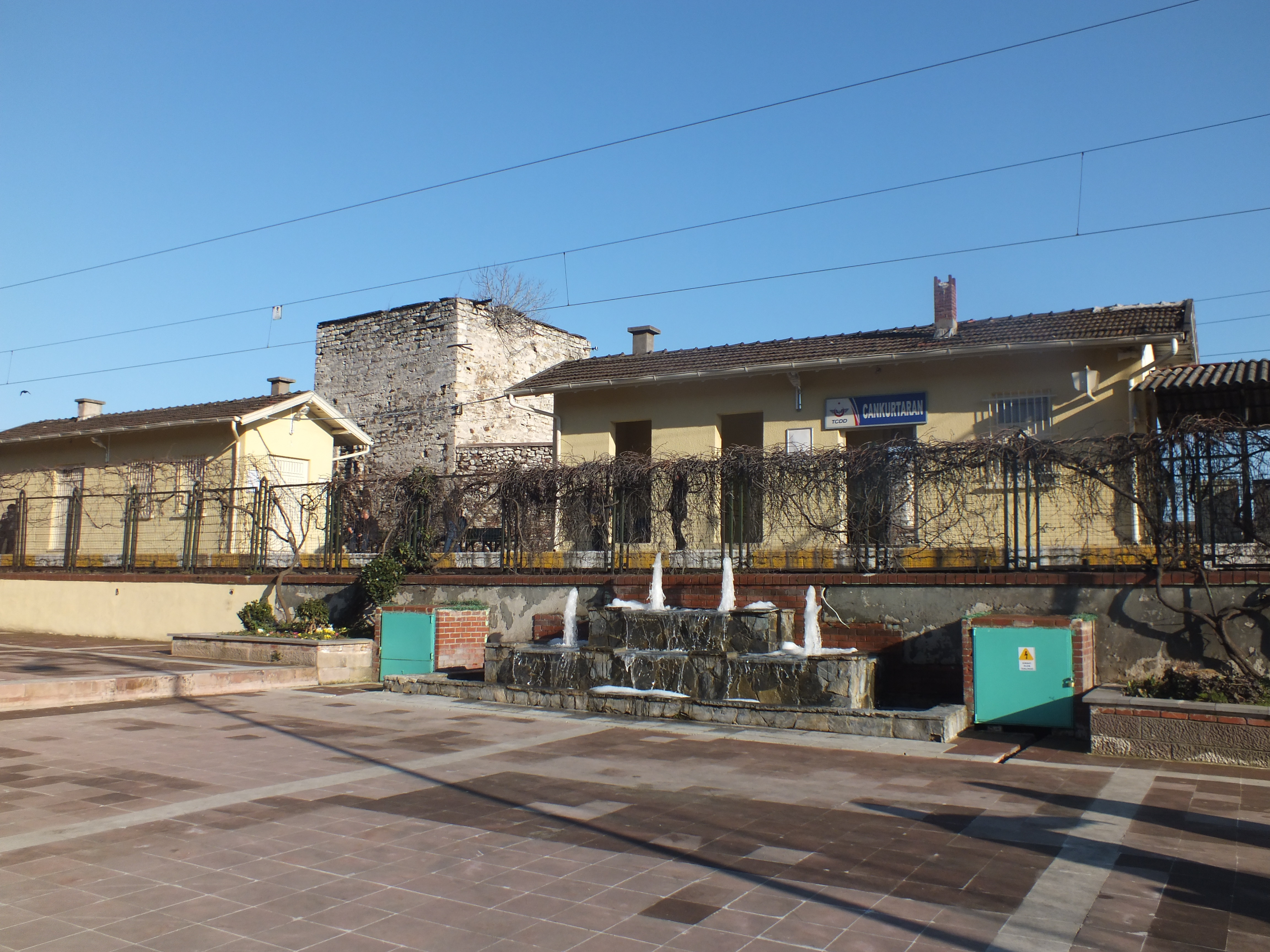
Cankurtaran station before the 2013 closure.
