= Yeşilyurt, Bakırköy =

Neighbourhood of Istanbul, Turkey

Yeşilyurt
- Neighbourhood
- Location within Turkey Location within Istanbul
- Coordinates: 40°57′48″N 28°50′22″E
- Country: Turkey
- Province: Istanbul
- District: Bakırköy
- Population (2022): 8,433
- Time zone: UTC+3 (TRT)

Yeşilyurt (literally "green homeland" in Turkish) is a neighborhood (mahalle) in the municipality and district of Bakırköy, Istanbul Province, Turkey. Its population is 8,433 (2022). It is located along Marmara Sea, and borders to the southwest the neighbourhood of Yeşilköy, which it used to be a part of, and to the northeast that of Ataköy. The population of the quarter is mainly affluent, and lives in low-rise apartment houses.

Yeşilyurt has a station for the Marmaray commuter railway between Gebze and Halkalı. The neighborhood has many smaller parks and green area. The Polat Renaissance Hotel and the Yeşilyurt Sports Club are also located inside Yeşilyurt.

The Yeşilköy Feneri, a lighthouse built in 1856 and still in use, is located at Yeşilköy Point (Turkish: Yeşilköy Burnu). Its outbuilding is being used today as a fish and seafood restaurant.

Yeşilyurt is also home to Istanbul Hava Harp Okulu (Air Force Academy) and to the Air Force Museum.
