= Maiden's Tower =

Tower located on the Champ de Mars in Istanbul, Turkey

The Maiden's Tower
- Kız Kulesi; Πύργος της Κόρης

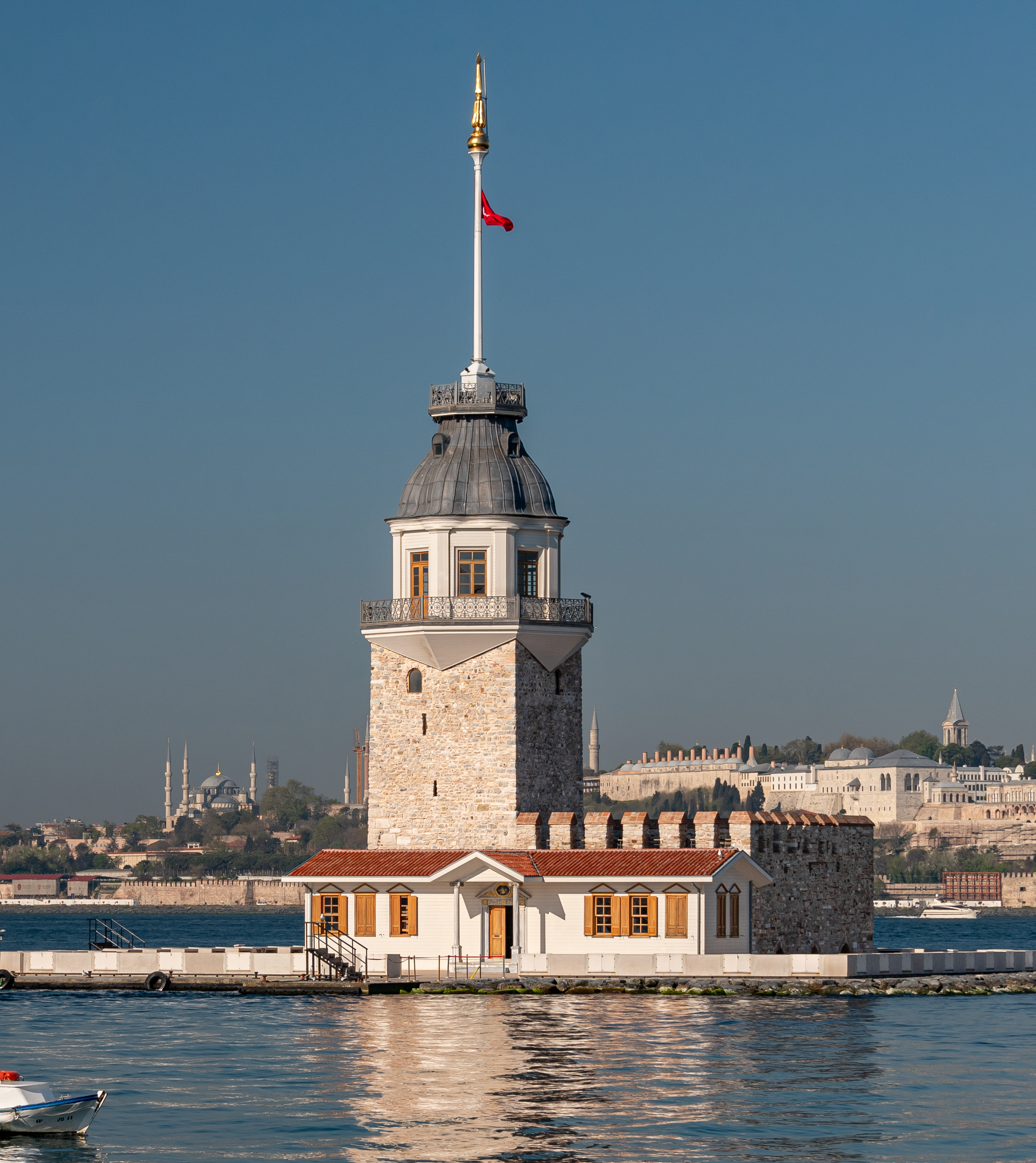
- Seen from Üsküdar
- Interactive map of the The Maiden's Tower area

General information
- Type: Observation tower Broadcasting tower
- Location: Bosporus, Istanbul, Turkey
- Coordinates: 41°01′16.2″N 29°00′15.3″E
- Construction started: 1110
- Completed: 1725
- Opening: 1725
- Owner: Istanbul, Turkey
- Operator: Ministry of Culture and Tourism (Turkey)

Technical details
- Floor count: 5
- Lifts/elevators: 1

Website
- kizkulesi.gov.tr

References
- "Maiden's Tower". Emporis. Archived from the original on 9 October 2021.

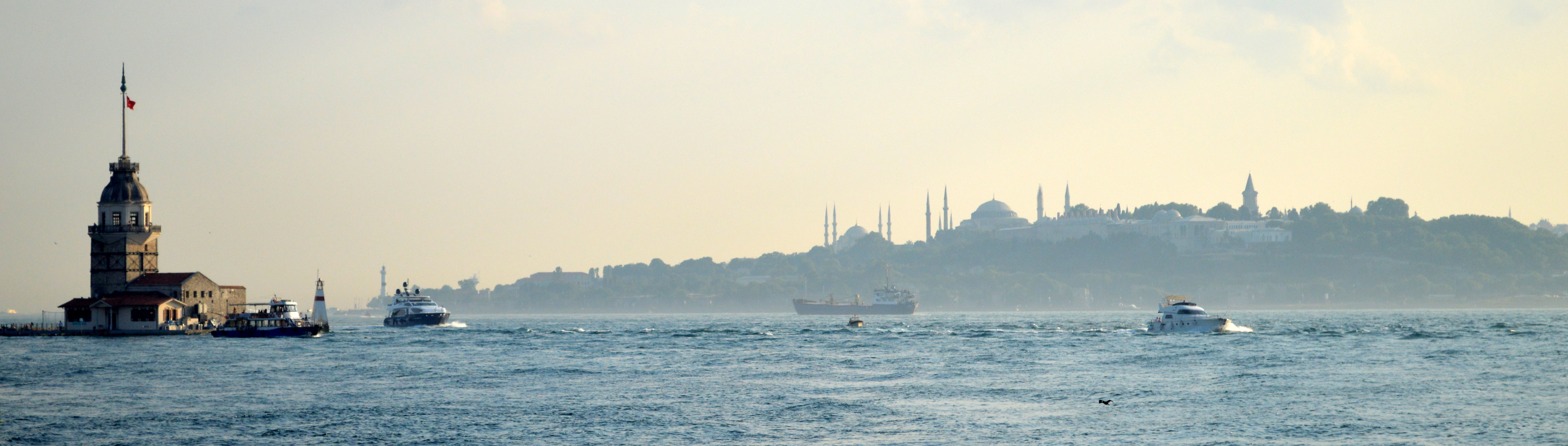
Maiden's Tower and the Seraglio Point

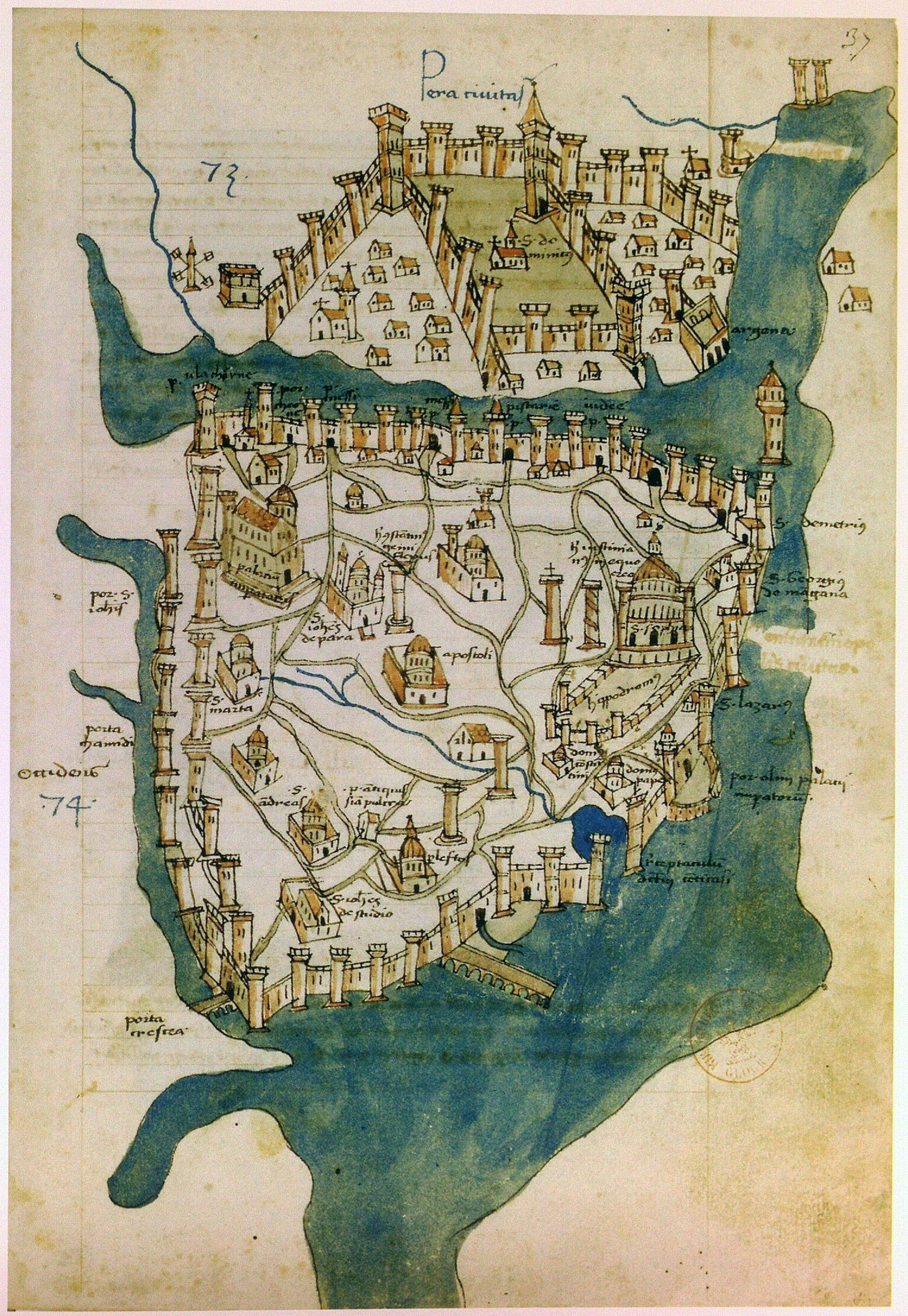
Map of Constantinople (1422) by Florentine cartographer Cristoforo Buondelmonti, showing Pera at the north of the Golden Horn, Constantinople at south, and the Maiden's Tower at right, in the sea, off the coast of Üsküdar on the Asian side of the Bosphorus

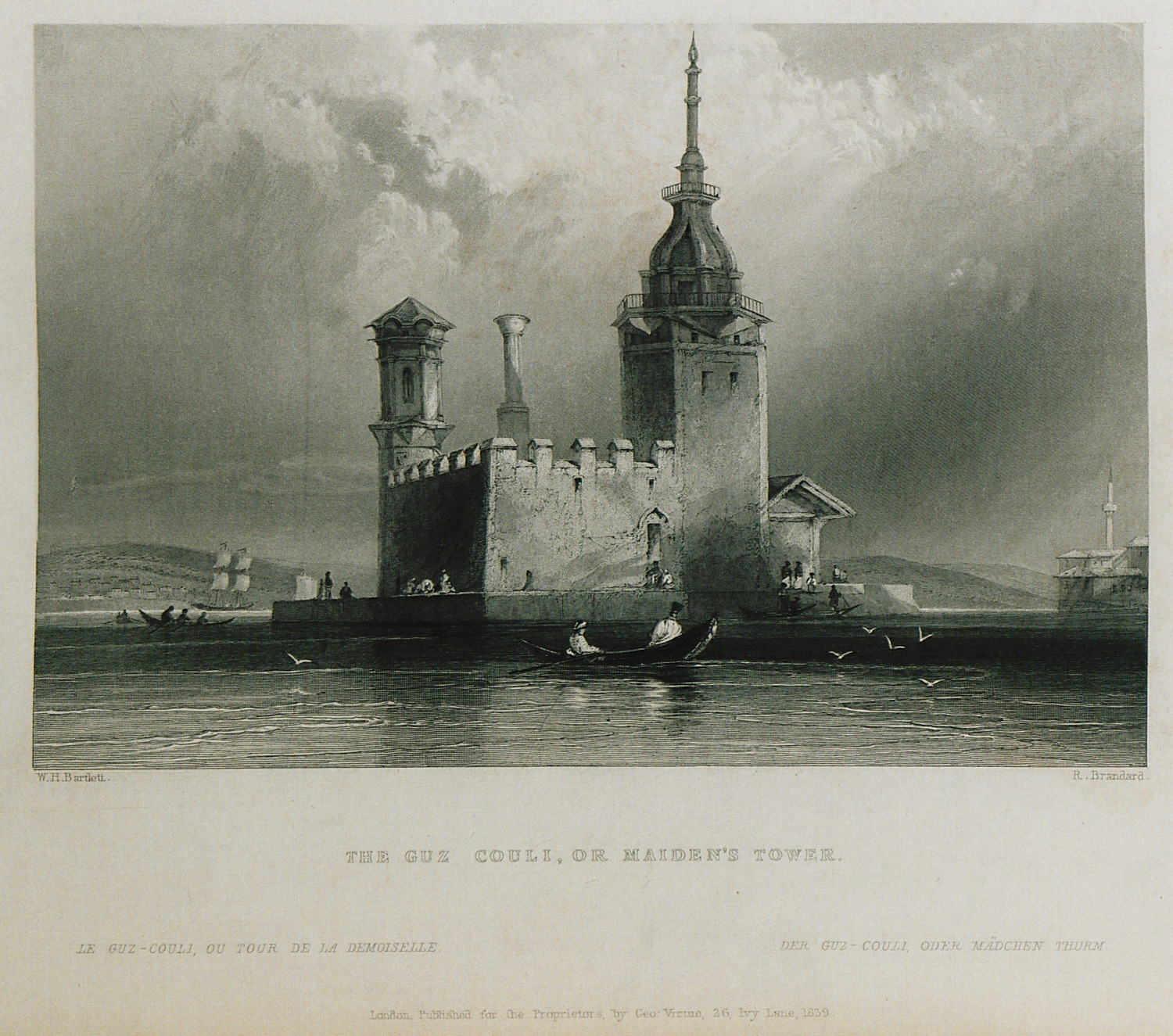
The Guz Couli of Maiden's Tower, Arkla being on the right and Damialis being on the left - Pardoe Julia - 1838

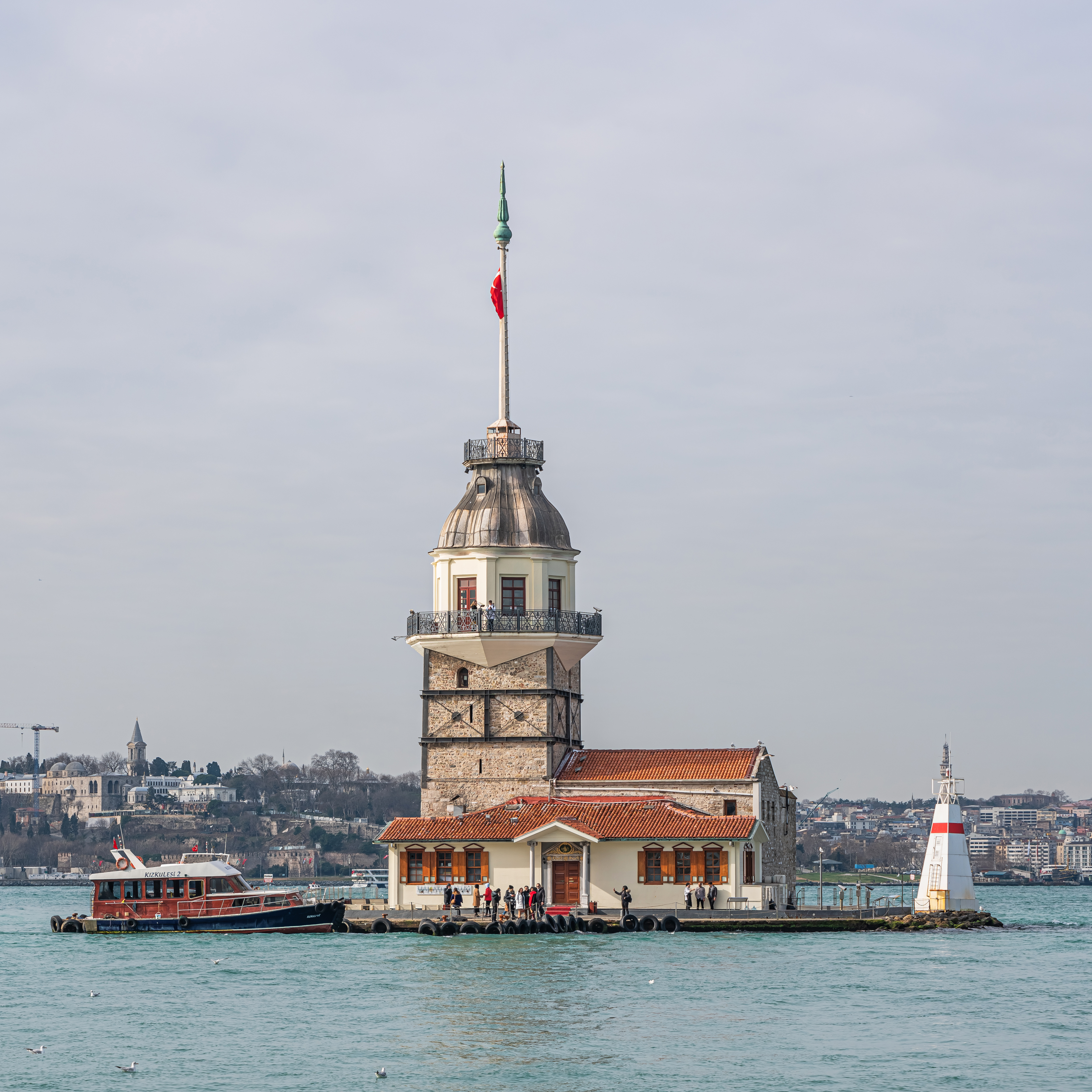
Maiden's Tower before restoration, at the southern entrance of the Bosphorus, with the Seraglio Point in the background

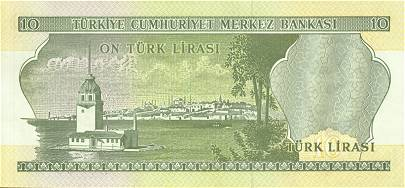
Maiden's Tower on the reverse of the 10 lira banknote (1966–1981)

The Maiden's Tower (Turkish: Kız Kulesi; Greek: Πύργος της Κόρης), also known as Leander's Tower (Greek: Πύργος του Λέανδρου, lit. 'Tower of Leandros') since the Byzantine period, is a tower on a small islet at the southern entrance of the Bosphorus strait, 200 m (220 yd) from the coast of Üsküdar in Istanbul, Turkey.

The tower appeared on the reverse of the Turkish 10 lira banknote from 1966 to 1981.

== History ==
After the naval victory at Cyzicus, in 408 BC the Athenian general Alcibiades probably built a custom station for ships coming from the Black Sea on a small rock called Arcla (small castle) and Damialis (its calf) in front of Chrysopolis (today's Üsküdar).

In 1110 Byzantine Emperor Alexius Comnenus built a wooden tower protected by a stone wall. From the tower an iron chain stretched across to another tower erected on the European shore in the Mangana quarter of Constantinople. The islet was then connected to the Asiatic shore through a defence wall whose underwater remains are still visible. During the Ottoman conquest of Constantinople in 1453, the tower held a Byzantine garrison commanded by the Venetian Gabriele Trevisano. Subsequently, the structure was used as a watchtower by the Ottomans during the reign of sultan Mehmed the Conqueror.

The tower was destroyed during the earthquake of 1509, rebuilt, and then burned down in 1721. Reconstruction was ordered by the grand vizier Damad Ibrahim Pasha and the new building was used as a lighthouse; the surrounding walls were repaired in 1731 and 1734. Then in 1763 the tower was reconstructed in more durable stone. From 1829 it was used as a quarantine station before being restored again by Sultan Mahmud II in 1832. In 1945 it was the turn of the harbour authority to patch it up. Then in 1998 it was restored again, shortly before appearing in the James Bond movie The World Is Not Enough.

After the 17 August 1999 earthquake and tsunami in the Sea of Marmara steel supports were added to the tower to strengthen it. The interior was converted into a café and restaurant, with views of the former Roman, Byzantine and Ottoman capital at Sarayburnu. Private boats ply back and forth between the tower and the shore throughout the day.

Before the intervention of 2020, the Maiden's Tower showed various structural and material pathologies. In 2021 work began on restoring the tower yet again. The work was completed in 2023, and the tower reopened to the public in May of that year. Being surrounded by seawater and being subject to intense humidity and winds, the structure experienced deterioration. The technical report claims that the most serious damage occurred in the load-bearing walls and foundations. The report shows that consolidating the tower's structural system was one of the most important modifications. Stainless steel tie rods were put in unseen areas to reinforce the stone masonry walls, which had been weakened by material fatigue and salt crystallization. Lighter, structurally sound alternatives were used to replace the concrete floors that had been constructed during earlier repairs.

== Origin of the name ==
There are several stories about the tower's name. According to one of them, an oracle prophesied that the emperor's much beloved daughter would be killed by a venomous snake on her eighteenth birthday. To protect her, the emperor had the tower built in the Bosphorus and had her locked up there to keep her away from snakes. Her only regular visitor was her father. On her eighteenth birthday, the emperor brought her a basket of exotic fruits as a gift, delighted that he had been able to thwart the prophecy. However, an asp that had been hiding among the fruit bit the princess who died in her father's arms, just as the oracle had predicted, hence the name Maiden's Tower.

The tower's alternative name, Leander's Tower (Greek: Πύργος του Λέανδρου; French: Tour de Léandros), comes from the Greek myth of Hero and Leander. Hero was a priestess of Aphrodite who lived in a tower at Sestos, at the edge of the Hellespont (Dardanelles). Leander (Leandros), a young man from Abydos on the other side of the strait, fell in love with her and would swim across the Hellespont every night to be with her. Hero would light a lamp at the top of her tower to guide his way. Succumbing to Leander's pleas and to his argument that Aphrodite, the goddess of love, would scorn the worship of a virgin, Hero allowed him to make love to her throughout the warm summer. But one stormy winter night, the waves buffeted Leander as he crossed. The wind blew out Hero's light, and Leander lost his way and was drowned. The grief-stricken Hero threw herself from the tower and died as well. Due to the similarity between the Dardanelles and the Bosphorus, Leander's story somehow came to be attached to the tower too.

== In popular culture ==
- The tower features in a romantic scene in the Turkish TV series Kördüğüm ("Deadlock"), Season 2, Episode 6.
- It also featured in the James Bond film The World Is Not Enough and was visible in the background in the 1963 Bond film From Russia with Love.
- It was also used in the film Hitman.
- It was a point on the American reality game show The Amazing Race 7.
- The tower featured prominenty in the Turkish drama series Kurtlar Vadisi (Valley of the Wolves).
- It appeared in the Turkish drama programme Kırgın Çiçekler.
- It featured in the game Assassin's Creed: Revelations, where the tower is the location of one Masyaf key that the playable character must collect to complete the game.
- The tower featured prominently in the logo for Istanbul's unsuccessful bid for the 2020 Summer Olympics.
- It also featured in the Turkish drama programme Erkenci Kuş ('Early Bird').
- The tower appeared in sixth episode of the Turkish drama series Zengin Kız Fakir Oğlan ('Rich Girl, Poor Boy').
- It also featured in the Turkish drama programme Yasak Elma ('Forbidden Fruit')
- It also appears in the background of the ferry scene in Agatha Christie's 1974 film Murder on the Orient Express
- It is also featured in the music video for Aleyna Tilki’s song Sir
- The tower features in the Historica Arcanum: City of the Crescent book. (A campaign module for DnD 5e) Wherein the tower is home to the largest dungeon in the book.
- The landmark is featured in the Turkish videogame Kabus 22 where it is the location of a major action scene.

== See also ==
- List of lighthouses in Turkey
- List of columns and towers in Istanbul

== Sources ==
- Müller-Wiener, Wolfgang (1977). Bildlexikon zur Topographie Istanbuls: Byzantion, Konstantinupolis, Istanbul bis zum Beginn d. 17 Jh (in German). Tübingen: Wasmuth. ISBN 9783803010223.
