= Kadıköy İnciburnu Lighthouse =

Kadıköy İnciburnu Feneri
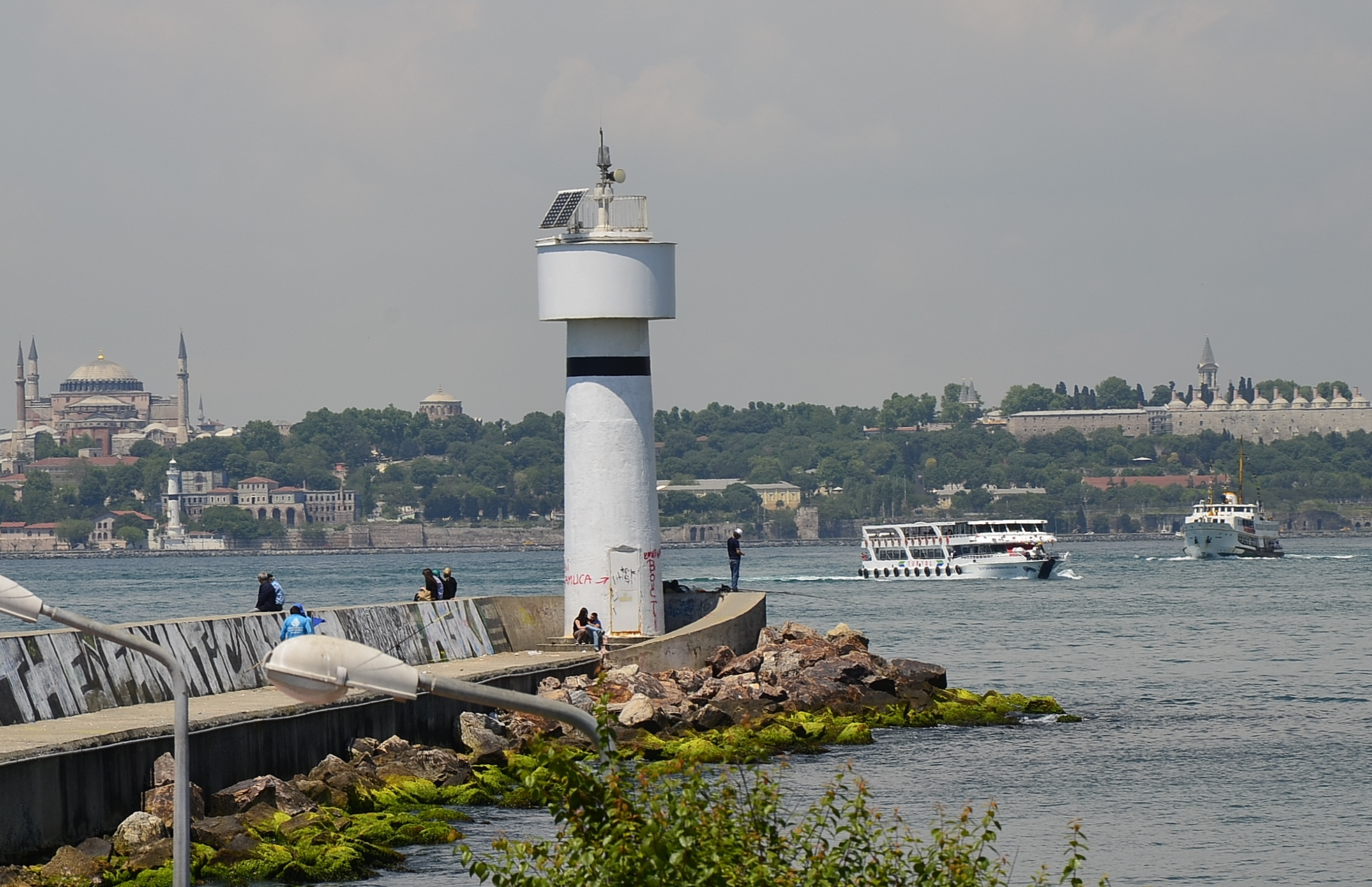
- Location: İnciburnu in Kadıköy, Istanbul, Turkey
- Coordinates: 40°59′33.22″N 29°00′53.57″E

Tower
- Constructed: 1977
- Construction: Concrete
- Height: 11 m (36 ft)
- Shape: Conical
- Markings: White

Light
- Focal height: 14 m (46 ft)
- Lens: 300mm acrylic Fresnel lens
- Intensity: 35 W
- Range: 13 nmi (24 km; 15 mi)
- Characteristic: White flashing every 4 seconds, 2 seconds long

The Kadıköy İnciburnu Feneri (aka Kadıköy Feneri or İnciburnu Feneri) is a lighthouse located at the head of Kadıköy Harbor's İnciburnu Breakwater on the Anatolian coast of Bosporus' south entrance, in Kadıköy district of Istanbul, Turkey. It is across from the Ahırkapı Feneri, which is on the Rumelian coast of the strait at a distance of 1.5 nmi (2.8 km; 1.7 mi). A line connecting the two lighthouses marks the southern boundary of the Port of Istanbul.

The lighthouse with an 11 m (36 ft) high tower is constructed in concrete and painted white. It went on October 13, 1977, in service.

Kadıköy İnciburnu Feneri is equipped with a lantern of type Tideland ML-300 featuring a one-piece acrylic Fresnel lens of 300mm focal length. It is powered by solar energy producing 35 W.

At a focal height of 14 m (46 ft), it flashes white 2 seconds long every 4 seconds, which is visible at a range of 13 nmi (24 km; 15 mi) in the Sea of Marmara.
