= Ahırkapı Lighthouse =

Lighthouse in Turkey

Ahırkapı Feneri
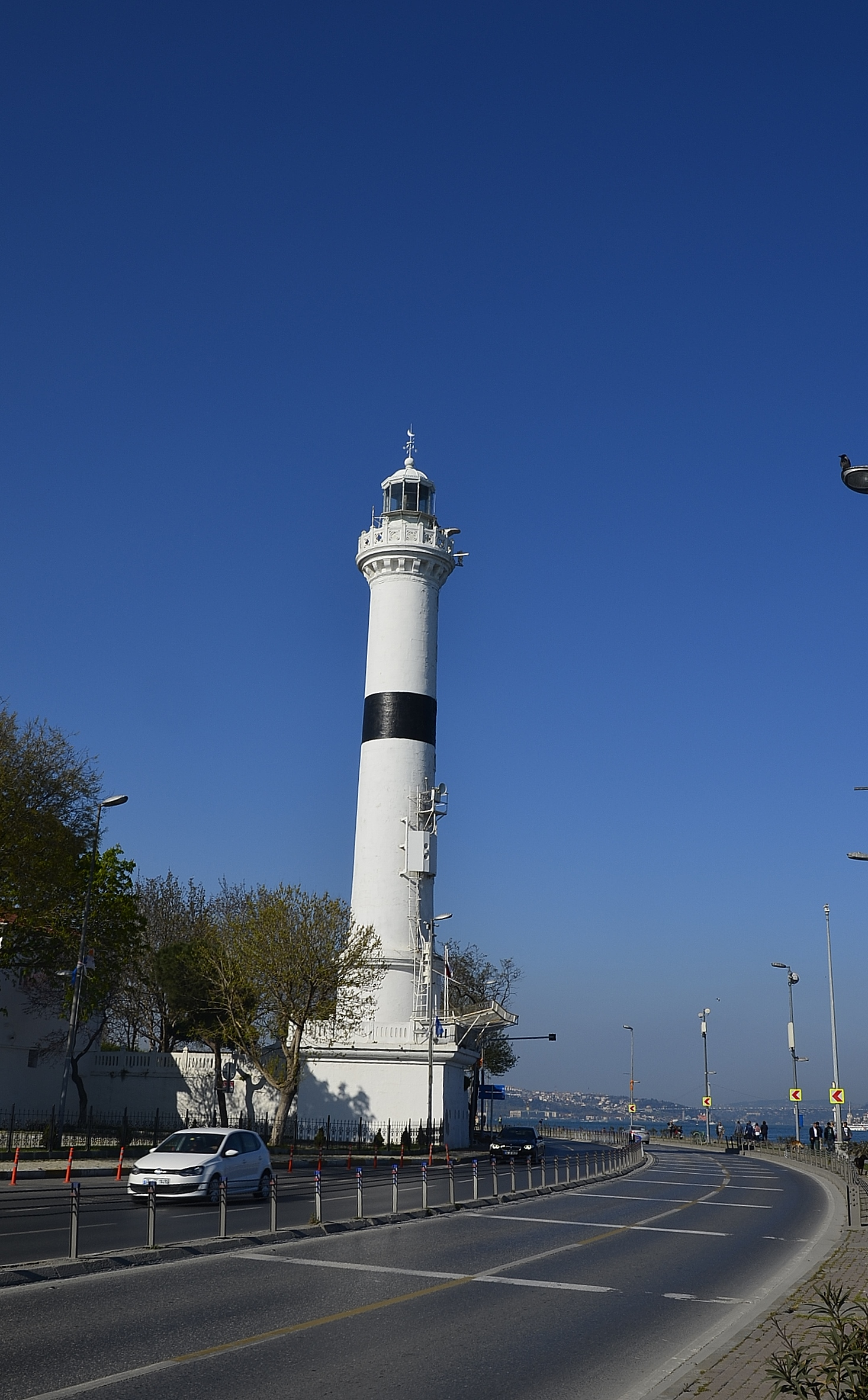
- Ahırkapı Lighthouse seen from Marmara Sea.
- Location: Ahırkapı; Fatih; Istanbul; Turkey
- Coordinates: 41°00′22.79″N 28°59′07.55″E

Tower
- Constructed: 1755 (first)
- Construction: masonry tower
- Height: 26 m (85 ft)
- Shape: tapered cylindrical tower with balcony and lantern
- Markings: white tower with one narrow black horizontal band
- Operator: Directorate General of Coastal Safety

Light
- First lit: 1857 (current)
- Focal height: 36 m (118 ft)
- Lens: 500mm catadioptric cylindrical lenses
- Intensity: 1,000 W
- Range: 16 nmi (30 km)
- Characteristic: Fl W 6s.

The Ahırkapı Feneri, a historical lighthouse still in use, is located at the southern Seraglio Point on the Rumelian coast of Bosporus' south entrance, in Ahırkapı neighborhood of Istanbul's Fatih district, Turkey. It is across from the Kadıköy İnciburnu Feneri, which is on the Anatolian coast of the strait at a distance of 1.5 nmi (2.8 km). A line connecting the two lighthouses marks the southern boundary of the Port of Istanbul.

== History ==
It is told that a marine accident, which occurred near this location, led to the establishment of the lighthouse. In 1755, a merchant sail ship bound for Egypt ran aground off the shore of Kumkapı due to bad weather conditions in the night. Hearing of the ship grounding, Ottoman sultan Osman III (reigned 1754–1757) rushed to the scene, where a seaman complained about the lack of a lighthouse there that could provide safe navigation around the hazardous waters. On the sultan's order, a light fueled by olive oil was established by the Kapudan Pasha atop a watchtower of the city's walls at this location.

== Ahırkapı Lighthouse ==
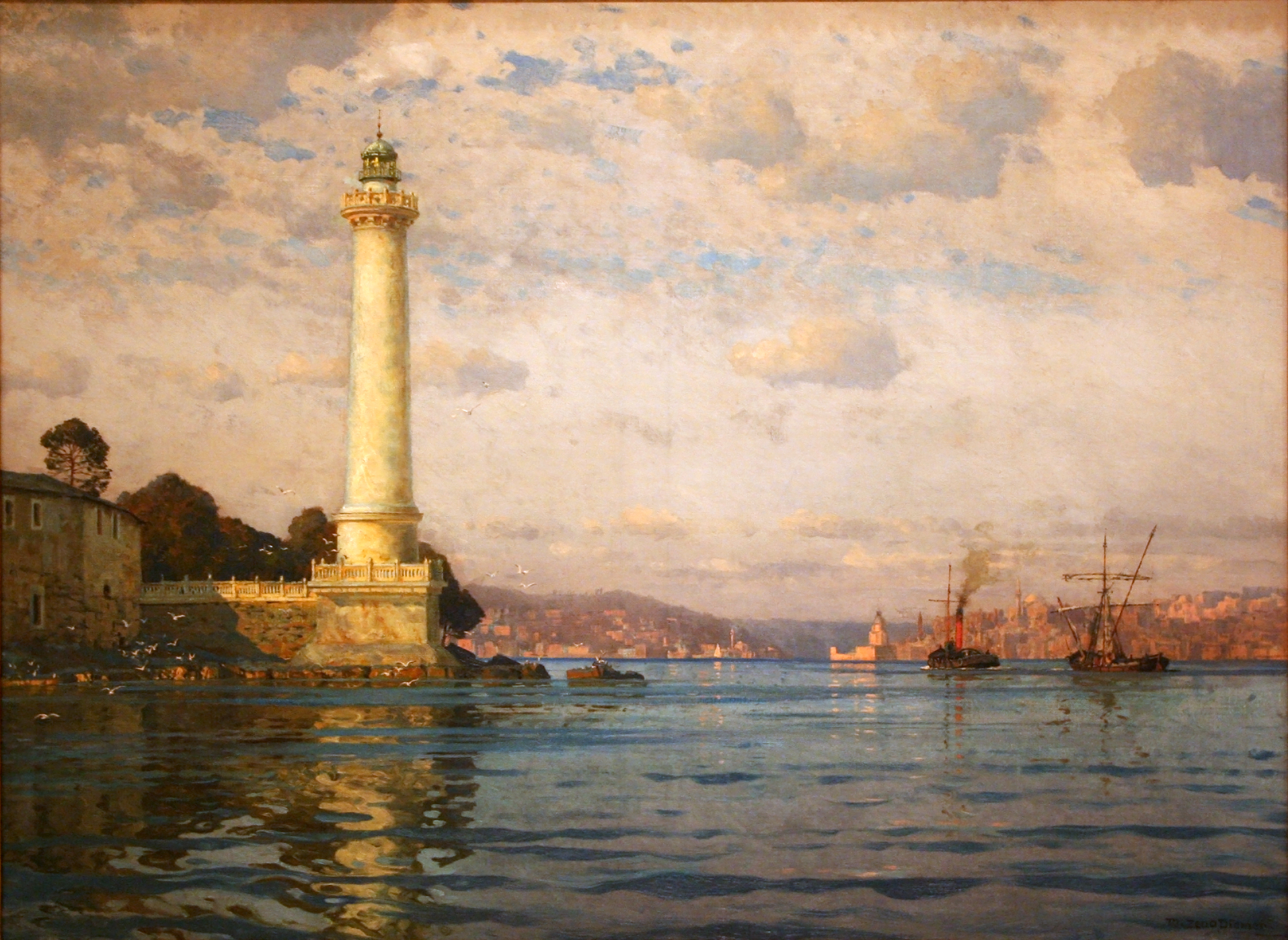
The Ahırkapı Lighthouse by Michael Zeno Diemer (1907)

In 1857, Sultan Abdülmecid I (reigned 1839–1861) commissioned the building of a lighthouse, which was constructed by French engineers in Ahırkapı (literally English: Stable Gate) right outside of the city walls south of the Topkapı Palace.

The masonry lighthouse has a conical shape and is painted white with one narrow black horizontal band. To the 26-metre-high (85 ft) tower, a keeper's house is attached.

Initially, the lighthouse was lit by kerosene, however the light source was later replaced by Dalén light using carbide (acetylene gas). Finally, it was electrified. The lighthouse's lantern has a 500mm catadioptric cylindrical lens and a 1,000 W lamp. At a focal height of 36 m (118 ft), it flashes white every 6 seconds, which is visible at a range of 16 nmi (30 km) in the Sea of Marmara.

Ahırkapı Feneri is listed in Turkey under the code "TUR-056" and its radio call sign is TC1ALH. It is operated and maintained by the Coastal Safety Authority (Turkish: Kıyı Emniyeti Genel Müdürlüğü) of the Ministry of Transport and Communication.

== Transport ==
The lighthouse is in walking distance from the Cankurtaran railway station.

== See also ==
- List of lighthouses in Turkey
