= Bosporus =

Narrow strait in northwestern Turkey

Bosporus Strait
- İstanbul Boğazı (Turkish)
- Location within Istanbul Location within Turkey Location within Europe Location within Asia
- Interactive map of Bosporus Strait
- Coordinates: 41°07′10″N 29°04′31″E
- Type: Strait
- Part of: Turkish Straits
- Basin countries: Turkey
- Max. length: 30 km (19 mi)
- Max. width: 3.7 km (2.3 mi)
- Min. width: 750 m (2,460 ft)
- Average depth: 65 m (213 ft)
- Max. depth: 124 m (407 ft)

A map depicting the locations of the Turkish Straits, with the Bosporus in red, and the Dardanelles in yellow. The territory of Turkey is highlighted in green.

Location of the Bosporus (red) relative to the Dardanelles (yellow) and the Sea of Marmara

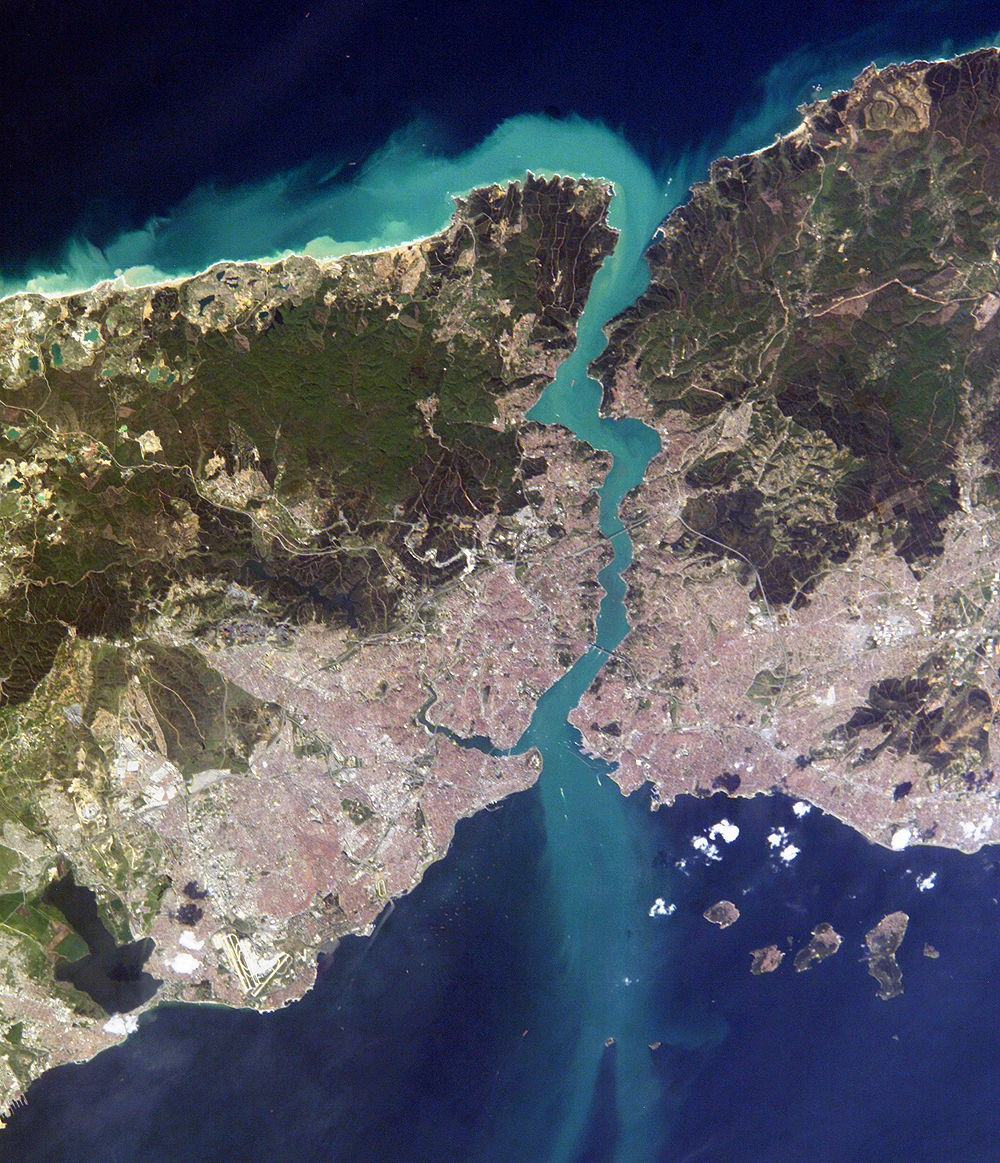
Close-up satellite image of the Bosporus Strait, taken from the International Space Station in April 2004. The body of water at the top is the Black Sea, the one at the bottom is the Marmara Sea, and the Bosporus is the winding waterway that connects the two. The western banks of the Bosporus constitute the geographic starting point of the European continent, while the banks to the east are the geographic beginnings of the continent of Asia. The city of Istanbul is visible along both banks.

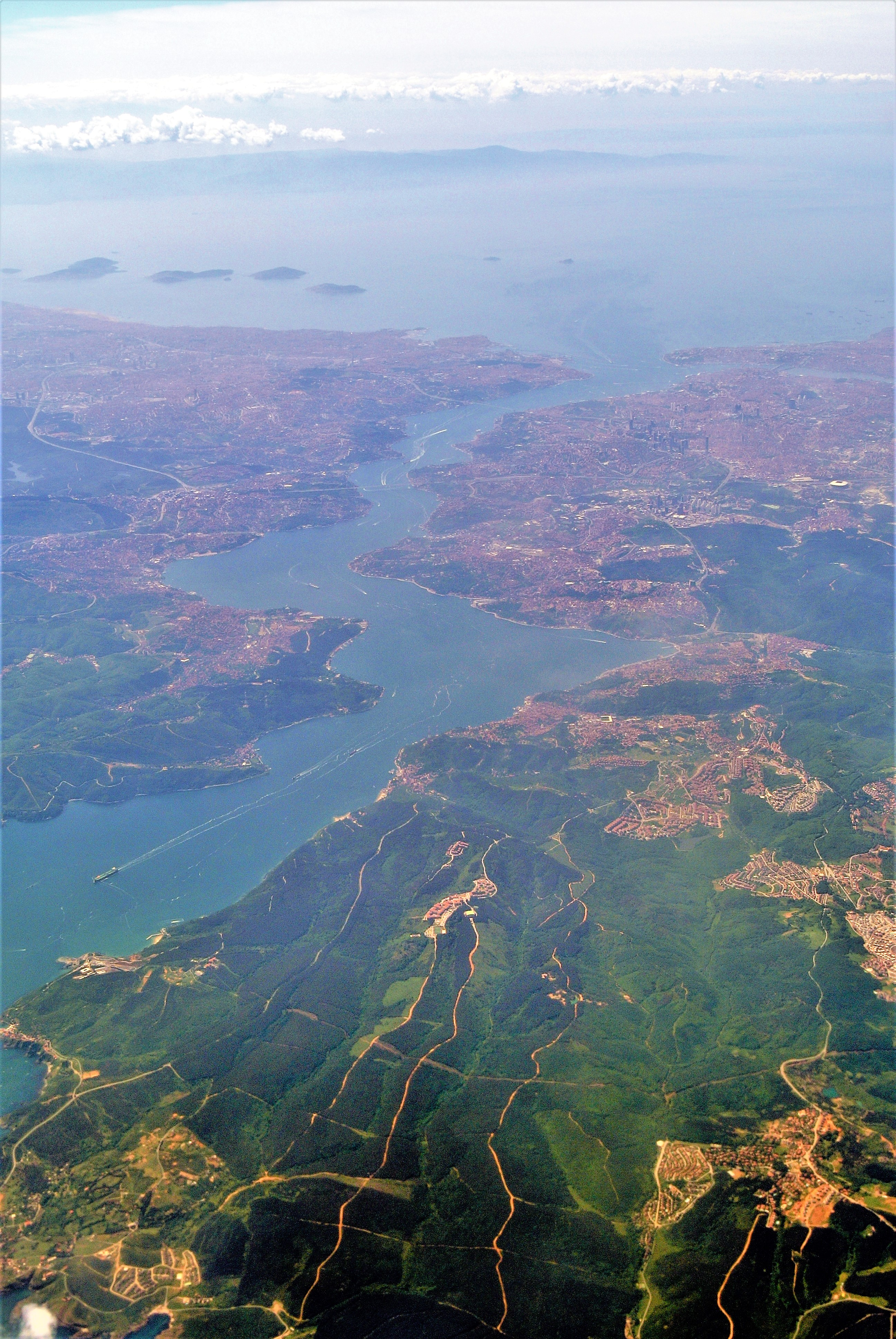
Aerial view of the Bosporus taken from its northern end near the Black Sea (bottom), looking south (top) toward the Marmara Sea, with the city center of Istanbul visible along the strait's hilly banks

The Bosporus or Bosphorus Strait (Note: /ˈbɒs.pər.əs, ˈbɒs.fər.əs/, BOSS-pər-əs, BOSS-fər-əs; (Note: The spelling Bosporus is listed first or exclusively in all major British and American dictionaries (e.g. Lexico.com, Collins English Dictionary, Longman Dictionary of Contemporary English, Merriam-Webster, American Heritage Dictionary, and Random House) as well as the Encyclopædia Britannica and the Columbia Encyclopedia. The American Heritage Dictionary's online version has only this spelling and its search function does not find anything for the spelling Bosphorus. The Columbia Encyclopedia specifies that the pronunciation of the alternative spelling ph is also /p/, but dictionaries also list the pronunciation /f/ for this spelling.) Turkish: İstanbul Boğazı, lit. 'Istanbul strait', colloquially Turkish: Boğaz, lit. 'The strait', Greek: Βόσπορος, romanized: Vósporos) is a strait and an internationally significant waterway located in Turkey and straddled by the city of Istanbul. The Bosporus connects the Black Sea to the Sea of Marmara and forms one of the continental boundaries between Asia and Europe. It also divides Turkey by separating Asia Minor from Thrace. It is the world's narrowest strait used for international navigation.

Most of the shores of the Bosporus Strait, except for the area to the north, are heavily settled, with the city of Istanbul's metropolitan population of 17 million inhabitants extending inland from both banks.

The Bosporus Strait and the Dardanelles Strait at the opposite end of the Sea of Marmara are together known as the Turkish Straits.

Sections of the shore of the Bosporus in Istanbul have been reinforced with concrete or rubble and those sections of the strait prone to deposition are periodically dredged.

== Name ==
The name of the strait comes from the Ancient Greek Βόσπορος (Bósporos), which was folk-etymologised as βοὸς πόρος, i.e. "cattle strait" (like "Ox-ford" (Note: There is a certain (Oxonian) tradition of equating the name "Oxford" with "Bosporus", see e.g. Wolstenholme Parr (1820), Memoir on the propriety of the word Oxford, esp. p. 18.)), from the genitive of boûs βοῦς 'ox, cattle' + poros πόρος 'passage', thus meaning 'cattle-passage', or 'cow passage'. This is a reference to the Greek mythological story of Io, who was transformed into a cow and condemned to wander the Earth until she crossed the Bosporus, where she met the Titan Prometheus, who comforted her by telling her that she would be restored to human form by Zeus and become the ancestor of the greatest of all heroes, Heracles (Hercules).

Io supposedly went ashore near Chrysopolis (present-day Üsküdar), which was named Bous 'the Cow'. The same site was also known as Damalis (Δάμαλις), as it was where the Athenian general Chares had erected a monument to his wife Damalis, which included a colossal statue of a cow (the name δαμάλις translating to 'heifer').

The English spelling with -ph- (Bosphor) is not justified by the ancient Greek name, and dictionaries prefer the spelling with -p-. However, -ph- occurs as a variant in medieval Latin (as Bosphor, and occasionally Bosphorus or Bospherus), and in medieval Greek sometimes as Βόσφορος, giving rise to the French Bosphore, the Spanish Bósforo, the Italian Bosforo and the Russian Босфор. The 12th-century Greek scholar John Tzetzes calls it Damaliten Bosporon (after Damalis), but he also reports that in popular usage the strait was known as Prosphorion during his day, the name of the most ancient northern harbour of Constantinople. In English, the preferred spelling tends to be Bosphorus.

Historically, the Bosporus was also known as the "Strait of Constantinople", or the Thracian Bosporus to distinguish it from the Cimmerian Bosporus in Crimea. These are expressed in Herodotus's Histories, 4.83; as Bosporus Thracius, Bosporus Thraciae, and Βόσπορος Θρᾴκιος (Bósporos Thráikios), respectively. Other names used by Herodotus to refer to the strait include Chalcedonian Bosporus (Bosporus Chalcedoniae, Βόσπορος τῆς Χαλκηδονίης [Bosporos tes Khalkedonies], Herodotus 4.87), or Mysian Bosporus (Bosporus Mysius).

The term eventually came to be used as the common noun βόσπορος, meaning "a strait", and was also formerly applied to the Hellespont in Classical Greek by Aeschylus and Sophocles.

=== Boğaziçi ===
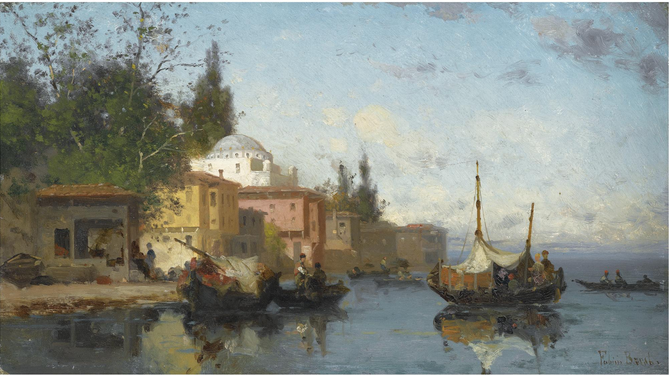
Painting by Fabius Brest

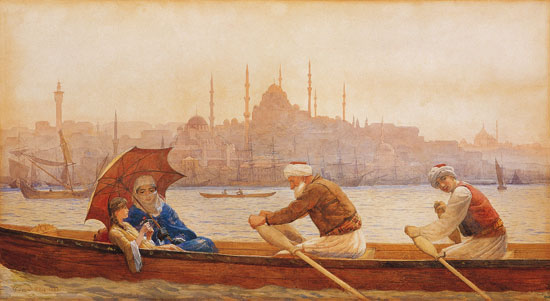
Painting by Tristram Ellis

Boğaziçi consists of those parts of Istanbul and overlapping administrative districts with a view of the Bosphorus. It is considered more particularly to consist of those parts of Istanbul that are situated north of the Golden Horn (Haliç), starting with the district of Beşiktaş on the European side of the Bosphorus. Thus it includes, from south to north, along the European shore, Beşiktaş, Ortaköy, Arnavutköy, Bebek, Rumelihisarı, Baltalimanı, Emirgan, İstinye, Yeniköy, Tarabya, Kireçburnu, Büyükdere and Sarıyer; and, along the Asian shore, Üsküdar, Beylerbeyi, Çengelköy, Vaniköy, Kandilli, Anadolu Hisarı, Kanlıca and Beykoz.

== Geography ==
As a maritime waterway, the Bosporus connects the Black Sea to the Sea of Marmara and thence to the Aegean and Mediterranean seas via the Dardanelles. It also connects various seas along the Eastern Mediterranean, the Balkans, the Near East, and Western Eurasia. Thus, the Bosporus allows maritime connections from the Black Sea all the way to the Mediterranean Sea and the Atlantic Ocean via Gibraltar, and to the Indian Ocean through the Suez Canal, making it a crucial international waterway, in particular for the passage of goods coming from Russia.

There is one very small island in the Bosporus just off Kuruçeşme. Now generally known as Galatasaray Island (Galatasaray Adası), this was given to the Armenian architect Sarkis Balyan by Sultan Abdülhamid II in 1880. The house he built on it was later demolished. The island became a walled garden and then a water sports centre, before it was given to the Galatasaray Sports Club, hence its name. However, in the 2010s it was completely overbuilt with nightclubs and the government had these torn down in 2017. It reopened exclusively to the Galatasaray club members in the summer of 2022.

=== Formation ===
The exact cause and date of the formation of the Bosporus remain a subject of debate among geologists. One recent hypothesis, dubbed the Black Sea deluge hypothesis, which was launched by a study of the same name in 1997 by two scientists from Columbia University, postulates that the Bosporus was flooded around 5600 BC (revised to 6800 BC in 2003) when the rising waters of the Mediterranean Sea and the Sea of Marmara broke through to the Black Sea, which at the time, according to the hypothesis, was a low-lying body of fresh water.

Many geologists, however, claim that the strait is much older, even if relatively young on a geologic timescale.

=== Present morphology ===
The limits of the Bosporus are defined as the line connecting the lighthouses of Rumeli Feneri and Anadolu Feneri in the north, and between the Ahırkapı Feneri and the Kadıköy İnciburnu Feneri in the south ("Fener" is Turkish for lighthouse). Between these limits, the strait is 31 km (17 nmi) long, with a width of 3,329 m (1.798 nmi) at the northern entrance and 2,826 m (1.526 nmi) at the southern entrance. Its maximum width is 3,420 m (1.85 nmi) between Umuryeri and Büyükdere Limanı, and minimum width is 700 m (0.38 nmi) between Kandilli Point and Aşiyan.

The depth of the Bosporus varies from 13 to 110 m (43 to 361 ft) in midstream with an average of 65 m (213 ft). The deepest point is between Kandilli and Bebek, at 110 m (360 ft). The shallowest locations are off Kadıköy İnciburnu at 18 m (59 ft) and off Aşiyan Point at 13 m (43 ft).

The southbound flow of water is 16 000 m^{3}/s (fresh water at the surface) and the northbound flow is 11 000 m^{3}/s (salt water near the bottom). Dan Parsons and researchers at the University of Leeds School of Earth and Environment describe a Black Sea undersea river.

The Golden Horn is an estuary off the main strait that historically acted as a moat to protect Constantinople from attack, as well as providing sheltered anchorage for the imperial navies of various empires until the 19th century, after which it became a historic neighbourhood at the heart of Istanbul.

=== Newer explorations ===
Before the 20th century it was already known that the Black Sea and the Sea of Marmara flow into each other in a geographic example of "density flow". Then in August 2010, a continuous 'underwater channel' of suspension composition was discovered flowing along the floor of the Bosporus, which would be the sixth largest river on Earth if it were on land. The 2010 team of scientists, led by the University of Leeds, used a robotic "yellow submarine" to observe detailed flows within this "undersea river", scientifically referred to as a submarine channel, for the first time. Submarine channels are similar to land rivers, but they are formed by density currents—underwater flow mixtures of sand, mud and water that are denser than sea water and so sink and flow along the bottom. These channels are the main transport pathway for sediments to the deep sea where they form sedimentary deposits.

The team studied the detailed flow within these channels and its findings included that:

The channel complex and the density flow provide the ideal natural laboratory for investigating and detailing the structure of the flow field through the channel. Our initial findings show that the flow in these channels is quite different to the flow in river channels on land. Specifically, as flow moves around a bend it spirals in the opposite direction in the deep sea compared to the spiral found in river channels on land. This is important in understanding the sedimentology and layers of sediment deposited by these systems.

The central tenet of the Black Sea deluge hypothesis is that as the ocean rose 72.5 metres (238 ft) at the end of the last Ice Age when the massive ice sheets melted, the sealed Bosporus was overwhelmed by a spectacular flood that increased the then fresh water Black Sea Lake by 50%, and drove people back from the shores for many months. This hypothesis was supported by the findings of undersea explorer Robert Ballard, who discovered settlements along the old shoreline; scientists dated the flood to 7500 BP or 5500 BC from fresh-salt water microflora. Driven out by the rapidly rising water, which must have been terrifying and inexplicable, people spread to all corners of the Western world carrying the story of a major flood. As the waters surged, they scoured a network of sea-floor channels less resistant to denser suspended solids in liquid, which remains a very active layer today.

The first images of these submarine channels showing them to be of great size, were obtained in 1999 during a NATO SACLANT Undersea Research project using jointly the NATO RV Alliance, and the Turkish Navy survey ship Çubuklu. In 2002, a survey carried out on board the Ifremer RV Le Suroit for BlaSON project (Lericolais, et al., 2003) completed the multibeam mapping of this underwater channel fan-delta. A complete map was published in 2009 using these previous results together with high quality mapping obtained in 2006 by researchers at Memorial University of Newfoundland who were project partners in the study.

The project was led by Jeff Peakall and Daniel Parsons at the University of Leeds, in collaboration with the University of Southampton, Memorial University of Newfoundland, and the Institute of Marine Sciences. The survey was run and coordinated from the Institute of Marine Sciences research ship, the R/V Koca Piri Reis.

=== Villages ===
The shores of the Bosporus were once lined with small fishing villages that had grown up since Byzantine times but really came into their own in the 19th century. Until the early 20th century most were only accessible by boat (known as caiques) along the Bosporus since there were no coast roads. Today the villages are no more than suburbs of Greater Istanbul but many retain the memory of their original village status in the suffix -köy ('village') to their names. e.g. Ortaköy, Yeniköy, Arnavutköy, Çengelköy and Vaniköy. These villages often had distinct identities associated with agriculture: Arnavutköy, for example, was associated with strawberry-growing while Çengelköy was famous for its sweet cucumbers.

== Human history ==
As part of the only passage between the Black Sea and the Mediterranean, the Bosporus has always been of great importance from a commercial and military point of view, and it remains strategically important today. It is a major sea access route for numerous countries, including Russia and Ukraine. Control over it has been an objective of a number of conflicts in modern history, notably the Russo-Turkish War (1877–78), as well as of the attack of the Allied Powers on the Dardanelles during the 1915 Battle of Gallipoli in the course of World War I. In 2022, during the Russian invasion of Ukraine, the Bosporus' importance as a route by which grain reached the world was thrown into sharp profile.

=== Ancient Greek, Persian, Roman and Byzantine eras (pre-1453) ===
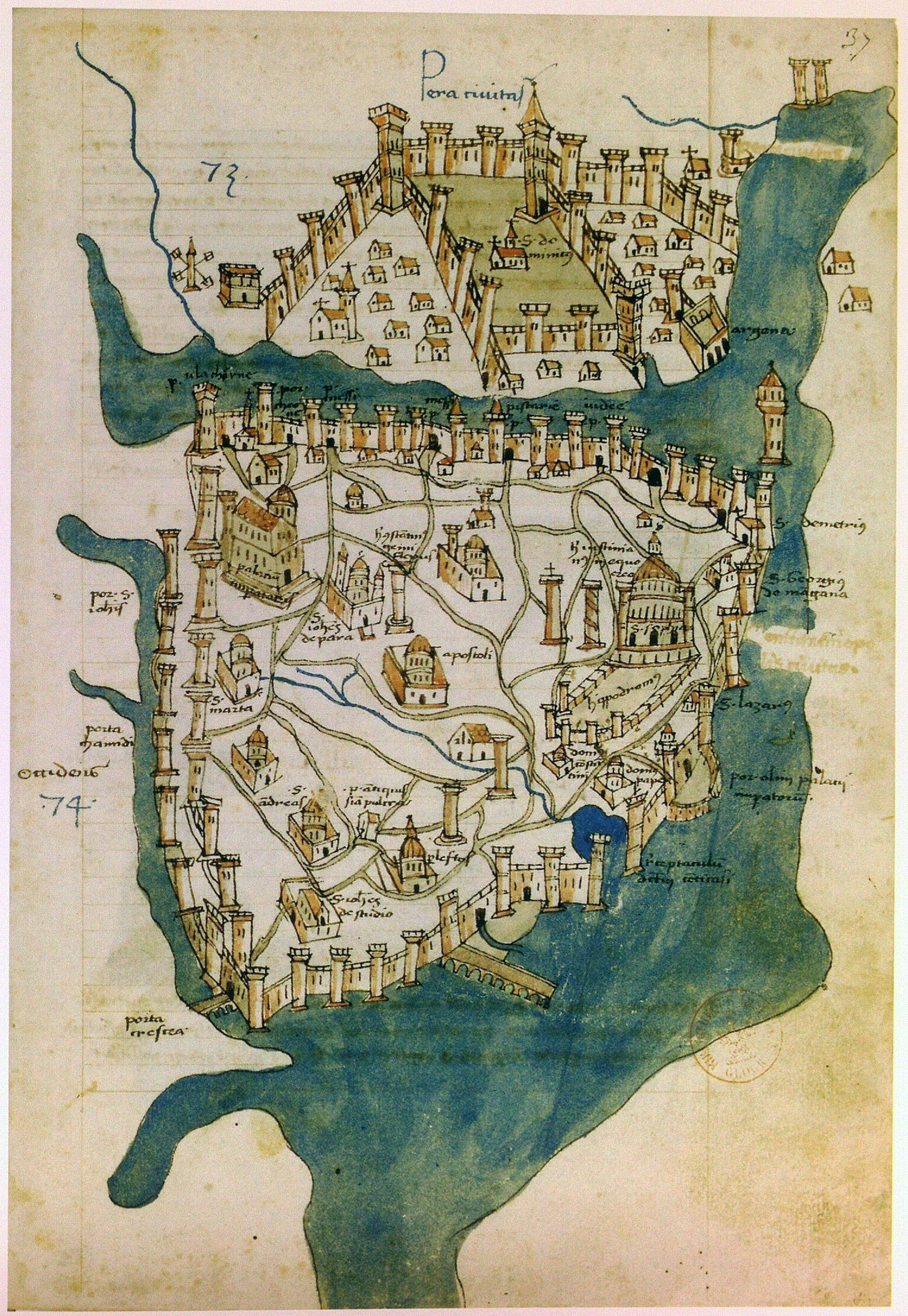
Map of Constantinople (modern-day Istanbul), designed in 1422 by Florentine cartographer Cristoforo Buondelmonti. This is the oldest surviving map of the city, and the only surviving map that predates the Turkish conquest of 1453. The Bosporus is visible along the right-hand side of the map, wrapping vertically around the historic city.

The strategic importance of the Bosporus dates back millennia. In the 5th century BC the Greek city-state of Athens, which depended on grain imports from the Black Sea ports of Scythia, maintained critical alliances with cities which controlled the straits, such as the Megarian colony of Byzantium.

In an attempt to subdue the Scythian horsemen who roamed across the north of the Black Sea, the Persian King Darius I the Great (r. 522 BC – 486 BC) crossed the Bosporus, then marched towards the River Danube. His army crossed the Bosporus using an enormous bridge made by connecting boats. This bridge essentially connected the farthest geographic tip of Asia to Europe, encompassing at least some 1,000 metres of open water. Years later, Xerxes I would construct a similar boat bridge across the Dardanelles (Hellespont) strait (480 BC), during his invasion of Greece.

The Byzantines called the Bosporus "Stenon" and used the following major toponyms in the area:

- on the European side:
  - Bosporios Akra
  - Argyropolis
  - St. Mamas
  - St. Phokas
  - Hestiai or Michaelion
  - Phoneus
  - Anaplous or Sosthenion
- on the Asian side:
  - Hieron tower
  - Eirenaion
  - Anthemiou
  - Sophianai
  - Bithynian Chrysopolis

The strategic significance of the strait was one of the factors in the decision of the Roman Emperor Constantine the Great to found his new capital, Constantinople, there in AD 330. This then became the capital of the Eastern Roman Empire.

=== Ottoman era (1453–1922) ===
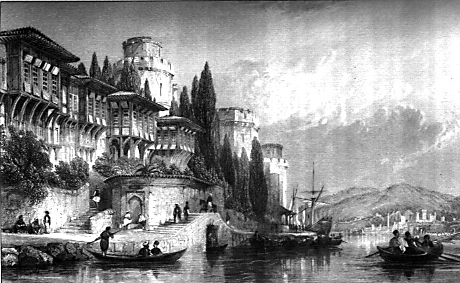
The Bosphorus, with the Castles of Europe & Asia. 19th-century engraving by Thomas Allom. The castles are Rumelihisarı and Anadoluhisarı, respectively. The original is a watercolor available in the online collection of the Victoria and Albert Museum.

On 29 May 1453, the then-emergent Ottoman Empire conquered the city of Constantinople following a lengthy campaign during which the Ottomans constructed fortifications on each side of the strait, the Anadoluhisarı (Anatolian Castle, 1393) and the Rumelihisarı (European Castle, 1451), in preparation for not only the primary battle but to assert long-term control over the Bosporus and surrounding waterways. The final 53-day campaign, which resulted in Ottoman victory, constituted an important turn in world history. Together with Christopher Columbus's first voyage to the Americas in 1492, the 1453 conquest of Constantinople is commonly noted as among the events that brought an end to the Middle Ages and marked the transition to the Renaissance and the Age of Discovery.

The event also marked the end of the Byzantines—the final remnants of the Roman Empire—and the transfer of the control of the Bosporus into Ottoman hands. The Ottomans then made Constantinople their new capital, and the base from which they expanded their empire in the centuries that followed.

At its peak between the 16th and 18th centuries, the Ottoman Empire was able to use the strategic importance of the Bosporus to wrest control of the entire Black Sea area, which they regarded as an "Ottoman lake", from which Russian warships were prohibited.

Subsequently, several international treaties have governed access to the strait. Under the Treaty of Hünkâr İskelesi of 8 July 1833, the Bosporus and Dardanelles straits were to be closed to the naval vessels of other powers on Russian demand. By the terms of the London Straits Convention, concluded on 13 July 1841 between the Great Powers of Europe (Russia, the United Kingdom, France, Austria and Prussia), the "ancient rule" of the Ottoman Empire was re-established by closing the Turkish Straits to all warships, barring those of the Sultan's allies during wartime. This benefited British naval power at the expense of the Russians, as the latter then lacked direct access to the Mediterranean.

==== Summer Embassies ====
During the 19th century many of the foreign powers represented in Constantinople maintained second embassies up the Bosporus and would relocate their staff there during the hot, humid summer months. Most of these summer embassies were on the European shore at Yeniköy (Austrian), Tarabya (German, English, French, Italian) and Büyükdere (Spanish, Russian). Some of the buildings still survive today although the British Summer Embassy burnt down in 1911 and the Italian Summer Embassy, a fine building by Raimondo d'Aronco, survives in very dilapidated condition.

=== Turkish republican era (1923–present) ===
Following the First World War, the 1920 Treaty of Sèvres demilitarised the strait and made it an international territory under the control of the League of Nations. This was amended by the Treaty of Lausanne (1923), which restored the straits to Turkey but allowed all foreign warships and commercial shipping to traverse the straits freely. Turkey eventually rejected the terms of that treaty, and remilitarised the straits area. The reversion was formalised under the Montreux Convention Regarding the Regime of the Turkish Straits of 20 July 1936. That convention – which is still in force – treats the straits as an international shipping lane except that Turkey retains the right to restrict the naval traffic of non–Black Sea states.

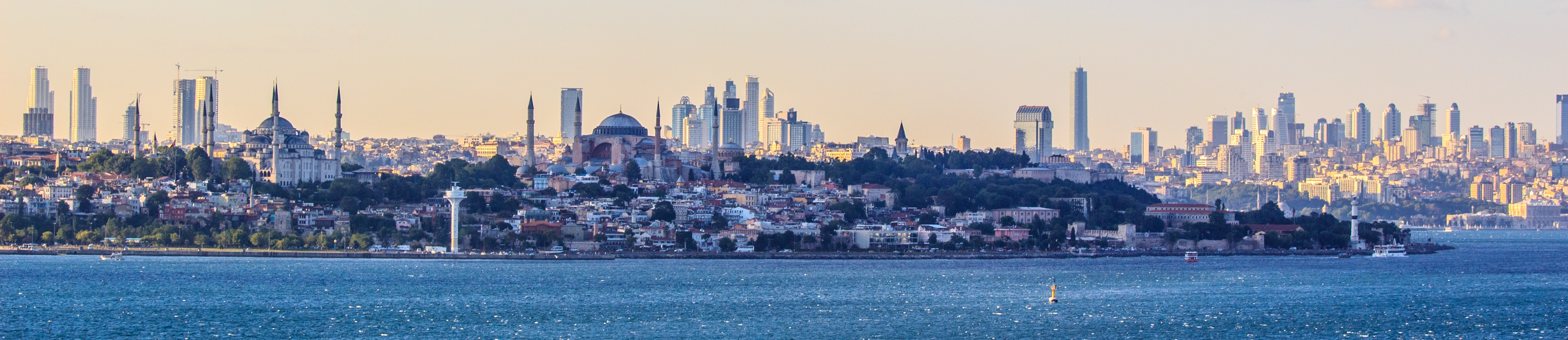
Modern (2012) view of the European side of Istanbul from the southern entrance to the Bosporus

Turkey was neutral in the Second World War until February 1945, and the straits were closed to the warships of belligerent nations during this time, although some German auxiliary vessels were permitted to transit. In diplomatic conferences, Soviet representatives had expressed an interest in obtaining naval bases on the straits. This, together with Stalin's demands for the restitution of the Turkish provinces of Kars, Artvin and Ardahan to the Soviet Union (which were lost by Turkey in the Russo-Turkish War of 1877–1878, but were regained with the Treaty of Kars in 1921), was a consideration in Turkey's decision to abandon neutrality in foreign affairs. Turkey declared war against Germany in February 1945, but did not engage in offensive actions.

Turkey joined NATO in 1952, thus affording the straits even more strategic importance as a commercial and military waterway.

During the early 21st century, the Turkish Straits have become particularly important for the oil industry. Russian oil, from ports such as Novorossiysk, was exported by tankers primarily to the U.S. via the Bosporus and the Dardanelles straits.

=== Istanbul Canal ===
In 2011, Turkey proposed to build a 50 km (31 mi) canal west of the Bosporus, suggesting that it would reduce the risk presented to the Bosporus by oil tankers and other cargo ships. The project proved highly controversial and, as of 2022, work had not been started on building the canal even though a route for it had been established.

== In mythology ==
The Bosphorus takes its name from the Greek mythological story of Io, who was transformed into a cow and, pursued by a gadfly, was condemned to wander the Earth until she reached the strait. There she met the Titan Prometheus, who comforted her by telling her that she would be restored to human form by Zeus and become the ancestor of the greatest of all heroes, Heracles (Hercules).

According to ancient Greek mythology, it was said that colossal floating rocks known as the Symplegades, or Clashing Rocks, once guarded both sides of the Bosporus and destroyed any ship that attempted to pass through the strait by crushing them. Their destructive power was finally overcome by the Argonaut hero Jason who managed to pass between them unscathed, whereupon the rocks became fixed, opening Greek access to the Black Sea.

== Crossings ==
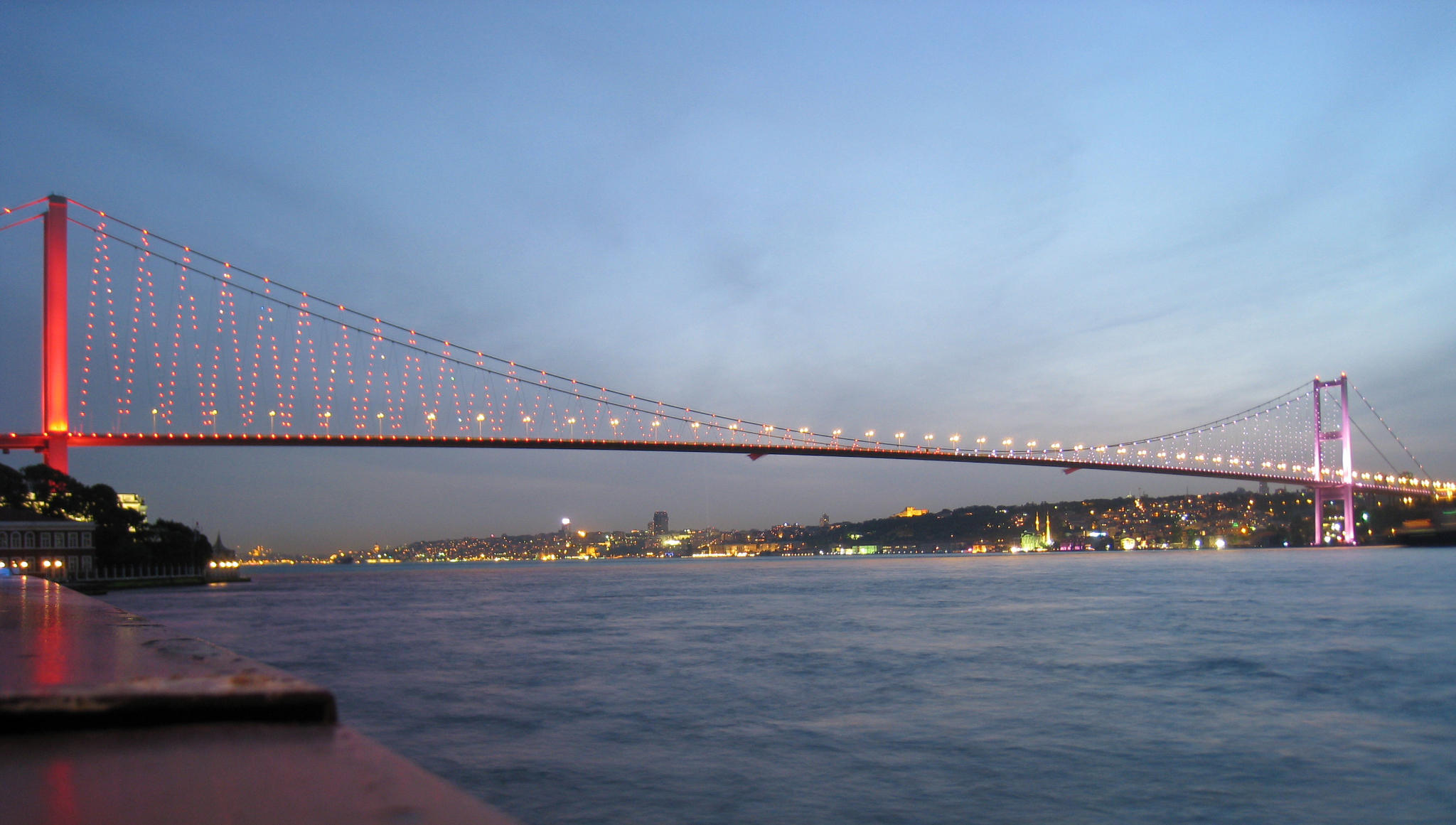
15 July Martyrs Bridge (Bosphorus Bridge), the first to be built across the Bosporus, completed in 1973

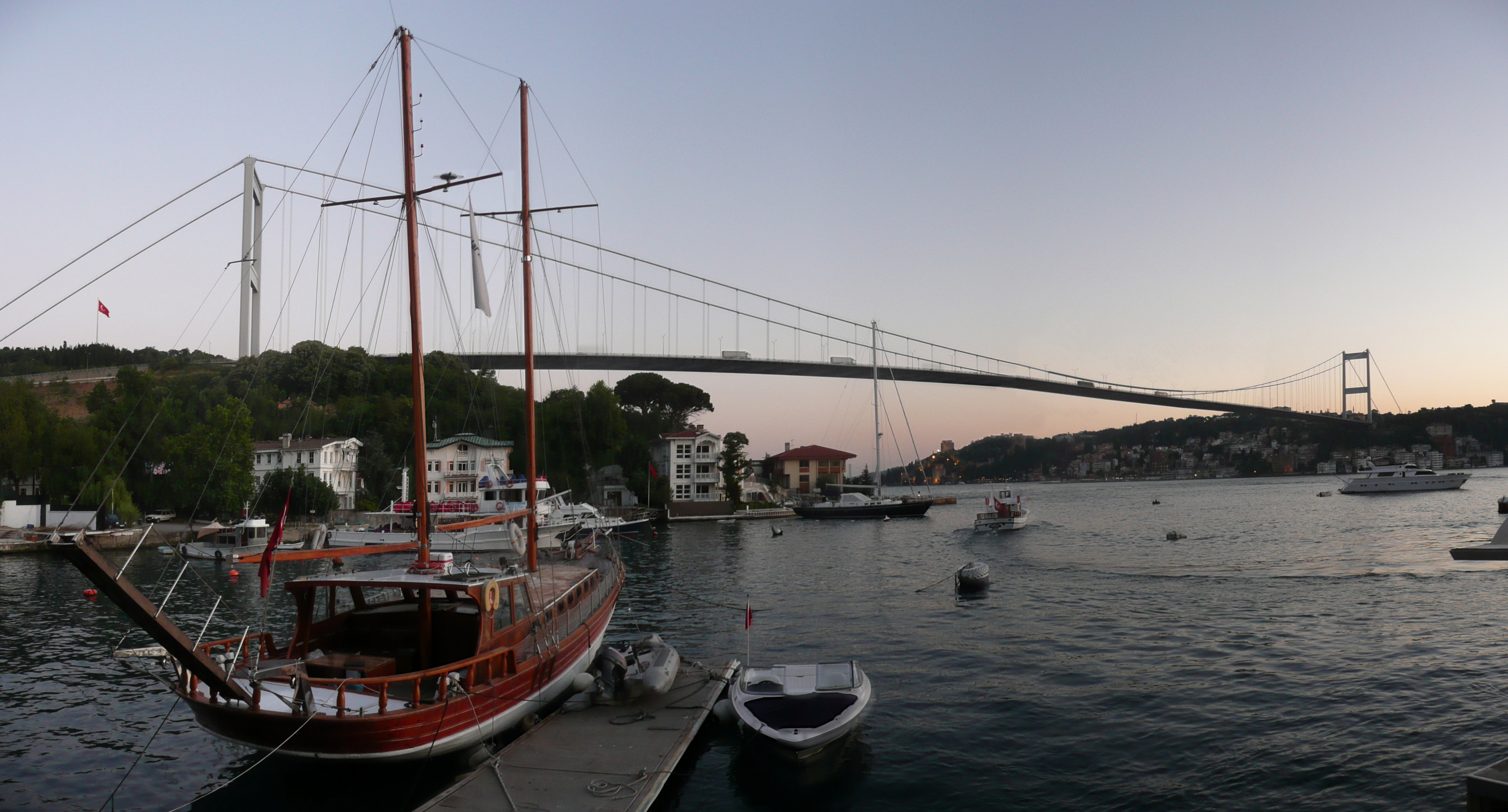
Fatih Sultan Mehmet Bridge, the second crossing built in 1988, looking from the Asian side towards Rumelihisarı on the European side of the Bosporus

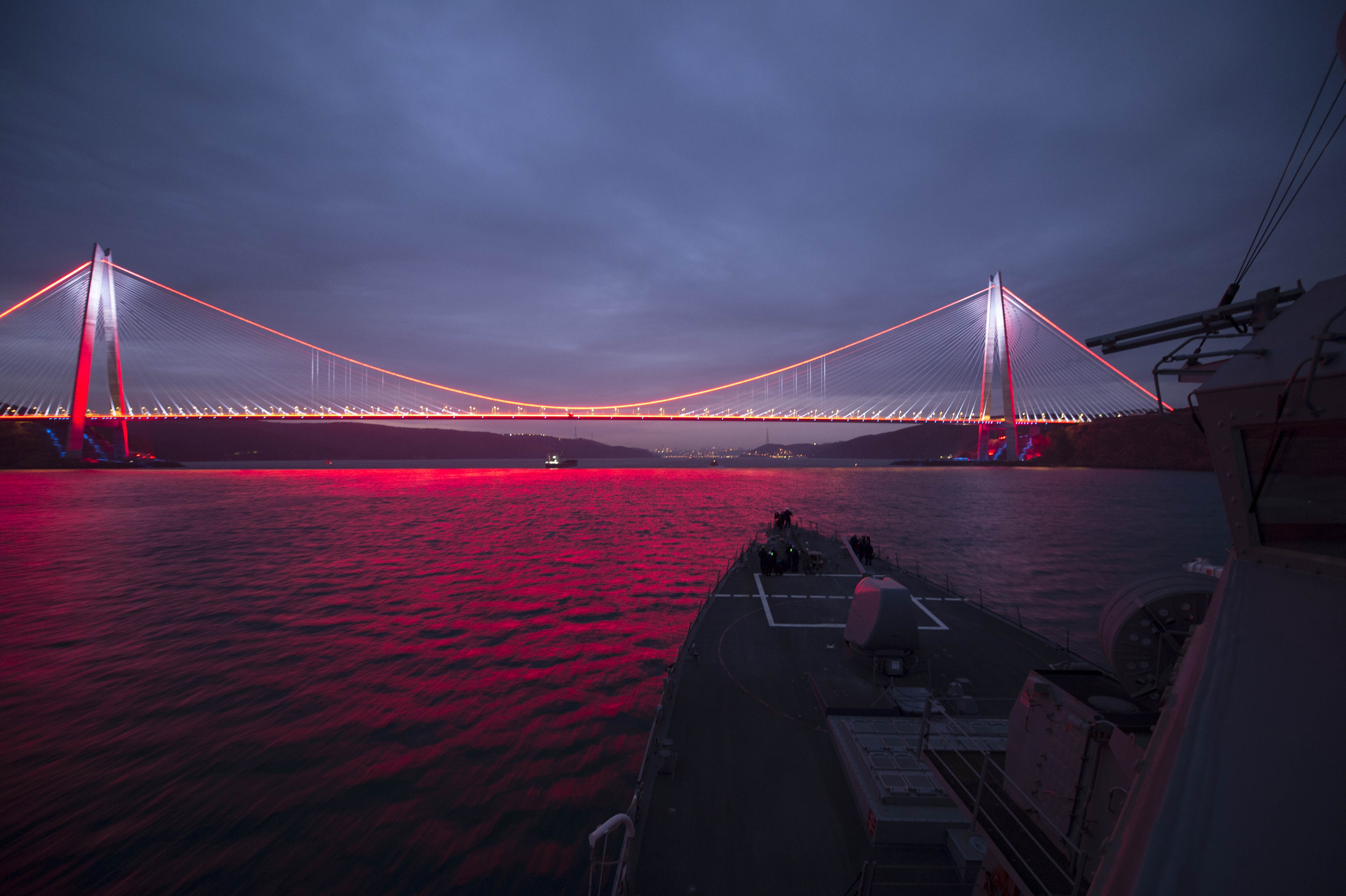
Yavuz Sultan Selim Bridge, the third and most recent bridge, in September 2016. The bridge was opened on August 2016.

Two banks of the Bosphorus Strait are connected by 4 highways (3 bridges and 1 undersea road tunnel) and 1 railway tunnel in addition to numerous maritime lines. A new railway tunnel for Istanbul Metro network is planned to be opened in 2028.

=== Maritime ===
The Bosporus is traversed by numerous passenger and vehicular ferries daily, as well as by recreational and fishing boats ranging from dinghies to yachts owned by both public and private entities.

The strait also serves a significant amount of international commercial shipping traffic in the form of freighters and tankers. Between its northern limits at Rumeli Feneri and Anadolu Feneri and its southern ones at Ahırkapı Feneri and Kadıköy İnciburnu Feneri, there are numerous dangerous points for large-scale maritime traffic that require sharp turns and management of visual obstructions. Famously, the stretch between Kandilli Point and Aşiyan requires a 45-degree course alteration in a location where the currents can reach 7 to 8 knots (3.6 to 4.1 m/s). To the south, at Yeniköy, the necessary course alteration is 80 degrees. Compounding these difficult changes in trajectory, the rear and forward sight lines at Kandilli and Yeniköy are also completely blocked prior to and during the course alteration, making it impossible for ships approaching from the opposite direction to see around the bends. The risks posed by this geography are further multiplied by the heavy ferry traffic across the strait, linking the European and Asian sides of the city. As such, all the dangers and obstacles characteristic of narrow waterways are present and acute in this vital sea lane.

In 2011, the Turkish Government started to discuss creating a man-made canal roughly 80 kilometres (50 mi) long that would run north–south through the western edges of Istanbul Province as a second route from the Black Sea to the Marmara. It was suggested that this would reduce the risk from shipping to the Bosporus. The controversial Kanal İstanbul project continues to be debated.

In 2022, the dues levied by Turkey for freight ships increased 500% to US$4 per ton, the first change since 1983.

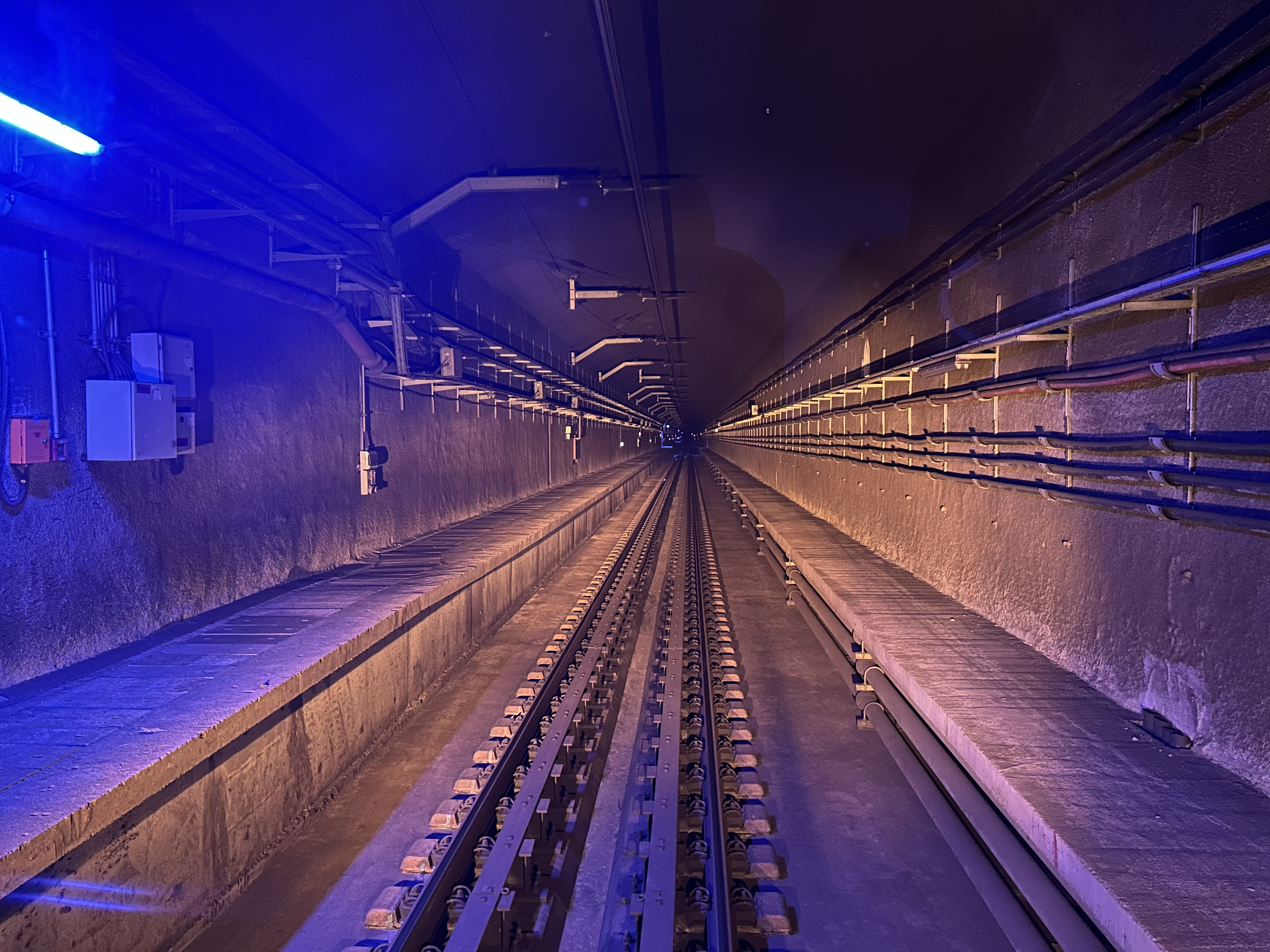
Marmaray Tunnel, the first railway tunnel of Bosphorus Strait, opened to passenger traffic on October 29, 2013, the 90th Anniversary of the Republic.

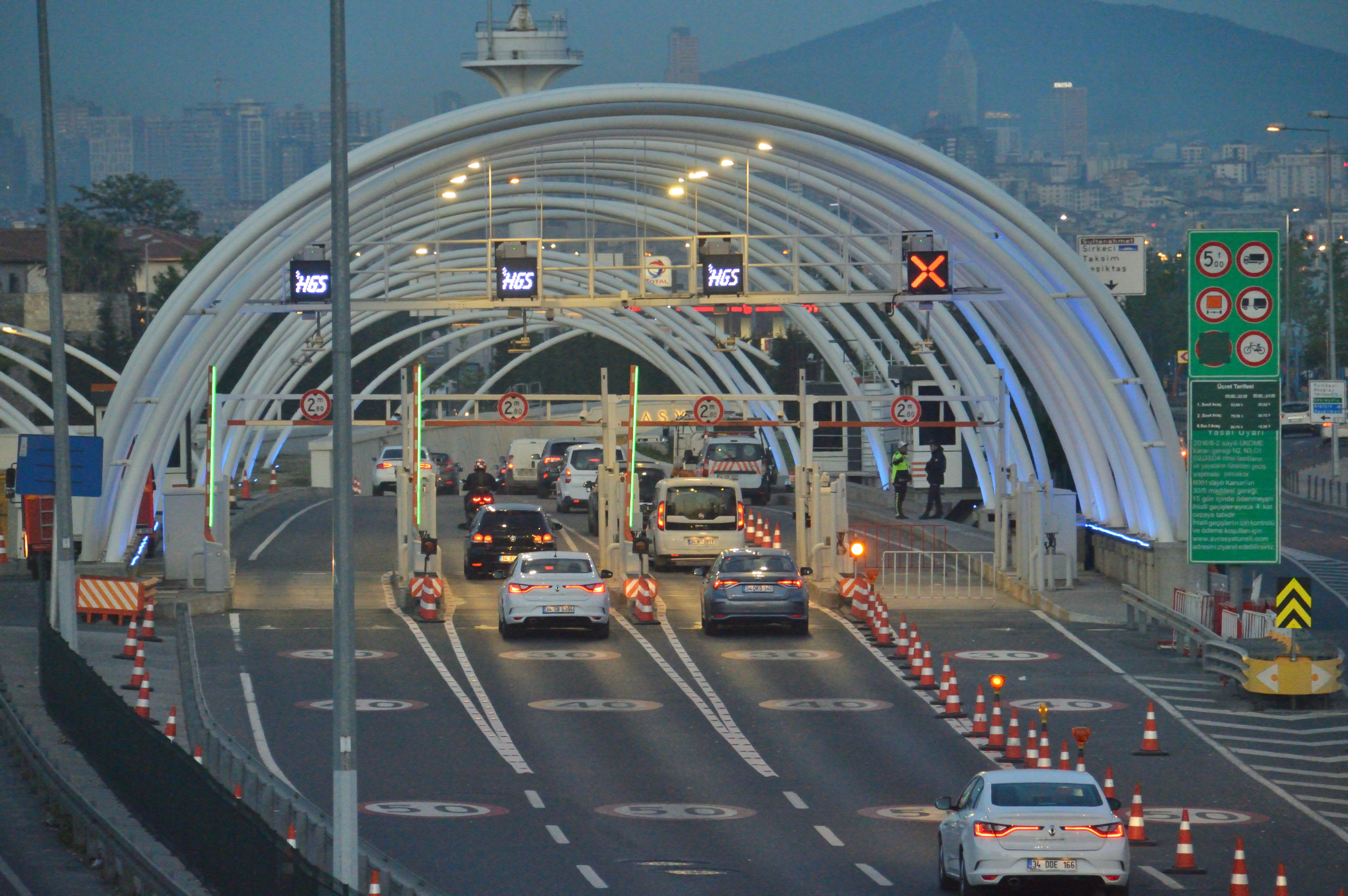
Eurasia Tunnel, the second submarine tunnel of the strait, opened in December 2016. It is the first tunnel of the strait to be built for motor vehicles.

The Bosporus is fairly deep and there is no set limit on the depth and length of a ship, but ships over 150 m (490 ft) long or have a draught of 10 m (33 ft) must pre-book their passage. Those over 300 m (980 ft) long must follow a special clearance procedure. There is an air draft limit of 57 m (187 ft).

=== Land bridges ===
Two suspension bridges and a cable-stayed bridge cross the Bosporus. The first of these, the 1,074 m (3,524 ft) long 15th July Martyrs Bridge was completed in 1973 when it was called the Bosporus Bridge. The second, named Fatih Sultan Mehmet (Bosporus II) Bridge, is 1,090 m (3,576 ft) long, and was completed in 1988 about 5 km (3 mi) north of the first bridge. The first Bosporus Bridge forms part of the O1 Motorway, while the Fatih Sultan Mehmet Bridge forms part of the Trans-European Motorway. The third and most recent bridge, the Yavuz Sultan Selim Bridge, is 2,164 m (7,100 ft) long and was completed in 2016. It is located near the northern end of the Bosporus, between the villages of Garipçe on the European side and Poyrazköy on the Asian side, as part of the "Northern Marmara Motorway", integrated into the existing Black Sea Coastal Highway, and allowing transit traffic to bypass city traffic.

Name	Opening date	Design	Total length	Width	Height	Longest span	Clearance below	Lanes
15 July Martyrs Bridge	30 October 1973	Suspension bridge	1,560 m (5,120 ft)	33.4 m (110 ft)	165 m (541 ft)	1,074 m (3,524 ft)	64 m (210 ft)	6 lanes of Motorway O1
Fatih Sultan Mehmet Bridge	3 July 1988	Suspension bridge	1,510 m (4,950 ft)	39 m (128 ft)	105 m (344 ft)	1,090 m (3,580 ft)	64 m (210 ft)	8 lanes of Motorway O2
Yavuz Sultan Selim Bridge	26 August 2016	Hybrid cable-stayed, suspension bridge	2,164 m (7,100 ft)	58.4 m (192 ft)	322 m (1,056 ft)	1,408 m (4,619 ft)	73 m (240 ft)	8 lanes of Motorway O7 and 1 double-track railway

=== Submarine ===
The Marmaray project, featuring a 13.7 km (8.5 mi) long undersea railway tunnel, opened on 29 October 2013. Approximately 1,400 m (4,593 ft) of the tunnel runs under the strait, at a depth of about 55 m (180 ft).

An undersea water supply tunnel with a length of 5,551 m (18,212 ft), named the Bosporus Water Tunnel, was constructed in 2012 to transfer water from the Melen Creek in Düzce Province (to the east of the Bosporus strait, in northwestern Anatolia) to the European side of Istanbul, a distance of 185 km (115 mi).

The Eurasia Tunnel is a 5.4 km (3.4 mi) undersea highway tunnel designed for vehicular traffic between Kazlıçeşme on the European side of Istanbul and Göztepe on the Asian side. Construction began in February 2011, and the tunnel opened on 20 December 2016.

Up to four submarine fibre optic lines (MedNautilus and possibly others) approach Istanbul, coming from the Mediterranean through the Dardanelles.

Great Istanbul Tunnel is planned to be opened in 2028.

== Strategic importance ==
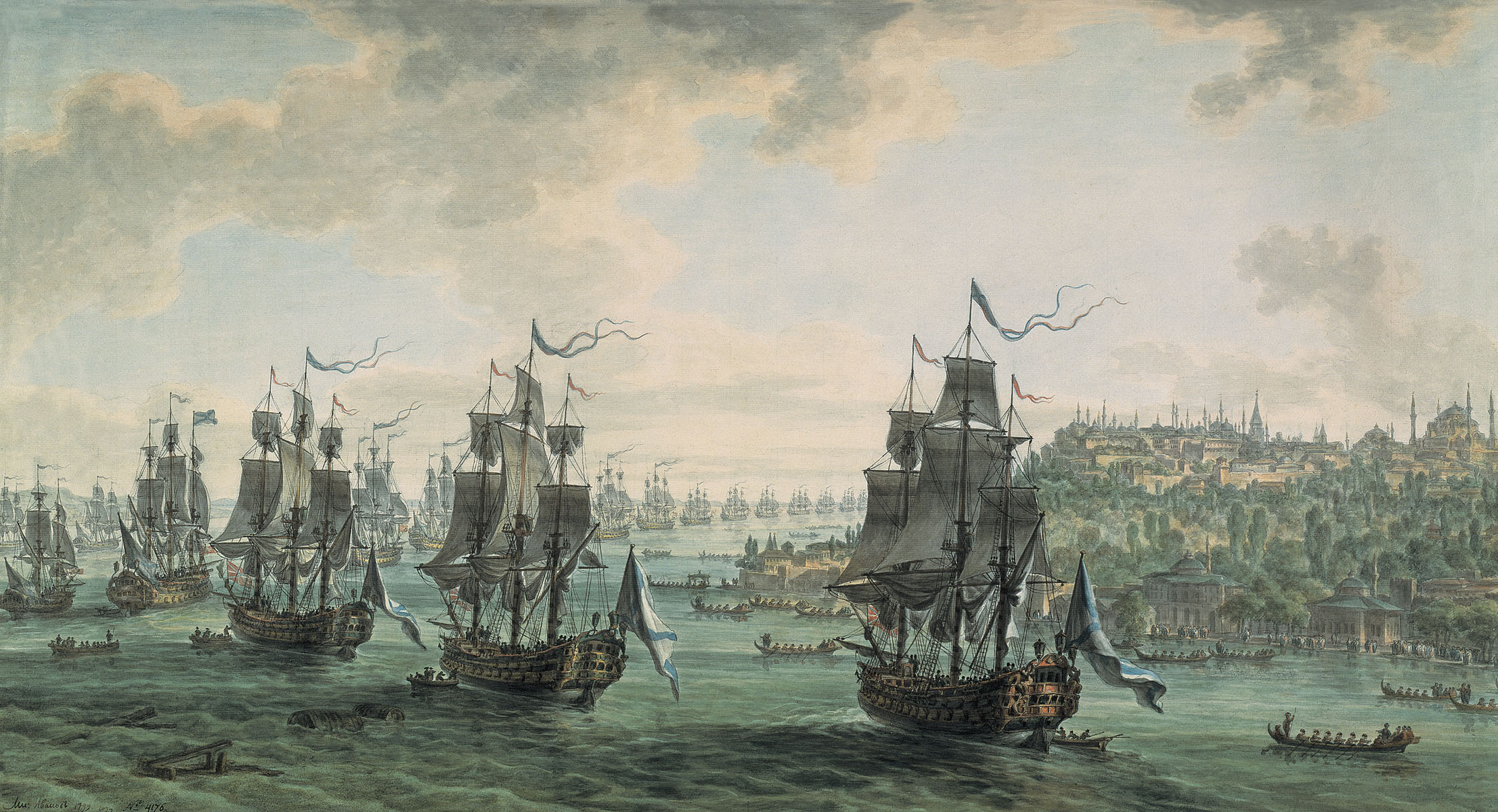
Russian fleet under the command of Admiral Fyodor Ushakov, sailing through the Bosporus

The Bosporus is the only way for Bulgaria, Georgia, Romania, Russia (south-western part) and Ukraine to reach the Mediterranean Sea and other seas. Thus sovereignty over the straits is an important issue for these countries, as well as Turkey, the state the Bosporus actually flows through.

Turkey does not receive tolls from ships passing through the strait. Turkey's military has broad powers in accordance with the terms of the Montreux Convention. As of 2021, the Bosporus Command is located on the shores of the Bosporus and the military ships connected to the Command are anchored in the Bosporus waters.

Located on a peninsula at the intersection of the Black Sea, the Bosporus and the Marmara Sea, Istanbul has historically been one of the most protected and hardest-to-conquer cities from Roman times to the Ottoman Empire. Divided by the Bosporus, it is one of very few intercontinental cities in the world.

== Sightseeing ==
The Bosporus has 620 waterfront houses (yalı) built during the Ottoman period along the strait's European and Asian shorelines. Ottoman palaces such as the Topkapı Palace, Dolmabahçe Palace, Yıldız Palace, Çırağan Palace, Feriye Palaces, Beylerbeyi Palace, Küçüksu Palace, Ihlamur Palace, Hatice Sultan Palace and Adile Sultan Palace also stand on or near its shores. Other buildings and landmarks on the Bosporus include the Kılıç Egyptian Consulate at Bebek, Bebek Mosque, Boğaziçi University, Robert College, Rumeli Castle (RumelihisarI), Borusan Museum of Contemporary Art, Sakıp Sabancı Museum, Sadberk Hanım Museum, Üsküdar Mihrimah Sultan Mosque, Şemsipaşa Mosque, Maiden's Tower (Kızkulesi), Beylerbeyi Mosque, Anadolu Castle (Anadoluhisarı), Kuleli Military High School, Adile Sultan Palace, Küçüksu Pavilion, Khedive's Villa, Beykoz Mecidiye Pavilion and Yoros Castle (Anadaolu Kavağı).

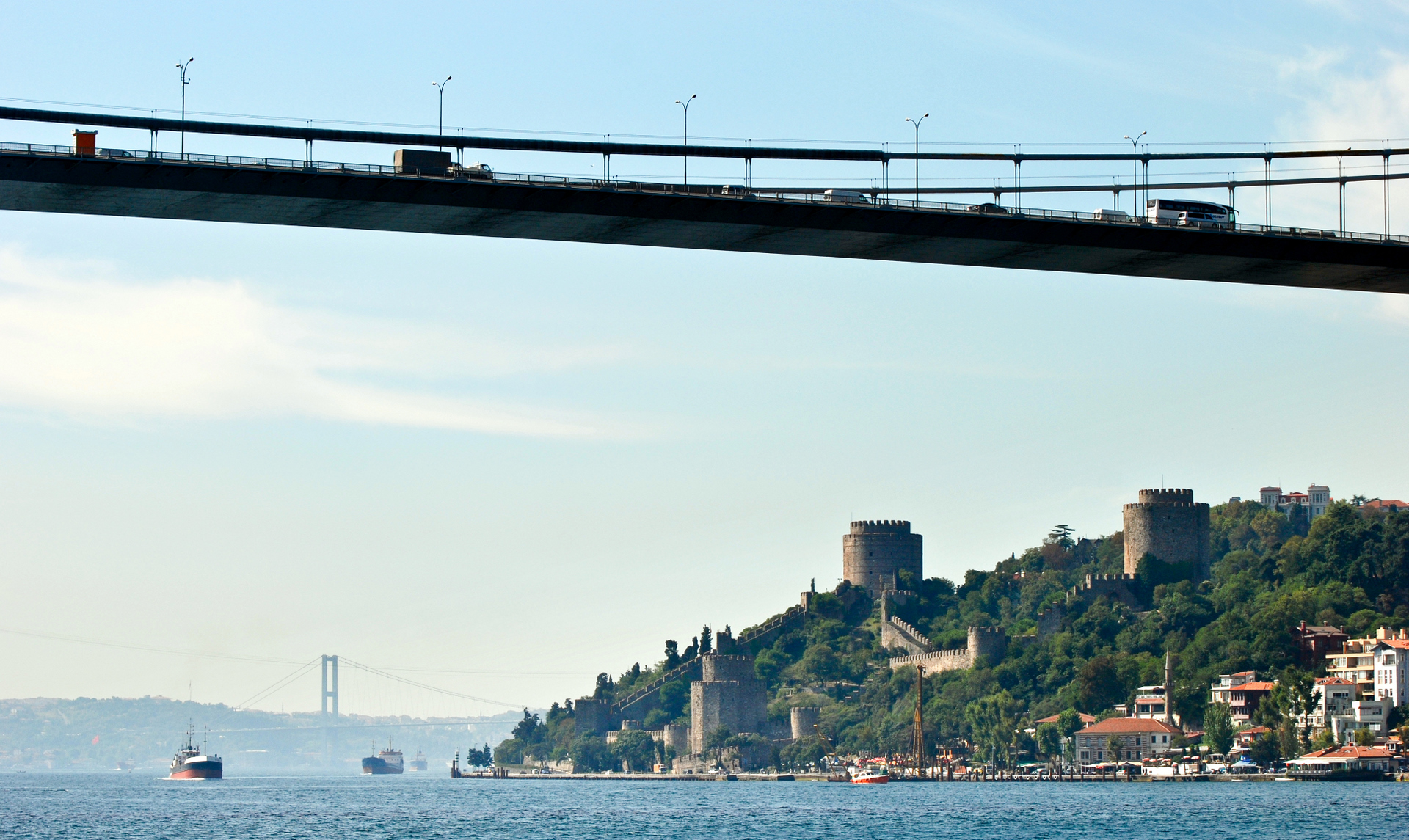
Rumelihisarı, one of the castles on the Bosporus, with two of the suspension bridges which span the strait

Most of the public ferries that traverse the strait leave from Eminönü on the historic peninsula of Istanbul and travel as far as Anadolu Kavağı near the Black Sea. On the way they call briefly at points on both the European and Asian shores. Private ferries, also leaving from Eminönü, travel only as far as one of the first two Bosporus bridges. Ferries from Eminönü also travel as far as Rumeli Kavaği, stopping only at points on the European shore, while other ferries from Üsküdar travel as far as Anadolu Kavağı, stopping only at points on the Asian shore. Frequent public ferries from Eminõnü, Karaköy, Beşiktaş, Kadıköy and Usküdar offer short hops from one side of the Bosporus to the other throughout the day.

Catamaran sea buses offer high-speed commuter services between the European and Asian shores of the Bosporus, but they stop at fewer ports and piers in comparison to the public ferries. Both the public ferries and the sea buses also provide commuter services between the Bosporus and the Prince Islands in the Sea of Marmara.

Tourist cruises are available from various points along the Bosporus, including Ortaköy. The prices vary considerably, and some feature music and dining.

== Architecture ==
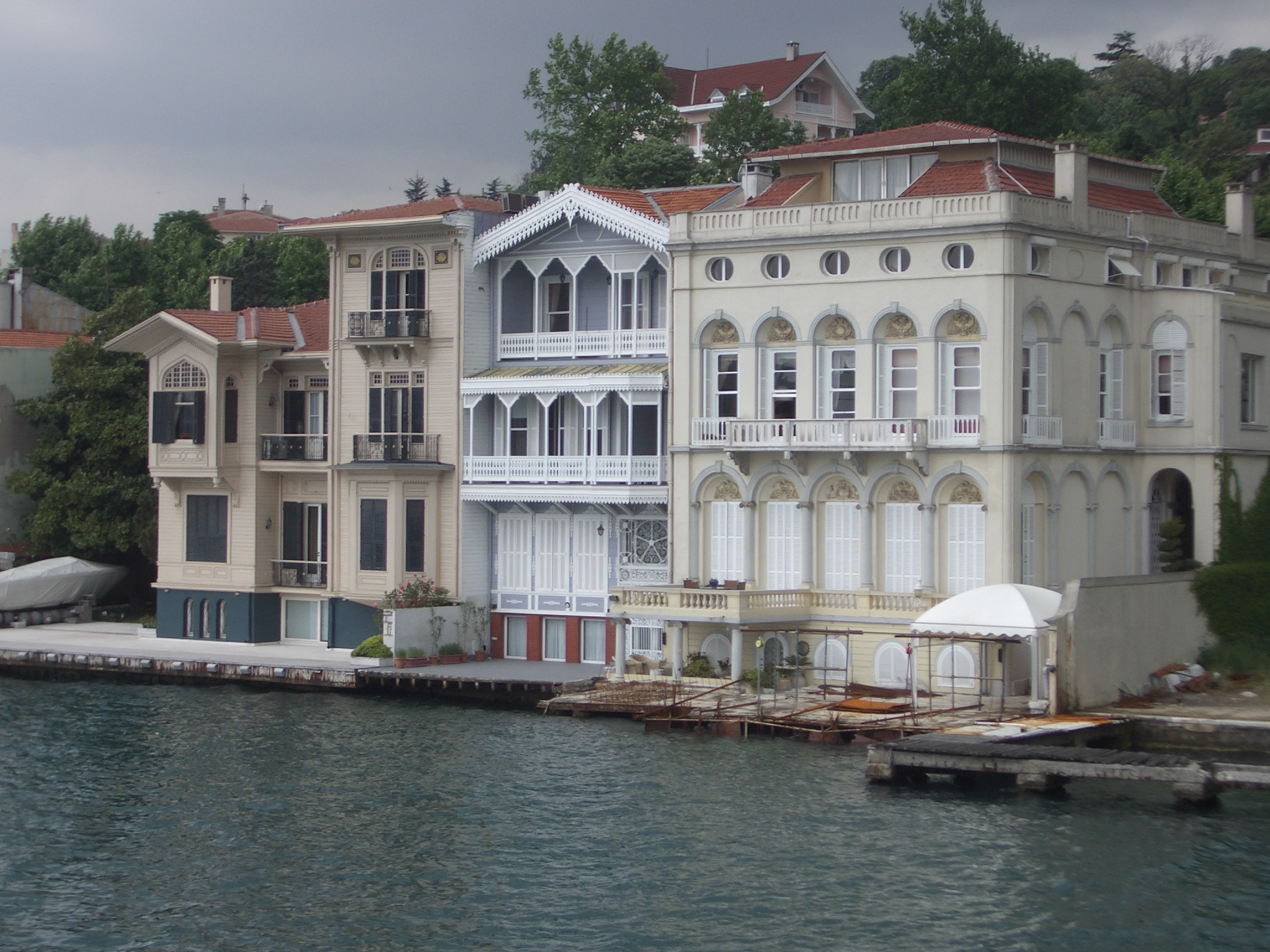
Ottoman-era waterfront houses (yalıs) on the Bosporus

The many yalı (waterside mansions) which were constructed along the shores of the Bosporus during the Ottoman period have long been synonymous with the strait. Those that still preserve their original form are among the most expensive real estate in Turkey although many have been lost to time, weather and 'accidental' fires. The oldest yalı on the European shore is the Şerifler Yalı at Emirgan which was built in the 18th century and belonged for a while to the Şerifs, the hereditary rulers of Mecca. It is still in good condition unlike the oldest yalı on the Asian side which is the Köprülü Amcazade Hüseyin Paşa Yalı at Anadolu Hisarı, built in 1698. Only the central section of this yalı survives and it has been behind hoardings promising restoration since 2009.

Most of the yalıs originally sat right on the water's edge and came with private docks and ports where boats (caiques) could be stored. On the Anatolian shore, some yalıs are still right beside the water but on the European shore most now stand back behind a coast road built on reclaimed land.

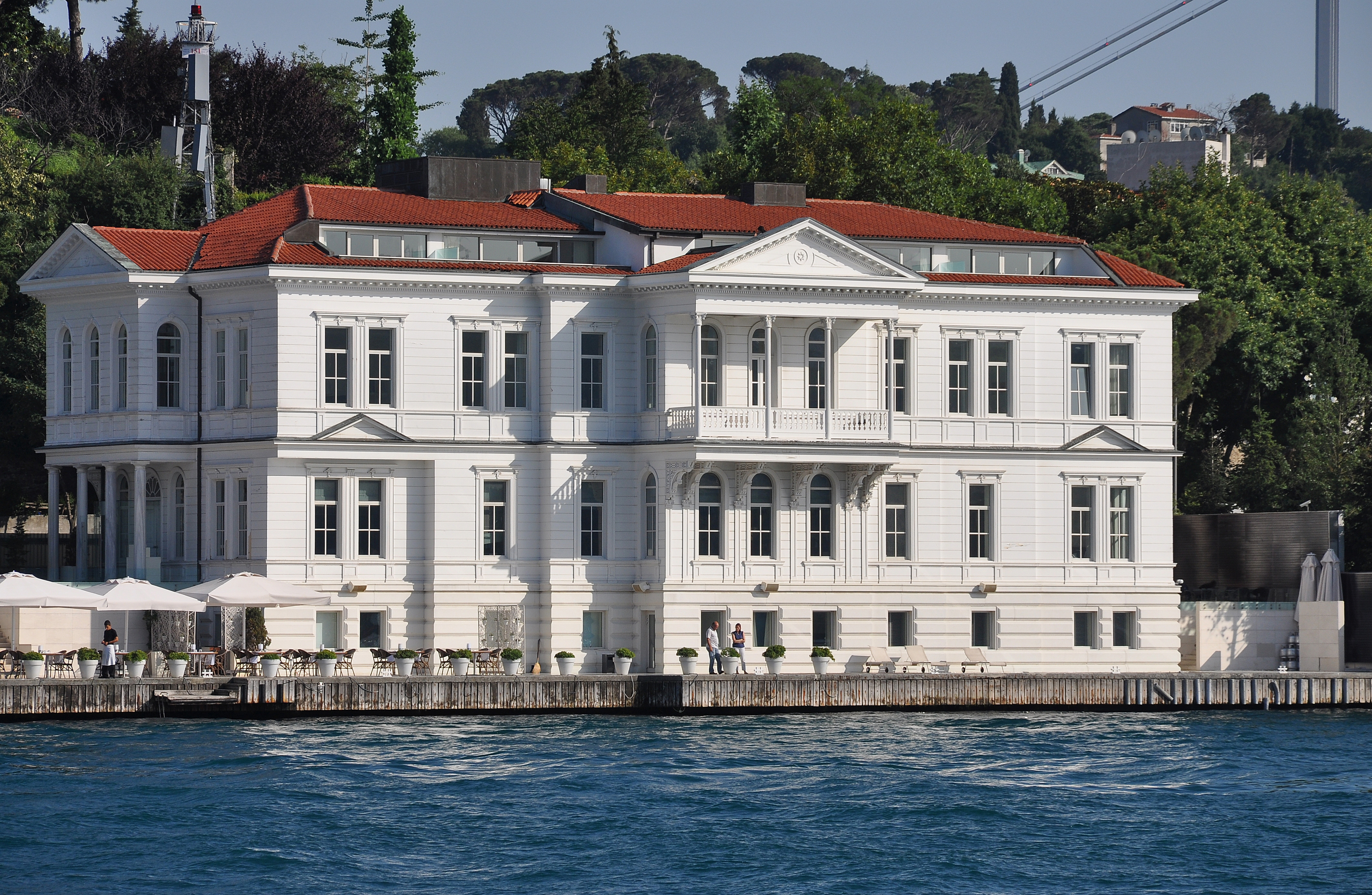
The yalı of Ahmet Rasim Pasha

The original yalıs usually had two main sections: the selamlık which was the public area and the part of the house used by the men, and the haremlik which was the private part of the house reserved for women and the family. These were the luxurious dwellings of the wealthy and some came with their own private hamams (Turkish baths).

=== Egyptian legacy ===
During the late 19th and early 20th centuries, the Egyptian royal family took a great liking to the Bosporus and often spent their summers on its shores. They left behind a legacy of fine buildings on or overlooking its shores, including the building at Bebek that now houses the Egyptian Consulate and the Khedive's Villa (Hıdiv Kasrı) high on the hill above Çubuklu.

== See also ==
- Black Sea trade and economy
- Great Istanbul Tunnel, a proposed three-level road-rail undersea tunnel
- Istanbul Canal
- List of maritime incidents in the Turkish Straits
- Public transport in Istanbul
- Rail transport in Turkey
- Eastern Bosphorus
