= Rumelihisarı Armenian Cemetery =

Armenian cemetery in Sarıyer, Istanbul, Turkey

- Interactive map of Rumelihisarı Armenian Cemetery

Details
- Established: 18th century (estimated)
- Location: Rumelihisarı, Sarıyer, Istanbul
- Country: Turkey
- Coordinates: 41°05′23″N 29°02′55″E
- Type: Private (Armenian Apostolic)
- Owned by: Rumelihisarı Surp Santuht Armenian Church Foundation
- Size: 4,757 square metres (51,200 sq ft)

The Rumelihisarı Armenian Cemetery (Turkish: Rumelihisarı Ermeni Mezarlığı), also known as the Hisarüstü Armenian Cemetery, is an Armenian Apostolic cemetery in the Rumelihisarı neighbourhood of Sarıyer, Istanbul, Turkey.

The cemetery sits on the hill above the neighbourhood and covers about 4,757 square metres (51,200 sq ft). It is thought to have been in use since the 18th century. It belongs to the foundation of the local Surp Santuht Church, the Rumelihisarı Surp Santuht Armenian Church Foundation, which also looks after it.

== Location ==
The cemetery lies above the Rumeli Fortress, in the area known as Hisarüstü, on Ayazma Yolu. The Armenian Patriarchate describes it as standing at the top of the old village of Rumelihisarı. The church it belongs to, Surp Santuht, is further down the slope on Durmuş Dede Sokağı.

== History ==
=== Armenian cemeteries in Istanbul ===
For a long time the Armenians of Istanbul buried their dead in graveyards around their churches. After a plague epidemic killed thousands in 1560, the state banned burials around churches to stop the disease from spreading. Most Armenians on the European side were then buried at the Pangaltı Armenian Cemetery in Harbiye. After 1865 the Greek and Armenian communities were given new burial grounds in Şişli.

Apart from the large city cemeteries, the old villages along both shores of the Bosphorus where non-Muslims lived had their own small, local Christian burial grounds. According to the Patriarchate, the Armenian Apostolic community of Istanbul once had 23 cemeteries. Sixteen of them survive today, and Rumelihisarı is one of them.

=== The Armenian community and Surp Santuht Church ===
The first Surp Santuht (Սուրբ Սանդուխտ Եկեղեցի) Church was a wooden building put up in the late 18th century. It fell into disrepair and was renovated in 1816, but it was torn down the same year and its trustee, Canig Amira, was sent into exile. The church was rebuilt in 1856 under the terms of Canig Amira's will and consecrated on 29 July 1856.

A fire badly damaged the church in 1972. Services went on after temporary repairs. The present building was finished in 1978 and opened by Patriarch Shnork Kalustyan. It was repaired again in 2003 and 2012.

=== The cemetery ===
Nobody knows exactly when the cemetery was founded. The Patriarchate estimates it has been in use since the 18th century and Kültür Envanteri dates it to the same century. The foundation's burial registers go back to 1866.

The Hrant Dink Foundation gave the Rumelihisarı foundation its own section in 2012 Declaration, its study of the property problems of Armenian foundations in Istanbul. The book also maps the foundation's properties in the neighbourhood. The same study identified 31 Armenian cemeteries in the city. Only a third of them are still used as cemeteries. The rest were turned over to other uses or disappeared entirely.

== Present day ==
Besides the cemetery, the foundation owns a former school building and 12 other properties. Its board changed after the foundation election of 4 December 2022. In a report published in December 2024, the new board said it had taken over the cemetery in a neglected state. According to the report, the caretaker had not been paid and had started keeping cattle in the cemetery to earn an income. No maintenance fees had been collected for the graves either. The former board's chair rejected these findings and said the matter had been turned into a personal feud.

The new board applied to the Istanbul Metropolitan Municipality to have the churchyard and cemetery cleaned and the trees pruned. The animals were removed and the caretaker was put back on a salary. All burial records kept since 1866 were digitised, and work began on identifying each grave and drawing up a site plan. Grave owners were asked for a one-off payment covering past upkeep and an annual fee from then on. The foundation also asked the municipality's cemeteries directorate to build footpaths, a toilet and a fountain.

According to Kültür Envanteri, visits to the cemetery require permission.

== See also ==
- Surp Santuht Church
- Şişli Armenian Cemetery
- Pangaltı Armenian Cemetery
- Aşiyan Asri Cemetery
- Armenians in Turkey
