= Pyrrhias Cyon =

Town of ancient Thrace

Coordinates: 41°05′17″N 29°02′58″E

Pyrrhias Cyon was a town of ancient Thrace, inhabited during Roman times.

Its site is located near Rumeli Hisar in European Turkey.
