= Rumelifeneri, Istanbul =

Rumelifeneri
- Neighbourhood
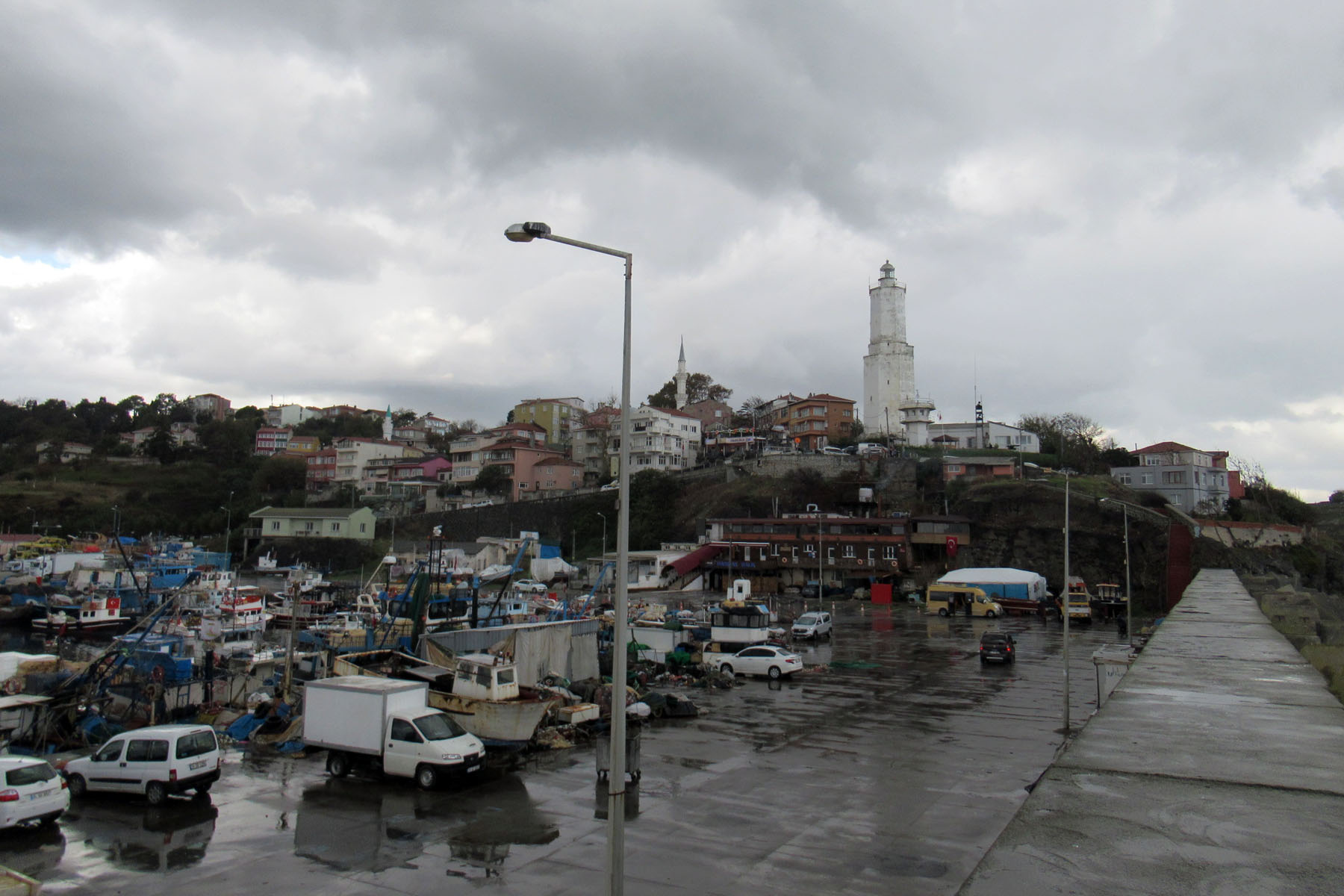

- Location within Turkey Location within Istanbul
- Coordinates: 41°14′N 29°07′E
- Country: Turkey
- Province: Istanbul
- District: Sarıyer
- Elevation: 30 m (98 ft)
- Population (2022): 4,337
- Time zone: UTC+3 (TRT)
- Postal code: 34450
- Area code: 0212

Rumelifeneri (named after the lighthouse Rumeli Feneri) is a neighbourhood in the municipality and district of Sarıyer, Istanbul Province, Turkey. Its population is 4,337 (2022).

== Geography ==
Rumelifeneri is a coastal village located at the extreme northwest (i.e., European side) of the Bosphorous Strait. It is a suburb of Istanbul. The distance to Sarıyer is 10 kilometres (6.2 mi) and to the center of Greater Istanbul is about 25 kilometres (16 mi).

== History ==
Archaeological evidence in the area of the village dates back to the late Byzantine era, although a now lost Greek inscription dating to the 3rd century CE was formerly on display at the Greek cemetery of the village.

The village is named after a local lighthouse, which is attested in portolans and literary sources since at least the 15th century. Petrus Gyllius, who visited it in the mid-16th century, described it as octagonal, and ascribed to it a Byzantine origin. Its Greek inhabitants named it Phanarion (Φανάριον, "lighthouse"), often in the diminutive Phanarakion (Φαναράκιον). In 1768, Rumeli Feneri Fort was built by a Greek engineer for the Ottoman Empire, possibly on older foundations. It is now in ruins. Rumelifeneri was involved was the rebellion of Kabakçı Mustafa.

Before World War I, the village was inhabited by Greeks—some 900 inhabitants in the late 19th century—and had a church dedicated to St. George (possibly built on a Byzantine predecessor), and the hagiasma (sacred well) known as tis Tsirpinas (της Τσίρπινας).

== Economy ==
Rumelifeneri is a fishermen's village. But it is very close to Istanbul, which makes the village a place of seafood restaurants specialized for daily excursion of Istanbul citizens.

== See also ==
- Rumelihisarı, Sarıyer
  - Rumelihisarı
- Rumelikavağı
- Rumelifeneri, Istanbul
  - Rumeli Feneri

- Anadoluhisarı, Beykoz
  - Anadoluhisarı
- Anadolukavağı
- Anadolufeneri, Beykoz
  - Anadolu Feneri
