= Anadoluhisarı, Beykoz =

Anadoluhisarı
- Neighbourhood
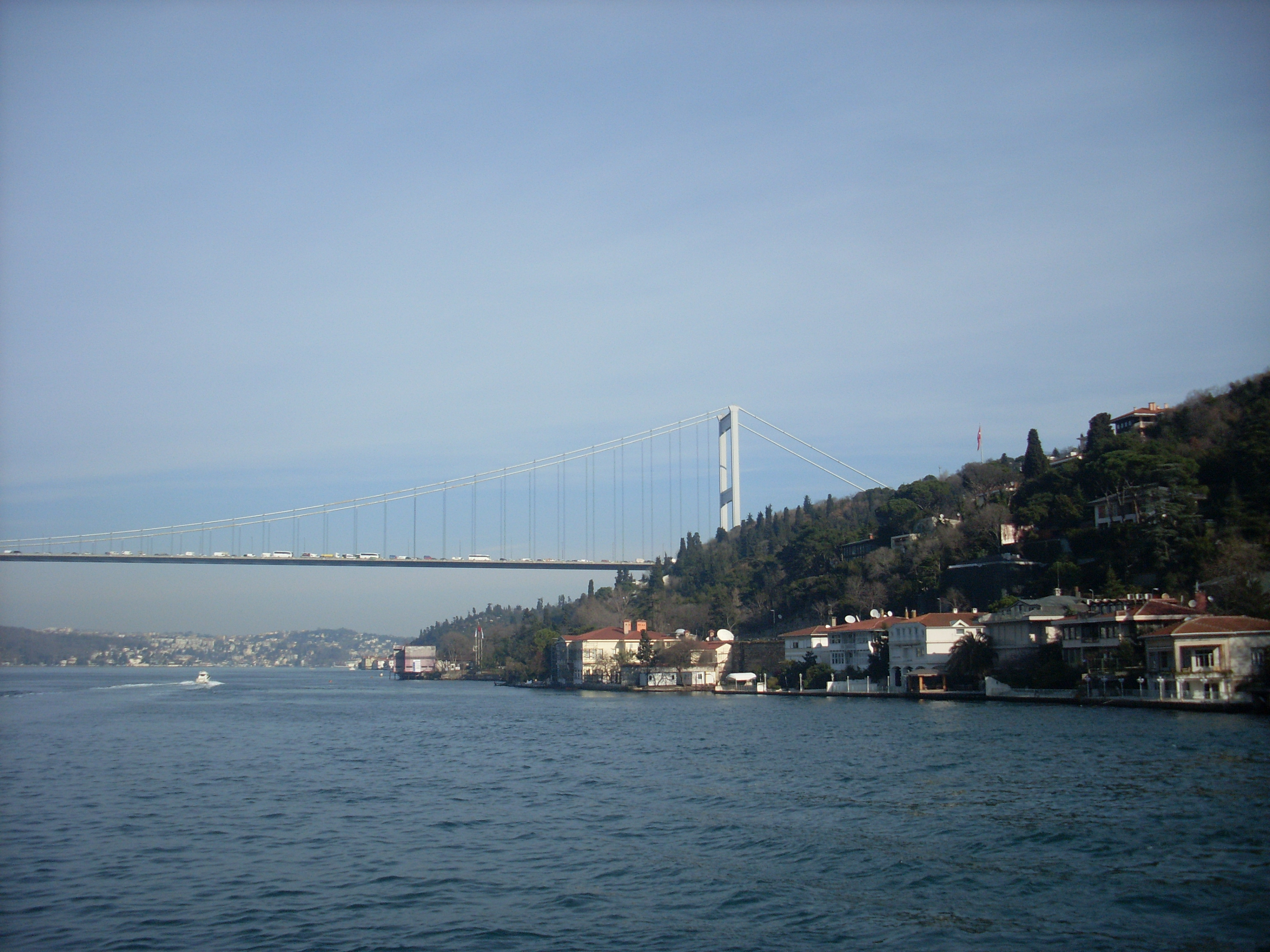
- A view of the shores of Anadoluhisarı with Fatih Sultan Mehmet Bridge in the background

- Location within Turkey Location within Istanbul
- Coordinates: 41°05′11″N 29°04′17″E
- Country: Turkey
- Province: Istanbul
- District: Beykoz
- Population (2025): 2,474
- Time zone: UTC+3 (TRT)

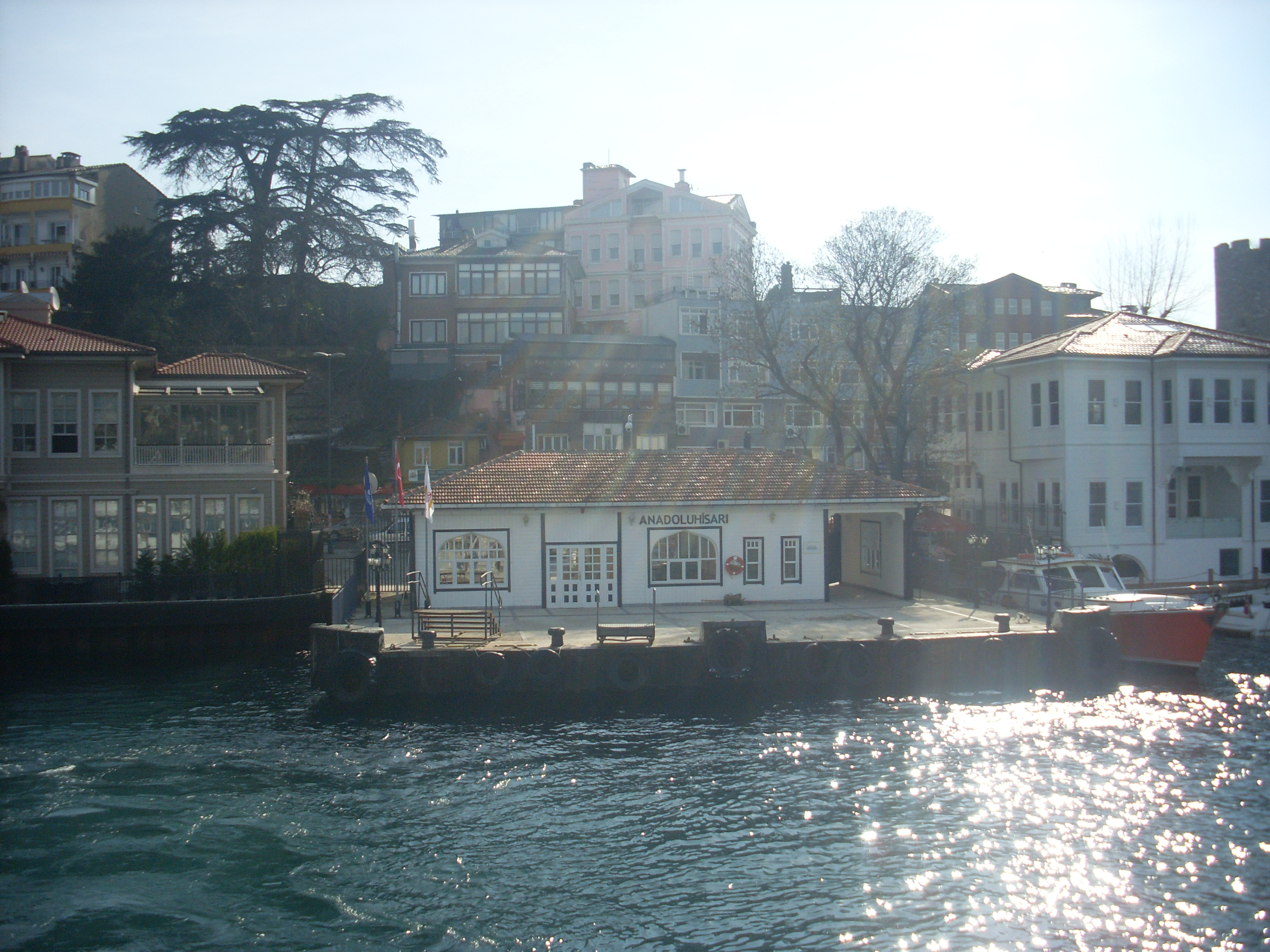
The port of Anadoluhisarı

Anadoluhisarı is a neighbourhood in the municipality and district of Beykoz, Istanbul Province, Turkey. Its population is 2,474 (2025). It is on the coast of the Bosporus Strait. It takes its name from Anadolu Hisarı fortress, built by Ottoman Sultan Bayezid the Thunderbolt in 1395 CE in preparation for the Conquest of Constantinople. Rumeli Hisarı fortress lies on the opposite shore. Kanlıca and the Fatih Sultan Mehmet Bridge lie to the north and Kandilli to the south.

Goksu Stream flows into the Strait right next to the fortress. The old meadow area between Göksu Stream and Küçüksu Stream flowing into the sea in the south is called Küçüksu Meadow. A landmark of the area is Küçüksu Pavilion, commissioned by Sultan Abdulmejid I and designed by Nikoğos Balyan. Right next to the pavilion is the Mihrişah Valide Sultan Fountain, also known as the Küçüksu Fountain.

Among the important buildings of Anadoluhisarı are Amcazade Mansion and Zarif Mustafa Pasha Mansion.

== See also ==
- Rumelihisarı, Sarıyer
  - Rumelihisarı
- Rumelikavağı
- Rumelifeneri, Istanbul
  - Rumeli Feneri
- Anadoluhisarı, Beykoz
  - Anadoluhisarı
- Anadolukavağı
- Anadolufeneri, Beykoz
  - Anadolu Feneri
