= Rumeli Feneri =

Lighthouse in Istanbul, Turkey

Rumeli Feneri Türkeli Feneri
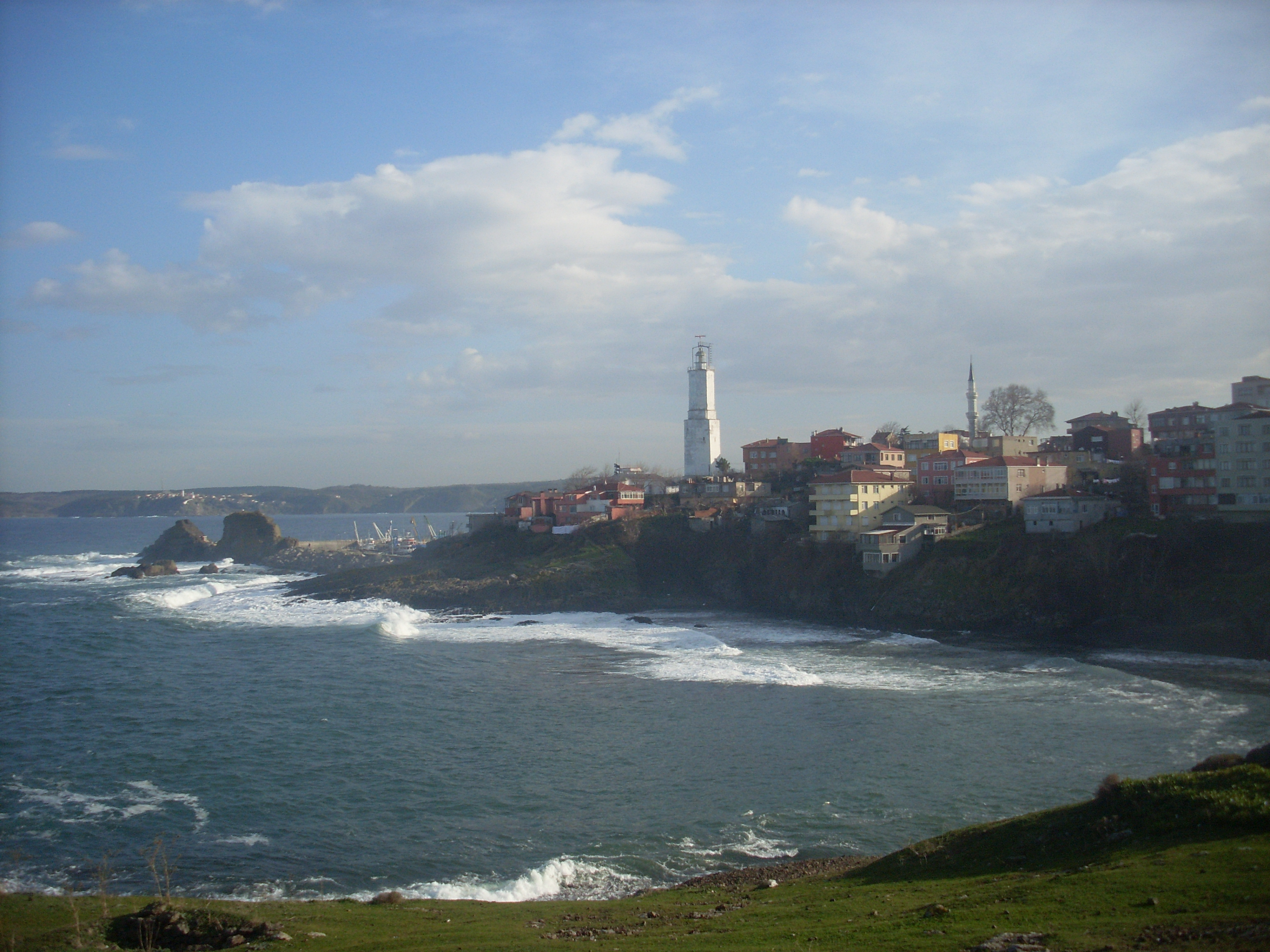
- Location: Rumelifeneri; Sarıyer; Istanbul Province; Turkey
- Coordinates: 41°14′03.3″N 29°06′43.5″E

Tower
- Constructed: 1830 (first)
- Construction: stone tower
- Height: 30 m (98 ft)
- Shape: two-stage octagonal tower with balcony and lantern
- Markings: white tower and lantern
- Operator: Directorate General of Coastal Safety

Light
- First lit: 1856 (current)
- Focal height: 58 m (190 ft)
- Range: 18 nmi (33 km)
- Characteristic: Fl (2) W 12s.

Rumeli Feneri, also Türkeli Feneri, a historical lighthouse still in use, is located on the European side of the Bosporus Strait's Black Sea entrance in Istanbul.

== Etymology ==
Rumeli (or Rumelia) is a former name for the Ottoman territories west of the Bosporus Strait. The lighthouse is named for it because of Anadolu Feneri, a lighthouse parallel to it on the eastern side of the Bosporus Strait.

== Overview ==
Rumeli Feneri is across from the Anadolu Feneri lighthouse, which is on the Anatolian side of the strait at a distance of 2 nmi (3.7 km). In the Greek myth of Jason and the Golden Fleece, the two islets these lighthouses were built were called the Symplegades. They became a gang, destroying any ship which passed between them. A line connecting the two lighthouses marks the northern boundary of the Port of Istanbul. The lighthouse town is Rumelifeneri, which today is a fishermen's village in Sarıyer district.

The lighthouse was built by the French in order to provide safe navigation for the French and British war ships entering and exiting the Black Sea during the Crimean War (1853–1856). The lighthouse went into service on 15 May 1856, together with its Anatolian counterpart. It was operated by the French until 1933 when the 100-year concession was cancelled and the Turkish authorities took over. Today, it is maintained by the Coastal Safety Authority (Turkish: Kıyı Emniyeti Genel Müdürlüğü) of the Ministry of Transport and Communication.

The lighthouse is situated on a hillside 58 m (190 ft) high above the sea level and has a height of 30 m (98 ft). It is the tallest lighthouse in Turkey. The tower has the form of a two-staged octagonal prism. Initially, it was lit by kerosene that was later replaced by Dalén light using carbide (acetylene gas). Today, the light source is electricity; a butane gas lighting system is also installed for backup purposes. The Fresnel lens with 500 mm (1.6 ft) focal length allows the white light that group flashes every 12 seconds, a range of 18 nmi (33 km).

The lighthouse is listed in Turkey under the code "TUR-053" and its radio call sign is TC1RLH.

Rumeli Feneri is open to the public as a historical site.

A Muslim saint by the name of Sarı Saltuk has a tomb inside the lighthouse.

== See also ==
- List of lighthouses in Turkey

- Rumelihisarı, Sarıyer
  - Rumelihisarı
- Rumelikavağı
- Rumelifeneri, Istanbul
  - Rumeli Feneri
- Anadoluhisarı, Beykoz
  - Anadoluhisarı
- Anadolukavağı
- Anadolufeneri, Beykoz
  - Anadolu Feneri

== Notes ==
- Tutel, Eser (1993). "Rumeli Feneri". Istanbul ansiklopedisi: dünden bügüne (in Turkish). Vol. 6. Kültür Bakanlığı/Tarih Vakfı. p. 354. ISBN 975-7306-00-2.
