= Anadolu Feneri =

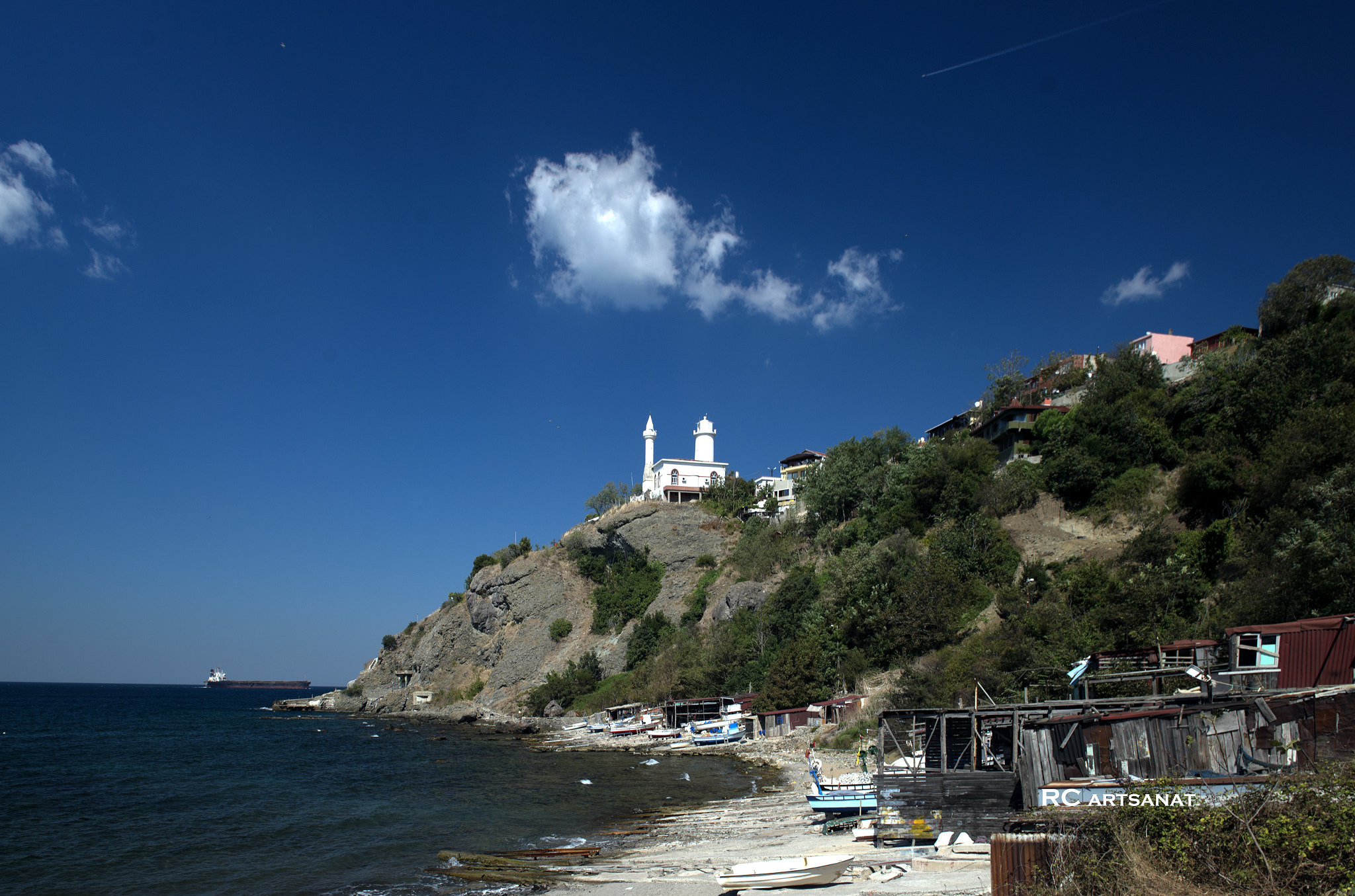
- Location: Anadolufeneri; Beykoz; Istanbul Province; Turkey
- Coordinates: 41°13′02.9″N 29°09′07.7″E

Tower
- Constructed: 1830 (first)
- Construction: masonry
- Height: 19 m (62 ft)
- Shape: cylindrical tower with balcony and lantern
- Markings: white tower and lantern
- Operator: Directorate General of Coastal Safety
- Racon: B

Light
- First lit: 1856 (current)
- Focal height: 75 m (246 ft)
- Range: 20 nmi (37 km; 23 mi)
- Characteristic: Fl W 20s.

Anadolu Feneri is a historical lighthouse still in use, located at Anadolufeneri on the Asian side of Bosphorus' Black Sea entrance in Istanbul, Turkey. "Anadolu" is the Turkish name for Anatolia and "fener" means lighthouse. It is across from the lighthouse Rumeli Feneri, on the European side of the strait at a distance of 2 nmi (3.7 km; 2.3 mi). A connecting line between the two lighthouses marks the northern boundary of the Port of Istanbul. Today the town is a fishermen's village in Beykoz district.

== History ==
François Baron de Tott, a French engineer and military officer of Hungarian origin, who lived some years in Istanbul, reported on the existence of a lighthouse at this location in 1755. During the Crimean War (1853–1856), it became necessary to have lighthouses on both sides of the Black Sea entrance of Bosporus to provide safe navigation for the French and British war ships. The French constructed Rumeli Feneri on the opposite side of the strait and improved the existing lighthouse Anadolu Feneri. Both lighthouses went in service on May 15, 1856. Anadolu Feneri was operated by the French until 1933 when the 100-years concession was cancelled and the Turkish authorities took over. Today, it is maintained by the Coastal Safety Authority (Turkish: Kıyı Emniyeti Genel Müdürlüğü) of the Ministry of Transport and Communication.

The lighthouse is situated on Yum Burnu or Yon (Hrom) Point 75 m (246 ft) high above the sea level and the entirely white painted tower has a height of 19 m (62 ft). The masonry built tower with a gallery around the lantern room has a conical form. A two-story keeper's house is attached to the tower. Initially, it was lit by kerosene that was later replaced by Dalén light using carbide (acetylene gas). Today, the light source is electricity, however, a butane gas lighting system is also installed for backup purposes. The lighthouse's lantern flashes every 20 seconds and its light is visible at a range of 20 nmi (37 km; 23 mi).

The lighthouse is listed in Turkey under the code "TUR 014" and its radio call sign is TC2ALH.

Anadolu Feneri, inhabited by a family, is open to public visit as a historical site.

== See also ==
- List of lighthouses in Turkey

- Rumelihisarı, Sarıyer
  - Rumelihisarı
- Rumelikavağı
- Rumelifeneri, Istanbul
  - Rumeli Feneri
- Anadoluhisarı, Beykoz
  - Anadoluhisarı
- Anadolukavağı
- Anadolufeneri, Beykoz
  - Anadolu Feneri
