= Anadoluhisarı =

Fortress in Istanbul, Turkey

- Anadoluhisarı, Istanbul, Turkey
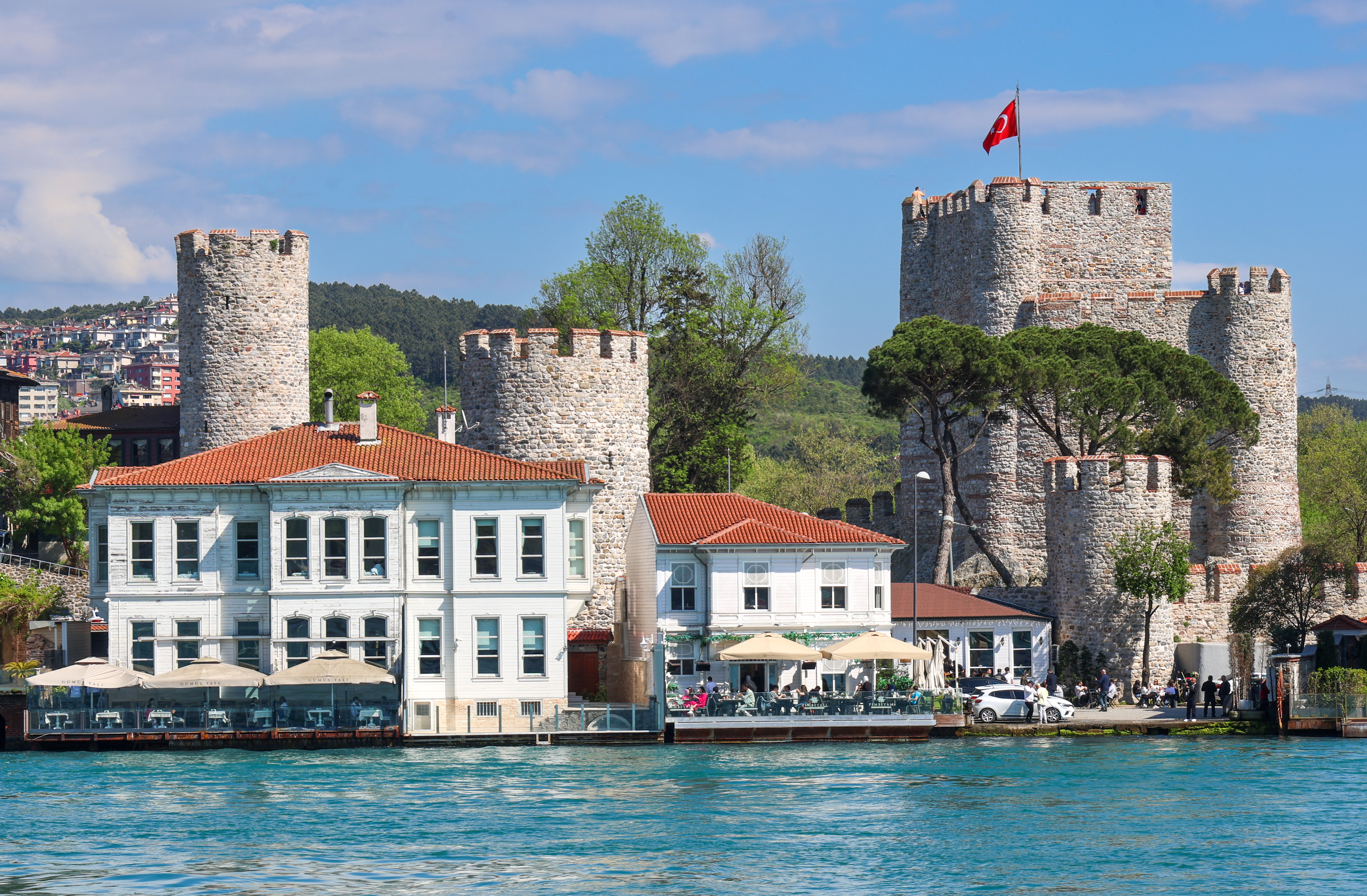
- Anadoluhisarı as seen from the Bosphorus

Site information
- Type: Fortress

Location
- Coordinates: 41.081944°N 29.066944°E

Site history
- Built: 1394
- Built by: Bayezid I

Anadoluhisarı (English: Anatolian Fortress), known historically as Güzelce Hisar ("the Beauteous Fortress") is a medieval Ottoman fortress located in Istanbul, Turkey on the Anatolian (Asian) side of the Bosporus. The complex is the oldest surviving Turkish architectural structure built in Istanbul, and further gives its name to the neighborhood around it in the city's Beykoz district.

== History ==
Anadoluhisarı was built between 1393 and 1394 on the commission of the Ottoman Sultan Bayezid I, as part of his preparations for a siege of the then-Byzantine city of Constantinople.

Constructed on an area of 7,000 square metres (1.7 acres), the fortress is situated at the narrowmost point of the Bosporus, where the strait is a mere 660 meters (2,170 ft) wide. The site is bound by Göksu (Ancient Greek: Aretòs) creek to the south, and was previously home to the ruins of a Roman temple dedicated to Uranus. Erected primarily as a watch fort, the citadel has a 25 meters (82 ft) tall, quadratic main tower within the walls of an irregular pentagon, with five watchtowers at the corners.

Constantinople was blockaded from 1394 on, but Bayezid's campaign was first interrupted by the Crusade of Nicopolis, and then ended with his defeat at the Battle of Ankara. An 11-year civil war followed, which ended with the ascent of his son Mehmed I to the throne. Mehmed’s grandson, Sultan Mehmed II reinforced the fortress with a two-meter-thick wall and three additional watchtowers, and added further extensions, including a warehouse and living quarters. As part of his plans to launch a renewed military campaign to conquer Constantinople, Mehmed II further built a sister structure to Anadoluhisarı across the Bosphorus called Rumelihisarı. The two fortresses worked in tandem in 1453 to throttle all maritime traffic along the Bosphorus, thus helping the Ottomans achieve their goal of making the city of Constantinople (later renamed Istanbul) their new imperial capital.

After the Ottoman conquest of the city, Anadoluhisarı served as a customs house and military prison, and after several centuries, fell into disrepair.

After the fall of the Ottomans and the 1923 establishment of the Republic of Turkey, the newly created Turkish Ministry of Culture tended to and ultimately restored the site in 1991–1993. Today, Anadoluhisarı lends a picturesque appearance to its corner of the Bosphorus alongside the timber yalı homes that define the neighborhood, and functions as a historical site, although it is not open to the public. The latest restoration was conducted by Istanbul Metropolitan Municipality which started in 2021.

== Gallery ==
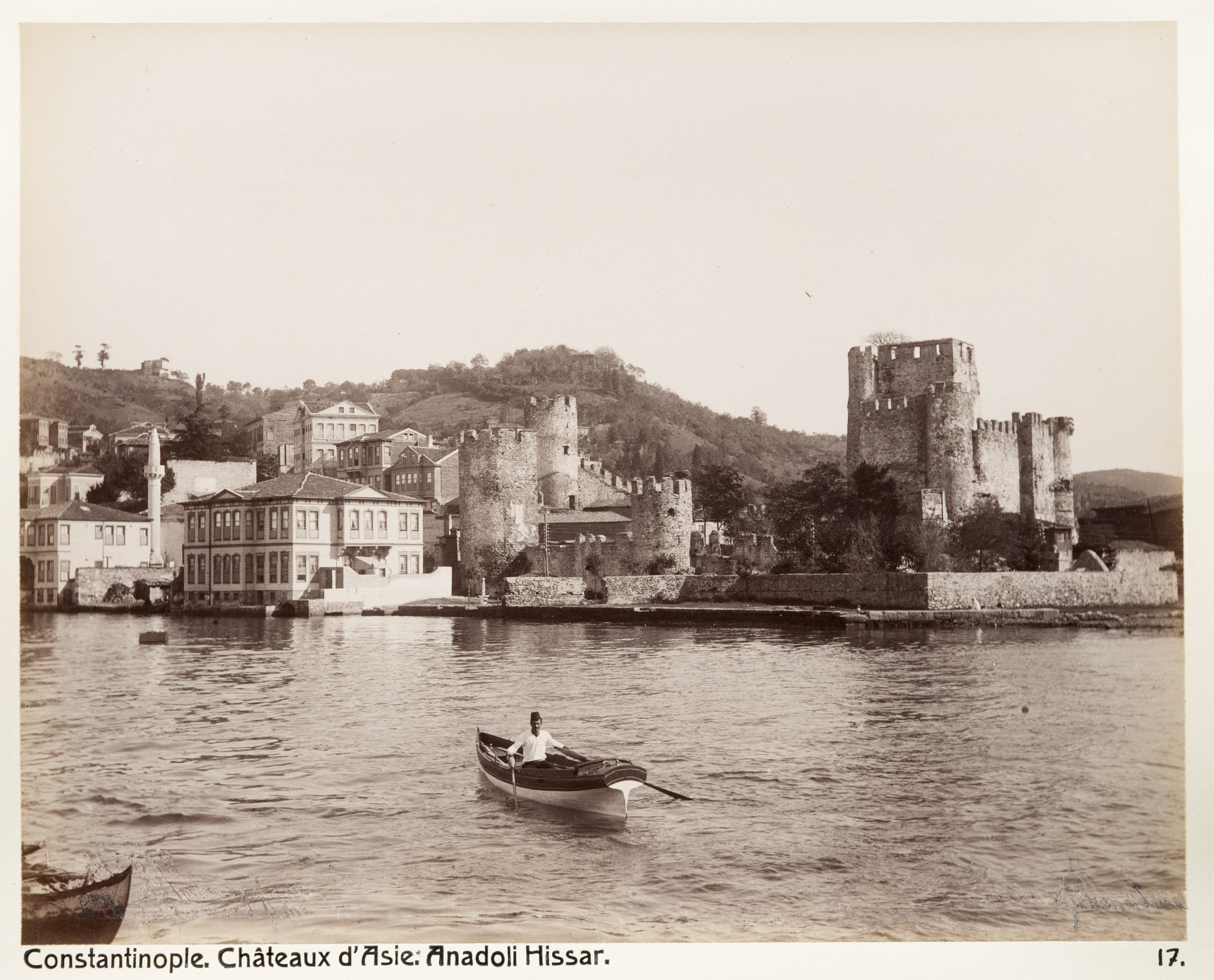
Anadoluhisarı from a postcard dated 1901

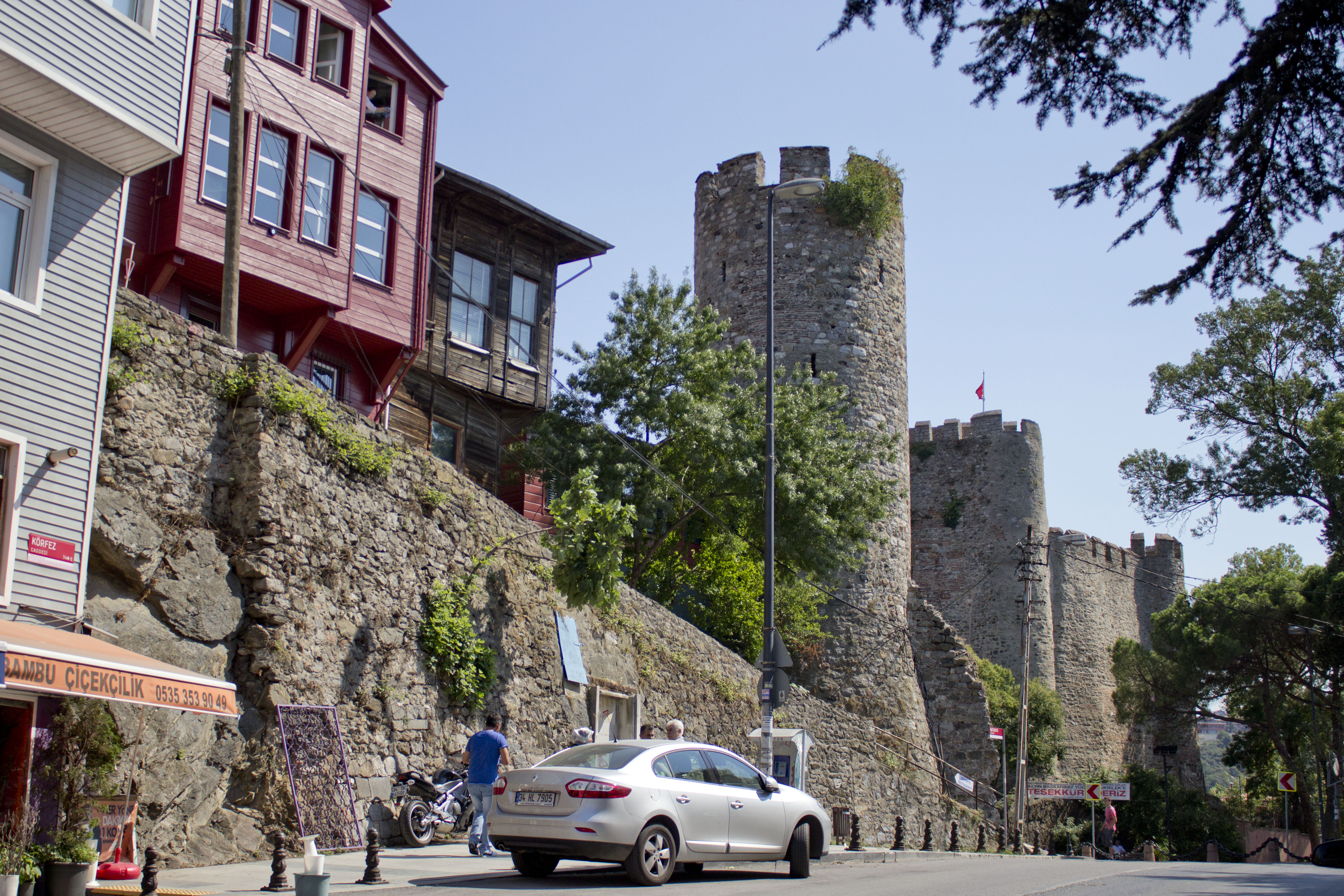
Local street view of the neighborhood of the same name

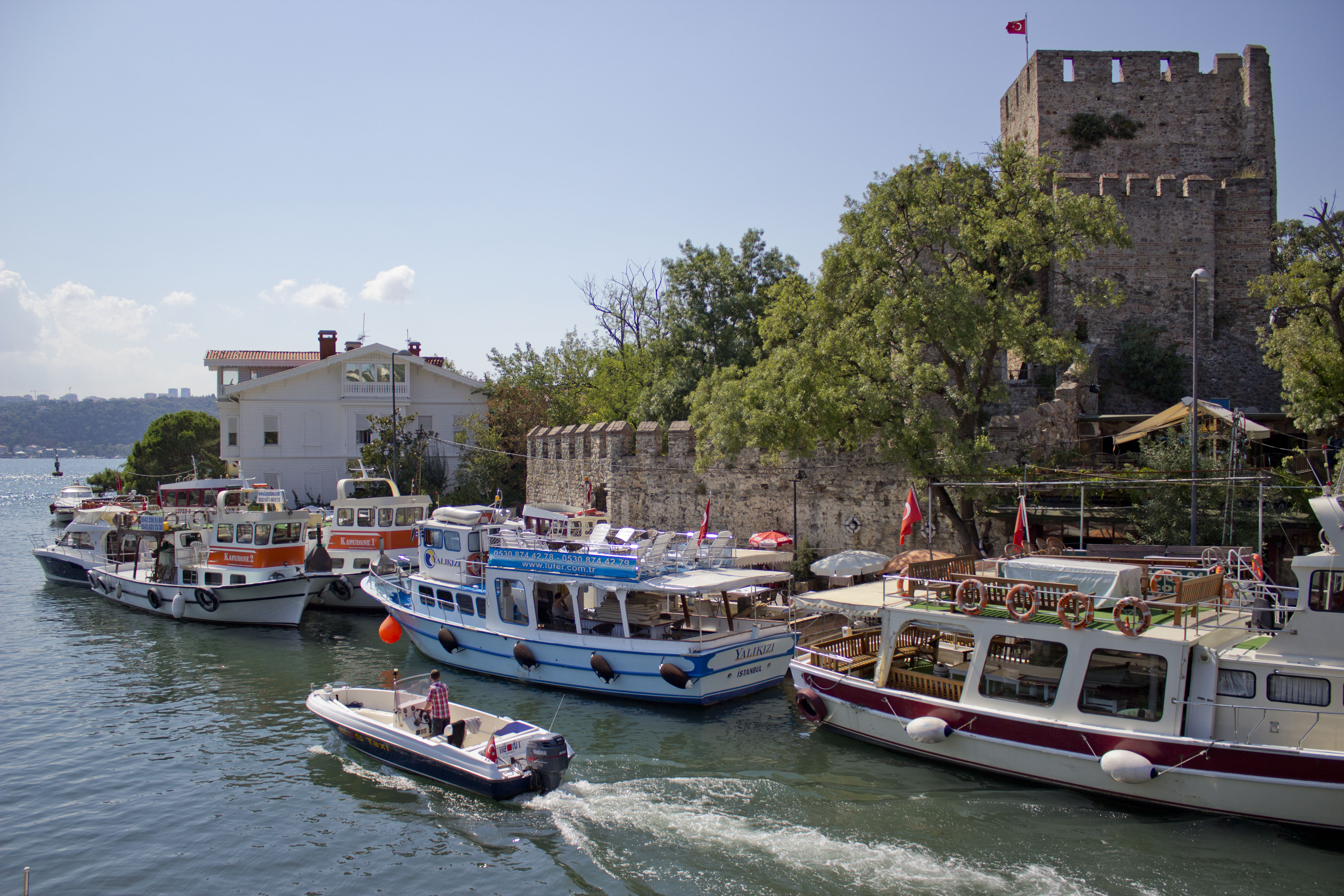
The castle as seen from the coast

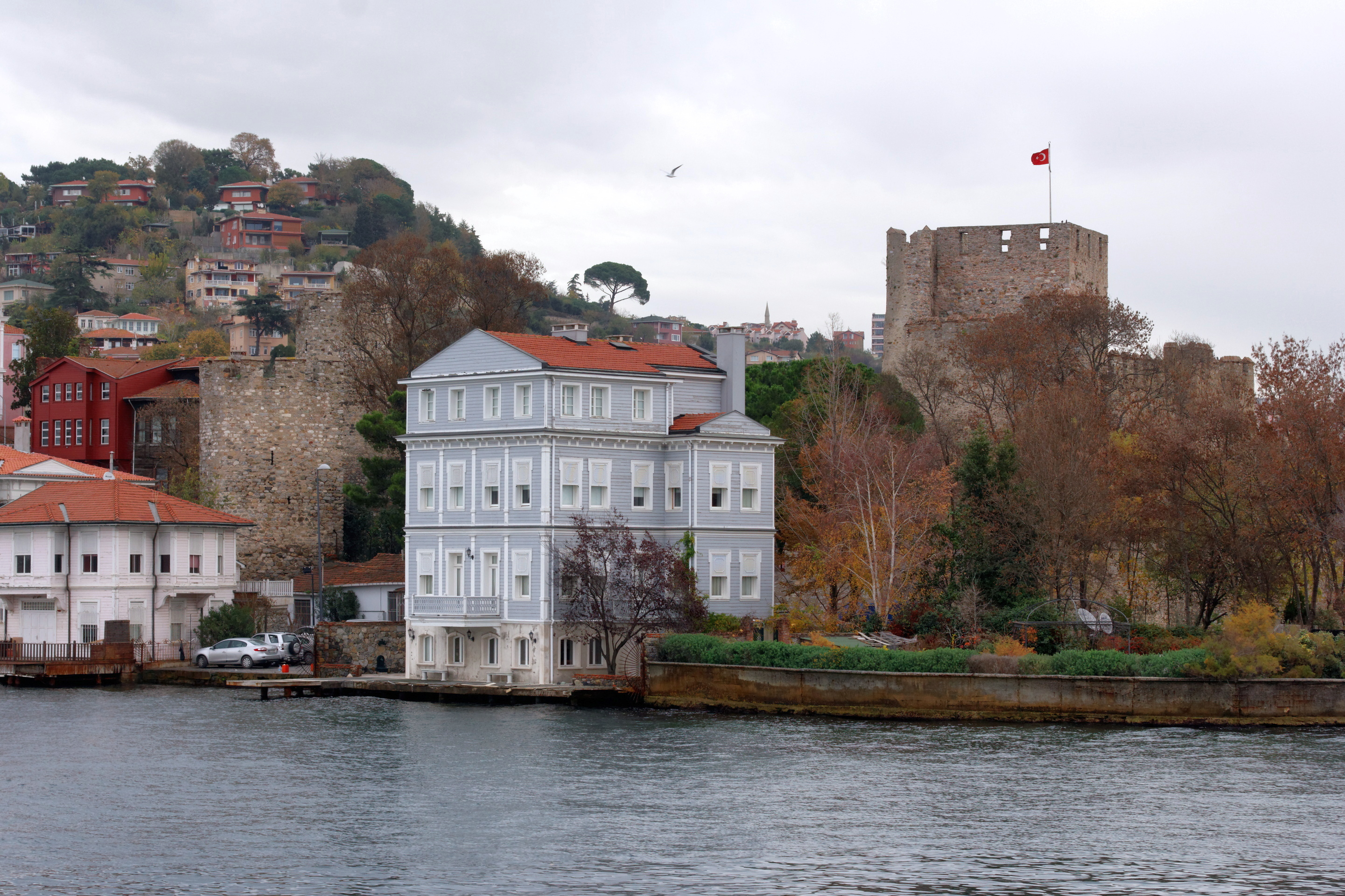
The castle amidst the traditional Istanbul waterside mansions known as yalı

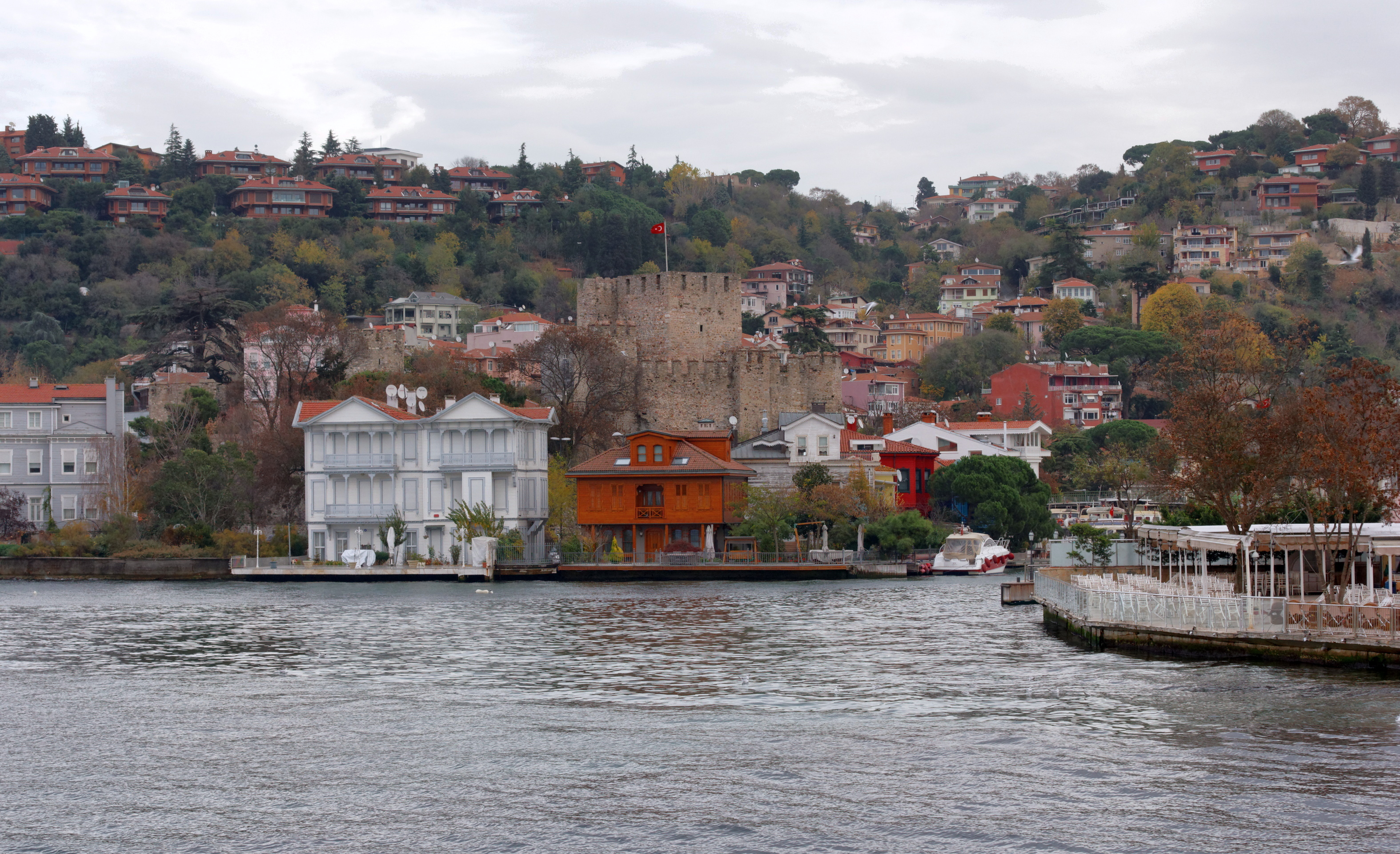
Anadoluhisarı as seen from Bosphorus strait

== See also ==
- Yedikule Fortress
- Conquest of Constantinople
- Ottoman architecture

- Rumelihisarı, Sarıyer
  - Rumelihisarı
- Rumelikavağı
- Rumelifeneri, Istanbul
  - Rumeli Feneri
- Anadoluhisarı, Beykoz
  - Anadoluhisarı
- Anadolukavağı
- Anadolufeneri, Beykoz
  - Anadolu Feneri

== Notes ==
- Architectural Museum (in Turkish)
- Principals of Ottoman fort architecture (in Turkish)
