= Rumelikavağı =

- Neighbourhood
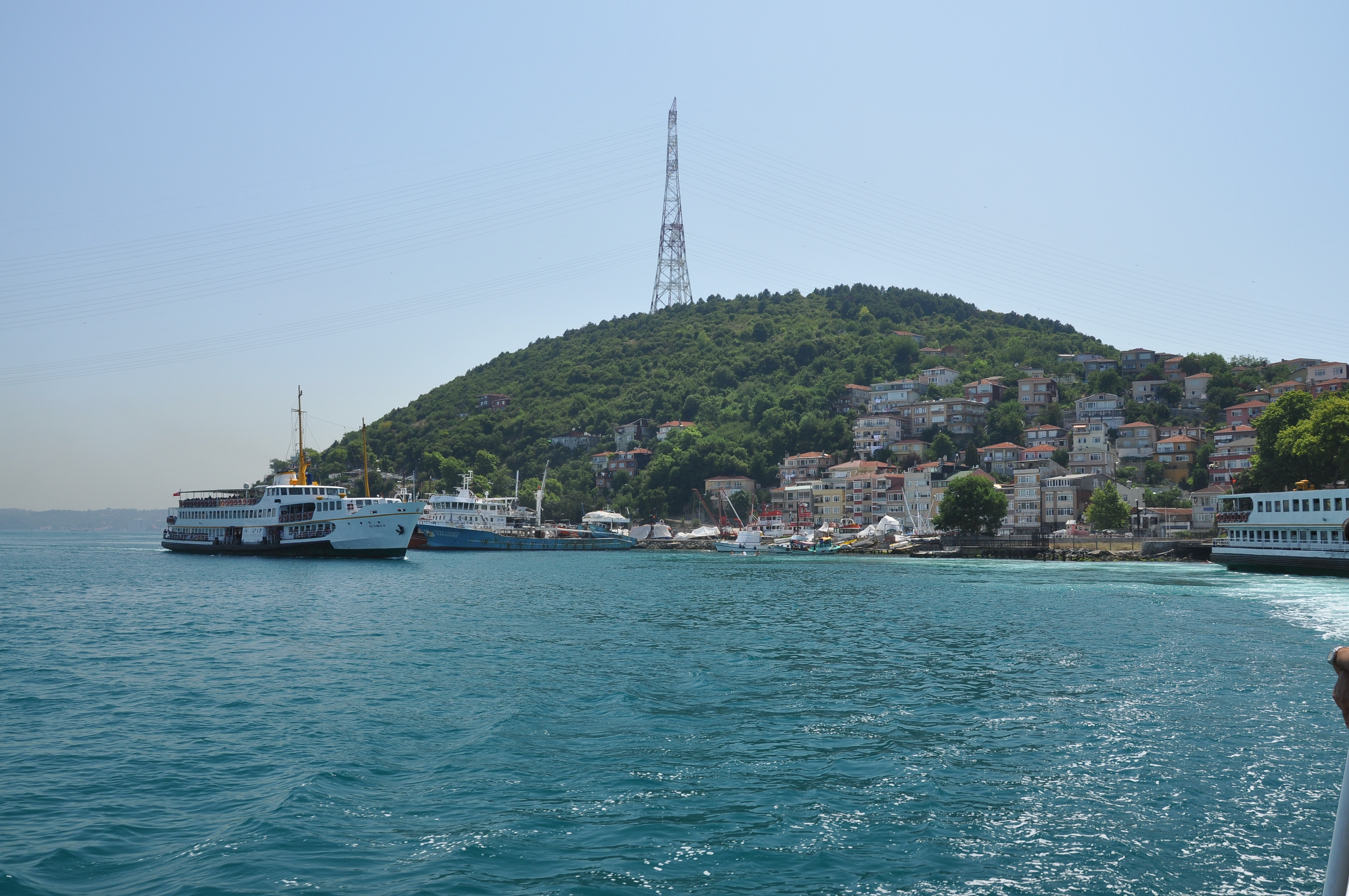
- A view of the Rumelikavağı skyline from the Bosphorus

- Location within Turkey Location within Istanbul
- Coordinates: 41°10′54″N 29°4′30″E
- Country: Turkey
- Province: Istanbul
- District: Sarıyer
- Population (2022): 3,657
- Time zone: UTC+3 (TRT)
- Postal code: 34450
- Area code: 0212

Rumelikavağı, also known as Rumeli Kavağı, is a neighbourhood in the municipality and district of Sarıyer, Istanbul Province, Turkey. Its population is 3,657 (2022). "Rumeli" is the Turkish name for Thrace, and "Kavak" means "control post" in Ottoman Turkish referring to the strategic position of the location on the Bosporus. The ferry pier which is the center of the neighborhood is at 41°10′54″N 29°04′30″E.

Formerly, it was a small fishing village. In the 17th century, a castle was built to check Cossack naval assaults from the Black Sea. In 1877, during the Russo-Turkish War (1877-1878), a part of the immigrants from the Russian occupied provinces settled in Rumelikavağı. Up until the 1960s, most of Rumelikavağı was a restricted zone by military.

There are many places of interest in Rumelikavağı, such as ruins of medieval castles, mosques, churches, fountains, hamams etc. The Yavuz Sultan Selim Bridge over the Bosphorus is to the north of the neighborhood.

== See also ==
- Rumelihisarı, Sarıyer
  - Rumelihisarı
- Rumelikavağı
- Rumelifeneri, Istanbul
  - Rumeli Feneri

- Anadoluhisarı, Beykoz
  - Anadoluhisarı
- Anadolukavağı
- Anadolufeneri, Beykoz
  - Anadolu Feneri
