= Anadolukavağı =

- Neighbourhood
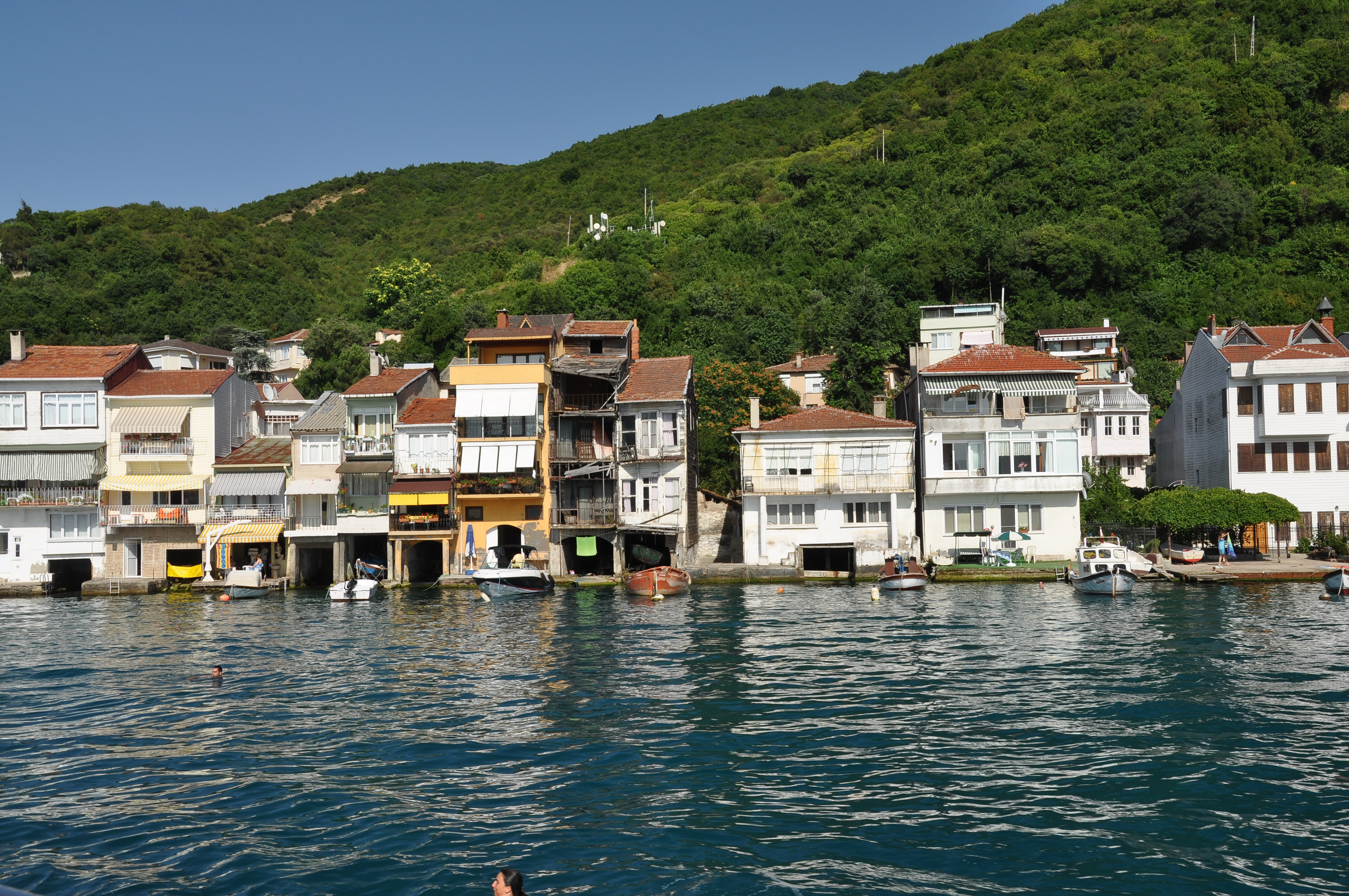
- Anadolukavağı from the Bosphorus

- Location within Turkey Location within Istanbul
- Coordinates: 41°10′28″N 29°05′22″E
- Country: Turkey
- Province: Istanbul
- District: Beykoz
- Population (2022): 1,517
- Time zone: UTC+3 (TRT)
- Postal code: 34825
- Area code: 0216

Anadolukavağı (sometimes written as Anadolu Kavağı) is a neighbourhood in the municipality and district of Beykoz, Istanbul Province, Turkey. Its population is 1,517 (2022). It is at the northern end of the Bosphorus. "Anadolu" is the Turkish name for Anatolia, and "kavak" meant "control post" in Ottoman Turkish, suggesting the strategic importance of its location. It is directly across from Rumeli Kavağı, the Greek or European control post on the other side of the Bosphorus.

Anadolu Kavağı was originally called Hieron (Ancient Greek: ἱερόν) and was an important outpost for the Romans and the Byzantines.

It has been suggested that in the past some villagers acted as 'wreckers', lighting fires to disorient ships and ground them in the narrow Strait so that they could seize their cargo. Others claim that Anadolu Kavağı served as a refuge where trade ships could shelter from storms.

Once a fishing village, it retains a village atmosphere and has many fish restaurants offering lunches for passengers on the longer Bosphorus cruises which usually terminate here.

Although there are few permanent residents, the military personnel at surrounding bases contribute to a total population of about 1,500.

The village's most prominent historic structures are a small mosque commissioned by Ali Pasha of Midilli (Lesbos) in 1593, and a fountain commissioned by Cevriye Hatun in 1785.

Ruinous Yoros Castle, an old Genoese fortress, stands on the hill above Anadolu Kavağı. From its walls there are fine views out towards the Third Bosphorus Bridge and the Black Sea.

Şehir Hatları, the city ferry company, offers sailings to and from Üsküdar and points in between. The twice-daily long Bosphorus ferry services leave Eminönü for Anadolu Kavağı, calling in at points en route including Sarıyer and Rumeli Kavağı on the European shore of the Bosphorus. The village is also served by an hourly bus service from Üsküdar.

== See also ==
- Rumelihisarı, Sarıyer
  - Rumelihisarı
- Rumelikavağı
- Rumelifeneri, Istanbul
  - Rumeli Feneri
- Anadoluhisarı, Beykoz
  - Anadoluhisarı
- Anadolukavağı
- Anadolufeneri, Beykoz
  - Anadolu Feneri
