= Rumelihisarı, Sarıyer =

Neighbourhood in Istanbul, Turkey

Rumelihisarı
- Neighbourhood
- Location within Turkey Location within Istanbul
- Coordinates: 41°5′18″N 29°2′58″E
- Country: Turkey
- Province: Istanbul
- District: Sarıyer
- Population (2022): 10,073
- Time zone: UTC+3 (TRT)

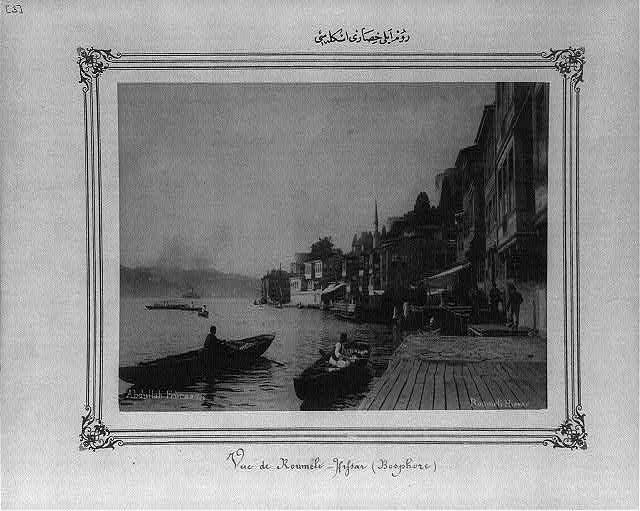
The port of Rumeli Hisarı (1880–1893)

Rumelihisarı is a neighbourhood in the municipality and district of Sarıyer, Istanbul Province, Turkey. Its population is 10,073 (2022). It is on the European side of Istanbul. The neighbourhood is famous for and named after its medieval fortress, Rumelihisarı, built by Mehmed the Conqueror between 1451 and 1452.

The neighbourhood is bordered by Baltalimanı to the north, Fatih Sultan Mehmet to the northwest, Etiler in Beşiktaş district to the west, Bebek, also in Beşiktaş, to the south, and the Bosphorus to the east.

The Rumelihisarı Armenian Cemetery, an Armenian Apostolic burial ground thought to date from the 18th century, lies on the hill above the old village, in the area known as Hisarüstü. It belongs to the foundation of the neighbourhood's Surp Santuht Armenian Church.

== See also ==
- Rumelihisarı
- Rumelikavağı
- Rumelifeneri, Istanbul
  - Rumeli Feneri
- Anadoluhisarı, Beykoz
  - Anadoluhisarı
- Anadolukavağı
- Anadolufeneri, Beykoz
  - Anadolu Feneri
