= List of municipalities in Yalova Province =

This is the List of municipalities in Yalova Province, Turkey, as of March 2023.

District	Municipality
Altınova	Altınova
Altınova	Kaytazdere
Altınova	Subaşı
Altınova	Tavşanlı
Armutlu	Armutlu
Çiftlikköy	Çiftlikköy
Çiftlikköy	Taşköprü
Çınarcık	Çınarcık
Çınarcık	Esenköy
Çınarcık	Koru
Çınarcık	Teşvikiye
Termal	Termal
Yalova	Kadıköy
Yalova	Yalova
