= List of populated places in Yalova Province =

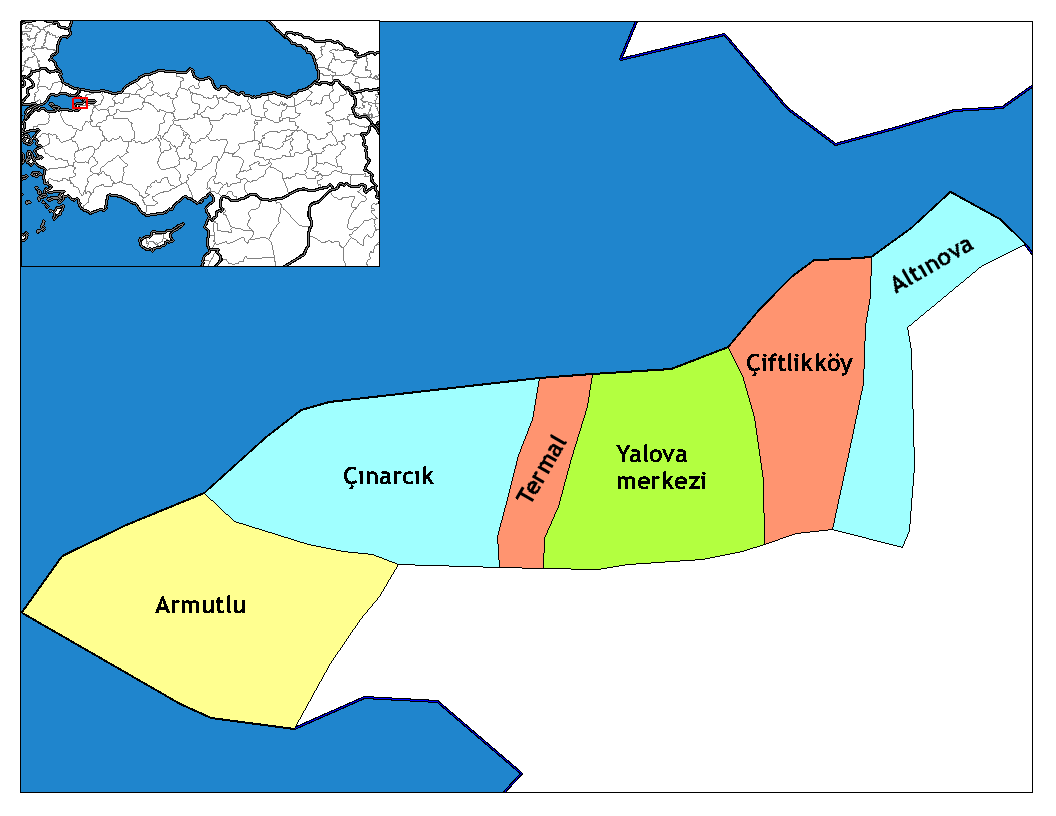
Yalova Province

Below is the list of populated places in Yalova Province, Turkey by the districts. In the following lists first place in each list is the administrative center of the district.

== Yalova ==
- Yalova
- Elmalık, Yalova
- Esadiye, Yalova
- Güneyköy, Yalova
- Hacımehmet, Yalova
- Kadıköy, Yalova
- Kazımiye, Yalova
- Kirazlı, Yalova
- Kurtköy, Yalova
- Safran, Yalova
- Samanlı, Yalova
- Soğucak, Yalova
- Sugören, Yalova

== Altınova ==
- Altınova
- Ahmediye, Altınova
- Aktoprak, Altınova
- Çavuşçiftliği, Altınova
- Fevziye, Altınova
- Geyikdere, Altınova
- Havuzdere, Altınova
- Hersek, Altınova
- Karadere, Altınova
- Kaytazdere, Altınova
- Örencik, Altınova
- Sermayecik, Altınova
- Soğuksu, Altınova
- Subaşı, Altınova
- Tavşanlı, Altınova
- Tevfikiye, Altınova
- Tokmak, Altınova

== Armutlu ==
- Armutlu
- Fıstıklı, Armutlu
- Hayriye, Armutlu
- Kapaklı, Armutlu
- Mecidiye, Armutlu
- Selimiye, Armutlu

== Çınarcık ==
- Çınarcık
- Çalıca, Çınarcık
- Esenköy, Çınarcık
- Kocadere, Çınarcık
- Koru, Çınarcık
- Ortaburun, Çınarcık
- Şenköy, Çınarcık
- Teşvikiye, Çınarcık

== Çiftlikköy ==
- Çiftlikköy
- Burhaniye, Çiftlikköy
- Çukurköy, Çiftlikköy
- Denizçalı, Çiftlikköy
- Dereköy, Çiftlikköy
- Gacık, Çiftlikköy
- İlyasköy, Çiftlikköy
- Kabaklı, Çiftlikköy
- Kılıç, Çiftlikköy
- Laledere, Çiftlikköy
- Taşköprü, Çiftlikköy

== Termal ==
- Termal
- Akköy, Termal
- Yenimahalle, Termal
