= Otoyol 5 =

Highway in Turkey

O-5
- Kocaeli Gebze-Bursa-İzmir Otoyolu

Route information
- Part of E881
- Length: 407 km (253 mi)
- Existed: 2015–present

Major junctions
- North end: O-4 in Kocaeli, Gebze

- O-22 in Bursa

- South end: O-30 in İzmir

Location
- Country: Turkey
- Regions: Marmara, Aegean
- Provinces: Kocaeli Province, Yalova Province, Bursa Province, Balıkesir Province, Manisa Province, İzmir Province
- Major cities: Gebze, Bursa, Balıkesir, Akhisar, Turgutlu, İzmir

Highway system
- Highways in Turkey; Motorways; List; State Highways; List
← O-4	→ O-6

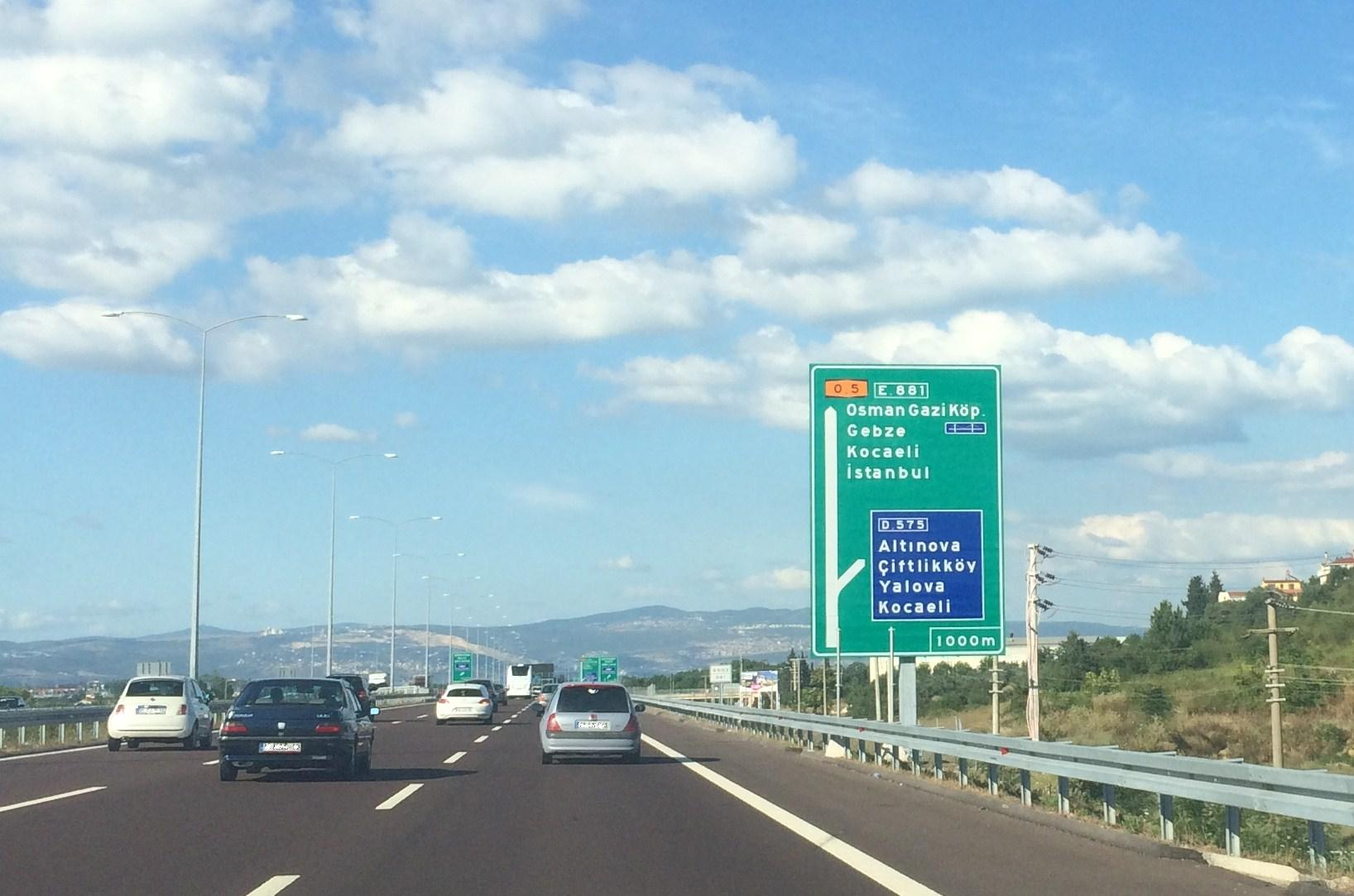
Otoyol 5 near Altınova exit

Otoyol 5 (English: Motorway 5), named the Kocaeli Gebze-Bursa-İzmir Motorway (Turkish: Kocaeli Gebze-Bursa-İzmir Otoyolu) and abbreviated as O-5, is a toll motorway in Turkey. Since being completed in 2019, it connects the Istanbul and Kocaeli metropolitan areas with İzmir, via Bursa and Balıkesir. The O-5 runs parallel to the D575 and the D565 for most of its length and is a major motorway in Turkey as it provides a direct connection between Kocaeli and its surrounding metropolis to the country's 3rd largest (İzmir) and 4th largest (Bursa) cities, bypassing the Gulf of İzmit via the Osman Gazi Bridge. The O-5 also makes up part of the International E-road network E881 thus making it one of the most extensive and expensive transport megaprojects.

The western part of the Bursa Beltway, which is part of the O-5, was completed during the 2000s. The rest of the O-5 has been under construction since the early 2010s, with the first portion opened from Altinova to Gemlik in April 2016. As of April 2017, the O-5 is open in two separate sections: the 105.5 km (65.6 mi) section from its northern terminus in Kocaeli, Gebze to Bursa, across the Osman Gazi Bridge along with a 18.2 km (11.3 mi) section from Kemalpaşa to its southern terminus in İzmir. The final section, Karacabey to Akhisar, opened on August 5, 2019.

The O-5 is the most expensive toll motorway in Turkey as the price for a personal vehicle from Kocaeli Gebze to Izmir 147 km (91 mi), ₺ 2.895 (US$ 60.44), including the Osman Gazi Bridge toll of ₺ 1.170 (US$ 24.43) (As 17.08.2026)

On the O-5, Starting from 3nd Kilometer (After the Osmangazi Bridge) they are "Service Areas" Called "Oksijen Facilities" all the way up to 375th km of the road. On These Service Areas/Facilities, various Gasoline company's (Like OPET, Shell, Lukoil, etc.), Electric Charge Stations (Like ZES And TruGo) Restaurants, Restrooms, Coffee Chain's (Like Kahve Dünyası) , Prayer facilities (Masjids) and Various Sports and Dress Chains are included for People's service.

== Kocaeli Gebze-Bursa-İzmir Motorway Project details ==
The project includes the Osman Gazi Bridge, the Kocaeli, Gebze-Bursa section and the Bursa-İzmir section of Otoyol 5. It is a build-operate-transfer project which was Awarded to a consortium consisting of 5 companies, Maintained by Otoyol A.Ş (Which Is consortium's operator company) (Nurol, Özaltın, Makyol, Göçay and Astaldi).

=== Key dates ===
- Tender: 9 April 2009
- Signing of contract: 27 September 2010
- Date of effect: 15 March 2013
- End of contract: 15 July 2035
- Construction time: 7 years

=== Guaranteed traffic volumes ===
- Gebze-Orhangazi (including bridge): 40000 PCU/day
- Orhangazi-Bursa: 35000 PCU/day
- Bursa-Balıkesir: 17000 PCU/day
- Balıkesir-İzmir: 23000 PCU/day

=== Technical details ===
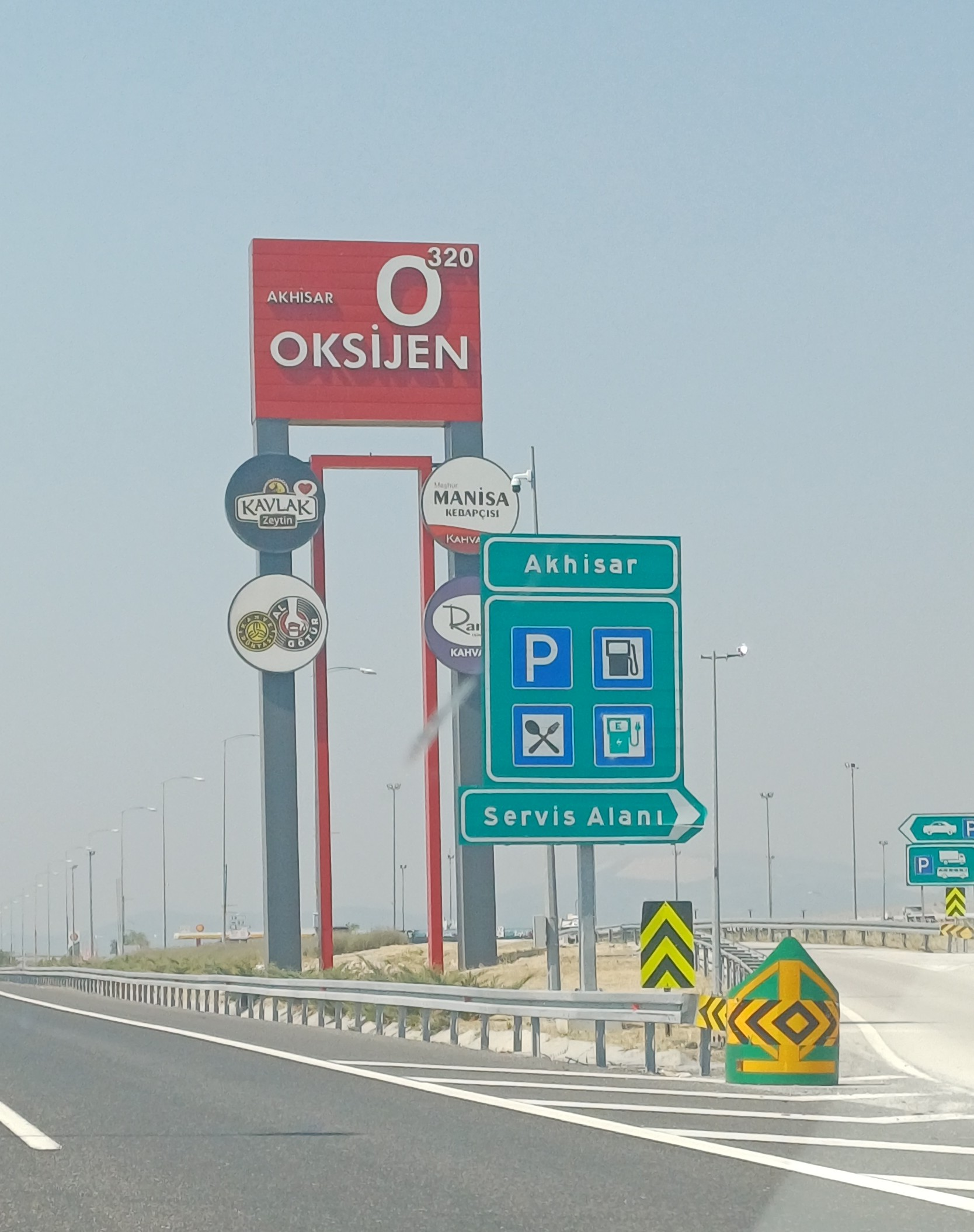
Oksijen Akhisar Service area enter Sign, O 320 Akhisar

- 377 kilometres of motorway, 44 kilometres of connection roads
- 1 suspension bridge with a main span of 1,550 metres Osman Gazi Bridge
- 30 viaducts (18,212 metres)
- 3 tunnels (6,200 metres)
- 209 small bridges
- 18 toll plazas
- 7 service areas and 7 parking areas (Parking areas was numbered via "Where which km did You are in, For example, O 320 (320th km of the road)

== Tunnels ==
- Orhangazi Tunnel - 3,586 m (11,211 ft)
- Selçukgazi Tunnel - 1,234 m (4,049 ft)
- Belkahve Tunnel - ~1,700 m

== Exit list ==
Province	District	km	mi	Exit	Destinations	Notes
Kocaeli	Gebze	0.0	0.0	K1	O-4 — Istanbul, Ankara	
Gulf of İzmit		5	3.1	Osman Gazi Bridge Toll ₺		
Yalova	Altınova	12.7	7.9	K2	D.575 — Yalova, İzmit	
Yalova	Çiftlikköy	24.2	15.0	K3	Taşköprü Kılıç Rd. — Kılıç	
Yalova–Bursa line	Çiftlikköy–Orhangazi line	30.9	19.2	Orhangazi Tunnel		
Bursa	Orhangazi	39.5	24.5	K4	D.150 — Orhangazi, İznik	
Bursa	Orhangazi	58.2	36.2	K5	D.575 — Gemlik / P.16-09 — Dırazali	Connects to D.595
Bursa	Gemlik	66.6	41.4	K6	D.575 — Gemlik	
Bursa	Osmangazi	77.9	48.4	Selçukgazi Tunnel		
Bursa	Osmangazi	79.5	49.4	Ovaakça Toll Plaza		
Bursa	Osmangazi	83.8	52.1	K7	O-22 — Turanköy	East end of the Bursa Beltway
Bursa	Nilüfer	91.7	57.0	K8	D.575 — Mudanya	
Bursa	Nilüfer	100.1	62.2	K9	Görükle connector — Görükle	Connects to D.200
Bursa	Nilüfer	105.5	65.6	K10	D.200 — Çanakkale	West end of the Bursa Beltway
Bursa	Karacabey	107.1	66.5	Karacabey Toll Plaza		
Bursa	Karacabey	142.5	88.5	K11	D.200 — Karacabey	
Balıkesir	Susurluk	173.2	107.6	K12	D.565 — Susurluk	
Balıkesir	Balıkesir	201.4	125.1	K13	D.565 — Balıkesir	
Balıkesir	Balıkesir	230.5	143.2	K14	D.230 — Balıkesir, Edremit	
Balıkesir	Savaştepe	262.4	163.0	K15	P.10-51 — Savaştepe	
Manisa	Soma	277.4	172.4	K16	P.45-04 — Soma	Connects to D.240
Manisa	Kırkağaç	299.5	186.1	K17	D.240 — Soma	
Manisa	Akhisar	315.1	195.8	K18	Akhisar connector — Akhisar	Connects to D.565
Manisa	Saruhanlı	339.6	211.0	K19	D.565 — Saruhanlı	
Manisa	Turgutlu	373	232	K20	D.250 — Turgutlu, Manisa	
İzmir	Kemalpaşa	385	239	Sancaklı Toll Plaza		
İzmir	Kemalpaşa	385.6	239.6	K21	İstiklal St. — Akalan	
İzmir	Kemalpaşa	389.6	242.1	K22	Kemalpaşa connector — Kemalpaşa	Connects to P.35-25 and P.35-26
İzmir	Kemalpaşa	393.4	244.4	K23	40th St. — Kuyucak	
İzmir	Kemalpaşa	396.8	246.6	K24	Necdet Bukey Ave. — İstiklal, Ulucak	
İzmir	Kemalpaşa–Bornova line	399.3	248.1	Belkahve Tunnel		
İzmir	Bornova	407.8	253.4	K25	Karasuluk connector — Bornova	Connects to D.300
İzmir	Bornova	408.6	253.9	K9	O-30 — Menemen, Balçova	İzmir Beltway
İzmir	Bornova	409.4	254.4		Kamil Tunca Blvd. — İZOTAŞ	İzmir Coach Terminal
1.000 mi = 1.609 km; 1.000 km = 0.621 mi: Tolled

== See also ==
- List of motorways in Turkey
