= Armutlu Peninsula =

Peninsula in the Sea of Marmara, Turkey

Native name: Armutlu Yarımadası
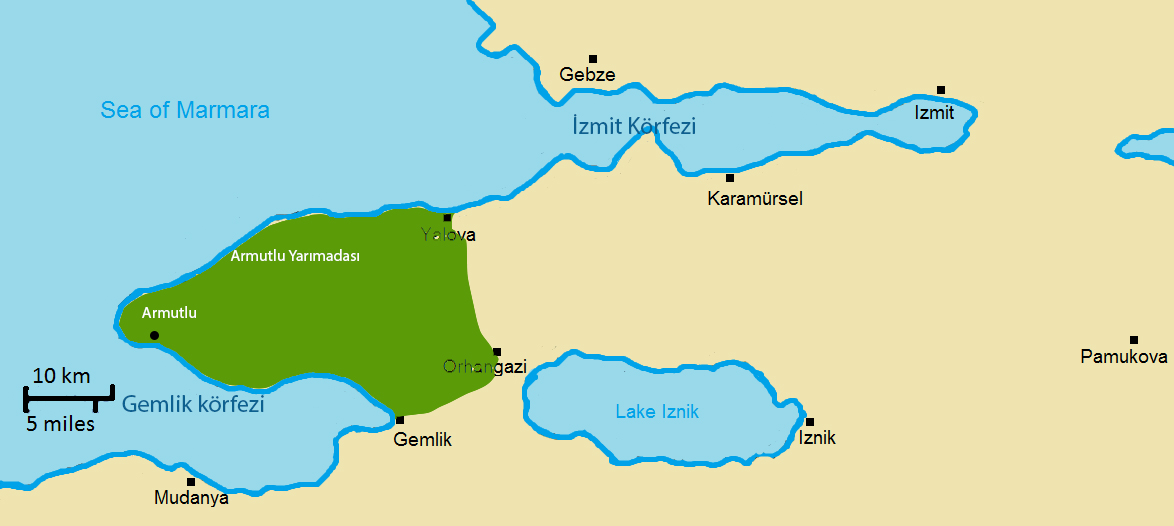
- Interactive map of Armutlu Peninsula

Geography
- Location: Marmara Sea
- Coordinates: 40°33′N 28°55′E
- Highest elevation: 921 m (3022 ft)
- Highest point: Taz Mountain

Administration
- Turkey
- Region: Marmara
- Provinces: Kocaeli, Yalova, Bursa
- Cities and towns: Gölcük, Karamürsel, Yalova, Çınarcık, Gemlik

The Armutlu Peninsula (Turkish: Armutlu Yarımadası) is a peninsula extending westward into Marmara Sea in the Anatolian section of Turkey. In addition to Yalova Province, parts of Kocaeli Province and Bursa Province are on the peninsula.

== Geography ==
Armutlu Peninsula is between Gulf of Izmit in the north and Gulf of Gemlik in the south. The westernmost point of the peninsula is the cape of Bozburun. The bird's flight distance between Bozburun and the tip of the northern gulf is about 100 km (62 mi). But, the distance between Bozburun and the tip of the southern gulf is only about 30 km (19 mi). To the southeast of the peninsula, Lake İznik is situated.

The peninsula is actually a part of Samanlı Mountains, a mountain range lying between Bolu Mountains and Bozburun. The peak of the mountains within the peninsula is Taz Mountain with an altitude of 921 m (3,022 ft). The mountains are covered with forests.

== Notable places ==
Yalova, central city of the Yalova Province is at the northern coast. Most district centers of the province are in the coastal area of the peninsula. The peninsula is named after Armutlu district. Gölcük, a town in Kocaeli Province, best known for the Turkish Navy's main naval base with shipyard and the Ford Otosan automobile plant, is located at the northern gulf of the peninsula. Also on the northern coastline between Gölcük and Yalova, Karamürsel is located in Kocaeli Province. Historically, it was an important Ottoman naval base and during the Cold War era, the town hosted a United States naval air station, which operated a special antenna to intercept Soviet Union radio transmissions. West of Yalova, Çınarcık is located, a well-known seaside resort.

Another notable location is Gemlik, a district of Bursa Province, situated at the peninsula's southern gulf. An important port city, it is renowned for its olives and olive oil.

The population density in the mountains at the inner peninsula is low, where there are only small villages.

== Geology ==
Both gulfs at the north and the south are actually on two active tectonic fault lines. The entire peninsula was hit by the İzmit earthquake on August 17, 1999, that occurred along the western portion of the North Anatolian Fault Zone.
