= Belkahve Tunnel =

Tunnel in İzmir, Turkey

Belkahve Tunnel Belkahve Tüneli
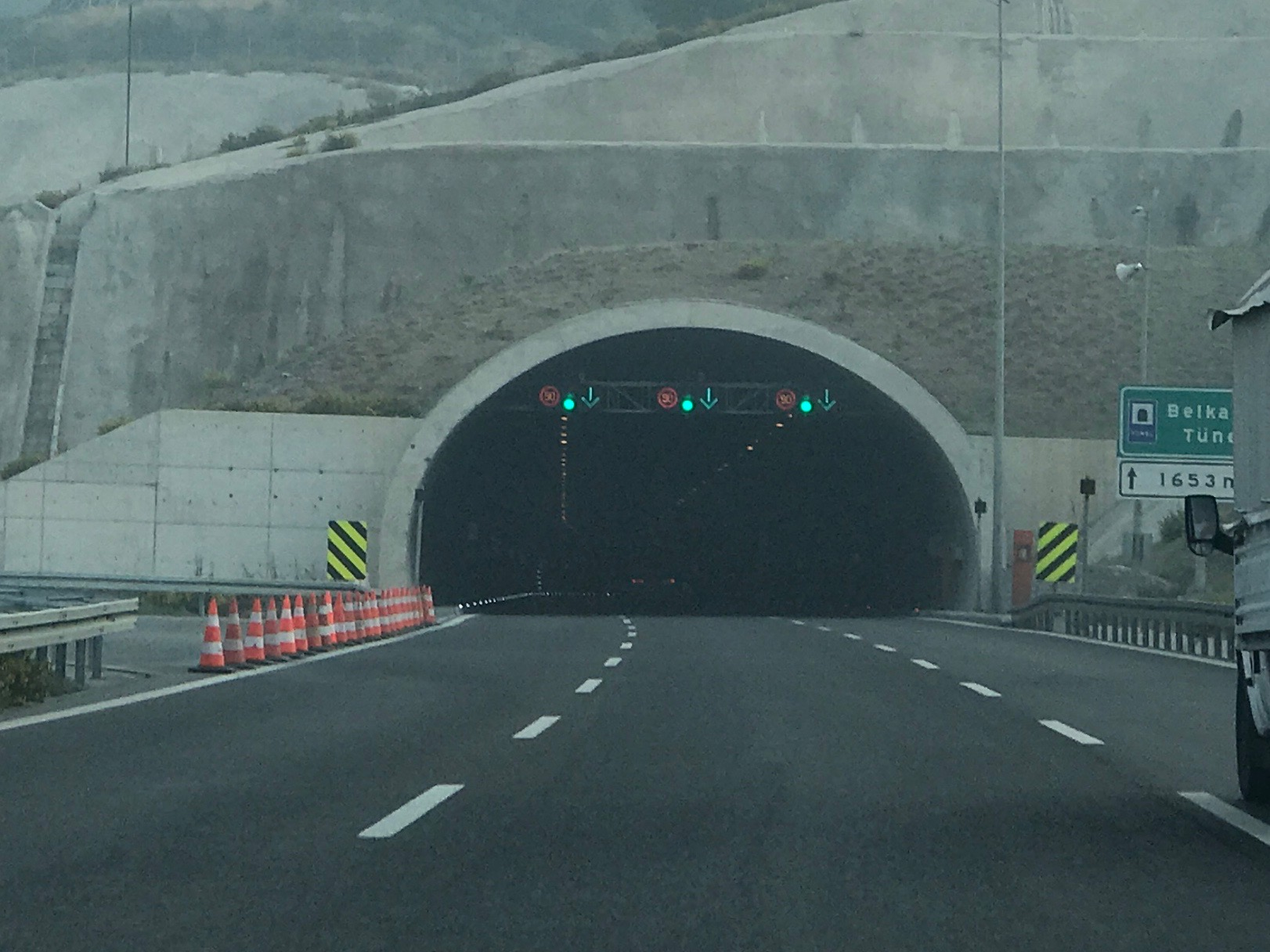
- Interactive map of Belkahve Tunnel; Belkahve Tüneli

Overview
- Location: Kavaklıdere, Bornova - Ulucak, Kemalpaşa, İzmir Province
- Coordinates: 38°27′47″N 27°19′18″E
- Status: Operational
- Route: O-5

Operation
- Work began: 7 July 2013
- Constructed: Otoyol A.Ş.
- Opened: 8 March 2017; 9 years ago
- Owner: General Directorate of Highways
- Traffic: automotive
- Character: Twin-tube motorway tunnel

Technical
- Length: 1,556 and 1,653 m (5,105 and 5,423 ft)
- No. of lanes: 2 x 3
- Tunnel clearance: 6 m (20 ft)
- Width: 2 x 12 m (39 ft)

Location of Belkahve Tunnel in Turkey

The Belkahve Tunnel (Turkish: Belkahve Tüneli) is a motorway tunnel located in İzmir Province, Aegean Region as part of the Gebze-Orhangazi-İzmir Motorway O-5 in Turkey.

Situated at Belkahve Hill between Kavaklıdere in Bornova district and Ulucak in Kemalpaşa east of İzmir, it is a 1,556 and 1,653 m (5,105 and 5,423 ft)-long twin-tube tunnel carrying three lanes of traffic in each direction. The tubes are 12 m (39 ft) wide and have 6 m (20 ft) clearance. The construction works are being carried out by Otoyol A.Ş., a consortium of Turkish Nurol, Özaltın, Makyol, Yüksel, Göçay and Italian Astaldi companies. The New Austrian Tunnelling method (NATM) is being applied for the boring of the tunnel. Average daily progression in both tubes of the tunnel is 4 m (13 ft), where 60 people are at work. Groundbreaking ceremony was held in presence of Minister of Transport, Maritime and Communication Binali Yıldırım on 7 July 2013.

The tunnel was opened to traffic on 8 March 2017 by Turkish Prime Minister Binali Yıldırım.

Other tunnels on the route are the 3,586 and 3,591 m (11,765 and 11,781 ft)-long Orhangazi Tunnel and the 1,192 and 1,303 m (3,911 and 4,275 ft)-long Selçukgazi Tunnel.

== See also ==
- List of motorway tunnels in Turkey
