= Selçukgazi Tunnel =

Motorway tunnel in Osmangazi, Turkey

Selçukgazi Tunnel Selçukgazi Tüneli
- Interactive map of Selçukgazi Tunnel; Selçukgazi Tüneli

Overview
- Location: Selçukgazi, Osmangazi, Bursa Province
- Coordinates: 40°19′25″N 29°06′26″E
- Status: Operational
- Route: O-5

Operation
- Work began: July 2013
- Constructed: Otoyol A.Ş.
- Opened: March 12, 2017; 9 years ago
- Owner: General Directorate of Highways
- Traffic: automotive
- Character: Twin-tube motorway tunnel

Technical
- Length: 1,192 and 1,303 m (3,911 and 4,275 ft)
- No. of lanes: 2 x 3

Location of Selçukgazi Tunnel in Turkey

The Selçukgazi Tunnel (Turkish: Selçukgazi Tüneli) is a motorway tunnel located at Dürdane Hill in Marmara region as part of the Istanbul-Bursa Motorway O-5 in Turkey.

Situated near Selçukgazi village in Osmangazi district between Gemlik and Bursa, it is a twin-tube tunnel of 1,192 and 1,303 m (3,911 and 4,275 ft). The construction is carried out by Otoyol A.Ş., a consortium of Turkish Nurol, Özaltın, Makyol, Yüksel, Göçay and Italian Astaldi companies. Works at the tunnel began in July 2013, and are continuing. In March 2014, it was announced that the preparatory works are completed and tunneling will start soon.

The tunnel was opened to traffic on March 12, 2017 by Turkish Prime Minister Binali Yıldırım.

Other tunnels on the route are the 3,586 and 3,591 m (11,765 and 11,781 ft)-long Orhangazi Tunnel and the 1,556 and 1,653 m (5,105 and 5,423 ft)-long Belkahve Tunnel.

== See also ==
- List of motorway tunnels in Turkey
