= Hersek Headland =

Coordinates: 40°44′N 29°31′E

Hersek headland (Turkish: Hersek burnu) is a headland in Turkey.

== Geography ==
Hersek headland is a headland in Altınova district of Yalova Province. It is an Anatolian headland pointing north to Gulf of İzmit which is a part of Marmara Sea. Although the average width of the gulf is about 9 kilometres (5.6 mi), the width at the north of Hersek headland is only 3 kilometres (1.9 mi).

== History ==
The strategic importance of the headland was noticed by the Roman Emperor Constantine I who founded the town of Helenopolis. Later during the First Crusade, Seljuk sultan Kılıç Arslan I defeated people's crusades in the battle of Civetot near Helenopolis. Hersek headland is also known as the place where the Ottoman Empire (then only a principality) proclaimed independence. On 27 July 1302, Ottoman armies defeated Byzantine armies which tried to relieve the city of Nicea (modern İznik) from Ottoman siege in the battle of Koyunhisar. After this battle Osman I declared the independence of his principality.

== Bridge project ==
The İzmit Bay Bridge is under construction between Hersek headland and Dilovası on the opposite side of the gulf. According to official statement, the bridge will be 3 kilometres (1.9 mi) and the present Istanbul-İzmir highway distance to will be shortened by 140 kilometres (87 mi).
