= Orhangazi Tunnel =

Motorway tunnel in Turkey

Orhangazi Tunnel Orhangazi Tüneli
- Interactive map of Orhangazi Tunnel; Orhangazi Tüneli

Overview
- Location: Orhangazi, Bursa Province – Yalova Province
- Coordinates: 40°33′57″N 29°21′19″E
- Status: Open
- Route: O-5

Operation
- Work began: 15 February 2012
- Constructed: Otoyol A.Ş.
- Opened: 21 April 2016; 10 years ago
- Owner: General Directorate of Highways
- Traffic: automotive
- Character: Twin-tube motorway tunnel

Technical
- Length: 3,586 and 3,591 m (11,765 and 11,781 ft)
- No. of lanes: 2 x 3

Location of Orhangazi Tunnel in Turkey

The Orhangazi Tunnel (Turkish: Orhangazi Tüneli), is a motorway tunnel located at Samanlı Mountains in Marmara region as part of the Istanbul-Bursa Motorway Otoyol 5 in Turkey.

Situated northeast of Orhangazi town between Laladere and Yeniköy villages on the province border of Yalova and Bursa, it is a twin-tube tunnel of length 3,586 and 3,591 m (11,765 and 11,781 ft) carrying three lanes of traffic in each direction. The construction works began on 15 February 2012, and are being carried out by Otoyol A.Ş., a consortium of Turkish Nurol, Özaltın, Makyol, Yüksel, Göçay and Italian Astaldi companies. The New Austrian Tunnelling method (NATM) was applied for the boring of the tunnel.

Breakthrough in one of the tubes was achieved on 19 February 2014 after two years and four days of work. A related ceremony was held at site in presence of Deputy Prime Minister Bülent Arınç and Minister of Transport, Maritime and Communication Lütfi Elvan on 3 March 2014. It is the second longest motorway tunnel of Turkey, after the T2 tunnel in O-7.

Other tunnels on the route are the 1,192 and 1,303 m (3,911 and 4,275 ft)-long Selçukgazi Tunnel and the 1,556 and 1,653 m (5,105 and 5,423 ft)-long Belkahve Tunnel.

== See also ==
- List of motorway tunnels in Turkey
