= Strobilos (Bithynia) =

Town of ancient Bithyna

Coordinates: 40°39′16″N 29°20′08″E

Strobilos (Ancient Greek: Στρόβιλος) was a town of ancient Bithynia. It is not mentioned by any ancient authors, but appears in epigraphic and other evidence.

Its site is located near Çiftlik in Asiatic Turkey.
