= Arbeila =

Town of ancient Bithynia

Coordinates: 40°45′41″N 29°53′07″E

Arbeila was a town of ancient Bithynia on the coast of the Sinus Astacenus west of Nicomedia. Its name does not appear in ancient authors but is inferred from epigraphic and other evidence.

Its site is located near Tuzla, in Asiatic Turkey.
