= Cius =

Ancient Greek city

- Currently Gemlik, Turkey
- Location within Turkey
- 40.432468°N 29.156389°E
- Location: Anatolia, in present-day Turkey
- Region: Bithynia

Cius (/ˈsaɪəs/; Ancient Greek: Kίος or Κῖος Kios; Currently Gemlik, Turkey) was an Ancient Greek city bordering the Propontis (now known as the Sea of Marmara), in Bithynia and in Mysia (in modern northwestern Turkey). The city was later renamed to Prusias after King Prusias I of Bithynia, who once restored the city.

== Etymology ==
According to the Greek geographer Strabo in his book Geographica, the eponym of the city is, according to a founding myth, an Argonaut who founded the city after returning from Colchis, at the place where the nymphs took away Hylas.

And here is the scene of the myth of Hylas, one of the companions of Herakles who sailed with him on the Argo, and who, when he was going out to get water, was carried off by the nymphs. [...] And still to this day a kind of festival is celebrated among the Prusians, a mountain-ranging festival, in which they march in procession and call Hylas, as though making their exodus to the forests in quest of him.

Greek author Apollonius of Rhodes provided another origin, in Argonautica, that the city of Cius was named after a nearby river and was founded by the Argonaut Polyphemus.

== History ==
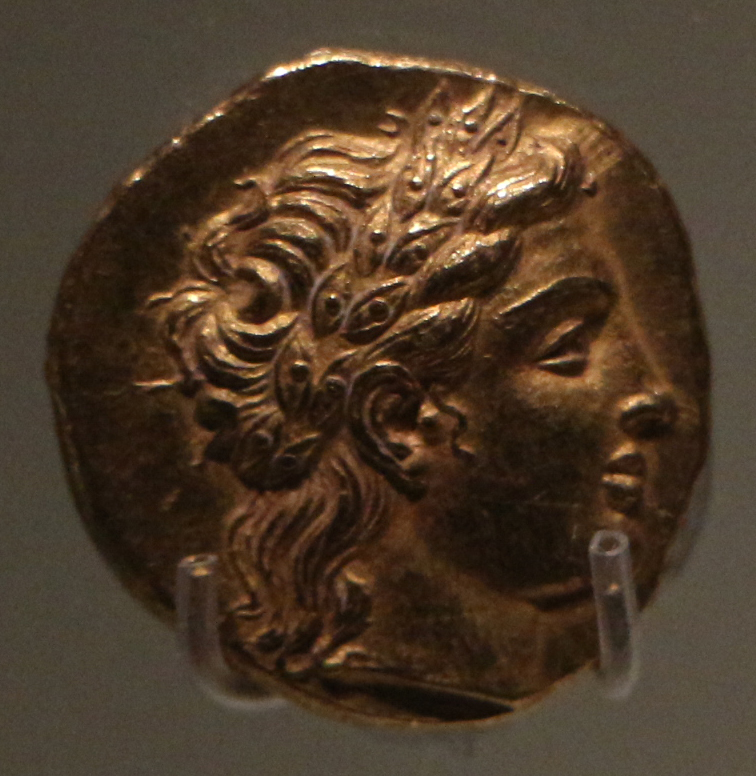
Ancient Greek coin found in the site of what was once Cius.

During the Ionian Revolt (499–493 BC), Cius was captured by the Persians under their general Hymaees on their counter-offensive against the Ionians that had marched on the capital of the Persian Satrapy of Lydia, Sardis, during the Ionian rebellion. Later, Cius was a member of the Delian League. Sometime during the Cretan War (205–200 BC), King Philip V of Macedon put Cius, that was then a member of the Aetolian League, under siege. He then razed the city down and ceded it to King Prusias I of Bithynia, who assisted him in capturing Cius. Prusias later restored it under the name Prusias.

According to numismatist Katja I. L. Sommer, during the Roman rule, Cius issued a revert back from the name Prusias around the reign of Emperor Claudius (r. 41–54) at the latest, possibly in order to gain autonomy, and was later renamed back to Prusias during the Flavian period. It was an important chain in the ancient Silk Road and became known as a wealthy town.

== Geography ==
Cius was strategically placed at the head of a gulf in the Propontis, called the Gulf of Cius, or Cianus Sinus. Historians Herodotus and Xenophon both reverred to it as Cius in Mysia. Naturalist Pliny the Elder reports that Cius was a Milesian colony. It was at the foot of Mount Arganthonius, which Strabo claimed as the place where Hylas was kidnapped by the Nymphs in a myth. Pliny mentioned the rivers Hylas and Cius here, one of which reminds us of the name of the youth who was stolen by the nymphs, and the other of the mythical founder.

The Cius may be the channel by which the lake Ascania (currently known as Lake Iznik) discharges its waters into the gulf of Cius; though Pliny speaks of the Ascanium flumen as flowing into the gulf, and we must assume that he gives this name to the channel which connects the lake and the sea. If the river Cius is not identical with this channel, it must be a small stream near Cius. As Ptolemy speaks of the outlets of the Ascanius, it has been conjectured that there may have been two, and that they may be the Hylas and Cius of Pliny; but the plural ἐκβολαί does not necessarily mean more than a single mouth; and Pliny certainly says that the Ascanius flows into the gulf. However, his geography is a constant cause of difficulty. The position of Cius made it the port for the inland parts, and it became a place of much commercial importance. Pomponius Mela calls it the most convenient emporium of Phrygia, which was at no great distance from it.

== Coins ==
There are coins of Cius, with the legend Κιανων, belonging to the Roman imperial period; and there are coins of Prusias with the epigraph, "Προυσιεων των προς θαλασσαν".

== Ecclesiastical History ==
Cius became an early Christian bishopric. Its bishop, Cyrillus, took part in the First Council of Nicaea in 325, and Theosebius attended the Council of Ephesus. The names of many of his successors in the first millennium are known from extant contemporary documents. At first a suffragan of Nicomedia, it soon became an autocephalous archdiocese, being listed as such in Notitiae Episcopatuum from the 7th century onward. No longer a residential bishopric, Cius is today listed by the Catholic Church as a titular see.

== Modern history ==
Following the population exchange in 1923, the Greek refugees from Cius established the town of Nea Kios, in Argolis, Greece and the village of Paralia, in Pieria, Greece. There are only few remnants of the ancient town and its harbour today. Somewhat more to the west, the town of Gemlik, Bursa Province is enstablished.

== Notable people ==
- Asclepiades of Bithynia (c. 129/4–40 BC), Greek physician
- Caius Calpurnius Asclepiades (88–158 AD), Greek physician

== See also ==
- List of ancient Greek cities

== Bibliography ==
- Corsten, Thomas (1985). Die Inschriften von Kios. Inschriften griechischer Städte aus Kleinasien, vol. 29. Bonn: Habelt, ISBN 3-7749-2194-6, see esp. the introduction on pp. 1–72.
- Richard Talbert, Barrington Atlas of the Greek and Roman World (ISBN 0-691-03169-X), p. 52.
