= Çınarcık District =

District of Yalova Province, Turkey

- District
- Map showing Çınarcık District in Yalova Province

- Location in Turkey Çınarcık District (Marmara)
- Coordinates: 40°38′N 29°07′E
- Country: Turkey
- Province: Yalova
- Seat: Çınarcık

Government
  - Kaymakam: Cemil Aksak
- Area: 178 km^{2} (69 sq mi)
- Population (2022): 38,600
  - Density: 220/km^{2} (560/sq mi)
- Time zone: UTC+3 (TRT)
- Website: www.cinarcik.gov.tr

Çınarcık District is a district of the Yalova Province of Turkey. Its seat is the town of Çınarcık. Its area is 178 km^{2}, and its population is 38,600 (2022).

== Composition ==
There are four municipalities in Çınarcık District:

- Çınarcık
- Esenköy
- Koru
- Teşvikiye

There are four villages in Çınarcık District:

- Çalıca
- Kocadere
- Ortaburun
- Şenköy
