= Osman Gazi Bridge =

Turkish suspension bridge across the Gulf of İzmit

Osman Gazi Bridge Osmangazi Köprüsü
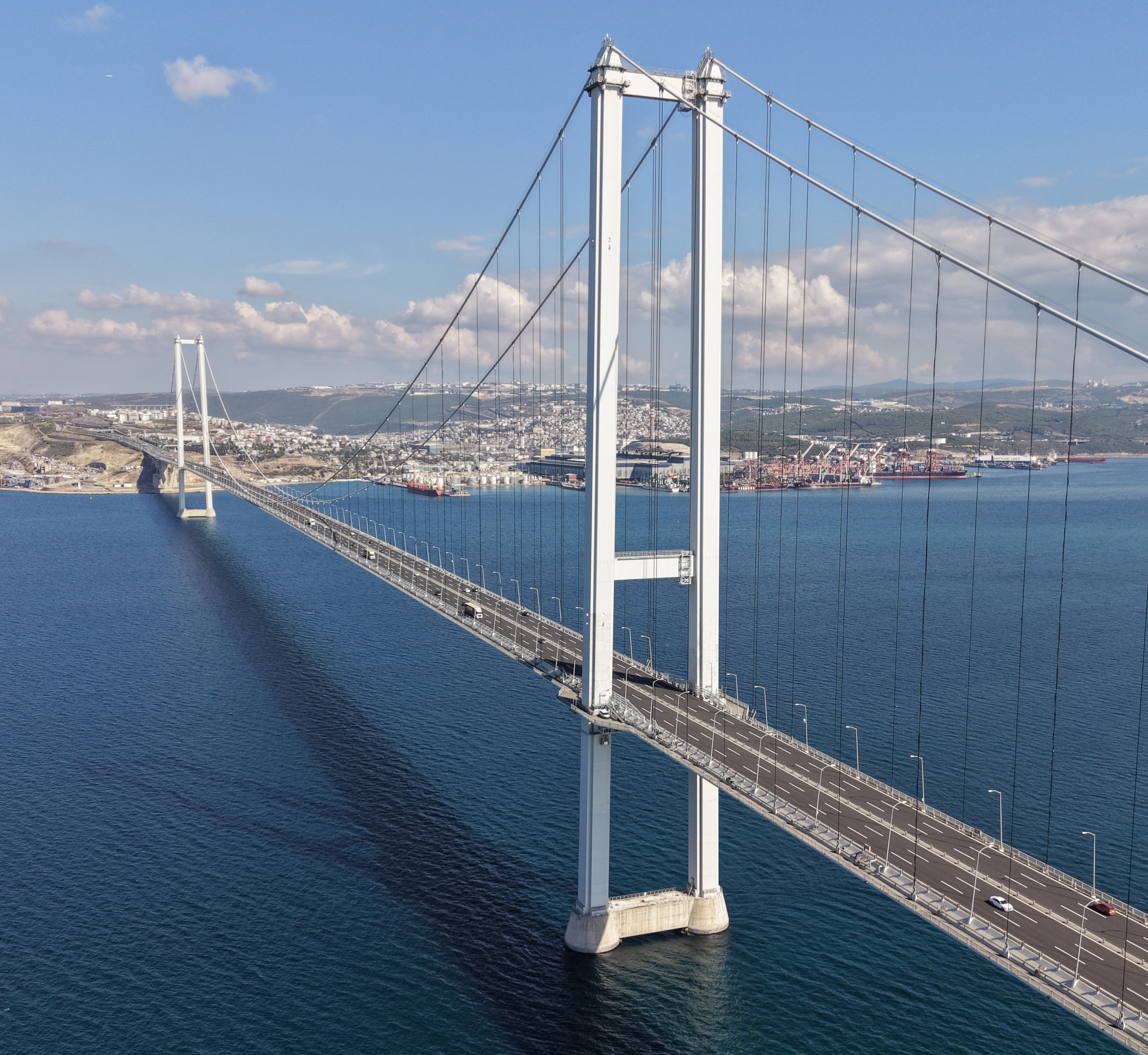
- Osman Gazi Bridge at the Gulf of İzmit
- Coordinates: 40.7552°N 29.5157°E
- Carries: 6 lanes of O-5 motorway
- Crosses: Gulf of İzmit
- Locale: Kocaeli, Turkey
- Official name: Osmangazi Köprüsü
- Other name: İzmit Bay Bridge
- Named for: Osman Gazi
- Maintained by: Nömayg - Nurol, Özaltın, Makyol, Yüksel, Gocay

Characteristics
- Design: Suspension
- Material: Steel
- Pier construction: concrete
- Total length: 2,682 m (8,799 ft)
- Width: 35.93 m (117.9 ft)
- Height: 252 m (827 ft) (pylons)
- Traversable?: Yes
- Longest span: 1,550 m (5,090 ft)
- No. of spans: 3
- Piers in water: 2
- Clearance below: 64 m (210 ft)

History
- Architect: Dissing+Weitling
- Designer: IHI Corporation
- Contracted lead designer: IHI Corporation
- Engineering design by: COWI A/S
- Construction start: 30 March 2013
- Construction end: 30 June 2016
- Construction cost: US$ 1.2 billion
- Inaugurated: 1 July 2016

Statistics
- Daily traffic: approx. 6000 PCE/day
- Toll: ₺184,50 (2022- Passenger Vehicles)

Location
- Interactive map of Osman Gazi Bridge

The Osman Gazi Bridge (Turkish: Osmangazi Köprüsü) is a suspension bridge spanning the Gulf of İzmit at its narrowest point, 2,620 m (8,600 ft). The bridge links the Turkish city of Gebze to the Yalova Province and carries the O-5 motorway across the gulf.

The bridge was opened on 1 July 2016 to become the then-longest suspension bridge in Turkey and the fourth-longest (ninth-longest as of 2025) suspension bridge in the world by the length of its central span.

The length of the bridge was surpassed by the Çanakkale 1915 Bridge across the Dardanelles strait, which became the longest suspension bridge in the world when it was opened on 18 March 2022.

== Project ==
Construction and operation of the bridge was awarded to a joint venture (NOMAYG JV) formed by five Turkish companies (Nurol, Özaltın, Makyol, Yüksel and Gocay) and one Italian construction company Astaldi following the international Build–operate–transfer tender that took place in April 2009. In 2010, a contract was signed for the project that was estimated to cost ₺11 billion for the entire highway from Gebze to Bursa.

On 30 March 2013 Prime minister Recep Tayyip Erdoğan laid the ground stone for the bridge. After the completion of the bridge, the distance between Istanbul and İzmir shortened by about 140 km (87 mi), bypassing the lengthy distance around the Gulf of İzmit. The 420 km (260 mi) highway and bridge reduced the travel time between the two major cities from around six hours to five. The bridge and connecting highway provides three lanes of traffic in each direction. Construction was completed on 30 June 2016.

Two lanes of high-speed railway were also planned to run through the middle of the bridge, but were scrapped in favor for a fourth lane for both ways. The decision lead to criticism and sparked people being suspicious of politicians being involved with automobile lobbyists.

== EPC Bridge Contractor ==
The US$1 billion privately financed bridge was awarded to the Japanese firm IHI Infrastructure System Co. on 16 July 2011 as EPC basis with FIDIC Silverbook contract. IHI, which was one of the contractors of second Bosphorus bridge, also completed the seismic reinforcement projects for Halic and Mecidiyekoy viaducts. IHI subcontracted the design works to Danish engineering design firm COWI A/S, which collaborated for the aesthetic design with Dissing+Weitling. Notice to proceed was given by NOMAYG JV to IHI on 1 January 2013 and the expected total project duration was 37 months.

The dimensions are:

- main span length: 1,550 m (5,090 ft)
- side spans length: 566 m (1,857 ft)
- clearance: 64 m (210 ft)
- tower height: 252.0 m (826.8 ft)
- tower size (at the base): 8 m × 7 m (26 ft × 23 ft)
- deck size: 35.93 m × 4.75 m (117.9 ft × 15.6 ft)

The 34,000 tons of steel used to build the bridge was obtained from Liberty Galați, Romania.

The bridge is fourth longest suspension bridge in the world.

The bridge is lit with Schréder Evolo lanterns with high pressure sodium lamps.

== Accident at construction site ==
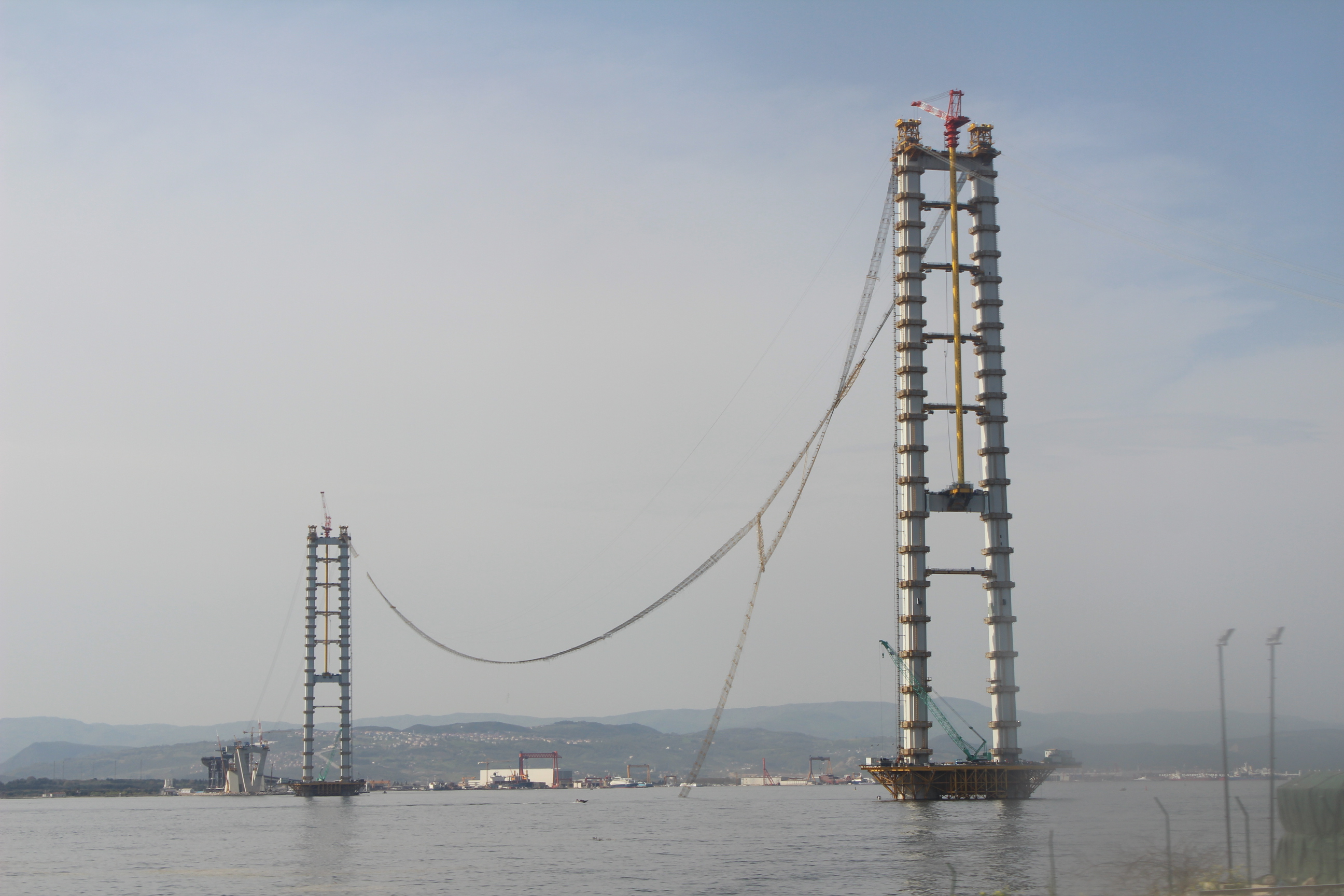
The bridge after the accident.

On 21 March 2015 a catwalk broke away from its bolted joint cable on the south tower during the construction at the bridge and fell into the water. Added in February 2015, the catwalk was needed to allow workers access to the other side of the bay. No one was harmed by the accident as work was interrupted at this section due to windy weather. Marine traffic to and from İzmit Bay was suspended following the accident for security reasons and resumed after recovering the cable in the morning of 23 March.

Kishi Ryoichi, the 51-year-old Japanese engineer of the IHI-Itochu Consortium, who was in charge of the construction at site, committed suicide after the accident. He was found dead at the entrance of a cemetery near his lodging in Altınova. He left a note saying that "...this failure ends my private and professional life. This project was mine and my country's pride. No one else is responsible for this failure."

== Tolls ==
As of 13 May 2023 the bridge tolls are (forex rate of 15 June 2023: USDTRY=23.67):

Vehicle class	Toll ₺ (TRY)	Toll $ (USD)
Vehicles with 2 axles, wheelbase <3.2m	184.50	7.79
Vehicles with 2 axles, wheelbase >3.2m	295	12.46
Vehicles with 3 axles	350	14.78
Vehicles with 4 or 5 axles	464.50	19.62
Vehicles with 6 or more axles	585.50	24.73
Motorcycles	129	5.45

== In popular culture ==
The five-time Supersport World champion Kenan Sofuoğlu from Turkey made a show of a motorcycle speed trial in the early morning of 30 June 2016, right before the official opening of the bridge. He crossed the 1.5 km (0.93 mi) distance in 26 seconds reaching a top speed of 400 km/h (250 mph) on his Kawasaki Ninja H2R track-only motorcycle.

== See also ==
- Bosphorus Bridge
- Fatih Sultan Mehmet Bridge
- Yavuz Sultan Selim Bridge
- Çanakkale 1915 Bridge
- Eurasia Tunnel, undersea tunnel, crossing the Bosphorus for vehicular traffic, opened in December 2016.
- Marmaray, undersea rail tunnel connecting the Asian and European sides of Istanbul.
- Great Istanbul Tunnel, a proposed three-level road-rail undersea tunnel.
- Public transport in Istanbul
- Rail transport in Turkey
- Turkish Straits
