= Fevziye, Gemlik =

Village in Turkey

Fevziye
- Neighbourhood
- Country: Turkey
- Province: Bursa
- District: Gemlik
- Population (2022): 173
- Time zone: UTC+3 (TRT)

Fevziye is a neighbourhood in the municipality and district of Gemlik, Bursa Province, Turkey. Its population was 173 in 2002.
