= Kurtul, Gemlik =

Village in Turkey

Kurtul
- Neighbourhood
- Country: Turkey
- Province: Bursa
- District: Gemlik
- Population (2022): 827
- Time zone: UTC+3 (TRT)

Kurtul is a neighbourhood in the municipality and district of Gemlik, Bursa Province, Turkey. Its population is 827 (2022).
