= Tavşanlı, Yalova =

Tavşanlı
- Municipality
- Location in Turkey Tavşanlı (Marmara)
- Coordinates: 40°40′N 29°27′E
- Country: Turkey
- Province: Yalova
- District: Altınova
- Elevation: 150 m (490 ft)
- Population (2022): 4,118
- Time zone: UTC+3 (TRT)
- Postal code: 77720
- Area code: 0226

Tavşanlı is a town (belde) in the Altınova District, Yalova Province, Turkey. Its population is 4,118 (2022). It is situated in the northern portion of Armutlu Peninsula. The distance to Altınova is 5 kilometres (3.1 mi) and to Yalova is 14 kilometres (8.7 mi). The ferry dock is only 3.5 kilometres (2.2 mi) to Tavşanlı and the picnik places around the town can easily by reached in daily tours from Istanbul. Fruit and vegetable farming as well as floriculture are the main sources of revenue of the town.
