= Çiftlikköy District =

District of Yalova Province, Turkey

- District
- Map showing Çiftlikköy District in Yalova Province

- Location in Turkey Çiftlikköy District (Marmara)
- Coordinates: 40°39′N 29°20′E
- Country: Turkey
- Province: Yalova
- Seat: Çiftlikköy

Government
  - Kaymakam: Ömer Bilgin
- Area: 136 km^{2} (53 sq mi)
- Population (2022): 50,974
  - Density: 370/km^{2} (970/sq mi)
- Time zone: UTC+3 (TRT)
- Website: www.ciftlikkoy.gov.tr

Çiftlikköy District is a district of the Yalova Province of Turkey. Its seat is the town of Çiftlikköy. Its area is 136 km^{2}, and its population is 50,974 (2022).

== Composition ==
There are two municipalities in Çiftlikköy District:

- Çiftlikköy
- Taşköprü

There are 9 villages in Çiftlikköy District:

- Burhaniye
- Çukurköy
- Denizçalı
- Dereköy
- Gacık
- İlyasköy
- Kabaklı
- Kılıç
- Laledere
