= Kavaklıdere, Bornova =

Kavaklıdere
- Neighbourhood
- Location in Turkey Kavaklıdere (İzmir)
- Coordinates: 38°27′N 27°19′E
- Country: Turkey
- Province: İzmir
- District: Bornova
- Elevation: 200 m (660 ft)
- Population (2022): 3,164
- Time zone: UTC+3 (TRT)
- Postal code: 35040
- Area code: 0232

Kavaklıdere is a neighbourhood in the municipality and district of Bornova, İzmir Province, Turkey. Its population is 3,164 (2022). It is 7 kilometres (4.3 mi) east of Bornova which is a part of Greater İzmir. It is situated to the south of Belkahve Pass and Turkish state highway D.300 which connects İzmir to Ankara. Most of Kavaklıdere residents work in city services in İzmir and elsewhere.
