= Büyükkumla, Gemlik =

Büyükkumla
- Neighbourhood
- Location in Turkey Büyükkumla (Marmara)
- Coordinates: 40°28′45″N 29°05′00″E
- Country: Turkey
- Province: Bursa
- District: Gemlik
- Population (2022): 629
- Time zone: UTC+3 (TRT)

Büyükkumla is a neighbourhood in the municipality and district of Gemlik, Bursa Province, Turkey. Its population is 629 (2022).

== Geography ==
It is 33 km from Bursa and 8 km from Gemlik.

== Population ==
Historical population
Year	Pop.	±% p.a.
1990	742	—
1997	743	+0.02%
2007	651	−1.31%
2012	687	+1.08%
2017	652	−1.04%
2022	629	−0.72%
Source: 1990 census, 1997 census and TÜIK (2007-2022)
