= Adliye, Gemlik =

Village in Turkey

Adliye
- Neighbourhood
- Location in Turkey Adliye (Marmara)
- Coordinates: 40.3878°N 29.2054°E
- Country: Turkey
- Province: Bursa
- District: Gemlik
- Population (2022): 213
- Time zone: UTC+3 (TRT)

Adliye is a neighbourhood in the municipality and district of Gemlik, Bursa Province in Turkey. Its population is 213 (2022).
