= Mount Arganthonius =

Coordinates: 40°32′37″N 29°01′55″E

Mount Arganthonius or Arganthonios (Ancient Greek: Ἀργανθώνιος), or Arganthon (Ἀργανθών), or Arganthoneion, was a mountain range in ancient Bithynia, which forms a peninsula, and divides the gulfs of Cius and Astacus. The range terminates in a headland which Ptolemy calls Posidium (modern Bozburun). The name is connected with the myths of Hylas and the Argonautic expedition.

Its modern name is Samanli Daği.
