= Subaşı, Yalova =

Subaşı
- Municipality
- Location in Turkey Subaşı (Marmara)
- Coordinates: 40°42′N 29°30′E
- Country: Turkey
- Province: Yalova
- District: Altınova
- Elevation: 10 m (30 ft)
- Population (2022): 8,281
- Time zone: UTC+3 (TRT)
- Postal code: 77710
- Area code: 0226
- Website: www.yalovasubasi.bel.tr

Subaşı is a town (belde) in the Altınova District, Yalova Province, Turkey. Its population is 8,281 (2022). It is close to Hersek Headland of Marmara Sea and has almost merged to Altınova to the east. The distance to Yalova is 12 kilometres (7.5 mi). The name of the village refers to subaşi, a title in the Ottoman bureaucracy and the residents of the town are mostly Turkish, Tatar and Gagauz migrants who left Dobrudzha and Deliorman area in Romania today Bulgaria around 1935. The settlement was declared a seat of township in 1992. It suffered severely in the 7.6 magnitude 1999 İzmit earthquake.
