= Cihatlı, Gemlik =

Village in Turkey

Cihatlı
- Neighbourhood
- Location in Turkey Cihatlı (Marmara)
- Coordinates: 40°26′N 29°12′E
- Country: Turkey
- Province: Bursa
- District: Gemlik
- Population (2022): 1,603
- Time zone: UTC+3 (TRT)

Cihatlı is a neighbourhood in the municipality and district of Gemlik, Bursa Province, Turkey. Its population is 1,603 (2022).
