= Altınova District =

District of Yalova Province, Turkey

- District
- Map showing Altınova District in Yalova Province

- Location in Turkey Altınova District (Marmara)
- Coordinates: 40°41′N 29°31′E
- Country: Turkey
- Province: Yalova
- Seat: Altınova

Government
  - Kaymakam: Regaip Ahmet Özyiğit
- Area: 113 km^{2} (44 sq mi)
- Population (2022): 32,207
  - Density: 290/km^{2} (740/sq mi)
- Time zone: UTC+3 (TRT)
- Website: www.altinova.gov.tr

Altınova District is a district of the Yalova Province of Turkey. Its seat is the town of Altınova. Its area is 113 km^{2}, and its population is 32,207 (2022).

== Composition ==
There are four municipalities in Altınova District:

- Altınova
- Kaytazdere
- Subaşı
- Tavşanlı

There are 12 villages in Altınova District:

- Ahmediye
- Aktoprak
- Çavuş
- Çavuşçiftliği
- Fevziye
- Geyikdere
- Havuzdere
- Karadere
- Örencik
- Sermayecik
- Soğuksu
- Tokmak
