= Koru, Yalova =

Koru
- Municipality
- Location in Turkey Koru (Marmara)
- Coordinates: 40°39′N 29°10′E
- Country: Turkey
- Province: Yalova
- District: Çınarcık
- Elevation: 10 m (30 ft)
- Population (2022): 7,841
- Time zone: UTC+3 (TRT)
- Postal code: 77340
- Area code: 0226

Koru (former Kuri) is a town (belde) in the Çınarcık District, Yalova Province, Turkey. Its population is 7,841 (2022). Up to 20th century the population was composed of Greeks. It is between Çınarcık to west and Yalova to east, all coastal places on the Anatolian side of Marmara Sea. Distance to Çınarcık is 5 kilometres (3.1 mi) and to Yalova is 9 kilometres (5.6 mi).

== Name ==
The name of the settlement was Kuri. After the Population exchange between Greece and Turkey agreement, the former population of the settlement was replaced by the Turks from Serres and Drama in 1924. The former name was changed to a Turkish name with a similar sound and meaning small forest quite suitable for Koru.

== History ==
In 1992, the settlement was declared a seat of township.

In 1999 the town suffered from the Great earthquake. Now the town is flourishing as a center of floriculture. Many agricultural crops are also produced.
