= Kaytazdere =

- Municipality
- Location in Turkey Kaytazdere (Marmara)
- Coordinates: 40°41′N 29°32′E
- Country: Turkey
- Province: Yalova
- District: Altınova
- Elevation: 45 m (148 ft)
- Population (2022): 6,873
- Time zone: UTC+3 (TRT)
- Postal code: 77720
- Area code: 0226

Kaytazdere is a town (belde) in the Altınova District, Yalova Province, Turkey. Its population is 6,873 (2022). It is almost merged to Altınova. Distance to Yalova is 25 kilometres (16 mi). The settlement was founded at the end of the second Balkan War by Turkish refugees from Bulgaria. After the second World War an airbase was established around Kaytazdere. The economy of the town depends on small industries and agriculture.
