= Gemlik olive =

Variety of olive

Gemlik-Tirilye
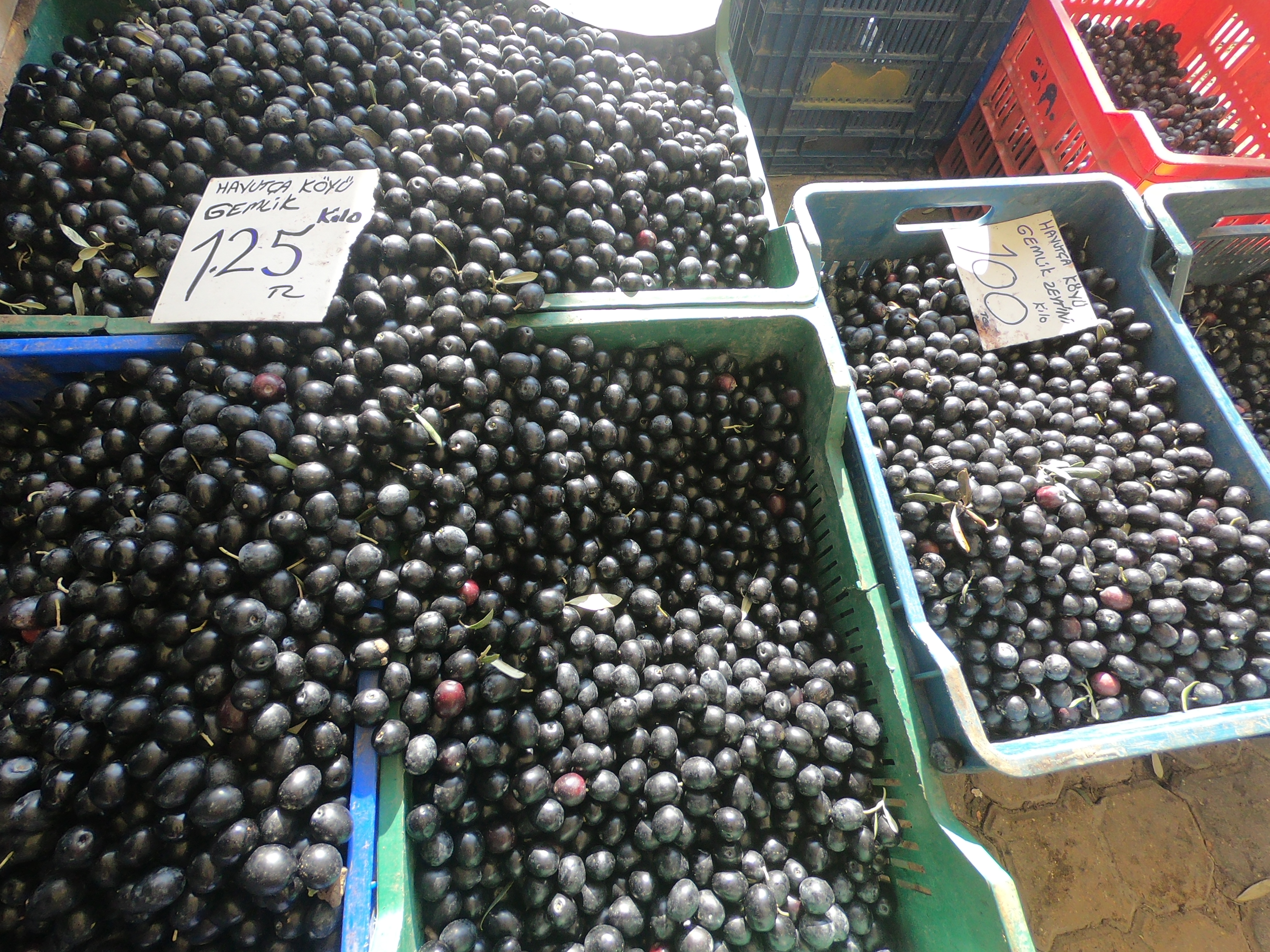
- Raw Gemlik Olives

Olive (Olea europaea)
- Color of the ripe fruit: Black
- Origin: Turkey
- Notable regions: Zeytinbağı, Gemlik
- Use: Table and oil

A Gemlik olive, or Tirilye olive is a variety from the Gemlik, Zeytinbağı area of northern Turkey. Gemlik olives are called the following names as Tirilye, Curly, wrapping paper and black. They are small to medium-sized black olives with a high oil content. This type of olive is very common in Turkey and is sold as a breakfast olive in the cured formats of either Yagli Sele, Salamura or Duble; though there are other less common curings. The sign of a traditionally cured Gemlik olive is that the flesh comes away from the pip easily.

== Synonyms ==
Gemlek, Kaplek, Kivirak, Kaplik, Kara, Kivircik, Samsun Tuzlamalik, Tirilya, Tirilye, Trilia, Trilye, and Trylia.

== Production ==
The oil production is considered high, with a 29.9% yield. There are many olive factories located in Gemlik that export to Western Europe.

A true Gemlik olive should be grown and cured in the Gemlik area. The Marmara sea area climate is considered ideal for olives, with high summer temperatures and cold winters. All Gemlik olives are hand picked between November and February, depending on the crop. A Gemlik olive tree can produce up to forty kilograms of olives in a good year.

Small family growers in the area have been growing, picking and curing Gemlik olives for centuries. Particularly villages, namely Karacaali, Umurbey, Kumla etc. have a history of producing high quality traditionally cured Gemlik olives.

== Marmara Region ==
Gemlik or Tirilye variety is the most widespread one. Of the regional olive groves, 75-80% consists of this variety (Gemlik, Erdek, Mudanya, Edincik, Tirilye), Edincik Su (Bursa, Yalova, Kocaeli), Beyaz Yağlık, Eşek Zeytini, Şam ve Siyah Salamuralık.

== Curing methods ==
With the olive being high in oil, it makes it very versatile in the ways it can be cured. The various curings are as follows:

Yağlı Sele – oil-cured (rotated in drums with a little salt, which agitates the olive and causes it to exude oil). These are then dry stored. Very hard to maintain as the containers need to be rotated on a regular basis. This is a rich, low-salt-tasting olive.

Duble – purely brine-cured olive. The traditional method of curing is to put the olives into two-metre-deep (6.6 ft) vats with weights on the top and brine circulating. The weights tenderize the olives. They are then stored in brine. The more commercial method is to use pressure vats, but this does not produce such a nice texture of olive. This is a firm, salty olive.

Salamura – this is a partially oil-cured olive and then stored in brine.

Kuru Sele – this is dried in a basket of rock salt, which draws all the water from the olive. The longer the olive is left in the salt the firmer the olive becomes. The olive can lose up to half its original weight during curing, giving a crinkly effect. This is a dry store olive and is the least salty tasting. A dry-cured Gemlik olive is a premium olive that carries a high price tag. It is primarily ordered before picking and really is reserved for high-class establishments in Istanbul.

Cross Kuru Sele/Yağlı Sele – this is partially dry-cured, then put through the Yağlı Sele process, which leaves a crinkly, slightly bitter olive. This is also dry stored. These are only cured for personal use by the growers.
