= Belkahve Pass =

Mountain pass in İzmir, Turkey

Belkahve is a mountain pass in İzmir Province, Turkey.

Belkahve is situated 25 kilometres (16 mi) east of İzmir on the highway D.300 connecting İzmir to hinterland. Its coordinates are 38°27′21″N 27°19′20″E and the maximum elevation is 268 metres (879 ft). As the average elevation of Turkey is over 1,000 metres (3,300 ft), Belkahve is considered a low-altitude pass. It is the first point on the way from Central Anatolia to İzmir to watch İzmir and the Aegean Sea. During the Turkish War of Independence, after three years of occupation, the nationalists, including Atatürk, watched İzmir from this point on 8–9 September 1922. A monument has been erected to commemorate the incident.
