= Gulf of Gemlik =

Inlet of the Sea of Marmara, Turkey

Coordinates: 40.4000°N 29.0000°E

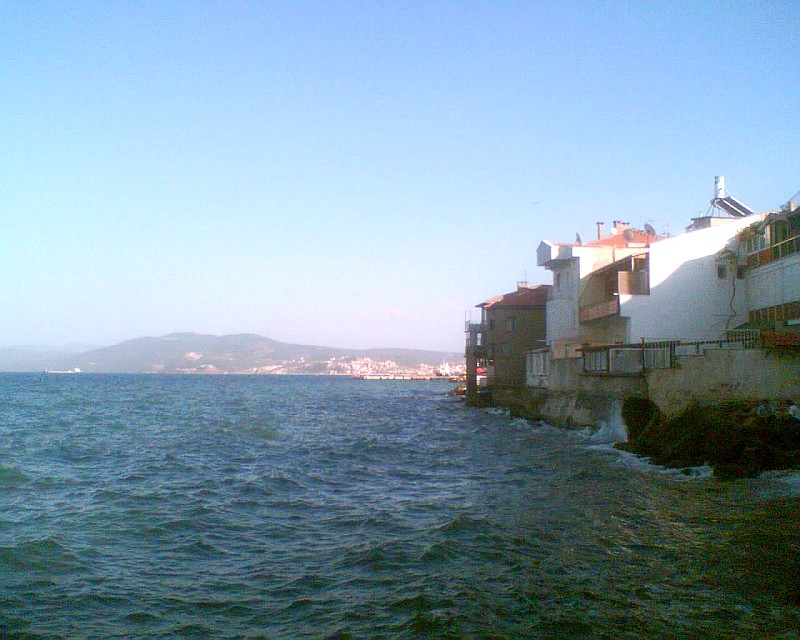
Gulf of Gemlik as seen from the town of Mudanya.

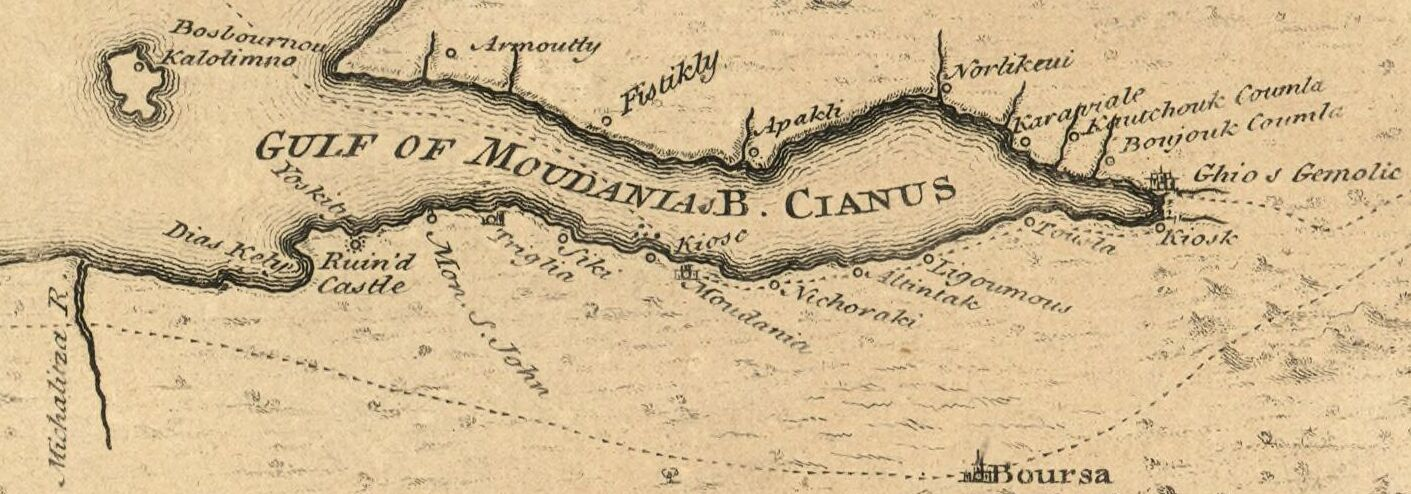
Gulf of Moudania map by Thomas Jefferys (18th-century)

The Gulf of Gemlik (Turkish: Gemlik Körfezi) is an inlet of the Sea of Marmara in the Marmara region of Turkey. The gulf is located in the southeastern part of the sea. Mudanya, Gemlik and Armutlu are the major towns surrounding the gulf.
