= Taşköprü, Yalova =

Taşköprü
- Municipality
- Location in Turkey Taşköprü (Marmara)
- Coordinates: 40°41′N 29°24′E
- Country: Turkey
- Province: Yalova
- District: Çiftlikköy
- Elevation: 20 m (70 ft)
- Population (2022): 4,271
- Time zone: UTC+3 (TRT)
- Postal code: 77600
- Area code: 0226

Taşköprü (literally "stone bridge") is a coastal town (belde) in Çiftlikköy District of Yalova Province, Turkey. Its population is 4,271 (2022). Taşköprü is situated on a peninsula. It is 6 kilometres (3.7 mi) from Çiftlikköy on the Turkish state highway D.575. Taşköprü was founded by a group of Turkish families from Bulgaria (which had recently gained independence) in 1902. The name of the settlement refers to a 400-year-old Ottoman bridge at the east of the town.
