= Teşvikiye, Çınarcık =

Teşvikiye
- Municipality
- Location in Turkey Teşvikiye (Marmara)
- Coordinates: 40°37′49″N 29°04′55″E
- Country: Turkey
- Province: Yalova
- District: Çınarcık
- Population (2022): 3,158
- Time zone: UTC+3 (TRT)

Teşvikiye is a town (belde) in the Çınarcık District, Yalova Province, Turkey. Its population is 3,158 (2022).
