= Esenköy, Çınarcık =

Esenköy
- Municipality
- Location in Turkey Esenköy (Marmara)
- Coordinates: 40°37′11″N 28°57′19″E
- Country: Turkey
- Province: Yalova
- District: Çınarcık
- Population (2022): 3,996
- Time zone: UTC+3 (TRT)

Esenköy is a town (belde) in the Çınarcık District, Yalova Province, Turkey. Its population is 3,996 (2022).
