= Gemlik =

- District and municipality
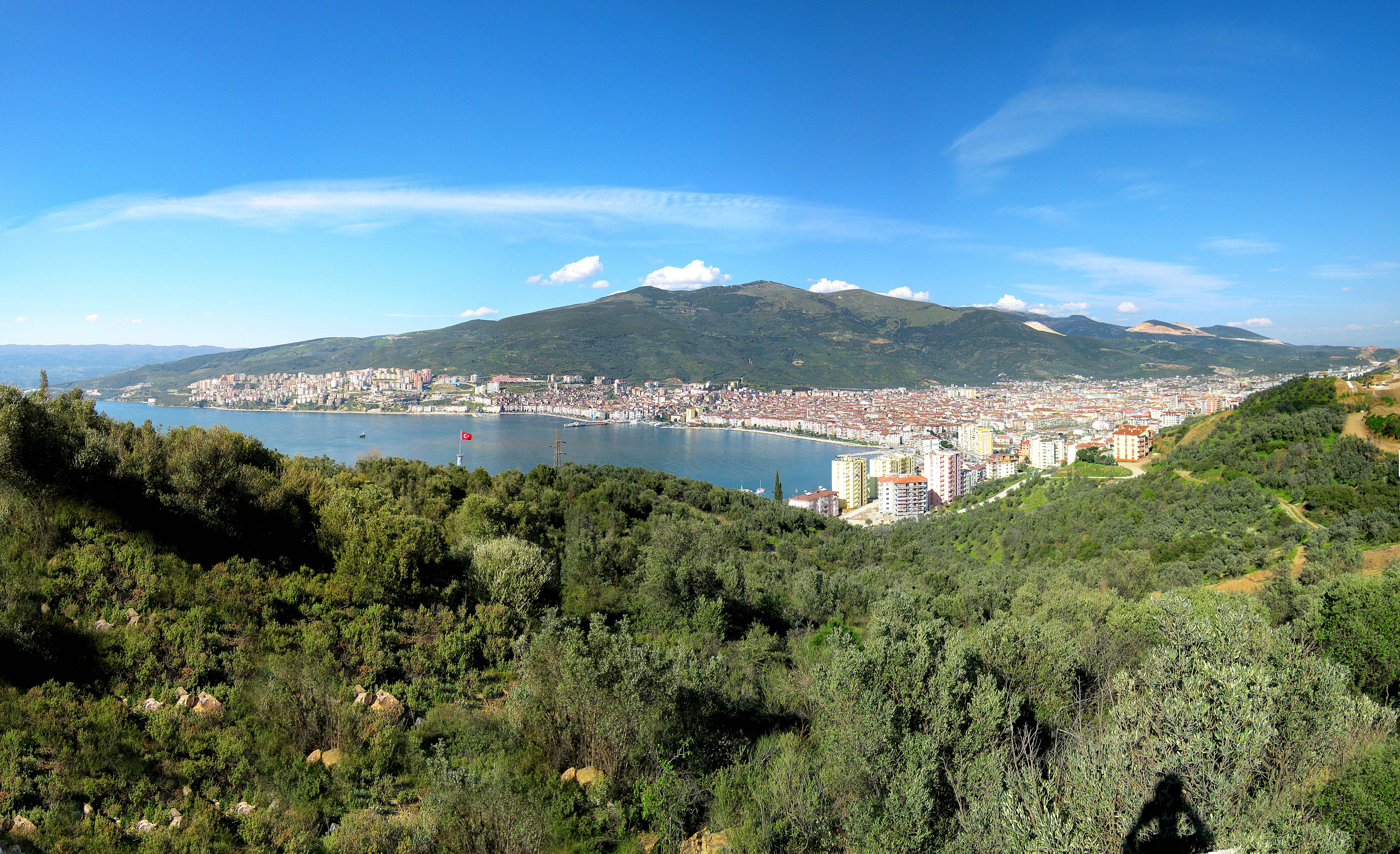

- Map showing Gemlik District in Bursa Province

- Location within Turkey Location within Marmara
- Coordinates: 40°25′54″N 29°09′22″E
- Country: Turkey
- Province: Bursa

Government
  - Mayor: Şükrü Deviren (CHP)
- Area: 401 km^{2} (155 sq mi)
- Elevation: 22 m (72 ft)
- Population (2025): 124,400
  - Density: 310/km^{2} (803/sq mi)
- Time zone: UTC+3 (TRT)
- Postal code: 16600
- Area code: 0224
- Website: www.gemlik.bel.tr

Gemlik is a municipality and district of Bursa Province, Turkey. Its area is 401 km^{2}, and its population is 124,400 (2025). It is located in the east of the Gulf of Gemlik. It is approximately 29 km (18 mi) away from Bursa. In antiquity, Gemlik was the location of the ancient Greek town of Cius.

Gemlik has a trade port and a freezone trade center. There are also important industrial establishments in the south and west of the harbors. The port of Gemlik is one of the busiest import harbors in Turkey. Gemlik is renowned for black olives.

== Etymology ==
In the Ottoman era, the town began to be called Gemilik (Eng. shipyard), because of a shipyard in the town that built Galleons for the Ottoman Navy.

As of 1920, the British were calling Gemlik, Geumlek in publications.

== History ==
=== Ancient history ===
Gemlik was the site of the ancient Greek city of Cius (/ˈsaɪəs/; Greek: Kίος or Κῖος Kios), later renamed Prusias on the Sea (/ˈpruːʒəs/; Latin: Prusias ad Mare) after king Prusias I of Bithynia, was an ancient Greek city bordering the Propontis (now known as the Sea of Marmara), in Bithynia and formerly in Mysia (in modern northwestern Turkey), and had a long history, being mentioned by Herodotus, Xenophon, Aristotle, Strabo and Apollonius Rhodius. It was strategically placed at the head of a gulf in the Propontis, called the gulf of Cius, or Cianus Sinus. Herodotus calls it Cius of Mysia; and also Xenophon, from which it appears that Mysia, even in Xenophon's time, extended at least as far east as the head of the gulf of Cius. Pliny the Elder reports that Cius was a Milesian colony. It was at the foot of Mount Arganthonius, and there was a myth that Hylas, one of the companions of Heracles on the voyage to Colchis, was carried off by the nymphs when he went to get water here; and also that Cius, another companion of Heracles, on his return from Colchis, stayed here and founded the city, to which he gave his name. Pliny mentions a river Hylas and a river Cius here, one of which reminds us of the name of the youth who was stolen by the nymphs, and the other of the mythical founder. The Cius may be the channel by which the lake Ascania discharges its waters into the gulf of Cius; though Pliny speaks of the Ascanium flumen as flowing into the gulf, and we must assume that he gives this name to the channel which connects the lake and the sea. If the river Cius is not identical with this channel, it must be a small stream near Cius. As Ptolemy speaks of the outlets of the Ascanius, it has been conjectured that there may have been two, and that they may be the Hylas and Cius of Pliny; but the plural ἐκβολαί does not necessarily mean more than a single mouth; and Pliny certainly says that the Ascanius flows into the gulf. However, his geography is a constant cause of difficulty. The position of Cius made it the port for the inland parts, and it became a place of much commercial importance. Pomponius Mela calls it the most convenient emporium of Phrygia, which was at no great distance from it.

Cius was taken by the Persians, after the burning of Sardis, in 499 BCE. It joined the Aetolian League, and was destroyed by Philip V of Macedon in the Second Macedonian War (200–197 BCE), and given by him to Prusias I of Bithynia. Prusias, who had assisted Philip in ruining Cius, restored it under the name of Prusias (Προυσιάς). It was sometimes called Prusias ἐπιθαλασσίη, or "on the sea," to distinguish it from other towns of the same name, or πρὸς θάλασσαν. In the text of Memnon the reading is Cierus; but Memnon, both in this and other passages, has confounded Cius and Cierus. But it is remarked that Cius must either have still existed by the side of the new city, or must have recovered its old name; for Pliny mentions Cius, and also Mela, Zosimus, and writers of a still later date. It was an important chain in the ancient Silk Road and became known as a wealthy town.

There are coins of Cius, with the legend Κιανων, belonging to the Roman imperial period; and there are coins of Prusias with the epigraph, Προυσιεων των προς θαλασσαν.

Cius became an early Christian bishopric. Its bishop, Cyrillus, took part in the First Council of Nicaea in 325, and Theosebius attended the Council of Ephesus. The names of many of his successors in the first millennium are known from extant contemporary documents. At first a suffragan of Nicomedia, it soon became an autocephalous archdiocese in the Byzantine Empire, being listed as such in Notitiae Episcopatuum from the 7th century onward. No longer a residential bishopric, Cius is today listed by the Catholic Church as a titular see. The town was lost to the Ottoman Empire in 1333.

=== Modern history ===
From 1867 until 1922, Gemlik was part of Hüdavendigâr vilayet. In 1891, 5147 people lived in the town center including; 4620 Greeks, 242 Turks, 107 Armenian and 178 others. As of 1920, Gemlik was estimated to have a population of 5,000. At that time, it had a naval yard that was no longer in use.

On 11 September 1922, Gemlik's remaining Greek citizens left Gemlik (known as Kios to Greeks) and resettled in Nea Kios, Greece due to population exchange between Turkey and Greece.

== Geography ==
Gemlik was built on a plain which is bordered on three sides by mountains, with the Samanli Mountains lying from southeast to the northwest. There is a large plain spanning much of the east end of Gemlik to the coast. Karsak Stream, which originates at Lake Iznik, divides this plain and town center into two parts.

The Gulf of Gemlik, often called fig port of Kilyos (in reference to the ancient name of the town), is 35 km from east to west, 10–15 km from north to south, and 100–150 meters deep. For many years, this gulf had been used for docking ships, but now it serves as a tourist attraction.

The largest river in the area is Karsak, gurgles from İznik Lake and spilles to Gulf of Gemlik.

In rural areas of Gemlik District mostly covered by olive trees and pines on the Samanlı Mountains.

=== Composition ===
There are 35 neighbourhoods in Gemlik District:

- Adliye
- Ata
- Balıkpazarı
- Büyükkumla
- Cihatlı
- Cumhuriyet
- Demirsubaşı
- Dr.Ziya Kaya
- Engürücük
- Eşref Dinçer
- Fevziye
- Fındıcak
- Gençali
- Güvenli
- Halitpaşa
- Hamidiye
- Hamidiyeköy
- Haydariye
- Hisar
- Karacaali
- Katırlı
- Kayhan
- Küçükkumla
- Kumla
- Kurşunlu
- Kurtul
- Muratoba
- Narlı
- Orhaniye
- Osmaniye
- Şahinyurdu
- Şükriye
- Umurbey
- Yeniköy
- Yenimahalle

=== Climate ===
Gemlik has a hot-summer Mediterranean climate (Köppen climate classification: Csa) with cool and rainy winters, and hot and dry summers. The driest month is July with an average of 22 mm (0.87 in) of rainfall. The wettest month is December with an average of 98 mm (3.9 in) of precipitation. Although a Mediterranean climate generally prevails in the district of Gemlik, the higher elevations have an Oceanic climate (Köppen climate classification: Cfb). The record high temperature is 42.6 °C (109 °F) and the record low temperature is −10.0 °C (14 °F). The annual precipitation ranges between 456.2 mm (17.96 in) and 1,217.4 mm (47.93 in). There are an average 113 days with precipitation. The warmest month of the year is July, with an average temperature of 23.3 °C (74 °F). The coldest month of the year is January, with an average temperature of 5.8 °C (42 °F).

== Administration and Politics ==
=== Local Elections ===
Mayors of Gemlik
Yıl	Belediye Başkanı	Parti	Oy Oranı
1977	İbrahim Akıt	AP	%55,58
1984	İsmail Hakkı Çakır	ANAP	%37,90
1989	Nezih Dimili	SHP	%29,66
1994	Nurettin Avcı	ANAP	%27,95
1999	Mehmet Turgut	FP	%24,28
2004	Mehmet Turgut	AK Parti	%32,46
2009	Fatih Mehmet Güler	CHP	%32,40
2014	Refik Yılmaz	AK Parti	%38,80
2019	Mehmet Uğur Sertaslan	CHP	%47,25

== Tourism ==
Kumla is one of the busiest resorts in Marmara in summer period. Especially people from Istanbul prefer to take their holidays in Kumla because it is one of the nearest resorts to Istanbul. There are also smaller resorts like Büyükkumla, Karacaali and Narlı along the north coast of the gulf. Road to these resorts split from Yalova-Bursa state road to Gemlik beltway through Kumla. Sudüşen waterfall is in the north of the village of Haydariye. There is also a moto-cross tournament organised at Şahintepe point on the Samanlı Mountains and Olive Festival at city in August–September.

== Economy ==
Industrial establishments that produce plastic, textile, marble, chemistry, machinery, automotive, steel and fertilizers continue their activities in the district. Large-scale industrial facilities in Gemlik are concentrated on the western coastline of the district, especially in and around the free zone.

80% of the population living in the district center is engaged in trade. Salt olive, oil, soap trade is the leading. Olive production has an important place in Gemlik industry.

Turkey's first cannery Rifat Minaret Koller. Sti. In parallel with the establishment of canning, vegetable growing has developed. Bean, artichoke, cucumber, tomato, pea, eggplant, pepper are the leading vegetables grown.

A significant portion of the economic revenues are from the agriculture and industry sectors. Olive production; Although it has a large share in terms of the area it covers, it has a high share in terms of economic input it provides in agricultural production. The production is not only consumed in domestic markets, but also exports. There are 2 small industrial sites in the district. 664 workplaces operate in industrial sites. There are also 1 free zone and 2 small industrial sites in Gemlik. There are 87 companies in the free zone, 64 domestic, 11 foreign and 12 domestic-foreign partners. 9937 workers work in the Free Zone.

In 2017 the region from Turkey TL 285,933,564.63. While there TL 282,535,527.42 in 2018 the volume of transactions, the region from Turkey in 2017 to various parts of TL 146,881,502.72. In 2018, 184,858,595.49 TL trading volume occurred. Transaction volume change rate has been realized as (+25,86). When Free Zone Trade data is analyzed, in the same period, from abroad to the region in 2017, 430.902.457,11 TL. In 2018, 515.423.870,72 TL. input is provided. The rate of change during this period was (+19.61). Bursa Free Zone has a trade volume of 1,918,150,680.25 ($) dollars. 12.263.822.782,51 ($) of this amount consists of exports, and 8.457.276.393,26 ($) part of it imports.

The tax collection of the Customs Directorate for 2017 is 376.190.027 TL, and the 2018 tax collection is 466.696.342 TL. The annual rate of change is 24.06. The VAT collection for 2017 is 3.787.643.808 TL, the VAT collection for 2018 is 4.235.680.882 TL. The annual rate of change is 11.83. A total of 245.820.971 TL in 2017–2018. antidumping tax has been obtained. While a fine of 151,070,873 TL was applied in 2017, a fine of 111,104,167 TL was imposed in 2018.

The data of the ports in the district in 2018 are shown in the table below. There are 5 ports in Gemlik. 223 incoming ships, 214 outgoing ships; There are 31 incoming passengers, 53 outgoing passengers and 26,928 incoming vehicles, 31,223 outgoing vehicles.

The total number of taxpayers in the district is 34,576, Tax Accrual is 695,593,681 TL. Tax collection is 375.865.977 TL. d. The Collection / Accrual ratio is 54.04.

There are 2 artisan rooms in Gemlik. The number of members registered in the chambers of trades is 3.227. In addition, there is 1 Commodity Exchange and the number of registered members is 223.

In the district, besides large industrial facilities such as the under construction TOGG Turkish national car factory, Borçelik, Borusan, MKS Marmara, Çimtaş, Gemlik Gübre, there are many international organizations such as Ficosa, Yazaki, Aunde Vibracoistic, Techno Stell, Summit Stell, AB Rothec.

A total of 25,000 people work in the free zone, of which 15,000 are employed, and other industrial facilities are 10,000.

Automotive, iron-steel, electric-electronic, textile and marble are among the most exported sectors. The most exported countries are Germany, Romania, Spain, France and England.

== Health ==
There are 2 hospitals in Gemlik: 1 State Hospital and 1 Private Hospital. There are 260 beds in the State Hospital and 7 267 beds in the Private Hospital. There are 9 Family Health Centers and 4 Health Houses.

There are 109 Doctors in the State Hospital, 59 GPs, 50 Specialist Doctors. In addition, 8 Dentists work. The number of people per doctor is 990. The number of beds per 10,000 people is 38. There are 4 ambulances in 112 Emergency Call Centers in the district and 5 in the hospital.

While the number of beds in 2016 and 2017 in our district State Hospital was 128, it was 260 in 2018. The number of inpatients is 10059 in 2018 and the total number of surgeries in 2018 is 9531. While the normal birth in our district was 91 in 2016, 34 in 2017, 92 in 2018, birth by cesarean in 2016 was 193, 106 in 2017 and 92 in 2018. 0–1 year old infant death is 2.

As of 2018, the hospital has 41 polyclinics, 40 normal and 1 emergency, and 34 Family Physicians.

A total of 159 suicide cases occurred in the district, 28 in 2016, 60 in 2017 and 71 in 2018. In 2017, there was an increase of more than a hundred percent in cases of crude suicide compared to 2016. This number increased to 71 in 2018.

Cigarette inspections are carried out periodically by the related commission and in line with the incoming notifications. Administrative fines related to smoking are given to business owners who act against the legislation.

== Media and Press ==
- Gemlik Haberci (Gemlik's first news site)
- Gemlik Gazetesi (first newspaper in Gemlik-1958)
- Gemlik Haber Gazetesi (daily paper)
- Gemlik Körfez Gazetesi (first daily paper in Gemlik)
- Gemlik Gündem Gazetesi (daily paper)
- Gio Detay Dergi (monthly news actual magazine)
- Gemlik Life (digital paper of Gemlik)
- Gemlik Haber (internet news)

== Sports ==
=== Sport Clubs in Gemlik ===
- Gemlik Basketbol (Turkish Basketball Second League)
- Gemlikspor (Football/Soccer)
- Umurspor (Football/Soccer)
- Körfezspor (Football/Soccer)
- Zeytinspor (Basketball)
- Gücümspor (Basketball).

== Notable natives ==
- Giannis Papaioannou (1913–1972), Greek Rebetika singer and composer
- Celal Bayar (1883–1986), 3rd President of the Republic of Turkey. Born in town of Umurbey.

== Sister cities ==
- Lauderhill, Florida, United States,
- Novadari, Romania

== Gallery ==
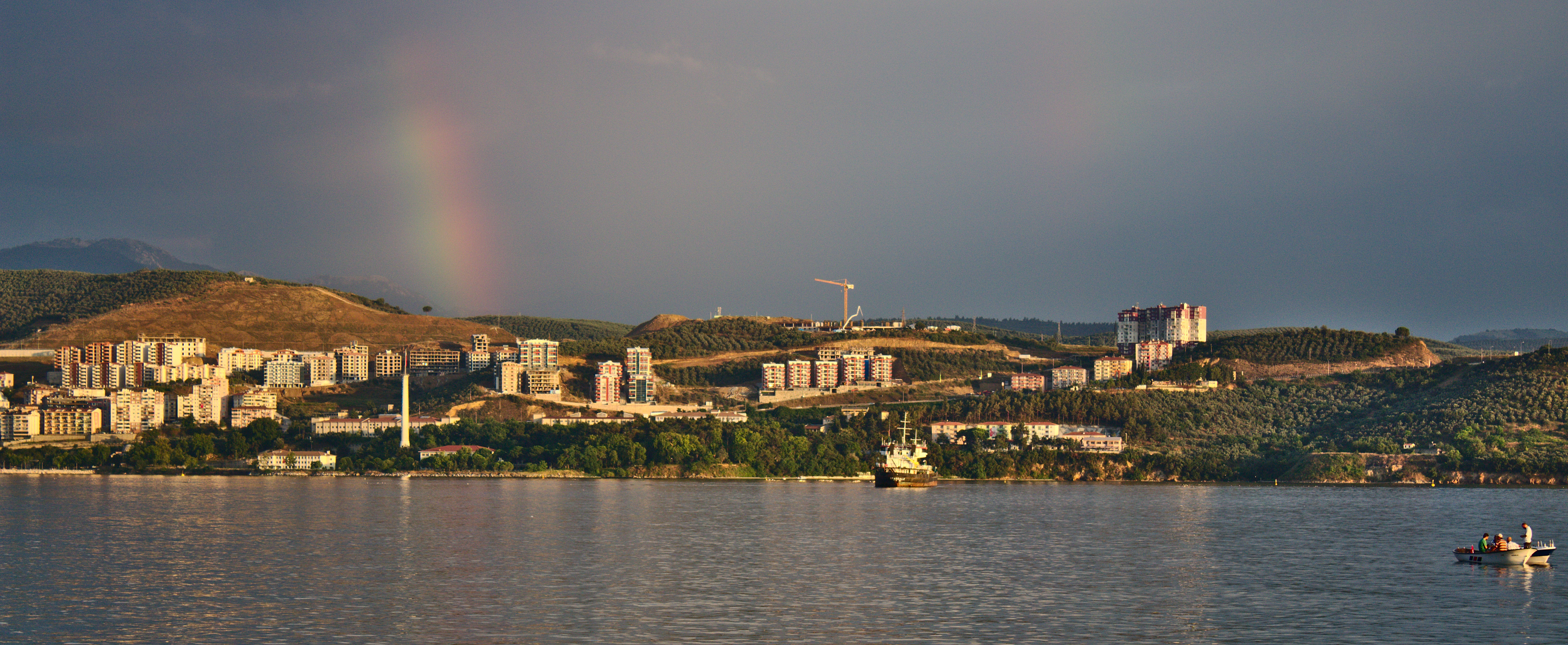
View of Hisartepe from Manastir

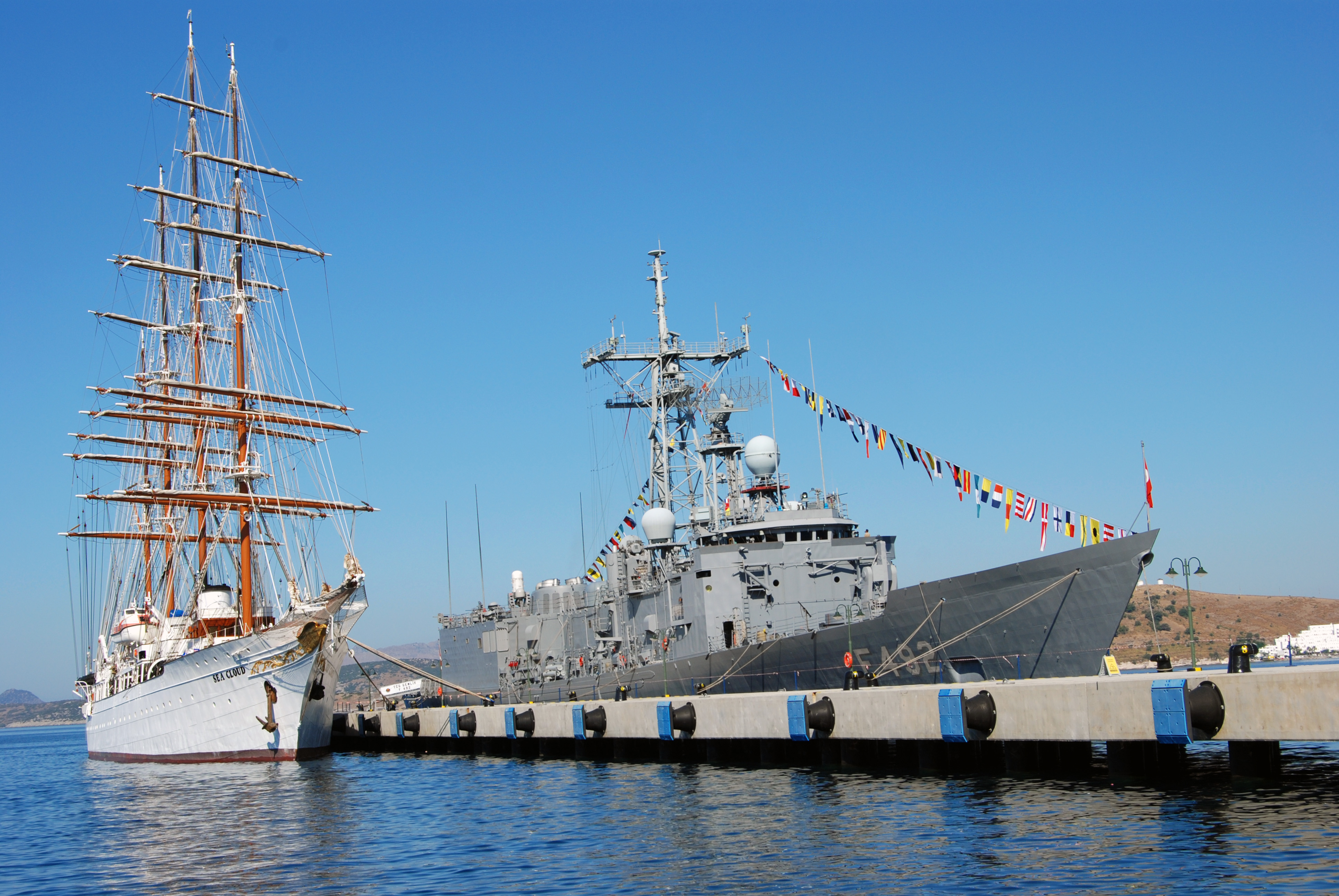
TCG Gemlik docked on Pier

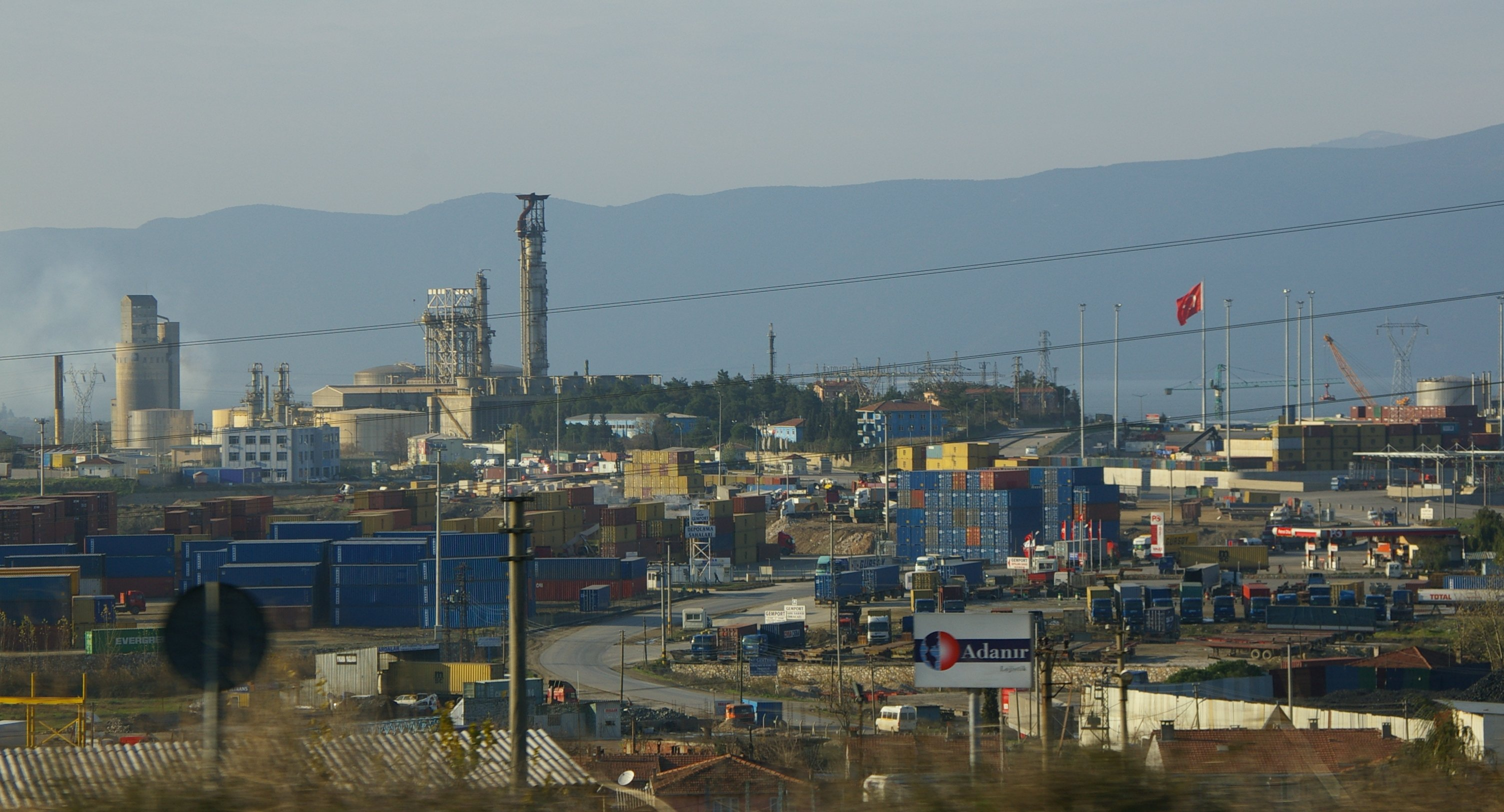
Industrial Zone

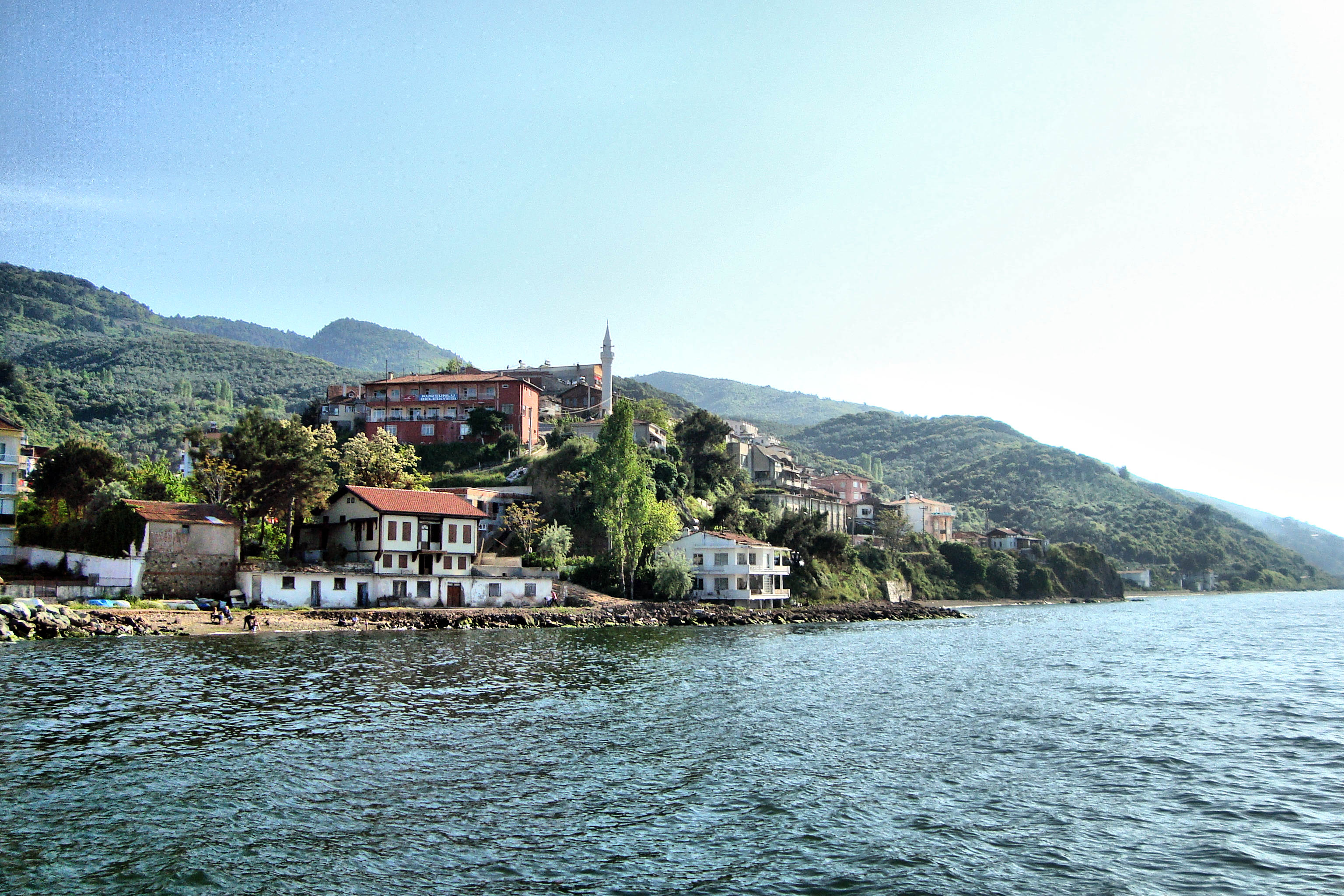
Kurşunlu

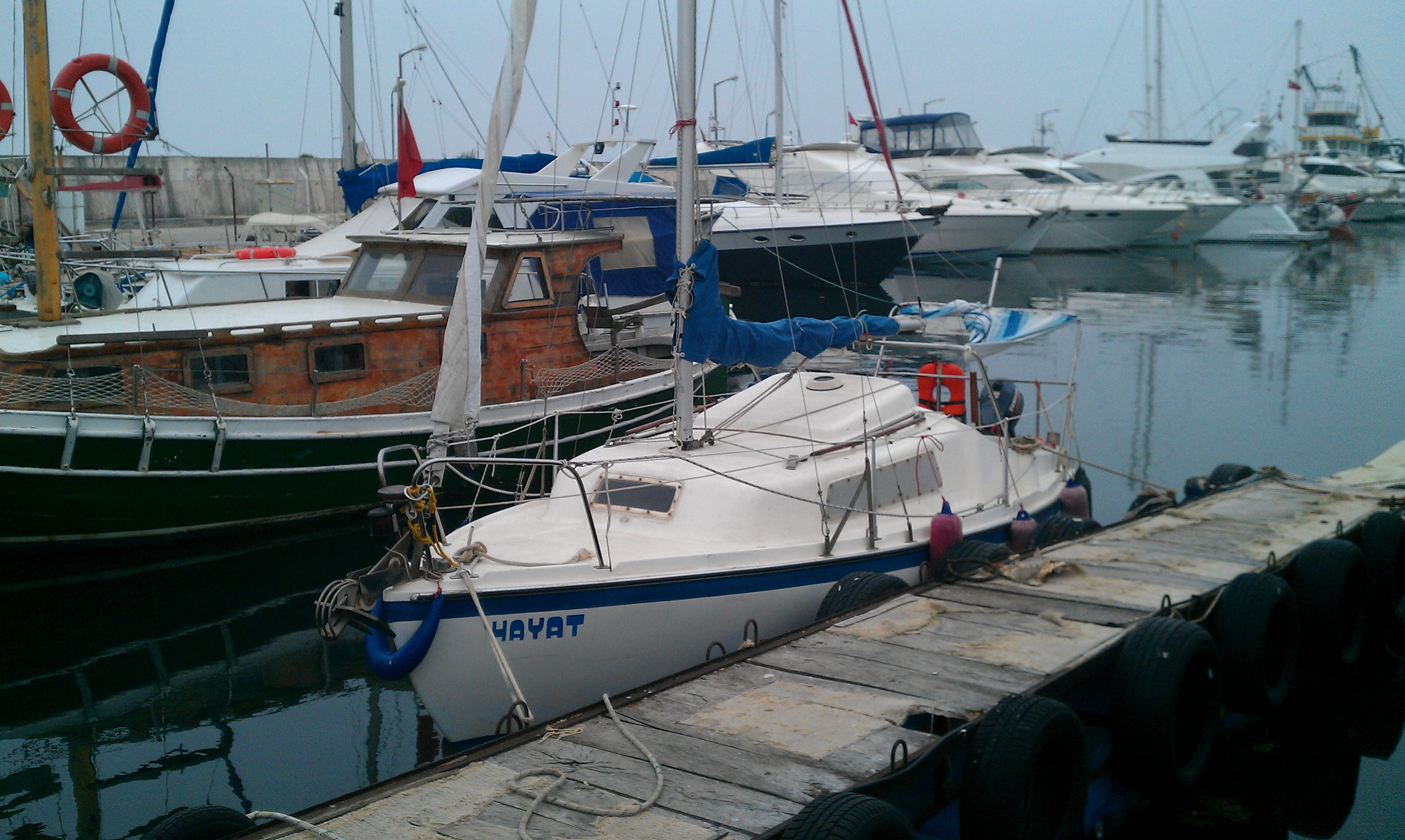
A fishermen shelter in Kurşunlu

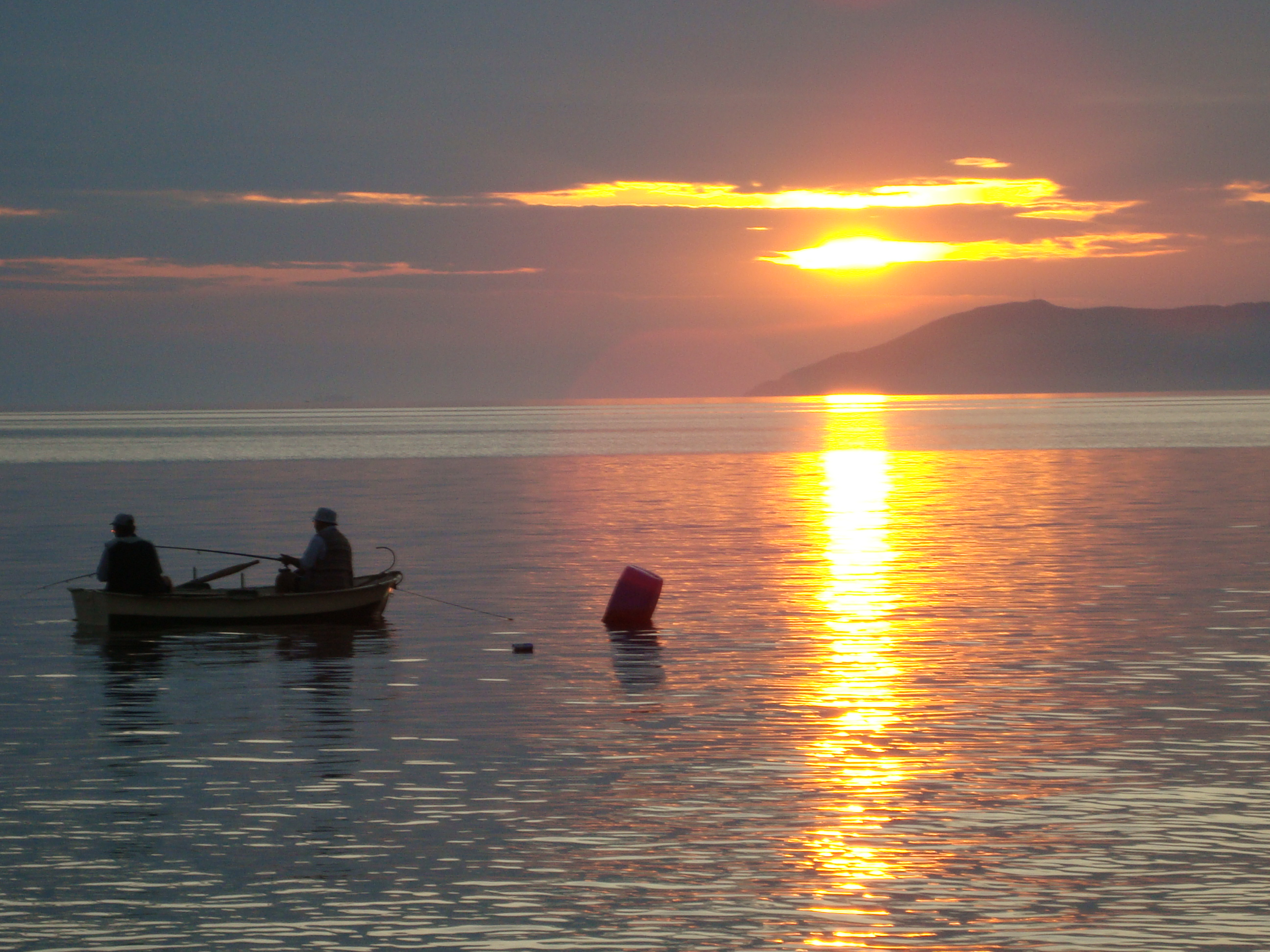
Two fishermen on a boat in the gulf

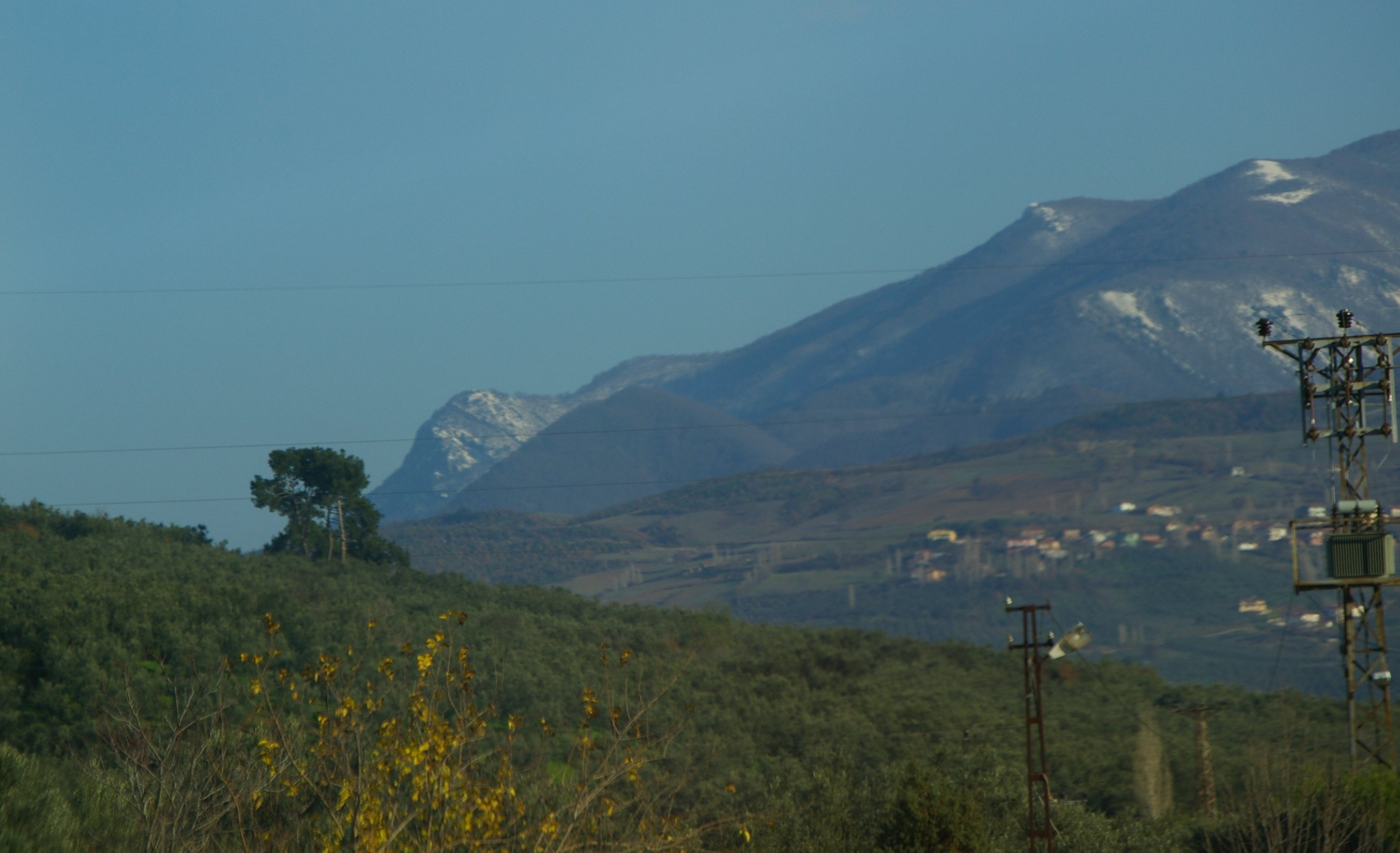
Mount Gürle
