= Çınarcık =

- Municipality
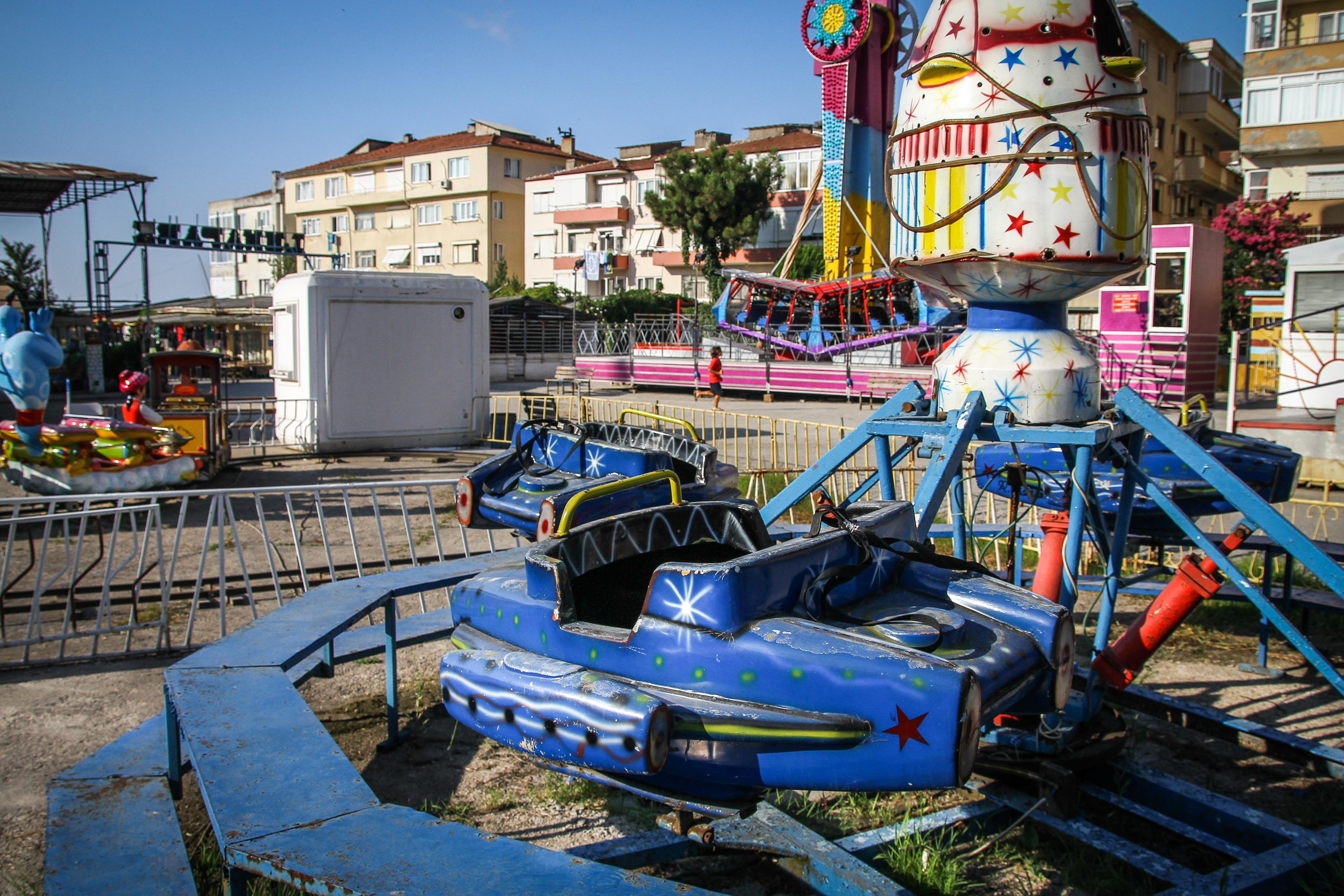

- Location within Turkey Location within Marmara
- Coordinates: 40°38′32″N 29°7′13″E
- Country: Turkey
- Province: Yalova
- District: Çınarcık

Government
  - Mayor: Avni Kurt (CHP)
- Elevation: 11 m (36 ft)
- Population (2022): 20,454
- Time zone: UTC+3 (TRT)
- Postal code: 77300
- Area code: 0226
- Website: www.cinarcik.bel.tr

Çınarcık is a large town in Yalova Province in the Marmara region of Turkey. It is the seat of Çınarcık District. Its population is 20,454 (2022).

Çınarcık has a permanent population of about 20,000 but its location near Istanbul has made it a popular location for summer homes. On hot weekends during the summer, the population can swell to 300,000 and construction of new summer homes in the town is fast-paced. The population drops after summer when seasonal residents leave.

Çınarcık is located on a small strip of flat land on the coast with mountains rising sharply in back of it.

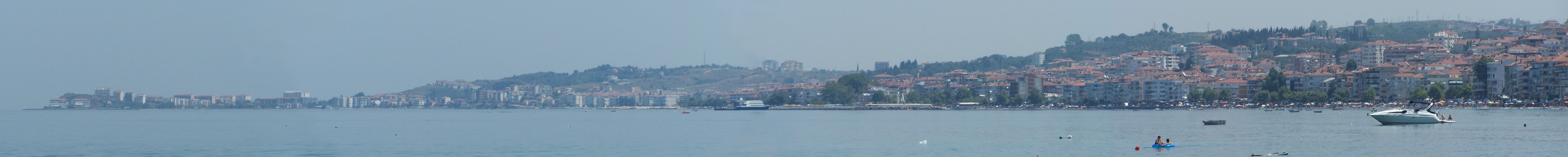
Çınarcık
