= Astaldi =

Former Italian multinational construction company

Astaldi S.p.A.
- Type: S.p.A.
- Industry: Construction
- Founded: 1929; 97 years ago
- Founder: Sante Astaldi
- Fate: Acquired by Webuild
- Successor: Webuild
- Headquarters: Rome, Italy
- Services: Construction of railways, roads and motorways, bridges, metros, airports, tunnels, and hydraulic and hydroelectric power stations
- Revenue: €3.0 billion (2016)
- Operating income: €379.8 million (2016)
- Net income: €97.4 million (2016)
- Number of employees: 11,500 (As of 2016)
- Parent: Webuild
- Website: www.astaldi.com

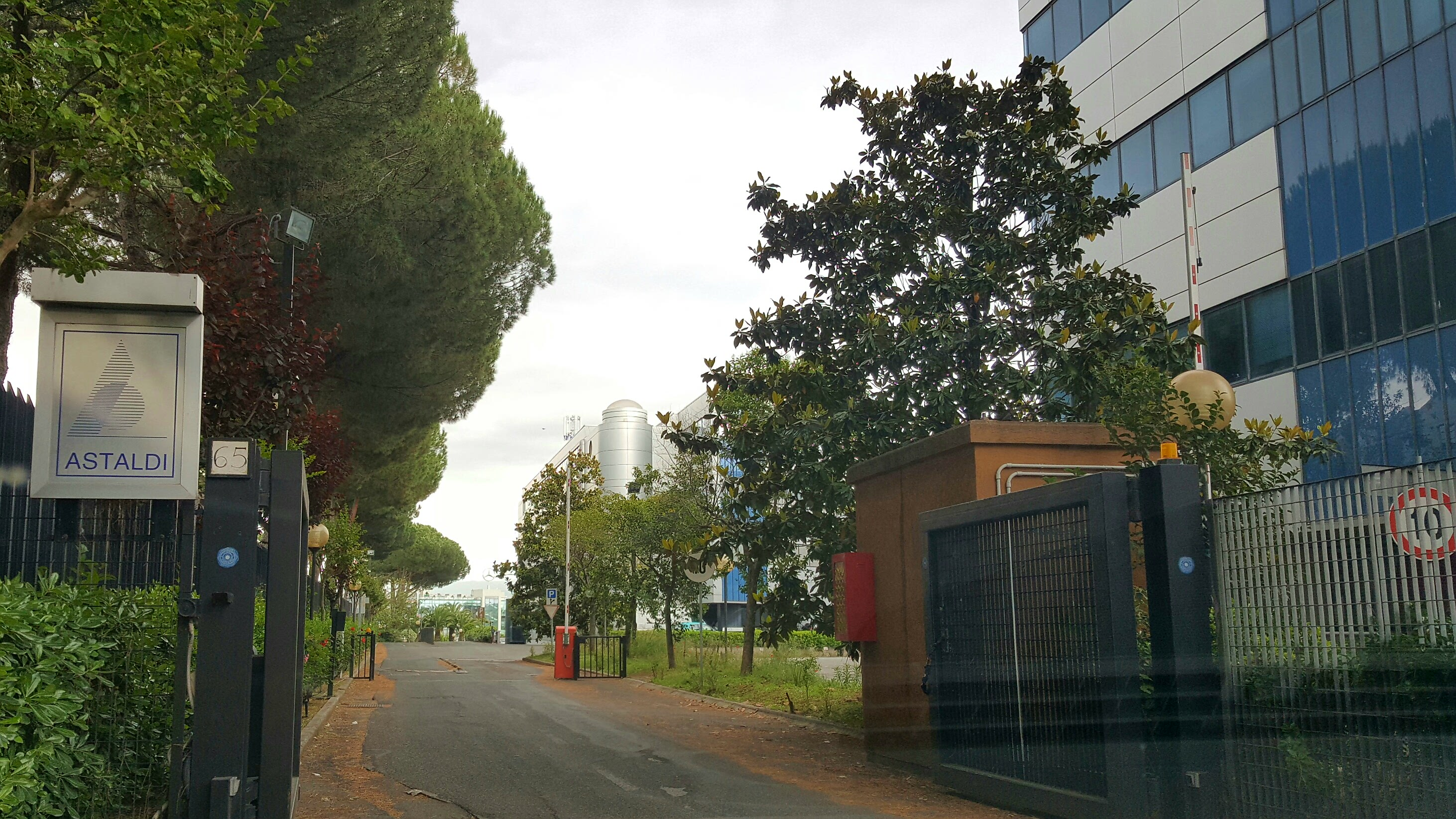
Corporate headquarters in Rome

Astaldi S.p.A. was an Italian multinational construction company based in Rome. It was active in civil engineering, hydraulic engineering, electromechanical engineering and transport infrastructure. It was acquired by Webuild in 2020.

== History ==
The company was founded in 1929 by Sante Astaldi. After the Second World War it expanded into Africa, where it focused on road construction, and between the 1950s and the 1970s it entered the Middle East, Central and South America and the Far East. In 1950 the business was split into two companies, one for foreign markets and one for Italian projects; they merged to form the present-day Astaldi S.p.A. in the 1980s. Through the 1980s and 1990s it entered new markets including the United States, Turkey and Indonesia.

=== Muskrat Falls ===
In May 2016 wooden formwork collapsed during a concrete pour at the Muskrat Falls powerhouse in Labrador, Canada, where Astaldi Canada was the main contractor. Five workers fell into wet concrete. In 2020 a tribunal of the Professional Engineers and Geoscientists of Newfoundland and Labrador found that the company held a permit for civil engineering but not for structural engineering, and that its work on the formwork showed "professional incompetence". Astaldi pleaded guilty and was fined the maximum of C$25,000. The project owner, Nalcor, had removed Astaldi from the project in late 2018.

=== Acquisition by Webuild ===
In November 2020 Webuild completed the acquisition of a 65% stake in Astaldi through a €225 million capital increase.

== Major projects ==
Significant projects included:

=== Italy ===
- Rome Metro, completed in 1955
- Genoa Metro, completed in 1990
- The Lampeggiano Dam, completed in 1992
- Milan Metro, completed in 1999
- The Rosamarina Dam in Sicily, completed in 1999
- The Rome–Naples high-speed line, completed in 2005

=== Romania ===
- Arena Națională, completed in 2011
- Basarab Overpass, completed in 2011

=== Turkey ===
- Mount Bolu Tunnel, a 2,954 m (9,692 ft) road tunnel, completed in 2007
- Golden Horn Metro Bridge, a 936 m (3,071 ft) metro bridge, completed in February 2014
- Yavuz Sultan Selim Bridge, a road-rail bridge over the Bosphorus with a main span of 1,408 m (4,619 ft), completed in August 2016
- Osman Gazi Bridge, a road bridge with a main span of 1,550 m (5,090 ft), completed in 2016

=== Other countries ===
- Caracas Metro, Venezuela, completed in 1983
- Large Electron–Positron Collider for CERN, Switzerland, completed in 1989
- Copenhagen Metro, completed in 2002
- Upgrade of a key stretch of Bulgarian railway infrastructure, completed in 2010
- Second line of the Warsaw Metro, completed in 2013
- New international terminal of Santiago International Airport, Chile, completed in 2021
- Expressway S2 in Warsaw, Poland, completed in 2021
- Versova–Bandra Sea Link in Mumbai, India, planned for completion in 2027
- Dome structure of the Extremely Large Telescope on Cerro Armazones, Chile, for the European Southern Observatory, planned for completion in 2029
