= Çiftlikköy =

- Municipality
- Location within Turkey Location within Marmara
- Coordinates: 40°39′37″N 29°19′25″E
- Country: Turkey
- Province: Yalova
- District: Çiftlikköy

Government
  - Mayor: Ali Murat Silpagar (AKP)
- Elevation: 10 m (33 ft)
- Population (2022): 43,547
- Time zone: UTC+3 (TRT)
- Postal code: 77600
- Area code: 0226
- Website: www.yalovaciftlikkoy.bel.tr

Çiftlikköy is a large town in Yalova Province in the Marmara region of Turkey. It is the seat of Çiftlikköy District. Its population is 43,547 (2022). The mayor is Adil Yele (CHP).
