= Gulf of İzmit =

Gulf at the Marmara Sea, Turkey

Coordinates: 40.74°N 29.65°E

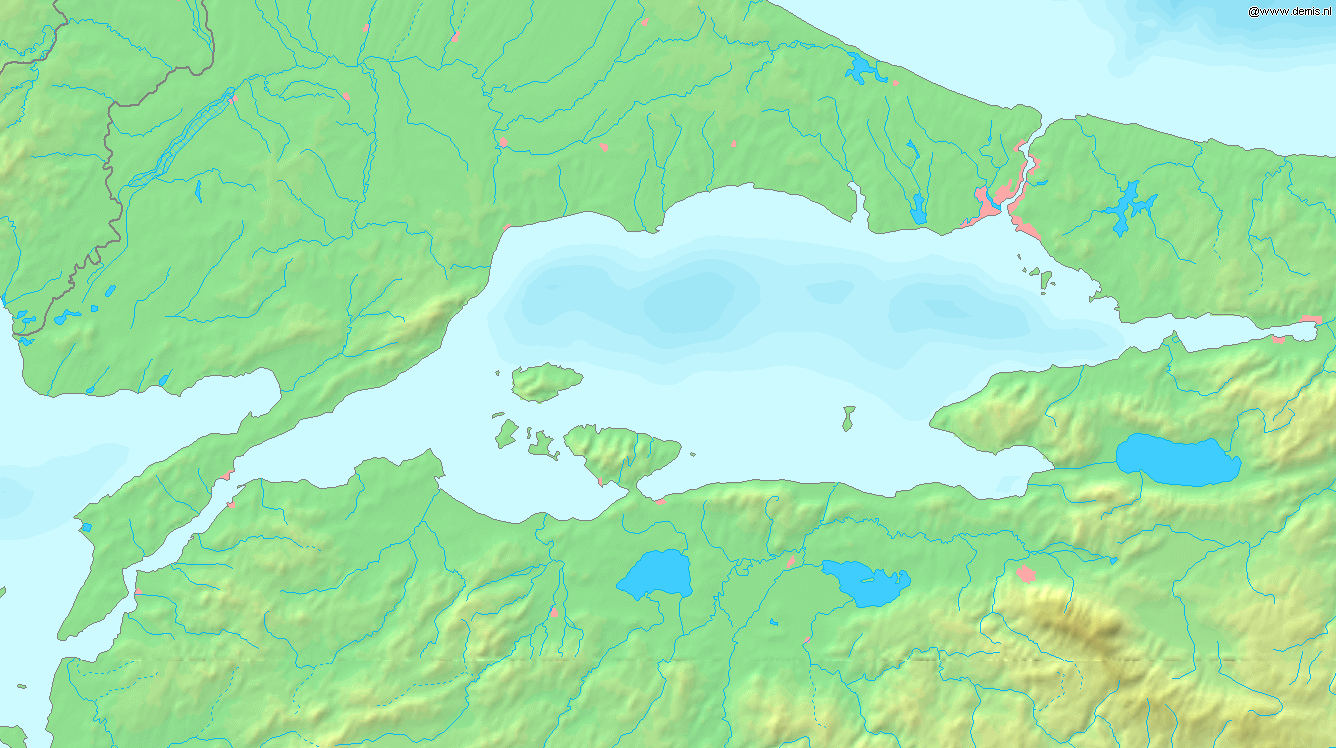
Gulf of İzmit (Sea of Marmara)

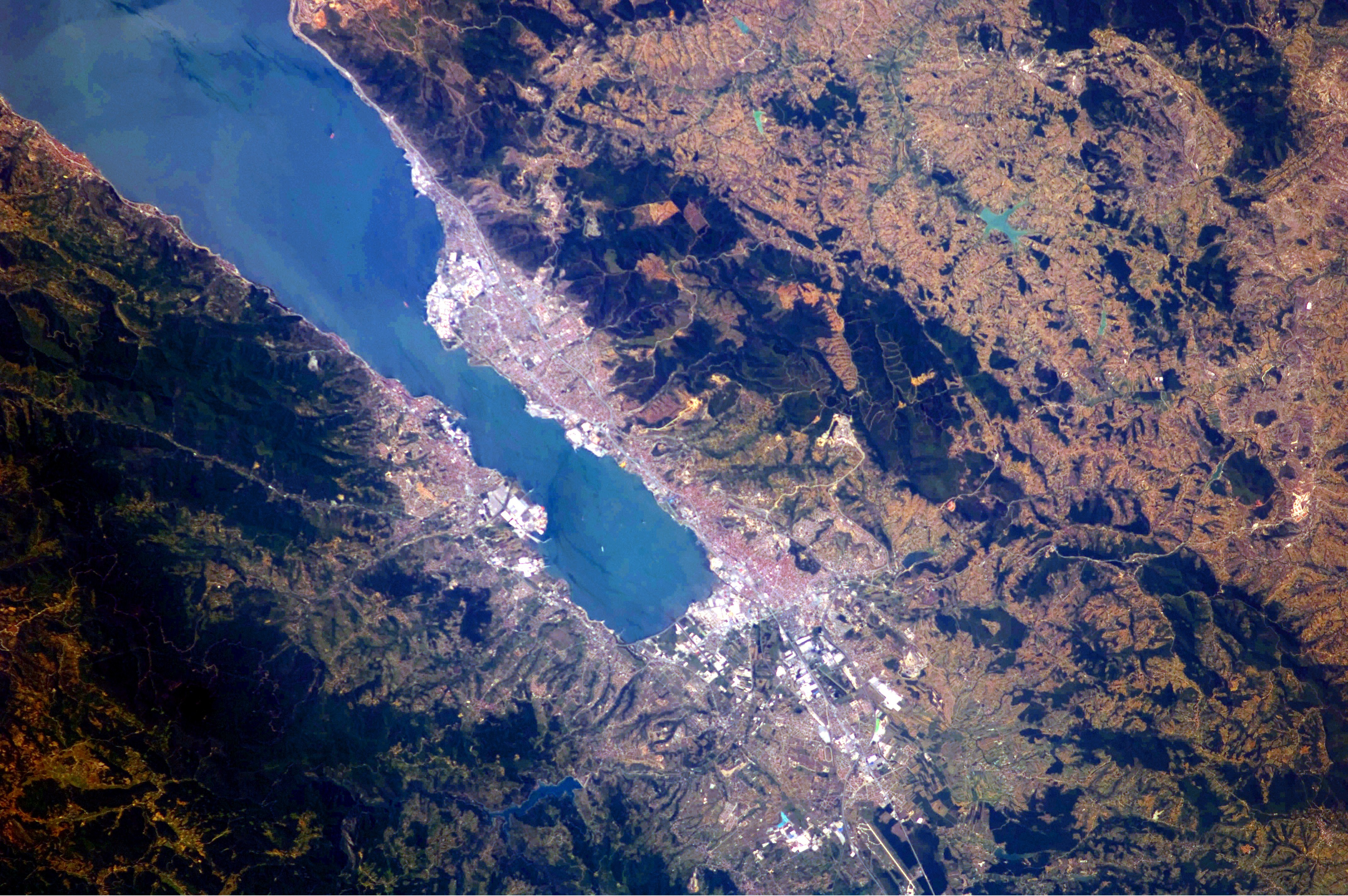
Gulf of İzmit and the city of İzmit

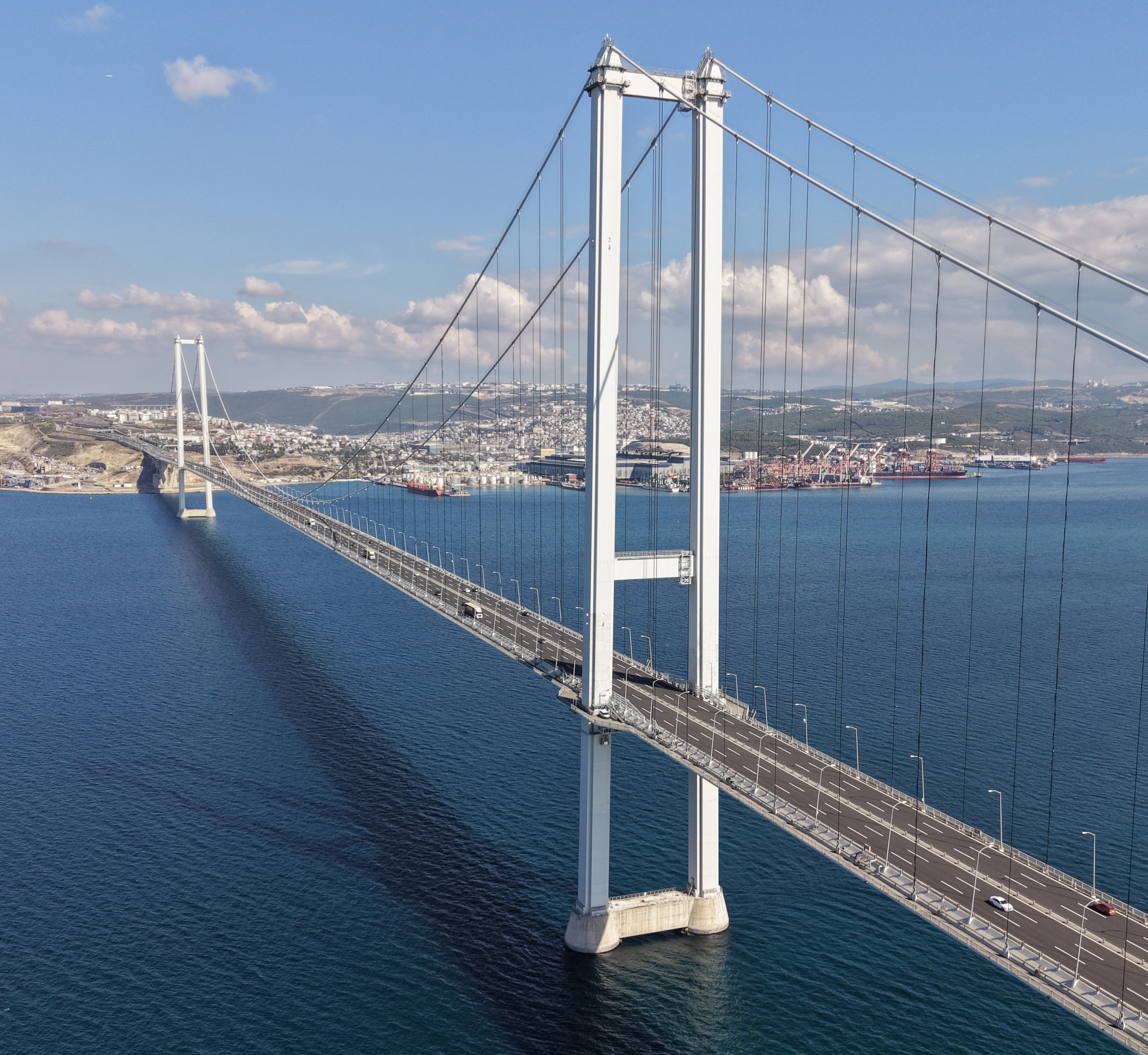
Osman Gazi Bridge on the Gulf of İzmit is one of the longest suspension bridges in the world.

Gulf of İzmit (Turkish: İzmit körfezi), also referred to as İzmit Bay, is a bay at the easternmost edge of the Sea of Marmara, in Kocaeli Province, Turkey. The gulf takes its name from the city of İzmit. Other cities and towns around the bay are Gebze, Körfez, Gölcük, and Altınova.

In the east–west direction, it extends for a length of about 48 kilometres (30 mi), while in the north–south direction its width varies from 2 to 3 kilometres (1.2 to 1.9 mi) at the narrowest spots to about 10 kilometres (6.2 mi) at its widest. The İzmit Bay Bridge is a suspension bridge that bridges the gulf.

The North Anatolian Fault Zone, the most prominent active fault in Turkey and the source of numerous large earthquakes throughout history, passes through the Gulf of İzmit.

== Etymology ==
İzmit’s ancient names were Gulf of Astacus, Sinus Astacenus (Ancient Greek: Ἀστακηνὸς κόλπος), Olbianus Sinus (Ancient Greek: Ὀλβιανὸς κόλπος, romanized: Olbianos kolpos), and Gulf of Nicomedia.

It took the names Gulf of Astacus and Sinus Astacenus from the city Astacus.

== See also ==
- Astacus in Bithynia
- Nicomedia (modern İzmit) – the eastern and most senior capital of the Roman Empire during the Tetrarchy system
- İzmit
- İzmit Bay Bridge
- İzmit Körfez Circuit
