= Altınova =

- Municipality
- Location in Turkey Altınova (Marmara)
- Coordinates: 40°41′51″N 29°30′41″E
- Country: Turkey
- Province: Yalova
- District: Altınova

Government
  - Mayor: Yasemin Fazlaca (AKP)
- Elevation: 15 m (49 ft)
- Population (2022): 9,042
- Time zone: UTC+3 (TRT)
- Postal code: 77700
- Area code: 0226
- Website: www.altinova.bel.tr

Altınova is a town in Yalova Province in the east of Marmara region of Turkey. It is the seat of Altınova District. Its population is 9,042 (2022). The mayor is Yasemin Fazlaca.

== Geography ==
The district is located in the narrowest part of Kocaeli Bay. The coastal part of the district is formed by the Hersek delta formed by Yalakdere. Floristry in Altınova has become a large economic sector.

== Shipyards area ==
The increasing demand for new construction, maintenance and repair in the maritime sector resulted in such a level of orders that could not be met. The establishment of a new center of shipbuilding in Yalova Province became inevitable. The main factor in selecting Yalova for the new shipyard area was its proximity to industrial areas and its location on the transit route of metropolitan cities such as Istanbul, Bursa and Kocaeli. From 2007 on, more and more shipyards were established at the coast of Altınova. As of 2020s, there are over 30 shipyards. The Altinova Shipyard Area was realized as a project by the private sector without any governmental contribution other than the allocation of space. A joint stock company founded in 2004 by more than 40 entrepreneurs in the shipbuilding business was essential in the planning, implementing and coordinating the investments.

Development of Shipbuilding Industry in Altınova, Yalova
Year	No. of completed new ships	No. of ship with completed maintenance/repair works
2008	7	110
2009	21	90
2010	19	170
2011	33	260
2012	41	280
2013	43	340
2014	45	360
2015	41	380
2016	54	534
2017	58	725
2018	60	827
2019	64	885
