= Yalova (disambiguation) =

Yalova is a town in Turkey. Yalova may also refer to

Places in Turkey

- Yalova Atatürk Mansion in Yalova
- Yalova, Eceabat, a village
- Yalova Province
  - Yalova District
  - Yalova University
- Yalova Peninsula

Other

- Jalová, a village and municipality in Slovakia
- Gialova, a village in Greece
- Yalova (surname)
