= Sufi Trail =

Footpath following the Ottoman Sultans Hajj route

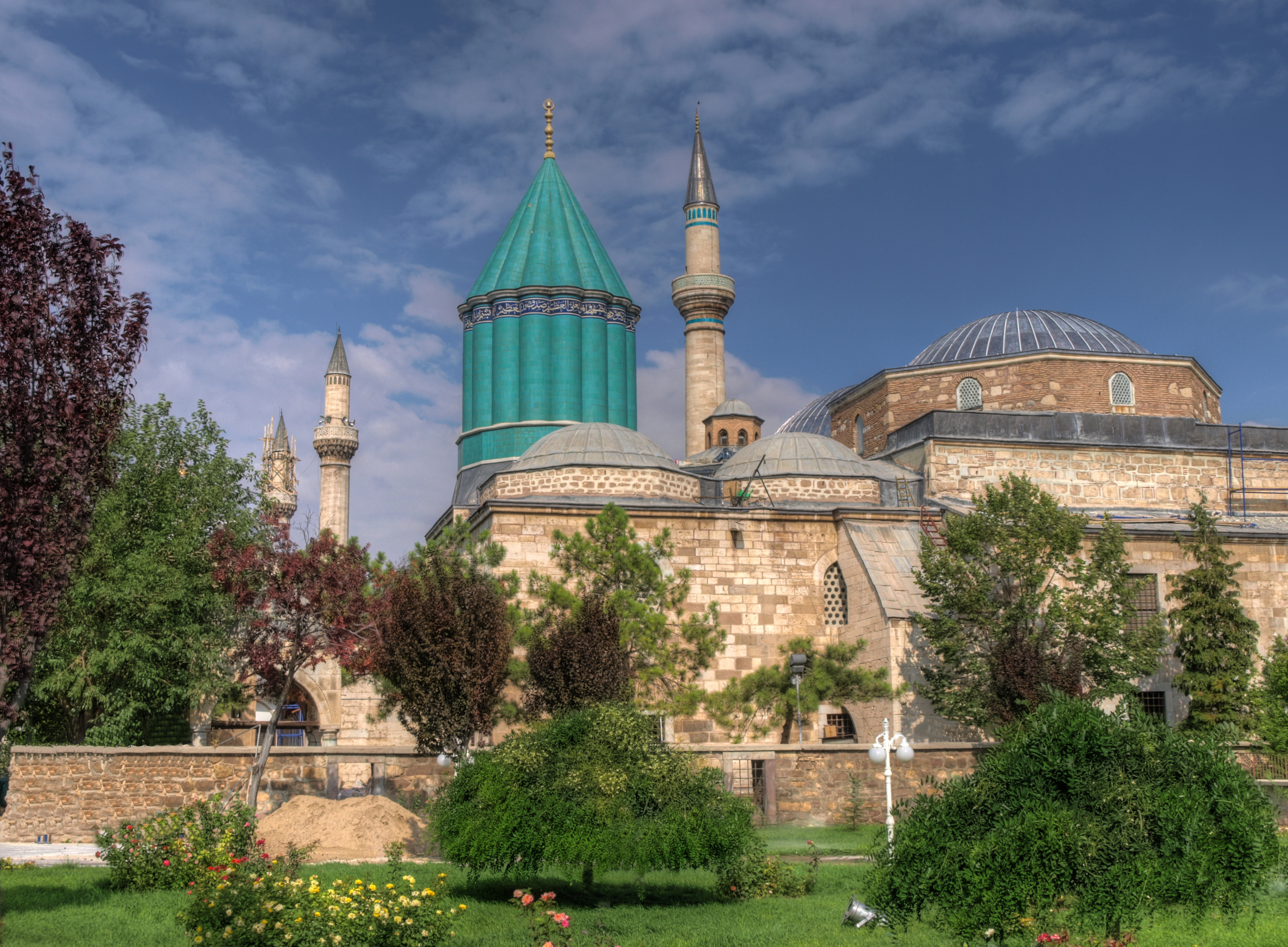
- Mevlana Museum, Konya – end of the walk
- Length: 801 km (498 mi)
- Location: Western Turkey
- Designation: Long distance footpath
- Trailheads: Eyüp, Istanbul; 41.055738°N 28.9375843°E; Mevlana Museum, Konya; 37.8704468°N 32.5041645°E
- Use: Hiking
- Highest point: Emirdede tepesi, 2,064 m (6,772 ft)
- Lowest point: Sea level

The Sufi Trail is an 801-kilometre (498 mi) long-distance footpath in Western Turkey from Istanbul to Konya following the Ottoman Sultans Hajj route. The Sufi Trail connects to the Sultans Trail, a long-distance footpath from Vienna to Istanbul. After Konya Sufi Trail connects with the ancient road to Jerusalem and Mecca via the Mecca Trail in Turkey. This route is traditionally used by dwelling dervishes on their way to Konya and further on to Jerusalem and Mecca. In 801 kilometres, the Sufi Trail visits many Sufi saints and passes spiritual, natural and historical highlights. Retracing this journey provides a place of meeting with people of all faiths and cultures.

== History ==
The Sufi Trail was first described in the 2018 two-part book Sufi Trail: 40 Days to Dervishhood by Iris Bezuijen and Sedat Çakir. The books describe the route in 40 stages, each of which ends at a settlement with usually some overnight accommodation nearby.

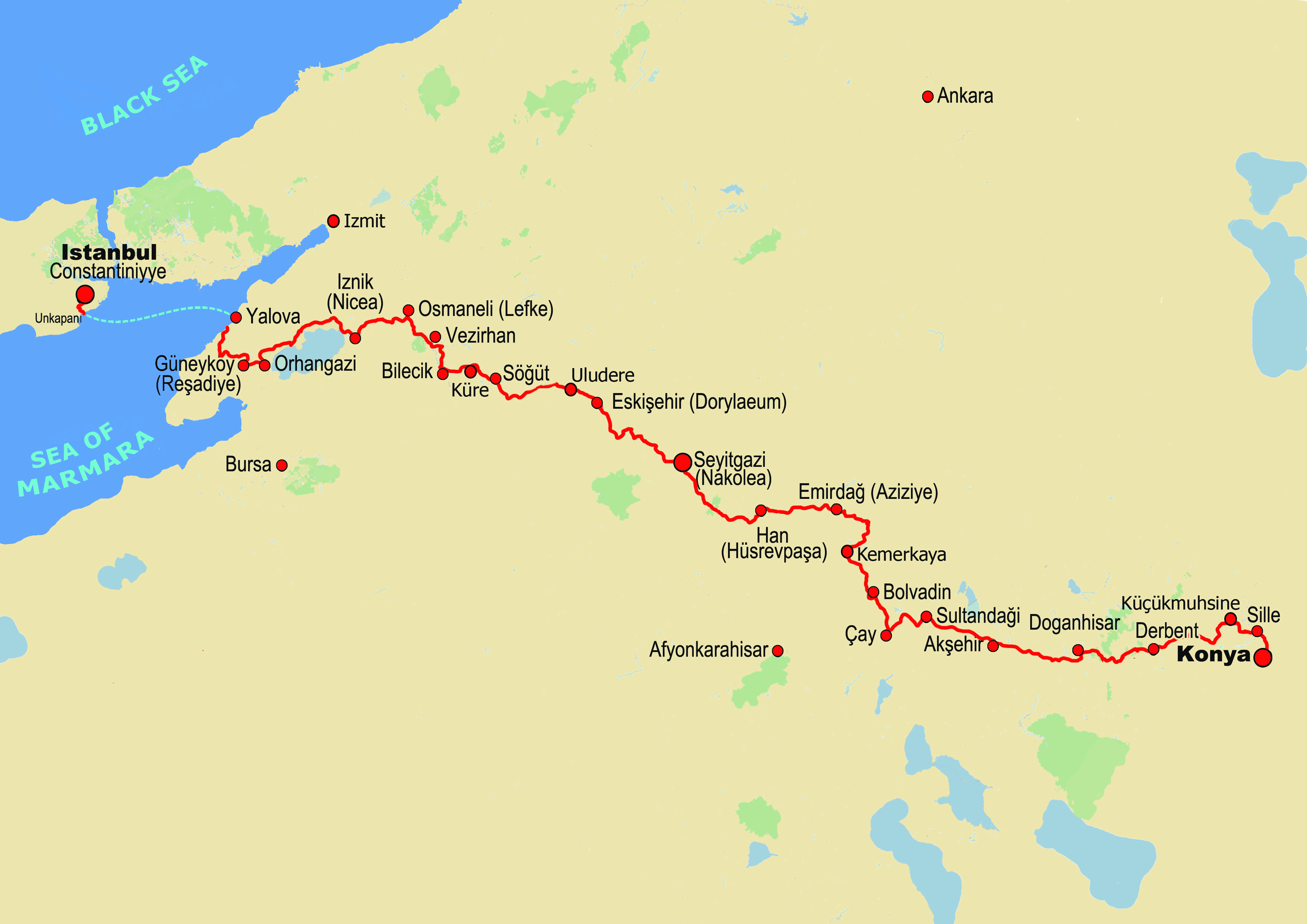
Route of the Sufi Trail

== Route ==
The description in this article is given from west to east. This is the recommended direction since it puts the heaviest climbs at the end of the route.

The trail begins in Istanbul's Eyüp neighbourhood. The route passes through Istanbul and then crosses the Sea of Marmara by ferry to Yalova. From there it crosses the provinces of Yalova, Bursa, Bilecik, Eskişehir, Ayonkarahisar and Konya to reach the mausoleum of Jalal ad-Din Muhammad Rumi in Mevlana Museum on Mevlava Square in Konya.

== Places of interest ==
Istanbul and Konya, the starting point and end point of the trail, are both ancient cities full of historic places of interest.

Besides these, the trail passes

- The Khanqah of Arslanköy
- The hamams in Termal
- The historic town of İznik
- The türbe of Sheikh Edebali and Orhan Gazi Mosque in Bilecik
- The old city of Eskişehir
- The Seyyid Battal Gazi Complex
- The Gerdekkaya rock cut tomb monument and other Phrygian period sites near Çukurca
- The Midas Monument at Yazılıkaya
- The underground city of Han
- The Kirkgöz bridge
- The old silk road town of Sultandağı
- The religious complex of Taşmedrese
- The former Greek village of Sille

== Additional sources ==
- Bezuijen, Iris; Çakir, Sedat (April 2018). Sufi Trail Part 1: 40 Days to Dervishhood. ISBN 978-94-92953-01-8.
- Bezuijen, Iris; Çakir, Sedat (April 2018). Sufi Trail Part 2: 40 Days to Dervishhood. ISBN 978-94-92953-02-5.
- Çakir, Sedat (January 2019). Sufi Yolu. ISBN 978-60-58138-57-5.
