= Fıstıklı, Armutlu =

Fıstıklı
- Village
- Location within Turkey Location within Marmara
- Coordinates: 40°29′35″N 28°53′42″E
- Country: Turkey
- Province: Yalova
- District: Armutlu
- Elevation: 11 m (36 ft)
- Population (2022): 1,312
- Time zone: UTC+3 (TRT)
- Postal code: 77500
- Area code: 0226

Fıstıklı is a village in the Armutlu District of the Yalova Province in Turkey. Its population is 1,312 (2022).

Fıstıklı is a coastal village located alongside the Armutlu–Gemlik highway. It is 8 kilometers from central Armutlu and 63 kilometers from the capital of the Yalova Province. The main sources of income for the village, which lies on the coast of the Sea of Marmara, are olive tree cultivation and fishing. Located in Fıstıklı are a village health clinic and an elementary school.
