= Kadıköy, Yalova =

Kadıköy
- Municipality
- Location in Turkey Kadıköy (Marmara)
- Coordinates: 40°37′N 29°14′E
- Country: Turkey
- Province: Yalova
- District: Yalova
- Elevation: 5 m (16 ft)
- Population (2022): 9,543
- Time zone: UTC+3 (TRT)
- Postal code: 77210
- Area code: 0226

Kadıköy is a town (belde) in the Yalova District, Yalova Province, Turkey. Its population is 9,543 (2022). It is 7 kilometres (4.3 mi) south west of Yalova and at the midpoint of Armutlu Peninsula. The settlement was founded by an Ottoman kadı ("judge") . Hence it was named Kadıköy ("Judge's village"). During Ottoman Empire most of the population was composed of Greeks. But according to the Population exchange between Greece and Turkey agreement the Greek population was replaced by the Turkish population from Greece. Refugees from Caucasus after the Russo-Turkish War (1877-1878) were also settled in the village. The village was declared a seat of township in 1991. Intensive farming such as green house farming and floriculture is the main economic activity of the town.
