= Yalova Earthquake Monument =

- Yalova Deprem Anıtı
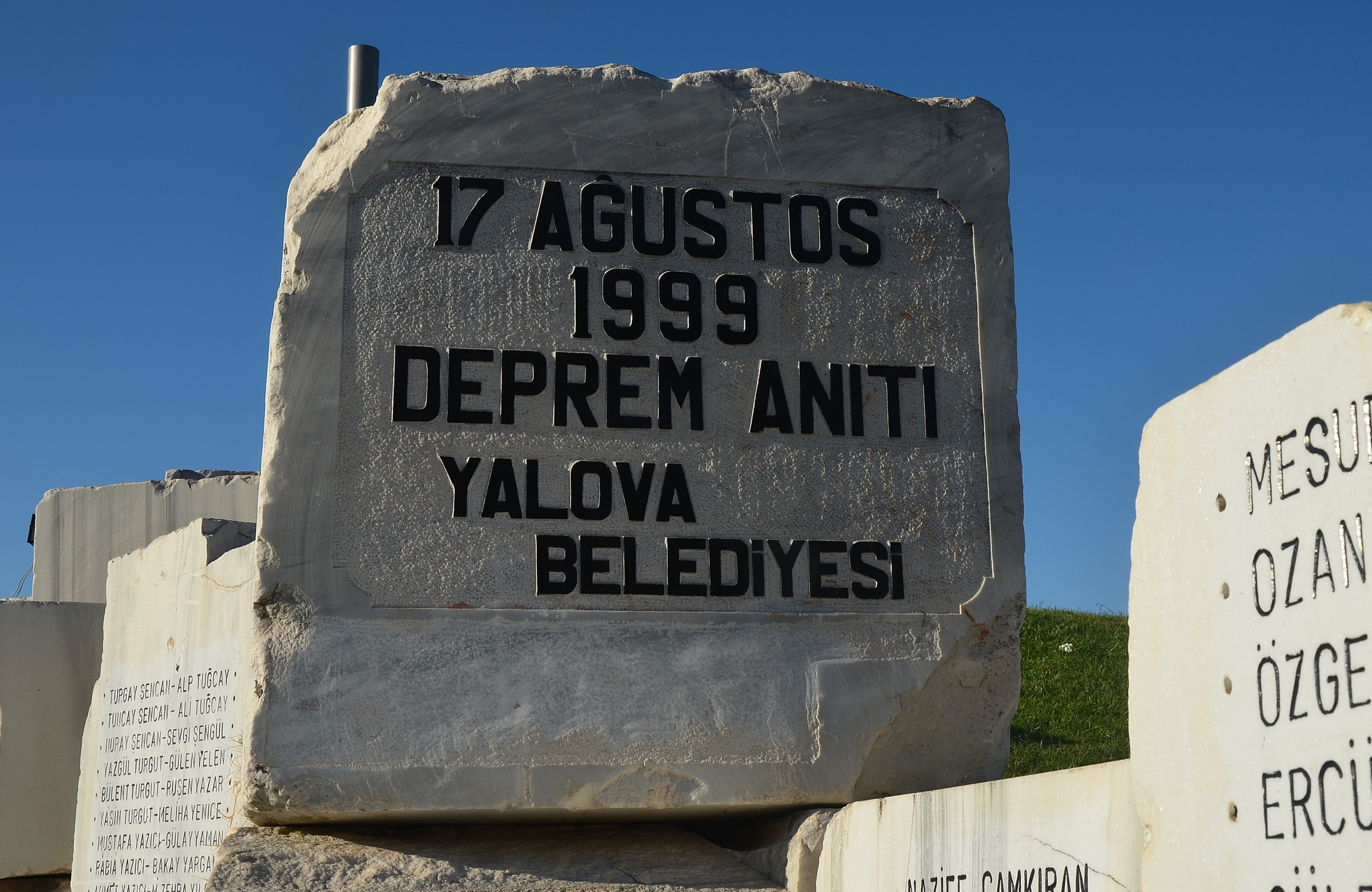
- Yalova Earthquake Monument
- Interactive map of Yalova Earthquake Monument
- Location: 17 August Park, Yalova, Turkey
- Coordinates: 40°39′28″N 29°15′12″E
- Designer: Ümit Öztürk
- Material: Marble
- Beginning date: June 5, 2000
- Opening date: August 17, 2000; 25 years ago
- Dedicated to: the victims of the 1999 İzmit earthquake in Yalova Turkey

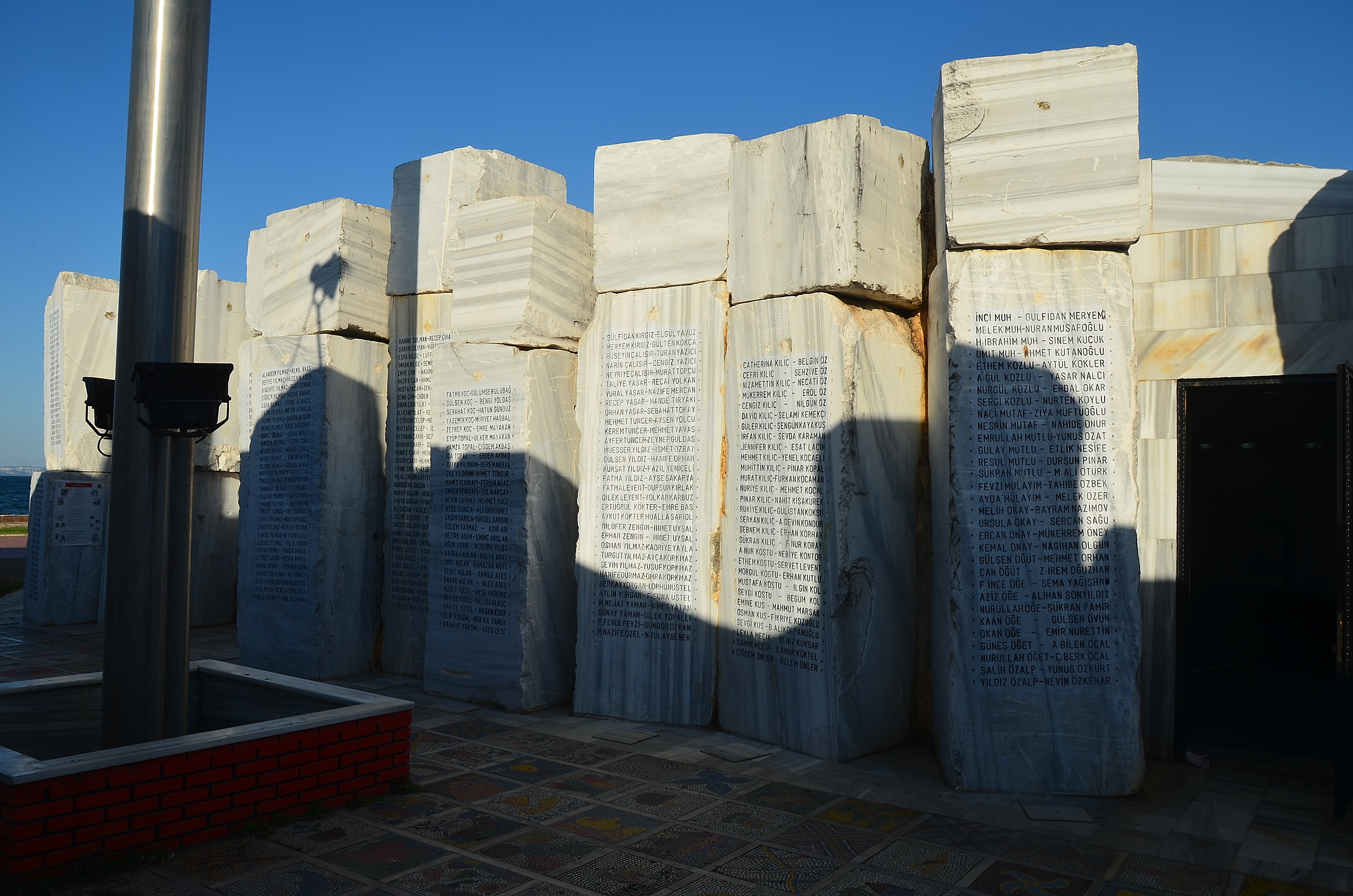
Marble blocks bearing the names of the victims.

The Yalova Earthquake Monument (Turkish: Yalova Deprem Anıtı), a.k.a. 17 August 1999 Earthquake Monument (Turkish: 17 Ağustos 1999 Deprem Anıtı), is a monument to commemorate the victims of the 1999 İzmit earthquake in Yalova, Turkey. Situated in the 17 August Memorial Park in Yalova, it was opened at the first anniversary of the earthquake on August 17, 2000.

== Background ==
In the early hours of August 17, 1999, a powerful earthquake of moment magnitude 7.4 hit the provinces Yalova, Kocaeli and Istanbul in northwestern Turkey, causing the death of around 18,000 people. The extent of the earthquake's damage in Yalova is given officially by 2,508 people dead, and 13,939 heavily damaged homes, which had to be demolished. According to unofficial estimates, the death toll is more. 15,237 buildings were damaged moderate and further 12, 878 in lesser degree.

== Monument ==
Right after the earthquake, cleaning and rebuilding work began in Yalova, and the rubble of the collapsed buildings were dumped in the Sea of Marmara directly at its coast. With the completion of the cleanup efforts, the land reclaimed from the sea reached an area covering 65,000 m^{2} (700,000 sq ft).

On June 5, 2000, a groundbreaking ceremony was held for the building of a monument to commemorate the earthquake victims in Yalova. The monument was designed by the sculptor Ümit Öztürk. Situated in the newly established public park on the reclaimed land, the monument's opening took place in the presence of Deputy Prime Minister Mesut Yılmaz and Minister of Labour and Social Security, Deputy of Yalova Yaşar Okuyan on August 17, 2000, the first anniversary of the disaster. The park, initially named "Yaşar Okuyan Park" by the city council of Yalova on June 1, 2000, was renamed to "17 August Park" upon the minister's personal request.

The monument, which is in the middle of a small artificial hill, consists of piled marble blocks flanking a hallway and containing the names of around 3,000 earthquake victims. Next to each name, there is a tiny hole to hold a flower. The monument's hallway is paved with colorful mosaic figures, of which small stone pieces were made by the children in Yalova. There are also two halls on both sides of the monument's hallway exhibiting photographs taken after the earthquake.

== Gallery ==
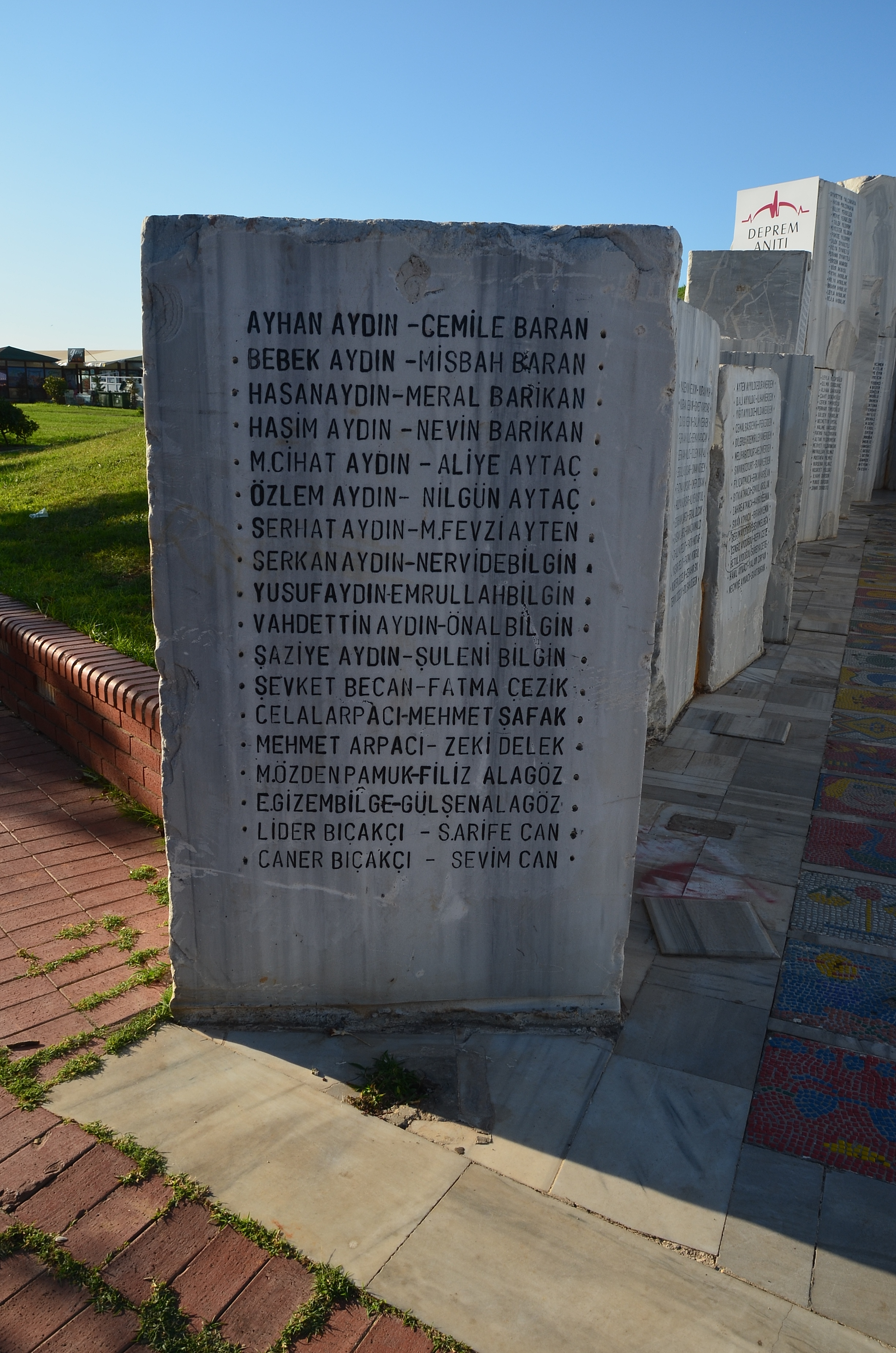
Marble block bearing the names of the victims and tiny holes next to each name to hold a flower

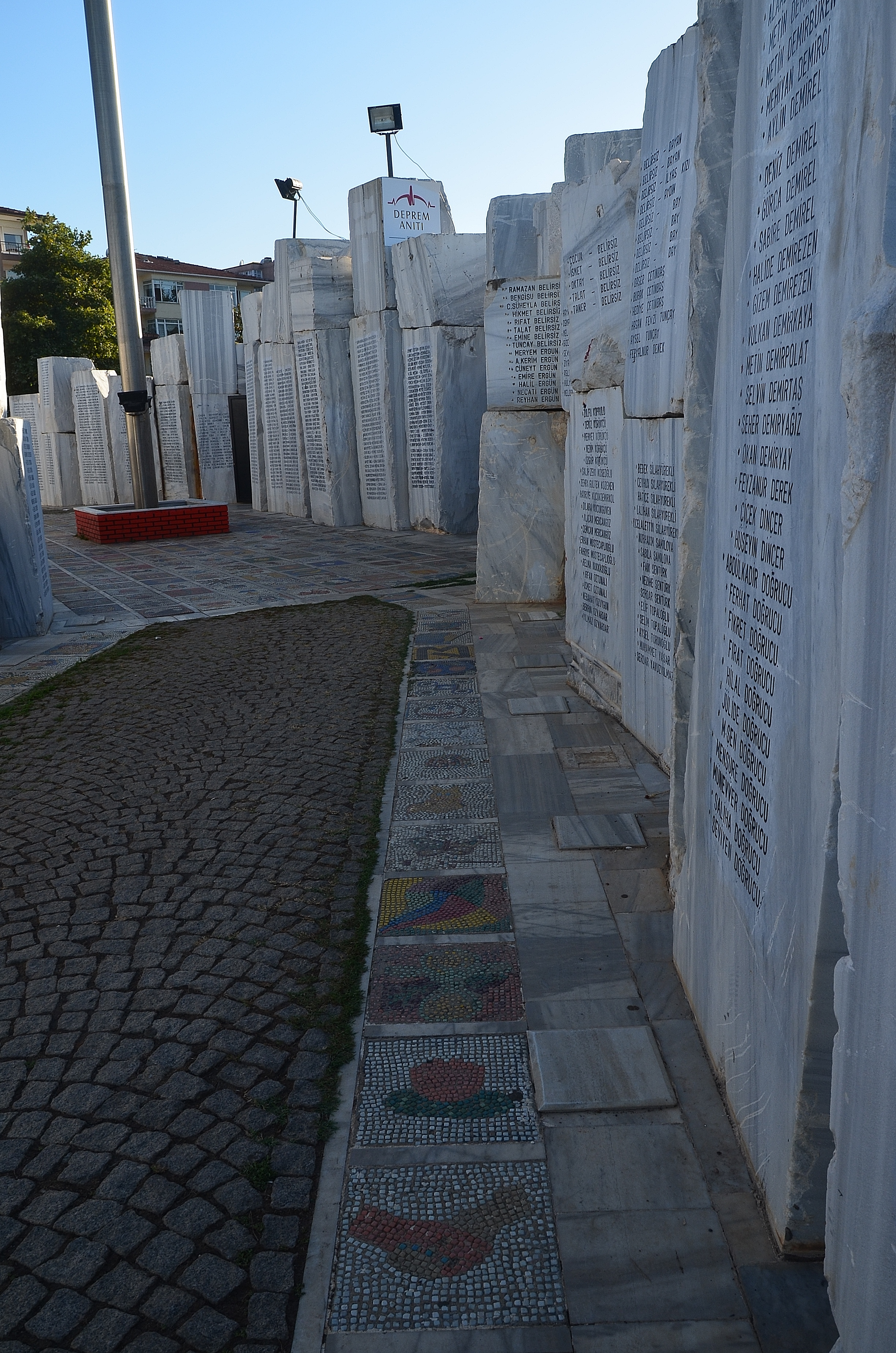
Monument hallway

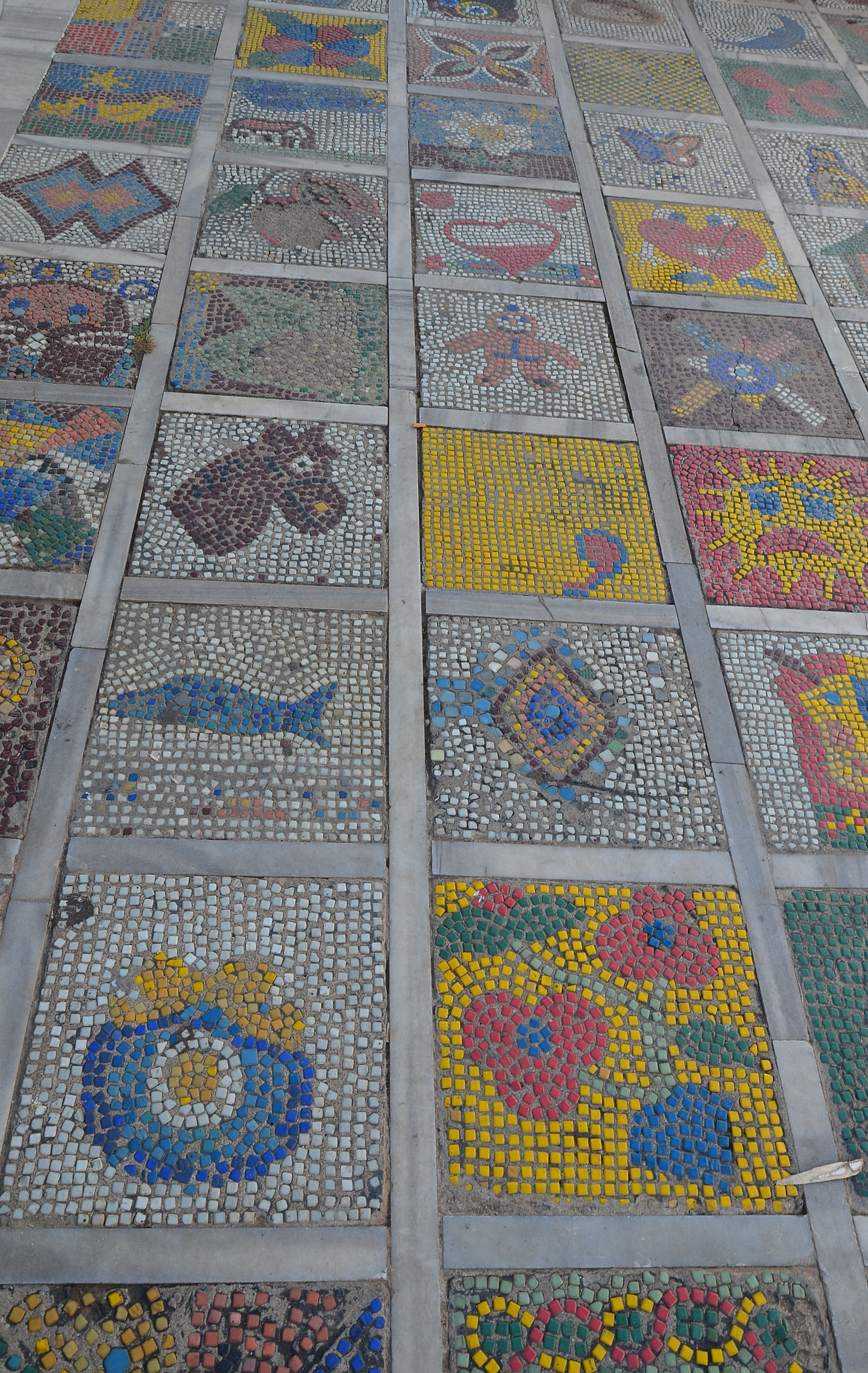
Mosaics on the monument hallway

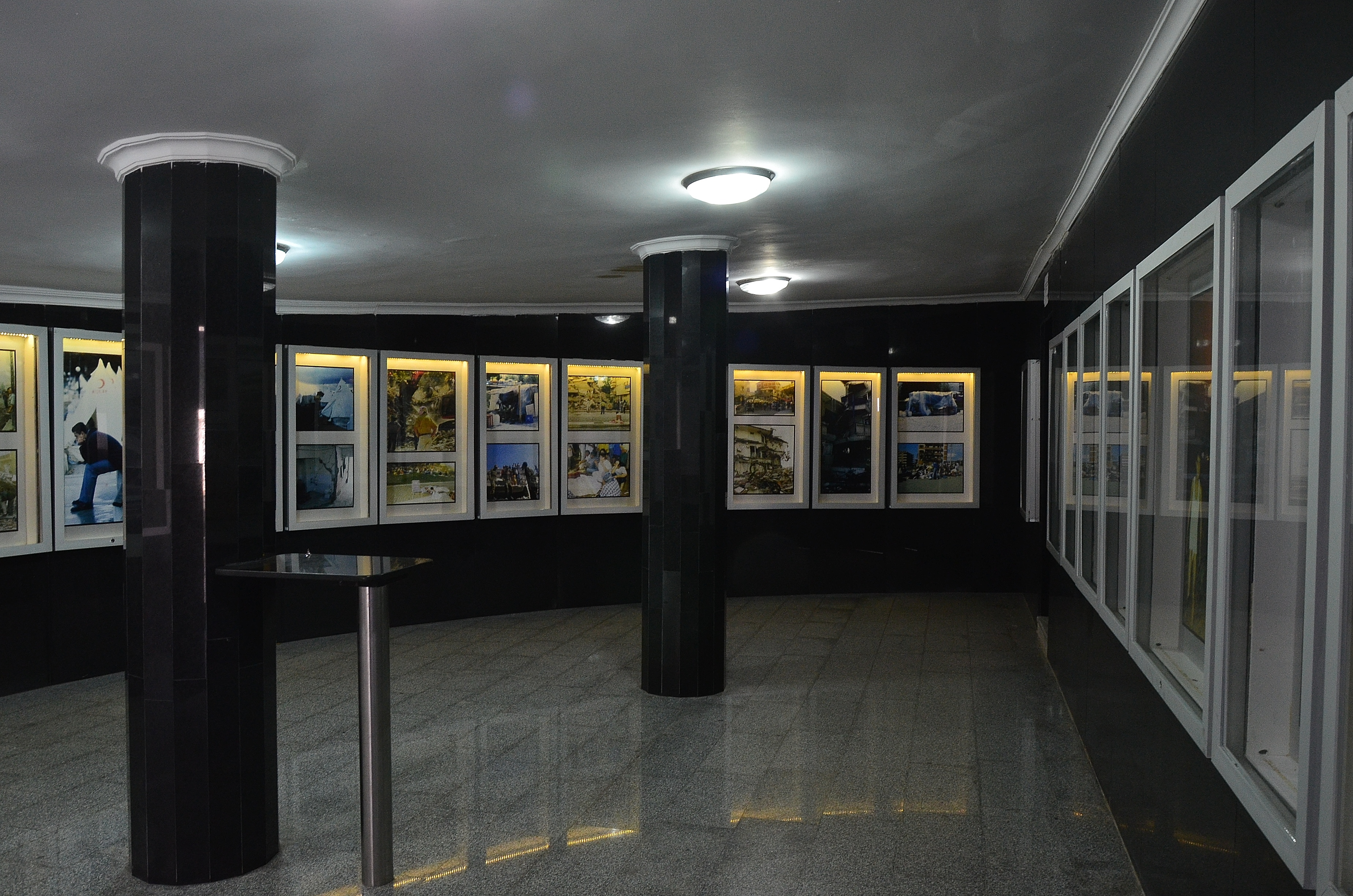
Photograph exhibition at the monument
