= Güneyköy, Yalova =

Güneyköy
- Village
- Location within Turkey Location within Marmara
- Coordinates: 40°33′14″N 29°16′41″E
- Country: Turkey
- Province: Yalova
- District: Yalova
- Population (2022): 505
- Time zone: UTC+3 (TRT)

Güneyköy is a village in the Yalova District of the Yalova Province in Turkey. Its population is 505 (2022).

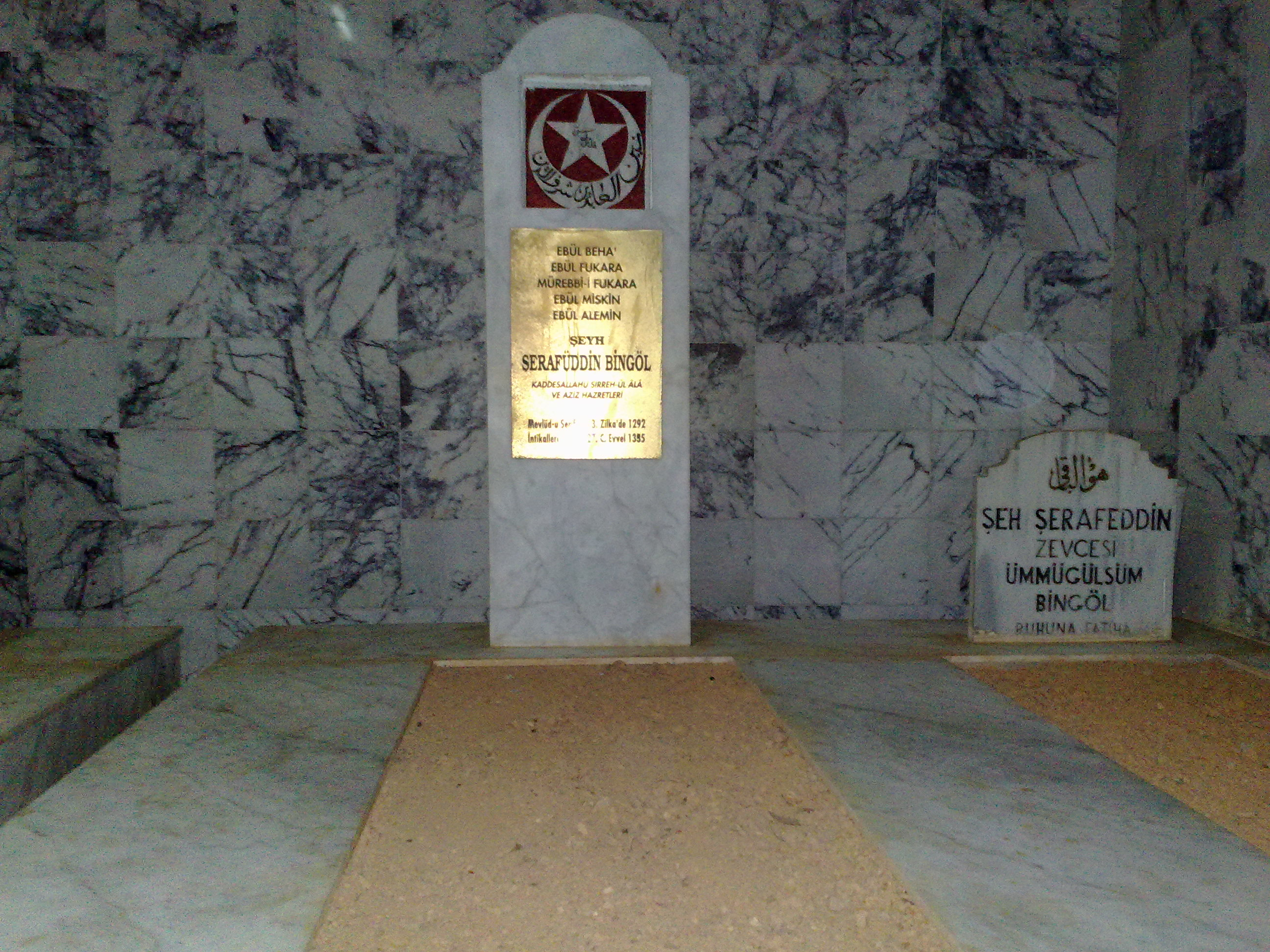
Tomb of Sheikh Şerafeddin Dağıstanî

The village was founded in 1896 by immigrants from Dagestan. The first official name of the village was given as Almali or Elmaalani in 1899, as mentioned in the archives of the prime minister. While the name Almali was used, the name was changed to Reşadiye in 1910 after Sultan Mehmed V Reshad visited the village, was pleased by it, and had a memorial fountain built there. In 1934, it was named Güneyköy because of its location on the southernmost shore of Istanbul's borders. The village has three mosques, two official schools and a medrese. In 1919, it was invaded by the Greek Army during the Turkish War of Independence, and its inhabitants migrated to the Geyve and Adapazarı regions for three years. Only a portion of this population was able to return after the war.

Sheikh Şerafeddin Dağıstanî and Abu Muhammad al-Madani of the Naqshbandi-Haqqani Golden Chain are buried up in the cemetery of the village.
