= Termal District =

District of Yalova Province, Turkey

- District
- Map showing Termal District in Yalova Province

- Location in Turkey Termal District (Marmara)
- Coordinates: 40°36′N 29°10′E
- Country: Turkey
- Province: Yalova
- Seat: Termal

Government
  - Kaymakam: Faruk Doğru
- Area: 67 km^{2} (26 sq mi)
- Population (2022): 6,977
  - Density: 100/km^{2} (270/sq mi)
- Time zone: UTC+3 (TRT)
- Website: www.termal.gov.tr

Termal District is a district of the Yalova Province of Turkey. Its seat is the town of Termal. Its area is 67 km^{2}, and its population is 6,977 (2022).

== Composition ==
There is one municipality in Termal District:

- Termal

There are two villages in Termal District:

- Akköy
- Yenimahalle
