= Armutlu District =

District of Yalova Province, Turkey

- District
- Map showing Armutlu District in Yalova Province

- Location in Turkey Armutlu District (Marmara)
- Coordinates: 40°31′N 28°50′E
- Country: Turkey
- Province: Yalova
- Seat: Armutlu

Government
  - Kaymakam: Yusuf Melikşah Aydın
- Area: 166 km^{2} (64 sq mi)
- Population (2022): 10,843
  - Density: 65/km^{2} (170/sq mi)
- Time zone: UTC+3 (TRT)
- Website: www.armutlu.gov.tr

The Map of Armutlu

Armutlu District is a district of the Yalova Province of Turkey. Its seat is the town of Armutlu. Its area is 166 km^{2}, and its population is 10,843 (2022).

== Composition ==
There is one municipality in Armutlu District:

- Armutlu

There are three neighbourhoods and five villages in Armutlu District:

- 50. Yıl Neighbourhood
- Bayır Neighbourhood
- Karşıyaka Neighbourhood
- Fıstıklı
- Hayriye
- Kapaklı
- Mecidiye
- Selimiye
