= Yaşar Okuyan =

Turkish politician (1950–2023)

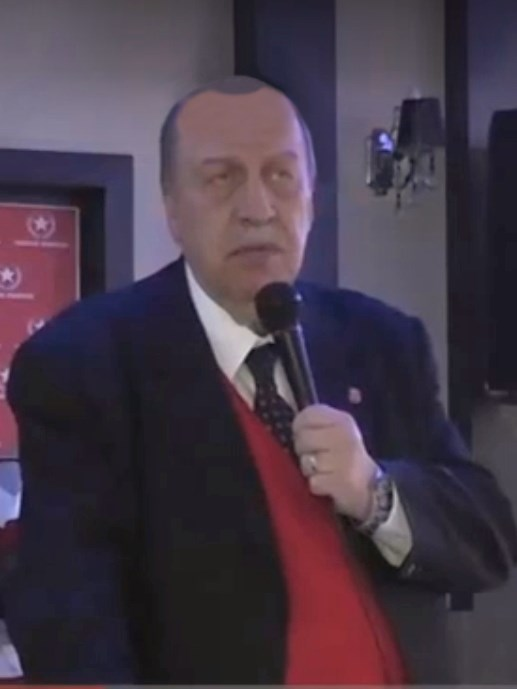

Yaşar Okuyan (28 August 1950, Yalova – 26 December 2023, Ankara) was a Turkish politician who served as an MP. Okuyan was born on 28 August 1950 and died of a lung disease on 26 December 2023 at the age of 73.
