= Termal =

- Municipality
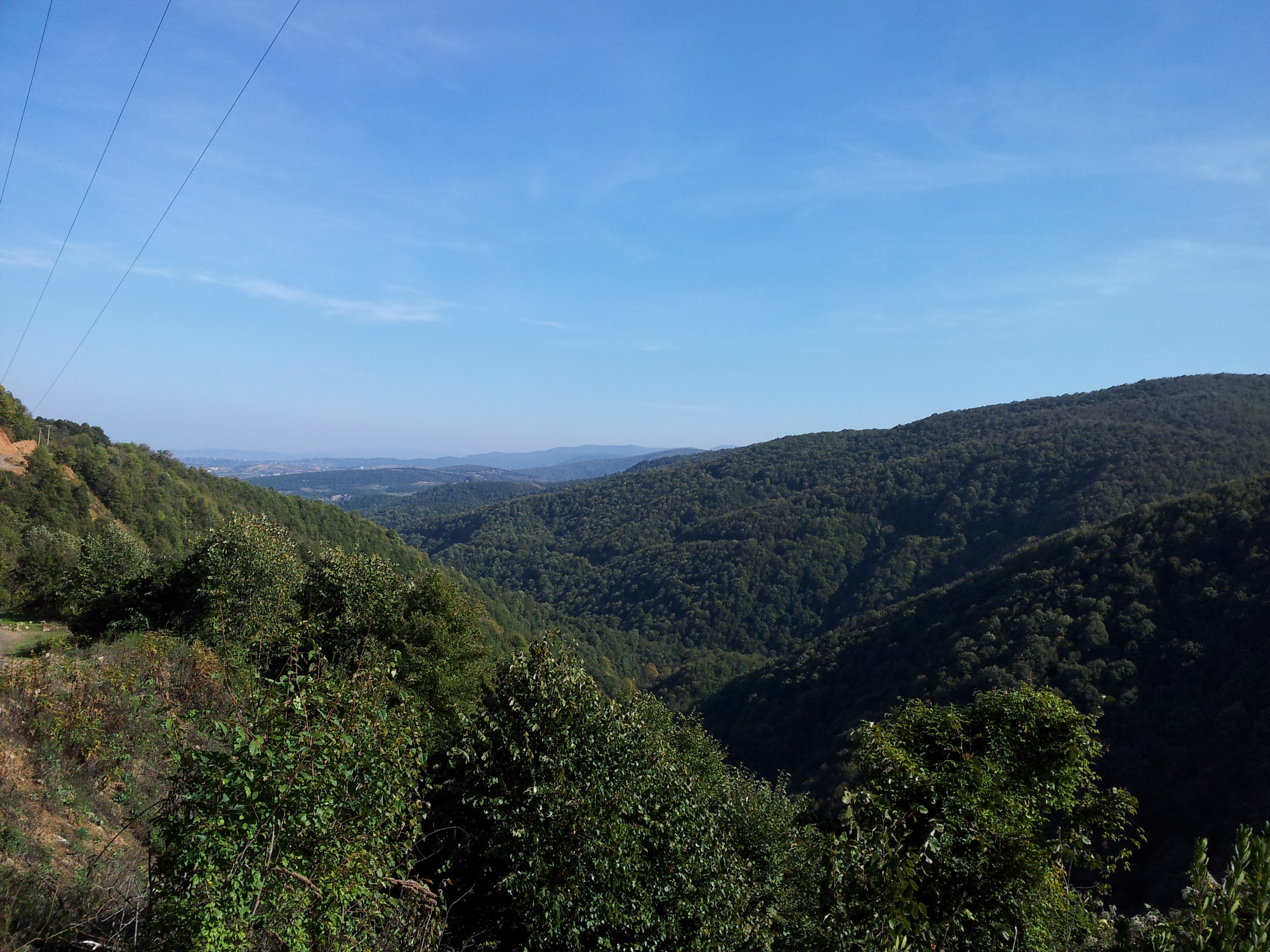
- A view of the mountainside of Termal

- Location within Turkey Location within Marmara
- Coordinates: 40°36′19″N 29°10′28″E
- Country: Turkey
- Province: Yalova
- District: Termal

Government
  - Mayor: Hüseyin Sinan Acar (AKP)
- Population (2022): 3,409
- Time zone: UTC+3 (TRT)
- Area code: 0226
- Website: www.termal.bel.tr

Termal is a town in Yalova Province in the Marmara region of Turkey. It is the seat of Termal District. Its population is 3,409 (2022). It is renowned for its hot springs, Yalova Thermal Baths (Turkish: Termal). It is about 80 km away from Istanbul. The huge hot springs complex, lying on a land of about 1.6 square kilometres, is located 12 km away from Yalova. There are four hotels in the complex, one of which is an aparthotel. There are also five baths which possess historical value. The mayor is Hüseyin Sinan Acar (AK Party).

== Festivals ==
A periodic Sufi festival is held at the Rasim Mutlu Kültür Merkezi, founded by Rahmi Oruç Güvenç (a.k.a. Oruch Baba), which attracts visitors from all over the world. Participants perform the sema continuously for days in a row.

== Gallery ==
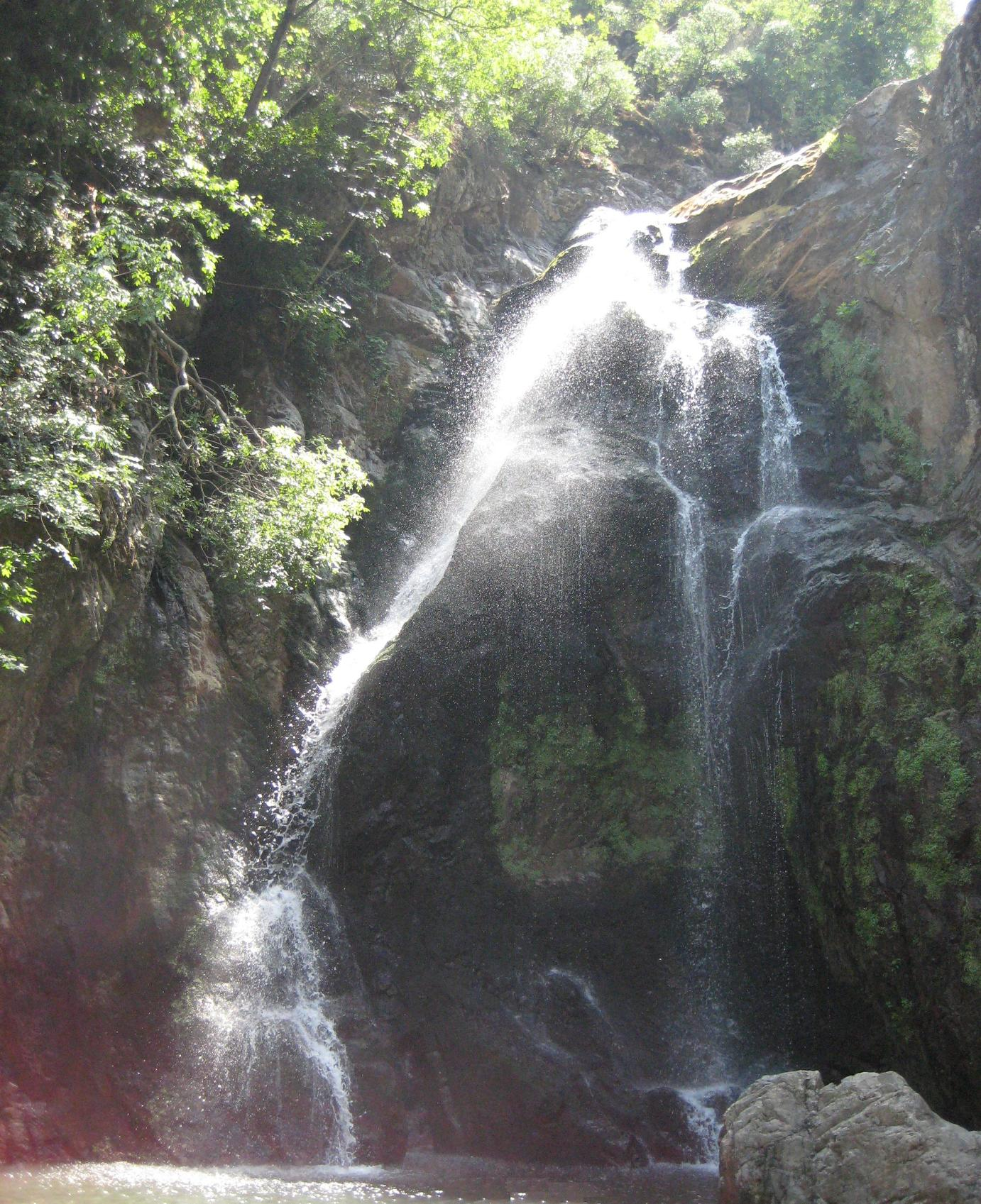
Su Düşen (Çifte Şelale) Waterfall, near Termal, Yalova

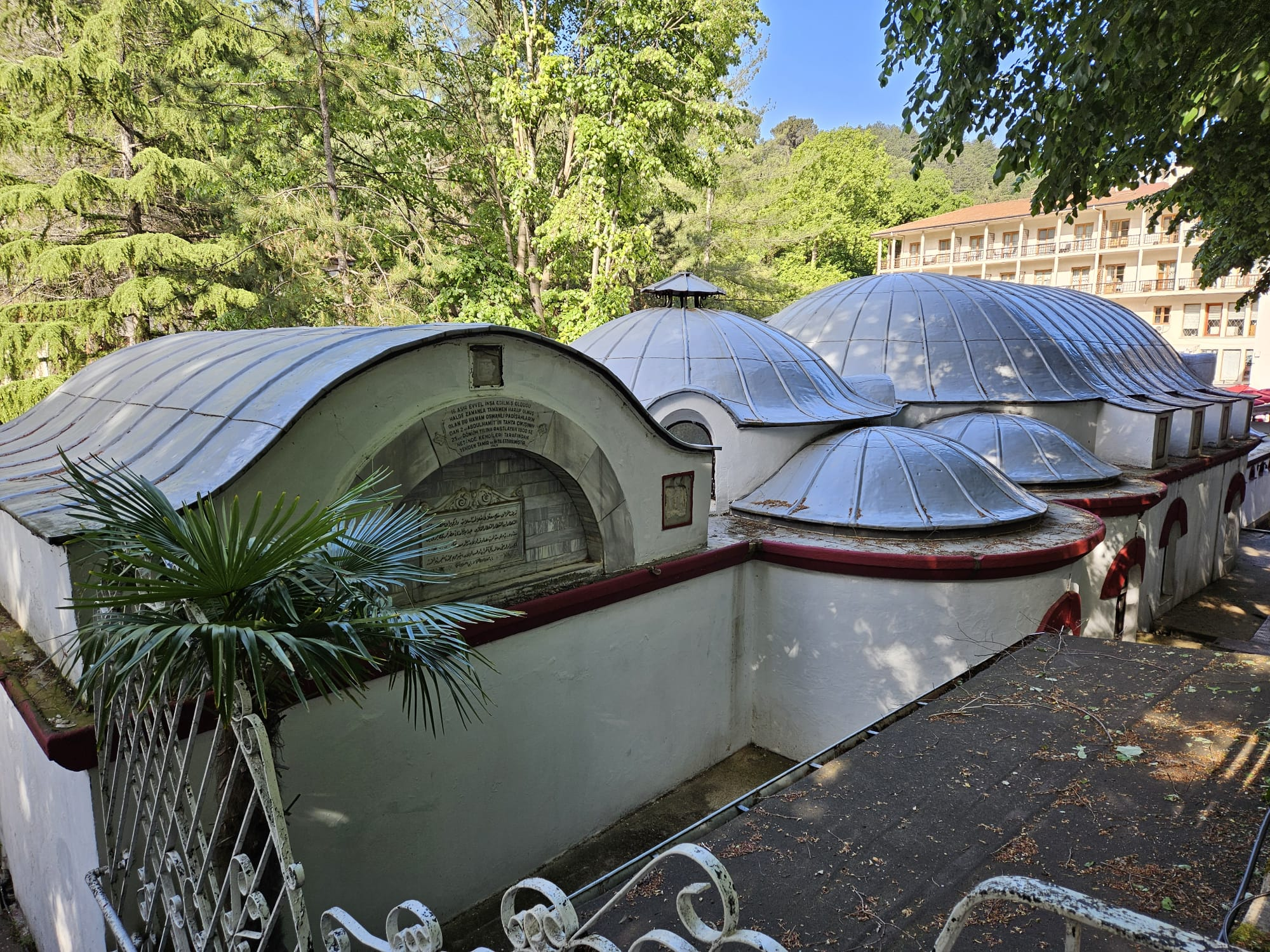
Circa 1,600-year-old historic thermal baths located in Termal

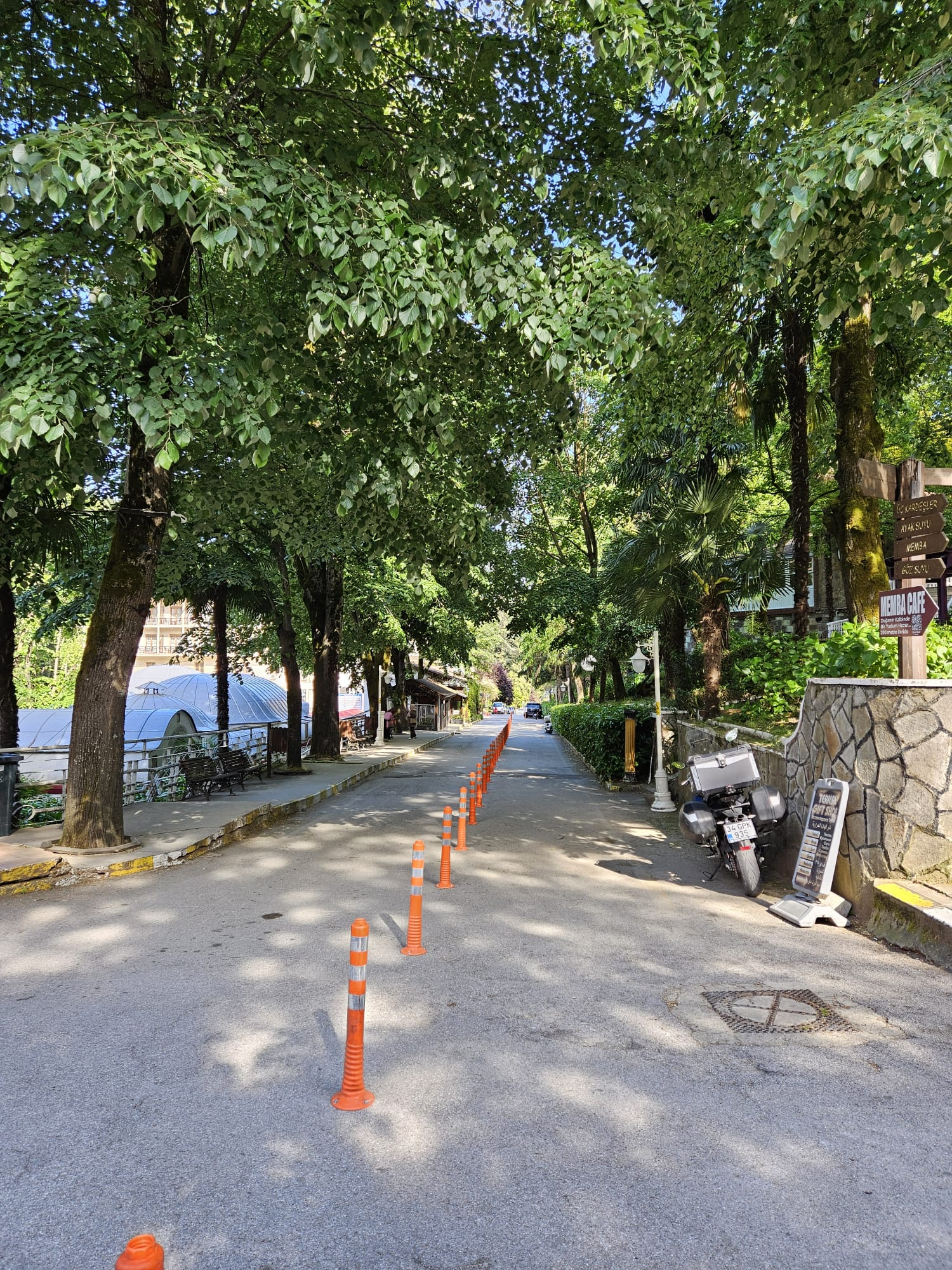
Main street of the thermal baths in Termal

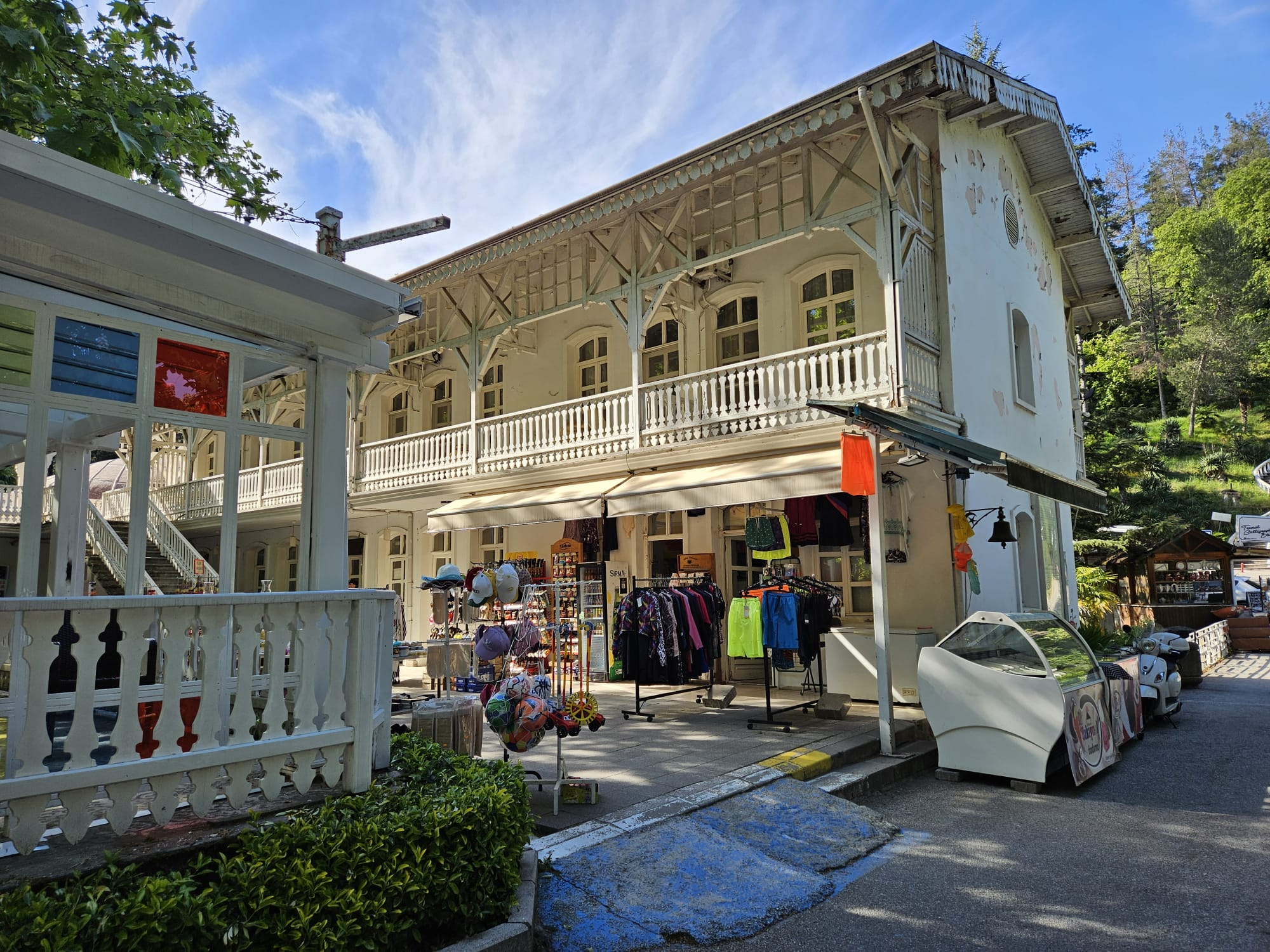
Historic Çınar Hotel near the thermal baths in Termal
