= Armutlu, Yalova =

Armutlu
- Municipality
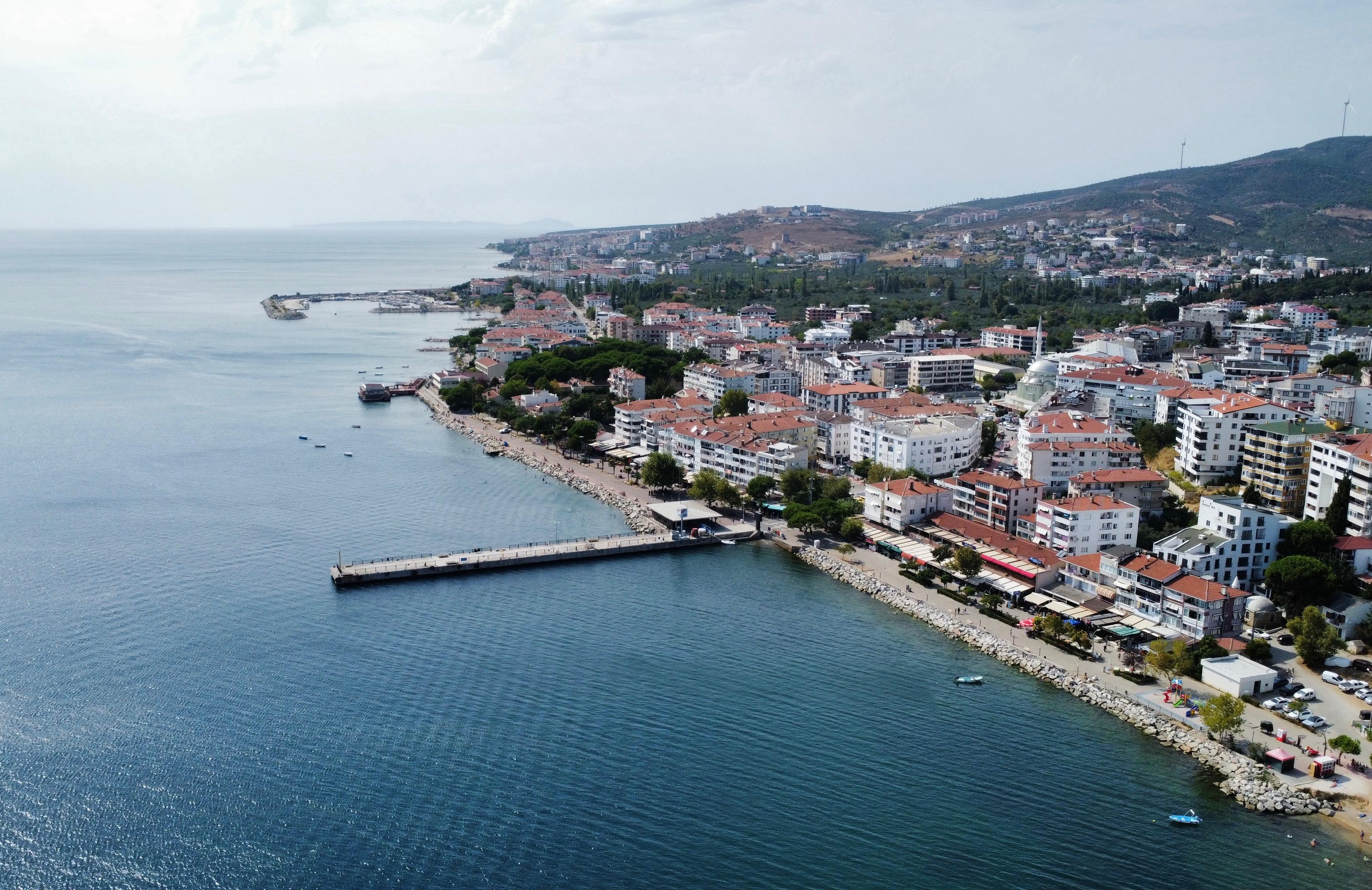
- Armutlu Pier

- Location within Turkey Location within Marmara
- Coordinates: 40°31′10″N 28°49′41″E
- Country: Turkey
- Province: Yalova
- District: Armutlu

Government
  - Mayor: Cengiz Arslan (AK Party)
- Elevation: 14 m (46 ft)
- Population (2022): 8,227
- Time zone: UTC+3 (TRT)
- Postal code: 77500
- Area code: 0226
- Website: www.armutlu.bel.tr

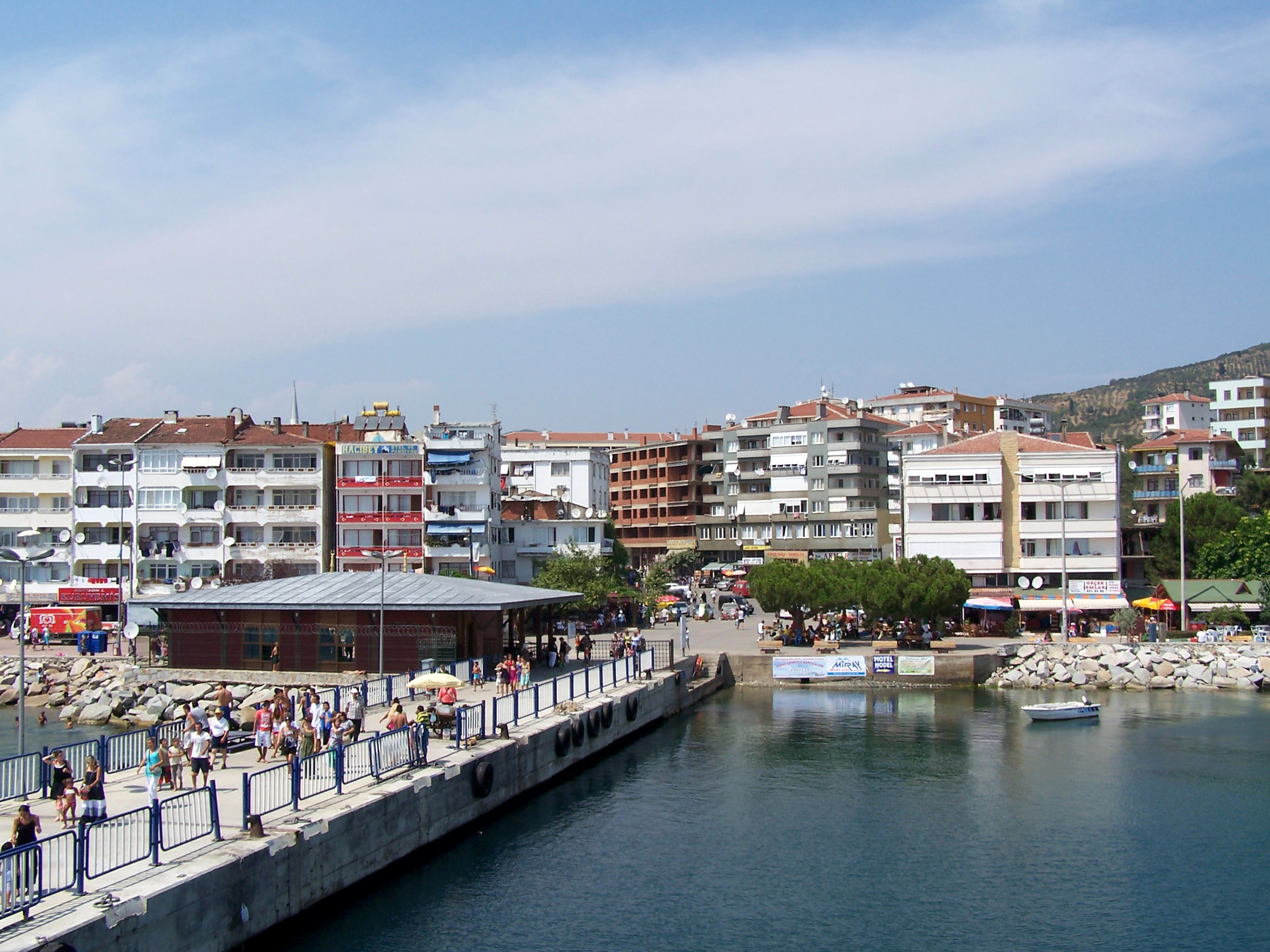
Ferry port of Armutlu

Armutlu is a town in Yalova Province in the Marmara region of Turkey. It is the seat of Armutlu District. Its population is 8,227 (2022). The mayor is Cengiz Arslan (AK Party).

== See also ==
- Armutlu Peninsula
