= Taşmedrese =

Religious complex in Akşehir, Turkey

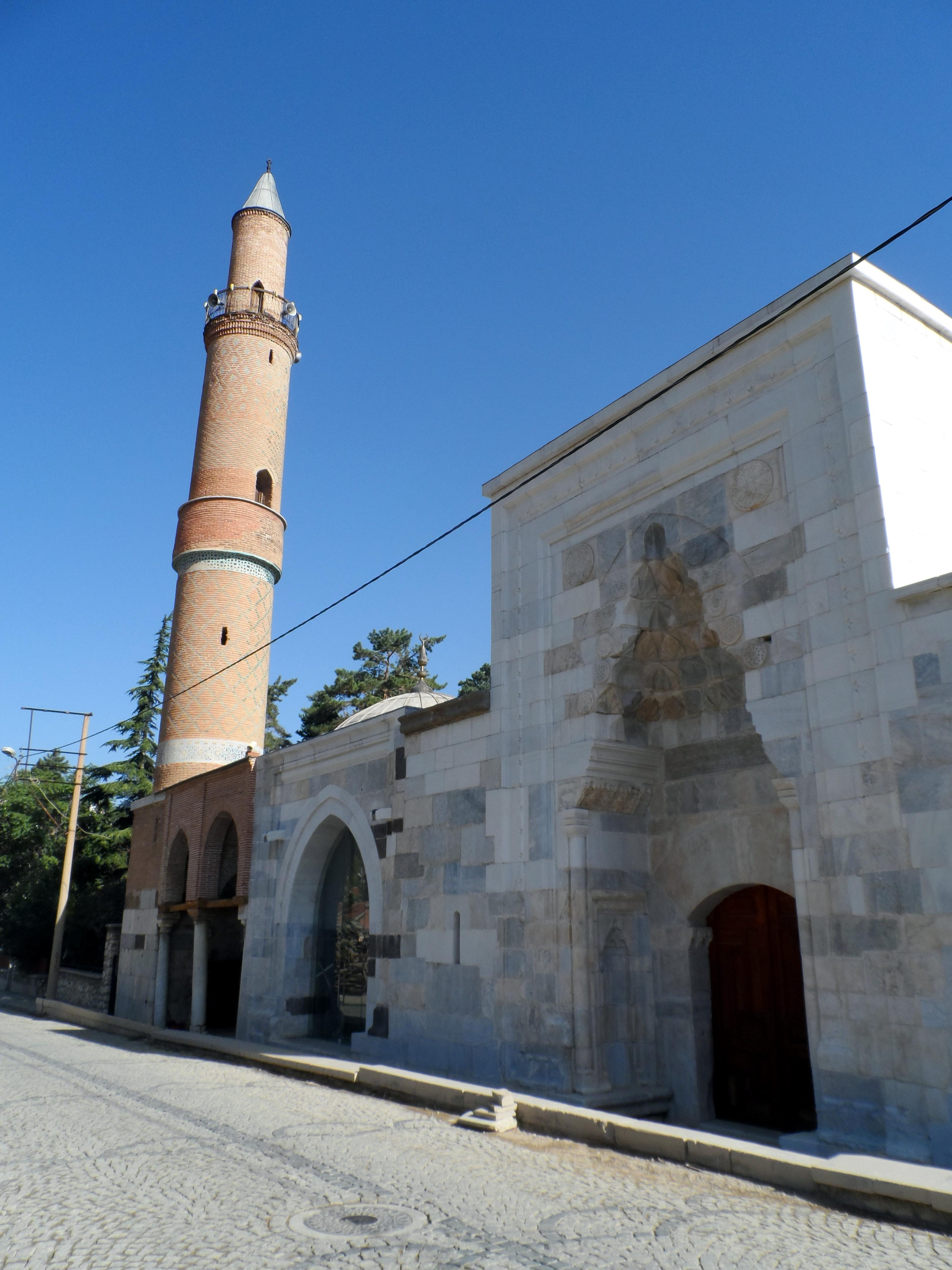
- Taşmedrese portal

- Location within Turkey

Religion
- District: Akşehir
- Province: Konya Province
- Region: Central Anatolia
- Rite: Sunni Islam
- Status: Active

Location
- Location: 24 Ağustos bu., 73, Akşehir
- State: Turkey
- Coordinates: 38°21′36″N 31°24′34″E

Architecture
- Type: Mosque
- Groundbreaking: 1250
- Minaret: 1

Taşmedrese (literally "stone Madrasa", also called Halkalı Medrese) is a 13th-century religious complex in Akşehir, Turkey.

It is at 38°21′36″N 31°24′34″E in Akşehir ilçe (district) of Konya Province.

The complex was commissioned by Sahip Ata, the vizier (equivalent of modern prime minister) of Sultanate of Rum. As the name implies, it was originally a madrasa (religious school) which was built in 1250. With later additions it became a religious complex with a mosque, imaret (soup kitchen), hankah (a kind of reclusion room), a fountain etc. But now only the madrasa, the mosque which was built in 1261 and a tomb are standing. In 1965 it was opened as a museum. In 1986 it was put under restoration.

The building has an open yard with four iwans. The students' rooms and the classrooms are around the yard. The marble columns supporting the porticos around the yard are collect material from a former Byzantine building. The marble entrance is a modern reconstruction. One of the most interesting features of the building is a double şerefe ("balcony") minaret which was uncommon during the Seljukid age.
