= Yalova (surname) =

Yalova (Cyrillic: Ялова) is a surname of the following notable people:

- Mariya Yalova (born 1981), Kazakhstani women's football forward
- Melike İpek Yalova (born 1984), Turkish actress
