= Yalova District =

District of Yalova Province, Turkey

- District
- Map showing Yalova District in Yalova Province

- Location in Turkey Yalova District (Marmara)
- Coordinates: 40°39′N 29°16′E
- Country: Turkey
- Province: Yalova
- Seat: Yalova
- Area: 139 km^{2} (54 sq mi)
- Population (2022): 156,732
  - Density: 1,100/km^{2} (2,900/sq mi)
- Time zone: UTC+3 (TRT)

Yalova District (also: Merkez, meaning "central" in Turkish) is a district of the Yalova Province of Turkey. Its seat is the city of Yalova. Its area is 139 km^{2}, and its population is 156,732 (2022).

== Composition ==
There are two municipalities in Yalova District:

- Kadıköy
- Yalova

There are 11 villages in Yalova District:

- Elmalık
- Esadiye
- Güneyköy
- Hacımehmet
- Kazımiye
- Kirazlı
- Kurtköy
- Safran
- Samanlı
- Soğucak
- Sugören
