= Yalova =

Town in Turkey

- Municipality
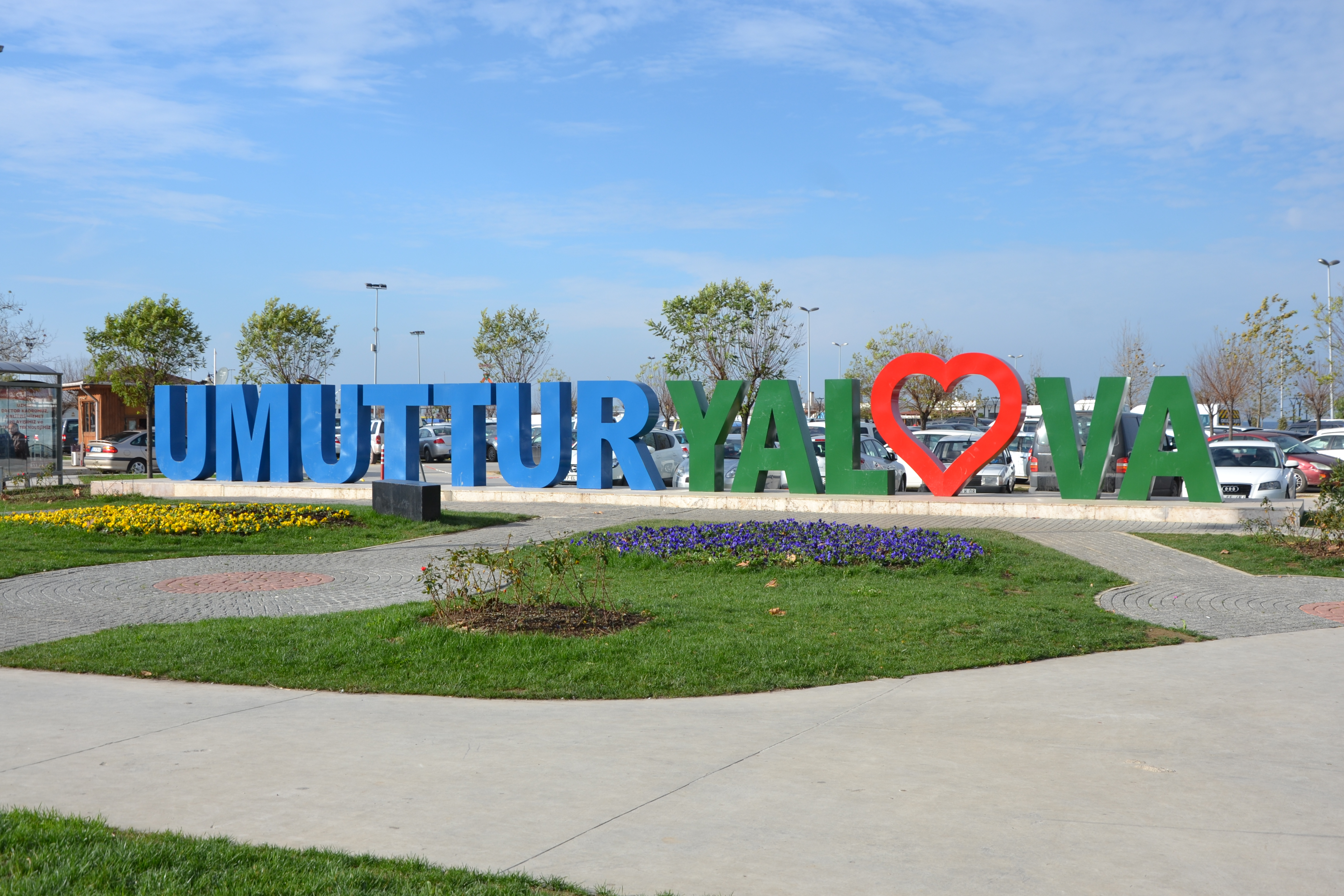
- "Yalova is the hope" municipality sign

- Logo

- Location within Turkey Location within Marmara
- Coordinates: 40°39′30″N 29°16′12″E
- Country: Turkey
- Province: Yalova
- District: Yalova

Government
  - Mayor: Mehmet Gürel (New Party)
- Elevation: 30 m (98 ft)
- Population (2024): 157,499
- Time zone: UTC+3 (TRT)
- Postal code: 77000
- Area code: 0226
- Website: www.yalova.bel.tr

Yalova is a city located in northwestern Turkey on the eastern coast of the Sea of Marmara. It is the seat of Yalova Province and Yalova District. The city has a population of over 250,000 with adjacent conurbation districts (Note: Çiftlikköy and Çınarcık districts). A largely modern city, it is best known for the spa resort at nearby Termal, a popular summer retreat for residents of Istanbul.

Regular ferries connect Yalova with Istanbul via the Sea of Marmara. They are operated by İDO.

== Name ==
The name Yalova is assumed to be a contraction of Yalıova. Yalı means 'house at the coast' and ova means 'plain' in Turkish.

== History ==
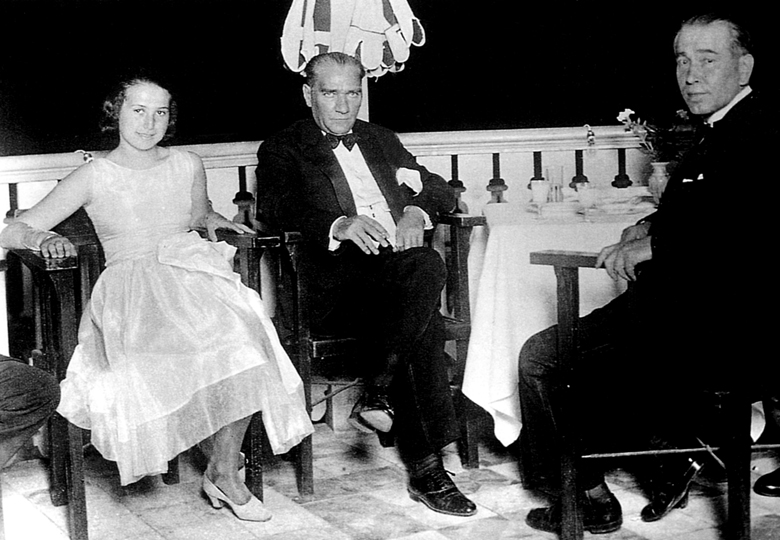
Mustafa Kemal Atatürk with Ali Fethi Okyar and Okyar's daughter in Yalova, on August 13, 1930

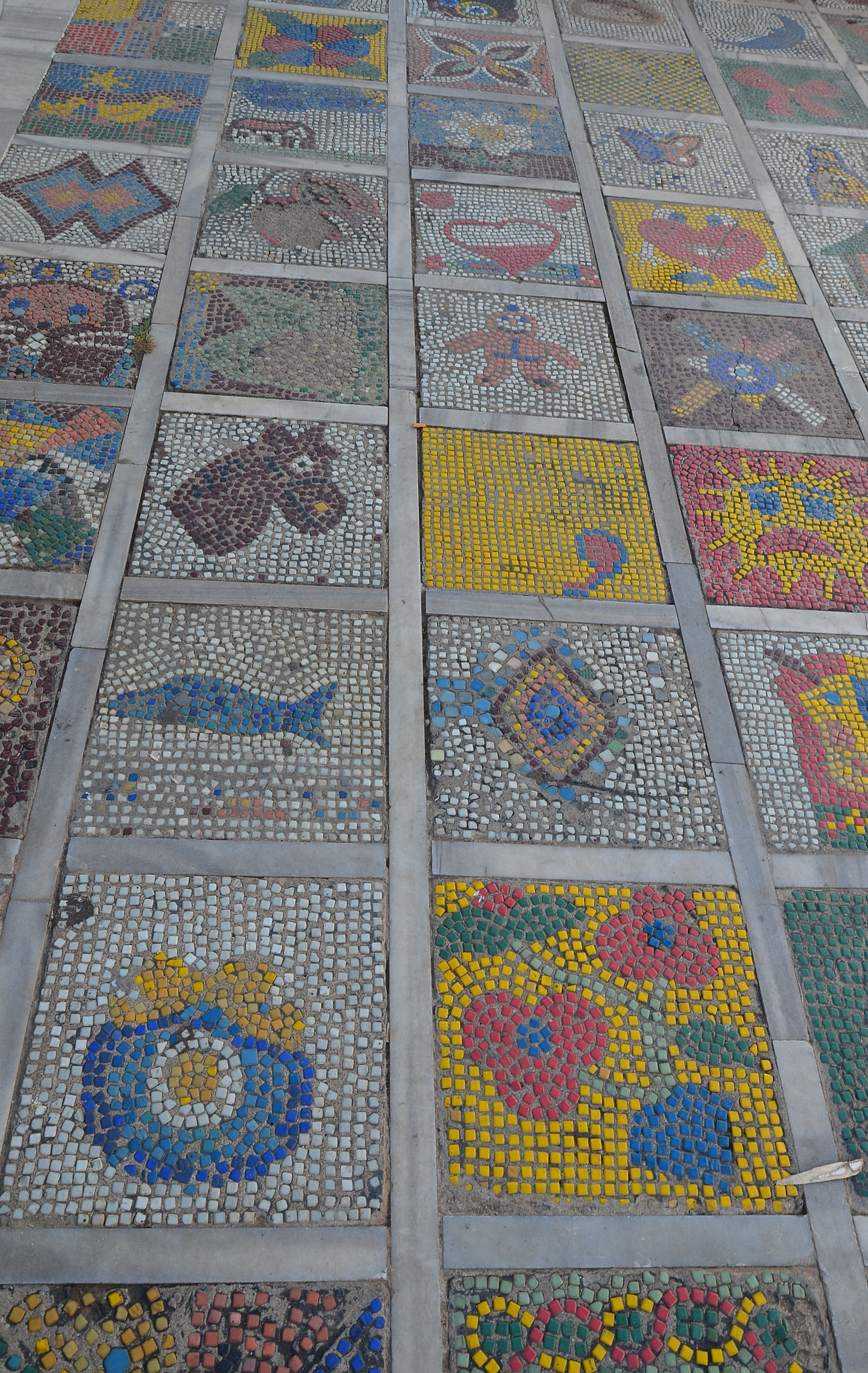
1999 Earthquake Monument in Yalova, Turkey

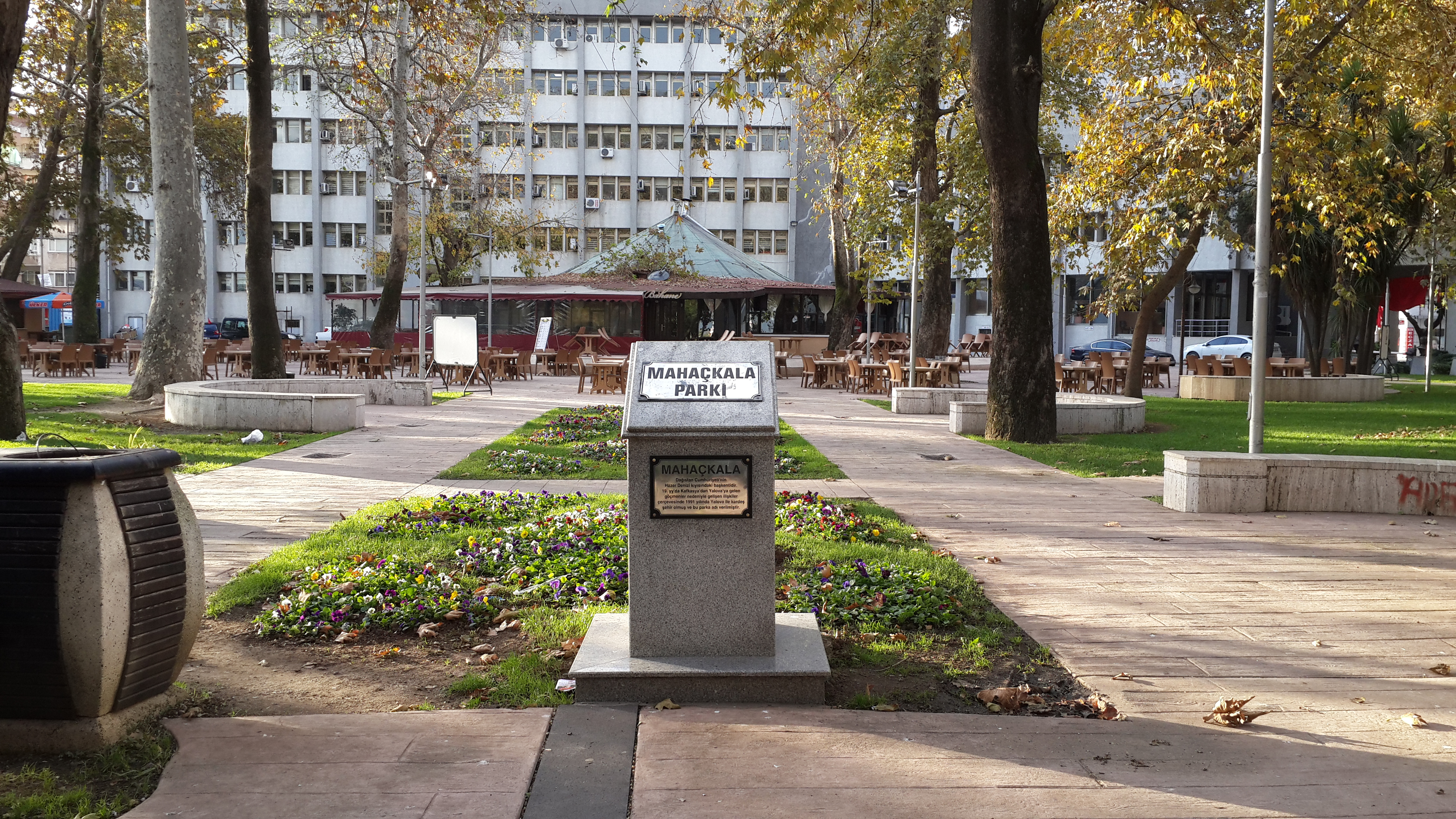
Mahaçkala Park in Yalova, Turkey

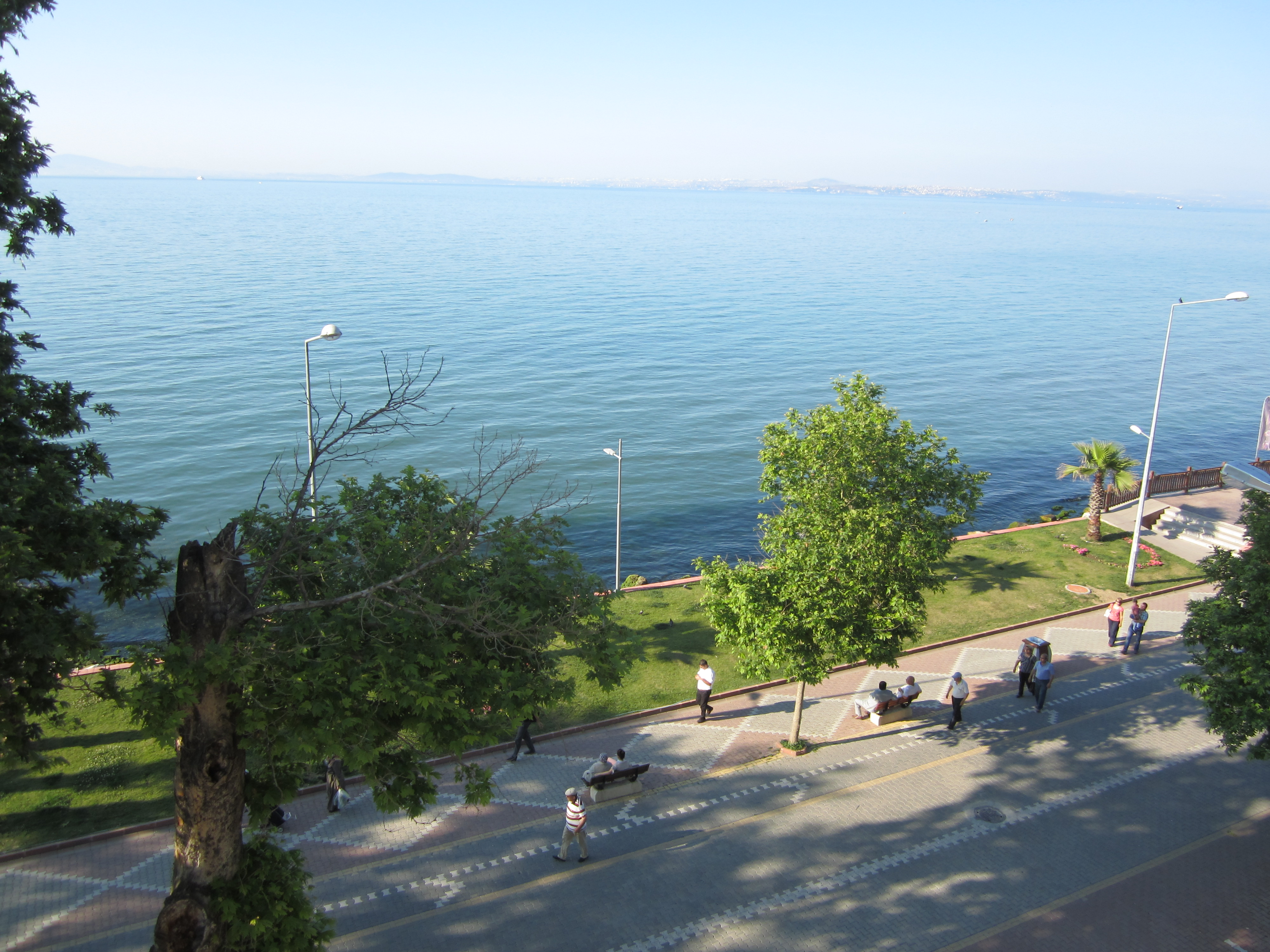
Seaside in Yalova, Turkey

=== Ancient Yalova ===
The first settlement in the region dates back to the Prehistoric Period, in around 3000 BC. The Hittites ruled the region in the 21st century BC, followed by the Phrygians in the 13th century BC, and then the Greeks in the archaic, classical and Hellenistic eras. The region was conquered by the Romans in 74 BC. After the fall of the Roman Empire, it became part of the Byzantine Empire.

In Antiquity and for most of the Middle Ages, the town was known as Pylai (Greek: Πύλαι), which is Greek for "gates", since it was positioned at the start of one of the main routes to Asia for anyone crossing the Sea of Marmara into Bithynia from Europe.

=== Middle Ages ===
In the Byzantine period the town retained importance due to its geographic location, and emperors frequently used it as a disembarkation point from Constantinople. Thus Emperor Heraclius landed here in 622, at the beginning of his counter-offensive against the Persians, and Romanos IV Diogenes did the same in 1071, on his way to the Battle of Manzikert. In the 9th century, the town was also the site of one of the beacons that transmitted news from the frontier with the Abbasid Caliphate, and contained an imperial hostel for travellers. In the late 10th century, however, Leo of Synada described Pylae as little more than a village, where cattle, horses, pigs and other animals were gathered to be shipped to Constantinople.

After their victory at Manzikert, the town and surrounding district were raided by the Seljuk Turks but soon recovered. In 1147 Greek refugees from Phrygia settled here. In a 1199 charter of privileges granted to Venetian merchants, it is listed as a separate fiscal district (episkepsi) along with neighbouring Pythia Therma, and it was a separate province by the time of the Fourth Crusade (1204). Following the fall of Constantinople to the Crusaders, Pylae formed part of the Empire of Nicaea, and served as the main port for Nicaea itself. Pylae remained in Byzantine hands until ca. 1302, when Turkish attacks intensified, forcing much of the population to abandon it and seek refuge in the Princes' Islands.

=== Ottoman and Republican eras ===
Shortly afterwards, Yalova was incorporated into the territory of the Ottoman Empire under the leadership of Orhan. It became part of the Sanjak of Kocaeli and was known successively as "Yalakabad" and "Yalıova". Since the second half of the 19th century, a large number of Avar immigrants from Dagestan moved into the town.

According to the Ottoman population statistics of 1914, the kaza of Yalova had a total population of 21,532, consisting of 10,274 Greeks, 7,954 Turks and 3,304 Armenians. On September 5, 1920, the city was captured by the Greek Army during the Greco-Turkish war, itself a part of the Turkish War of Independence. During the occupation by Greek forces, local Turkish and non-Turkish Muslim population were subjected to the Yalova Peninsula massacres. The Greeks and local collaborators terrorized the region and destroyed numerous villages, killing around 300 to 6,000 Muslim civilians. The massacres against the Muslim population ended when the Turkish Army recaptured Yalova on July 19, 1921.

Mustafa Kemal Atatürk occasionally lived in Yalova in his later years, claiming in one of his speeches that “Yalova is my city.”

Yalova was initially the centre for the Karamürsel district of Kocaeli Province. In 1930 it became a district centre in Istanbul province after joining two villages from Orhangazi. Finally in 1995 it became a provincial capital.

== Landmarks ==
Yürüyen Köşkü (Walking Pavilon) is a waterside villa used by Mustafa Kemal Atatürk, the founder of the modern Turkey, during his visits. It takes its name from the fact that Atatürk preferred to have it dismantled and moved slightly rather than cut down a tree that was impeding the view.

The Yalova Earthquake Monument in the 17 August Park on the coast of Marmara Sea commemorates the thousands of lives lost in August 1999 when a huge earthquake devastated the north-west corner of Turkey which included Yalova.

Yalova is known for the hot springs in the Termal district, which gets its name from the Greek word thermae (θερμαί) 'warm'. There appears to have been some sort of spa resort here since Byzantine times and the 17th-century travel writer Evliya Çelebi reported the existence of the Kurşunlu Banyo (Leaded Bath) at the time of his visit. The resort was expanded during the reign of Sultan Abdülhamid II and again during Atatürk's day.

Also in Termal is the Atatürk Arboretum which is said to contain 1800 different species of plant. It was commissioned by Atatürk in 1929 and was the first arboretum in the country. A summer-house used by Atatürk is open to the public.

== Sports ==
Yalovaspor BK is a basketball club that represents Yalova in the Turkish Super League.

The local football team is Yalovaspor, which plays in the Turkish Regional Amateur League.

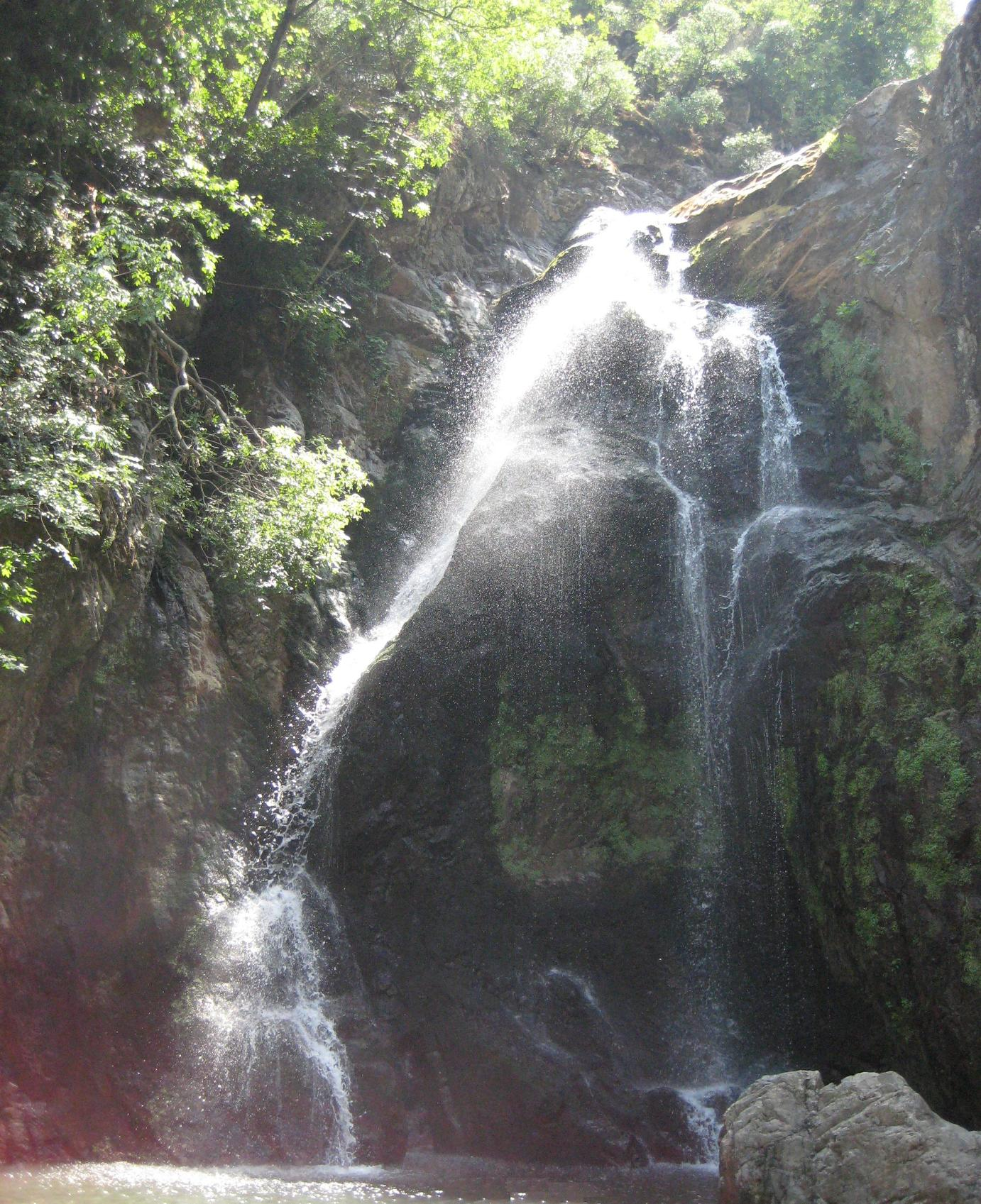
Sudüşen Waterfall, near Termal, Yalova

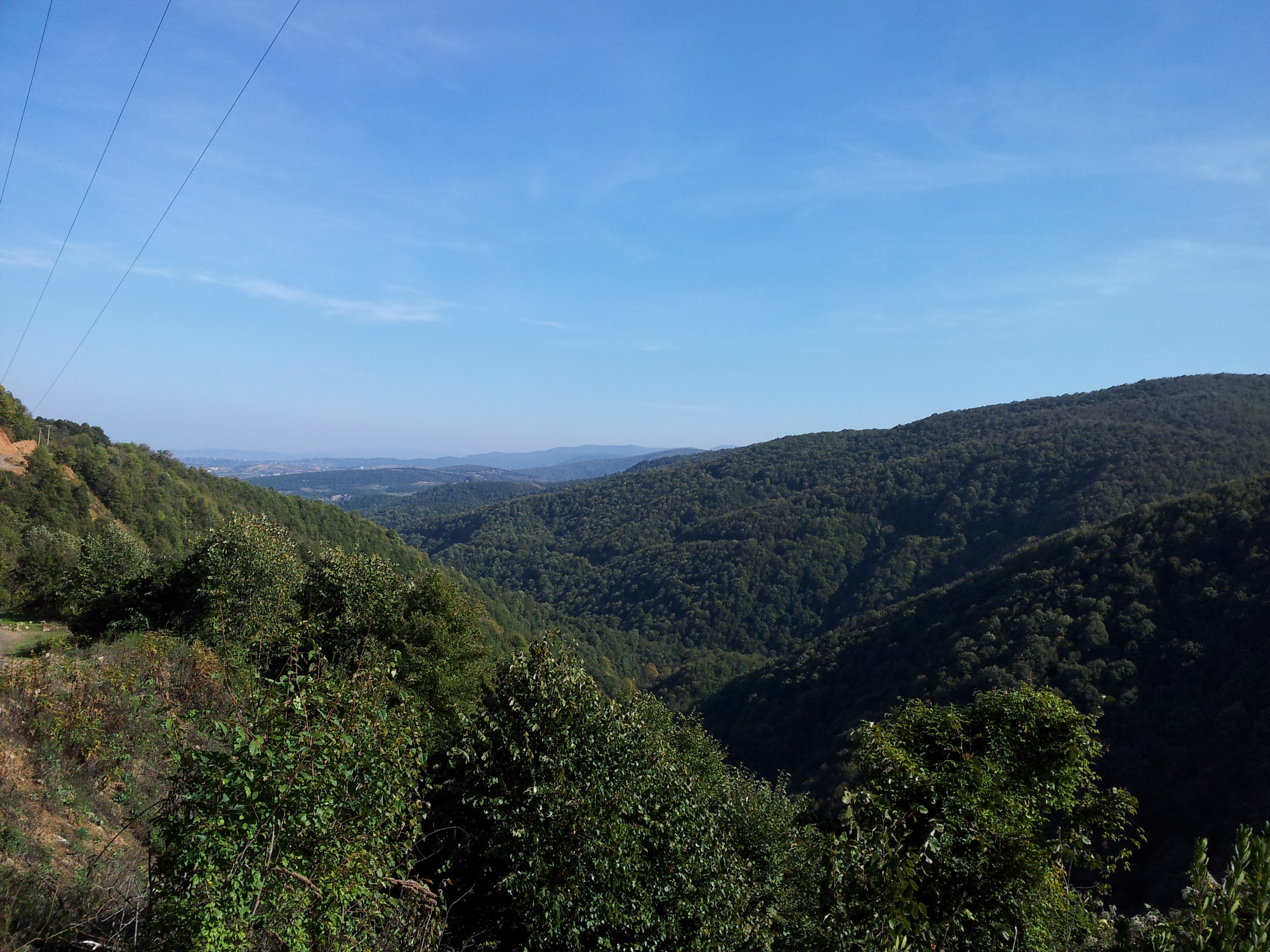
Mountains of Termal, Yalova

== Climate ==
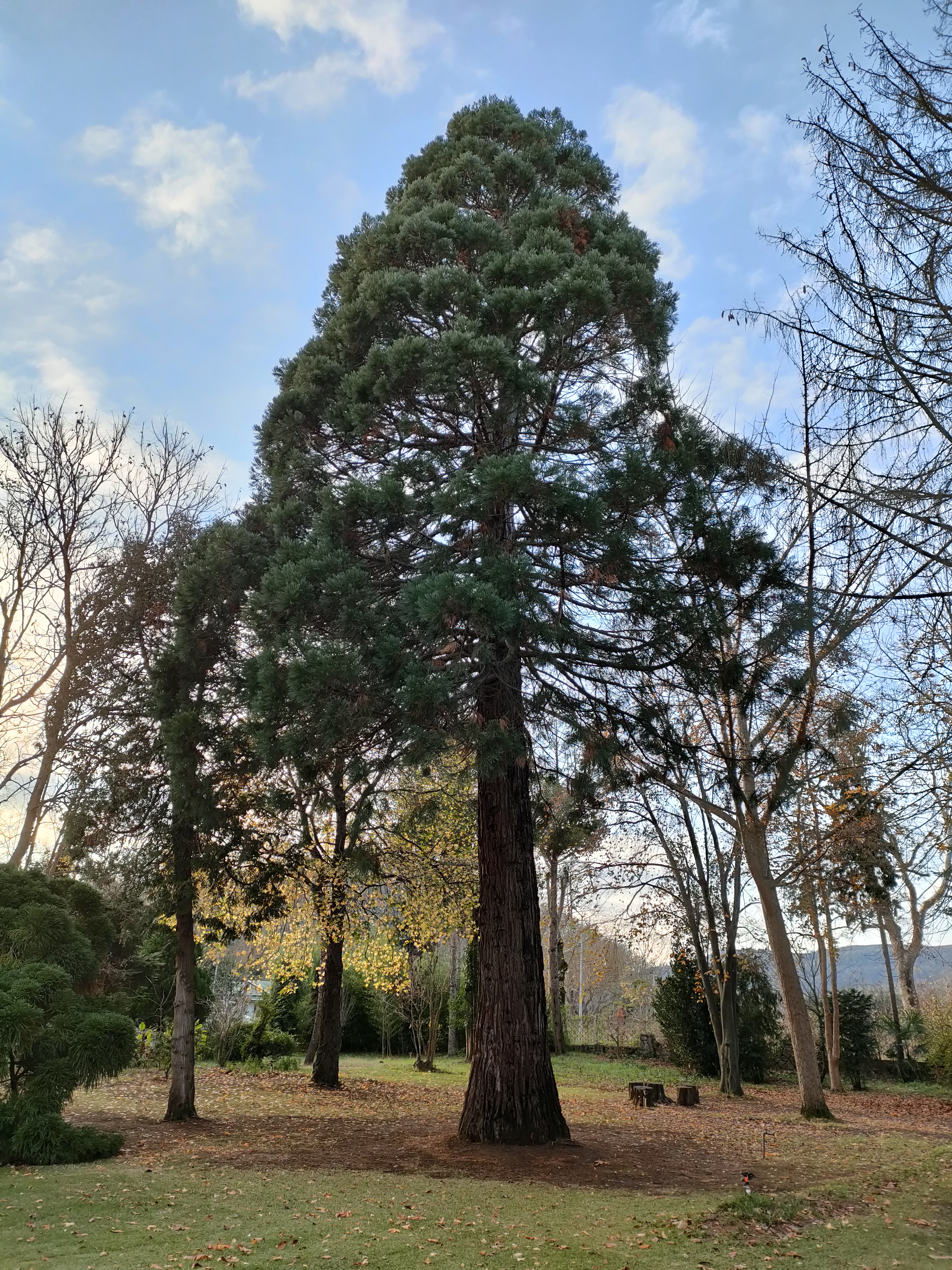
Sequoiadendron giganteum (Mamut Ağacı), Yalova, Turkey.

Yalova has a Mediterranean climate (Köppen: Csa, Trewartha: Cs), with cool, wet winters and hot, relatively dry summers.

Highest recorded temperature:42.1 °C (107.8 °F) on 27 June 2007
Lowest recorded temperature:−11.0 °C (12.2 °F) on 22 February 1985

Climate data for Yalova (1991–2020, extremes 1931–2023)
| Month | Jan | Feb | Mar | Apr | May | Jun | Jul | Aug | Sep | Oct | Nov | Dec | Year |
|---|---|---|---|---|---|---|---|---|---|---|---|---|---|
| Record high °C (°F) | 25.9 (78.6) | 27.2 (81.0) | 32.0 (89.6) | 36.5 (97.7) | 37.0 (98.6) | 42.1 (107.8) | 39.2 (102.6) | 40.2 (104.4) | 37.5 (99.5) | 36.6 (97.9) | 32.8 (91.0) | 27.4 (81.3) | 42.1 (107.8) |
| Mean daily maximum °C (°F) | 10.3 (50.5) | 11.2 (52.2) | 13.5 (56.3) | 17.6 (63.7) | 22.5 (72.5) | 27.1 (80.8) | 29.8 (85.6) | 30.1 (86.2) | 26.2 (79.2) | 21.1 (70.0) | 16.3 (61.3) | 12.0 (53.6) | 19.8 (67.6) |
| Daily mean °C (°F) | 6.8 (44.2) | 7.2 (45.0) | 9.0 (48.2) | 12.6 (54.7) | 17.4 (63.3) | 21.9 (71.4) | 24.3 (75.7) | 24.5 (76.1) | 20.8 (69.4) | 16.5 (61.7) | 12.0 (53.6) | 8.6 (47.5) | 15.1 (59.2) |
| Mean daily minimum °C (°F) | 3.7 (38.7) | 3.9 (39.0) | 5.2 (41.4) | 8.3 (46.9) | 12.8 (55.0) | 16.9 (62.4) | 19.1 (66.4) | 19.6 (67.3) | 16.1 (61.0) | 12.7 (54.9) | 8.4 (47.1) | 5.5 (41.9) | 11.0 (51.8) |
| Record low °C (°F) | −9.6 (14.7) | −11.0 (12.2) | −7.4 (18.7) | −1.6 (29.1) | 1.2 (34.2) | 7.1 (44.8) | 10.0 (50.0) | 10.3 (50.5) | 6.0 (42.8) | 1.3 (34.3) | −3.2 (26.2) | −9.2 (15.4) | −11.0 (12.2) |
| Average precipitation mm (inches) | 84.6 (3.33) | 68.7 (2.70) | 73.9 (2.91) | 51.3 (2.02) | 39.0 (1.54) | 47.4 (1.87) | 22.0 (0.87) | 34.5 (1.36) | 52.9 (2.08) | 93.7 (3.69) | 75.9 (2.99) | 105.0 (4.13) | 748.9 (29.48) |
| Average precipitation days | 15.6 | 13.67 | 13.37 | 10.87 | 7.9 | 6.37 | 3.6 | 3.73 | 7.23 | 11.43 | 11.33 | 15.2 | 120.3 |
| Average snowy days | 3.6 | 1.7 | 1 | 0 | 0 | 0 | 0 | 0 | 0 | 0 | 0.1 | 0.9 | 7.3 |
| Average relative humidity (%) | 73.6 | 73.1 | 72.9 | 72.1 | 72.3 | 70.7 | 70.5 | 72.3 | 72.9 | 77.1 | 75.0 | 72.8 | 72.9 |
| Mean monthly sunshine hours | 58.9 | 87.6 | 133.3 | 168.0 | 226.3 | 252.0 | 282.1 | 260.4 | 204.0 | 142.6 | 83.7 | 43.4 | 1,942.3 |
| Mean daily sunshine hours | 1.9 | 3.1 | 4.3 | 5.6 | 7.3 | 8.4 | 9.1 | 8.4 | 6.8 | 4.6 | 2.7 | 1.4 | 5.3 |
Source 1: Turkish State Meteorological Service
Source 2: NOAA (humidity), Meteomanz(snow days 2014-2023)

== International relations ==
Yalova is twinned with:

- (Georgia (country)) Batumi, Georgia
- Bilhorod-Dnistrovskyi, Ukraine
- Budva, Montenegro
- Khasavyurt, Russia
- Komotini, Greece
- Kyrenia, Cyprus
- Lefkoniko, Cyprus
- Makhachkala, Russia
- Medgidia, Romania
- Novi Pazar, Serbia
- Ohrid, North Macedonia
- Panjin, China
- (Kosovo) Peja, Kosova
- Rottenburg am Neckar, Germany
- Smolyan, Bulgaria
- Suwon, South Korea
- Tonami, Japan
- Travnik, Bosnia and Herzegovina
- Trogir, Croatia

== Notable natives ==
- Sarkis Minassian – Armenian journalist, killed in the Armenian genocide
- Muharrem İnce – Turkish politician
- İzel – Turkish singer
- Mehmet Okur – Turkish NBA basketball player
- Şebnem Ferah – Turkish singer
- Vefa Salman – Turkish politician
- Barbaros Binicioglu - Turkish politician
