= Yalova Province =

Province of Turkey

Coordinates: 40°38′39″N 29°11′37″E

Yalova Province Yalova ili
- Province
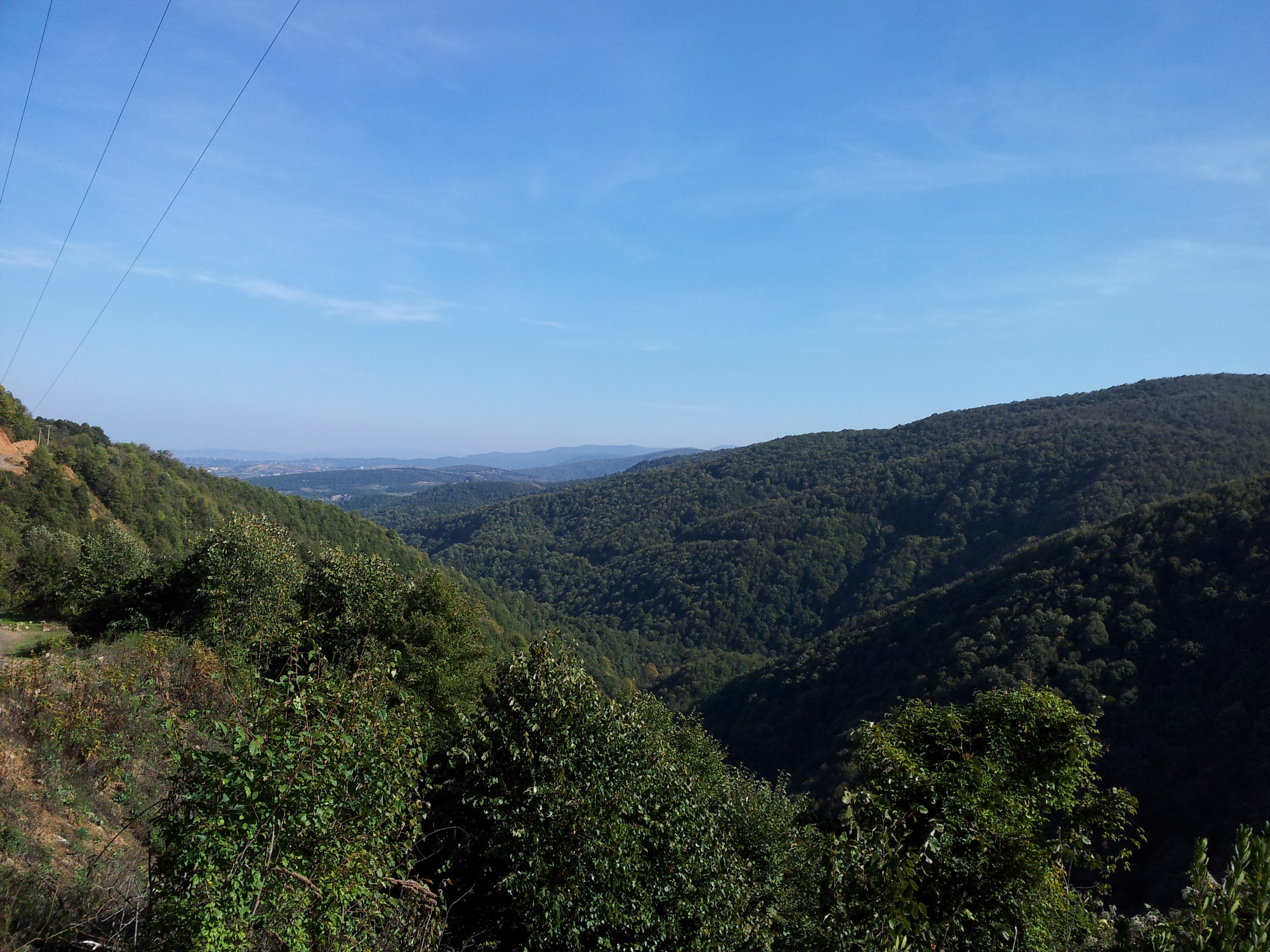
- Mountains of Termal

- Location of the province within Turkey
- Country: Turkey
- Seat: Yalova

Government
  - Governor: Ahmet Hamdi Usta
- Area: 798 km^{2} (308 sq mi)
- Population (2022): 296,333
  - Density: 371/km^{2} (962/sq mi)
- Time zone: UTC+3 (TRT)
- Area code: 0226
- ISO 3166 code: TR-77
- Website: www.yalova.gov.tr

Yalova Province (Turkish: Yalova ili) is a province in northwestern Turkey, on the eastern coast of the Sea of Marmara. Its adjacent provinces are Bursa to the south and Kocaeli to the east. Its area is 798 km^{2} (making it the smallest province of Turkey), and its population is 296,333 (2022). Prior to 1930, the area around Yalova constituted a district of Kocaeli Province; from 1930 to 1995, it was part of Istanbul Province; in 1995, the area was separated and made into the current Yalova Province. The provincial capital is the city of Yalova.

== Districts ==

Yalova Province is divided into six districts:

- Altınova
- Armutlu
- Çiftlikköy
- Çınarcık
- Termal
- Yalova

== Notable natives ==
- Muharrem İnce, Politician
- Mehmet Okur, NBA basketball player
- Şebnem Ferah, Singer
- İzel (İzel Çeliköz), Singer

== Gallery ==
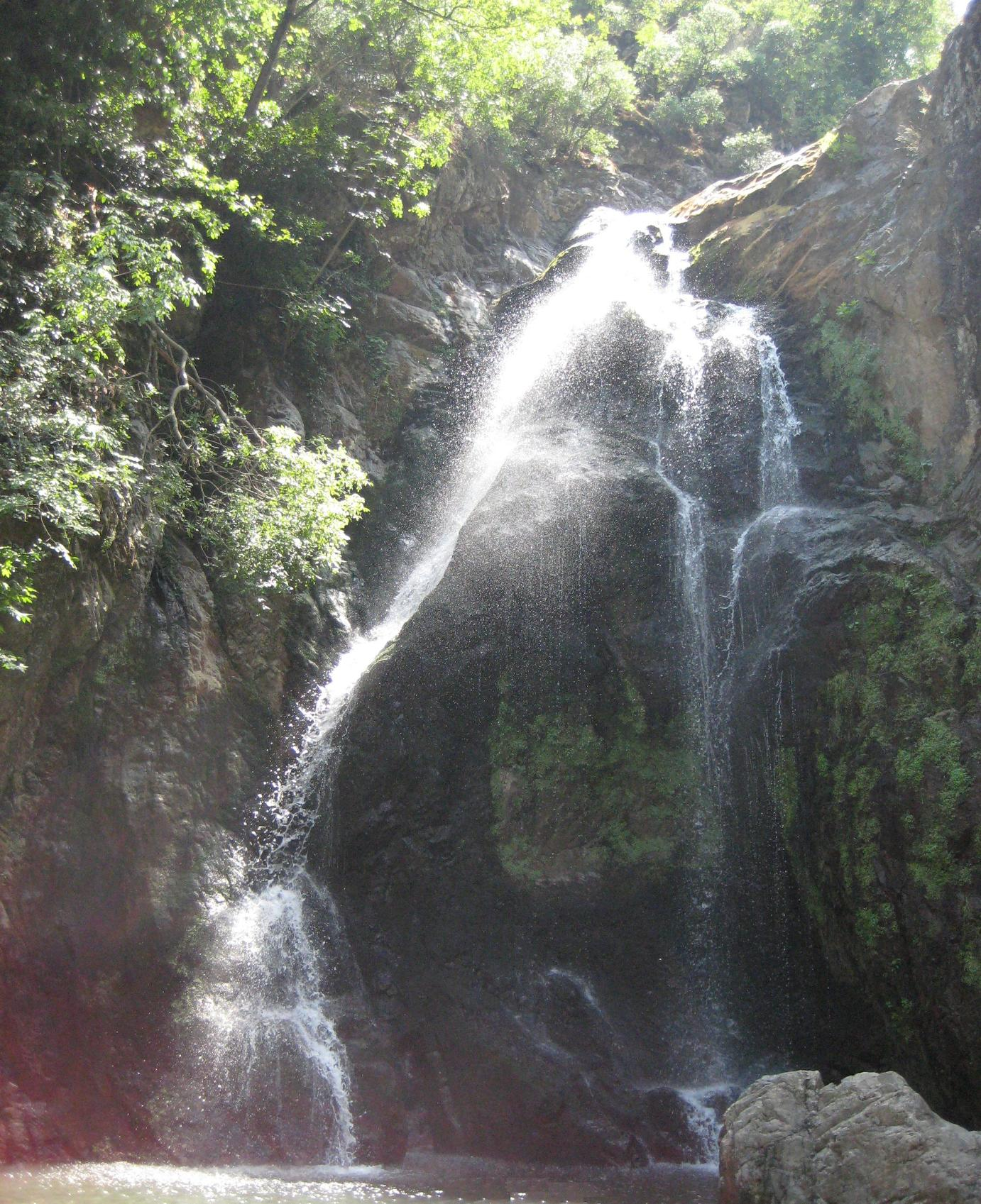
Su Düşen Waterfall, near Termal, Yalova

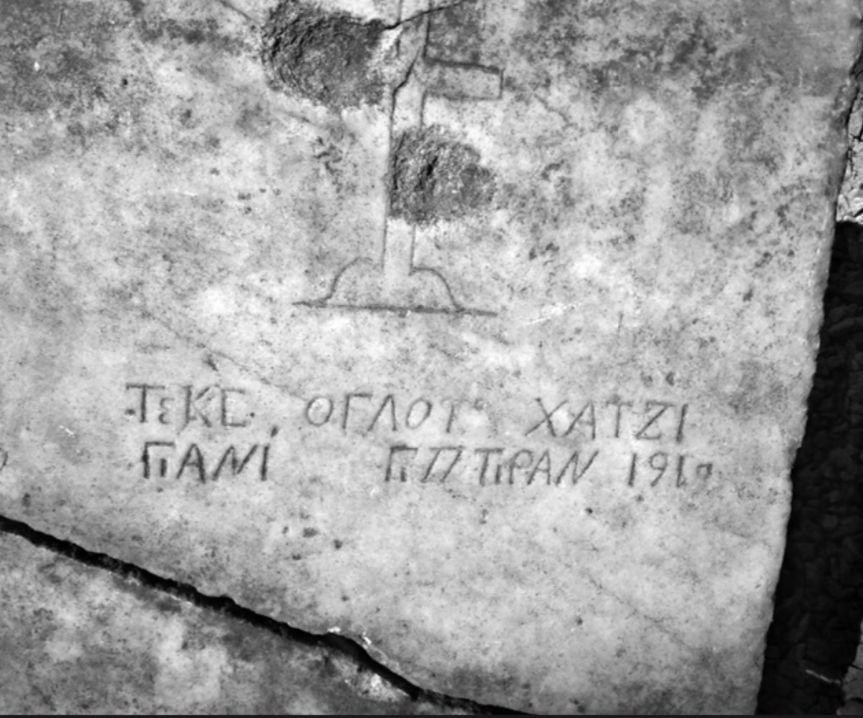
An inscription in Karamanli Turkish found on a tombstone in Elmalık, Yalova Province; it says ΤΕΚΕ ΟΓΛΟΥ ΧΑΤΖΙ ΓΙΑΝΙ ΓΙΠΤΙΡΑΝ 1910 'commissioned by Tekeoglou (or son of Teke) Hatzi Yani in 1910'.

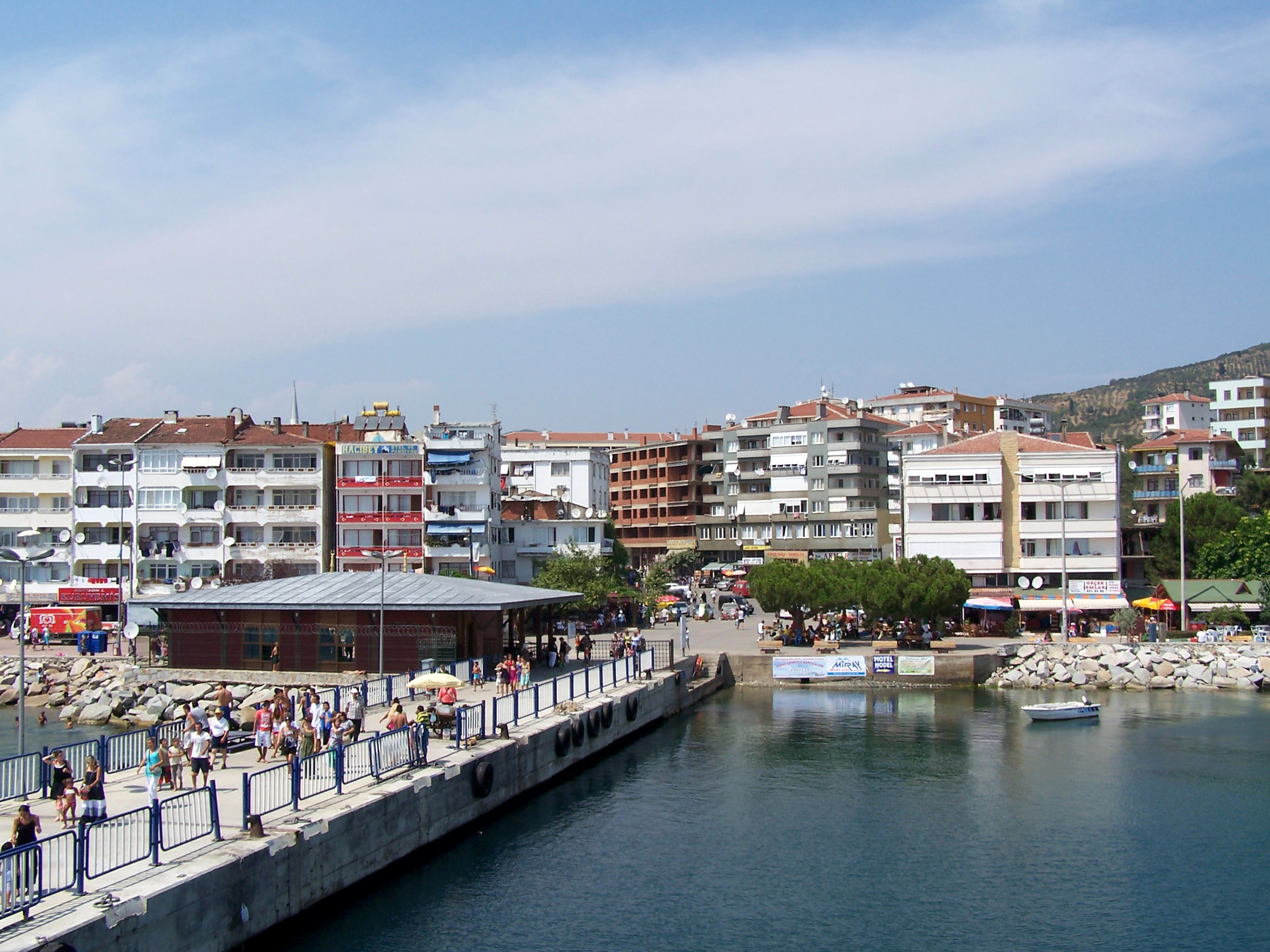
Ferry port of Armutlu

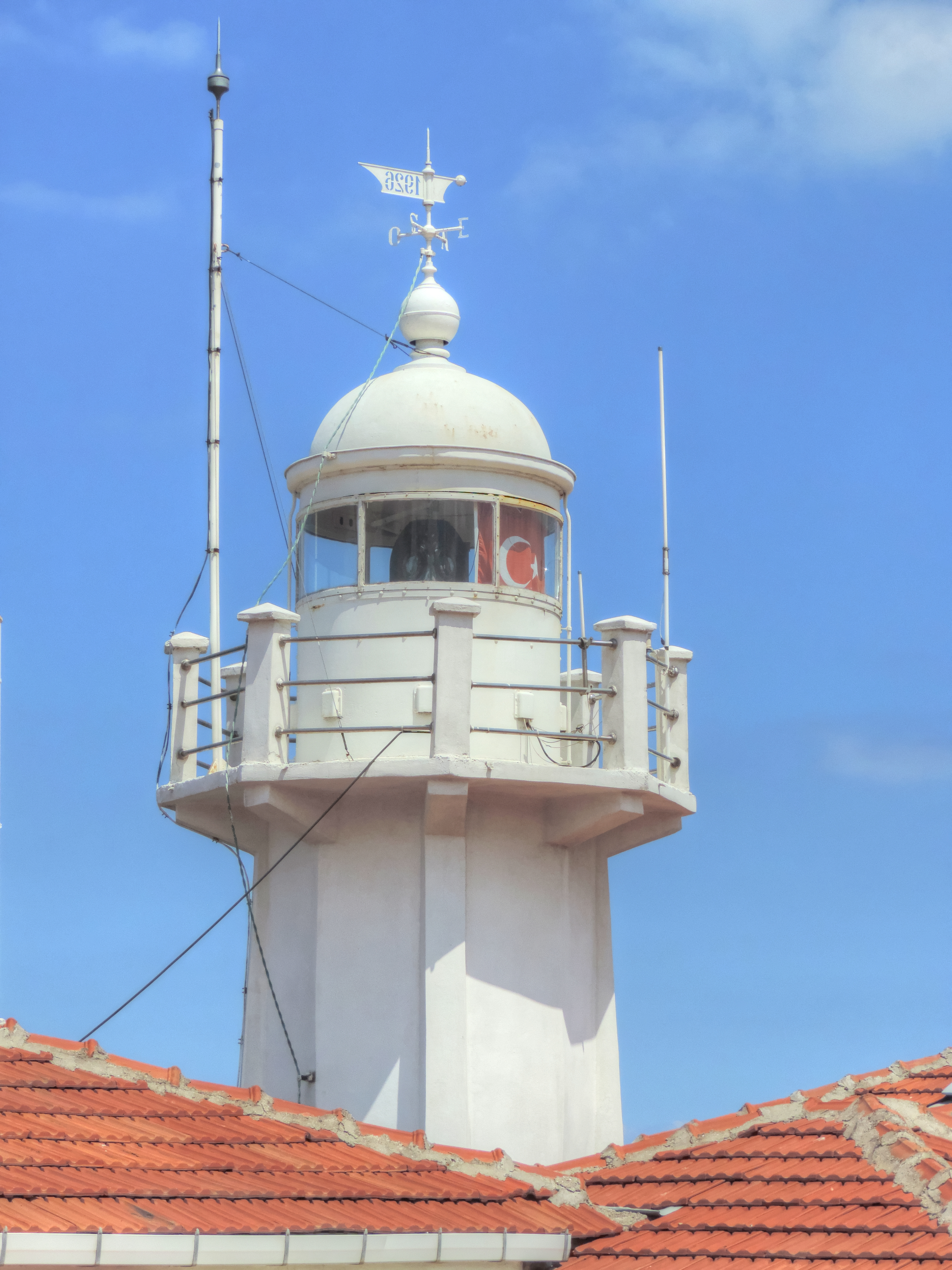
Bozburun Lighthouse, Armutlu.

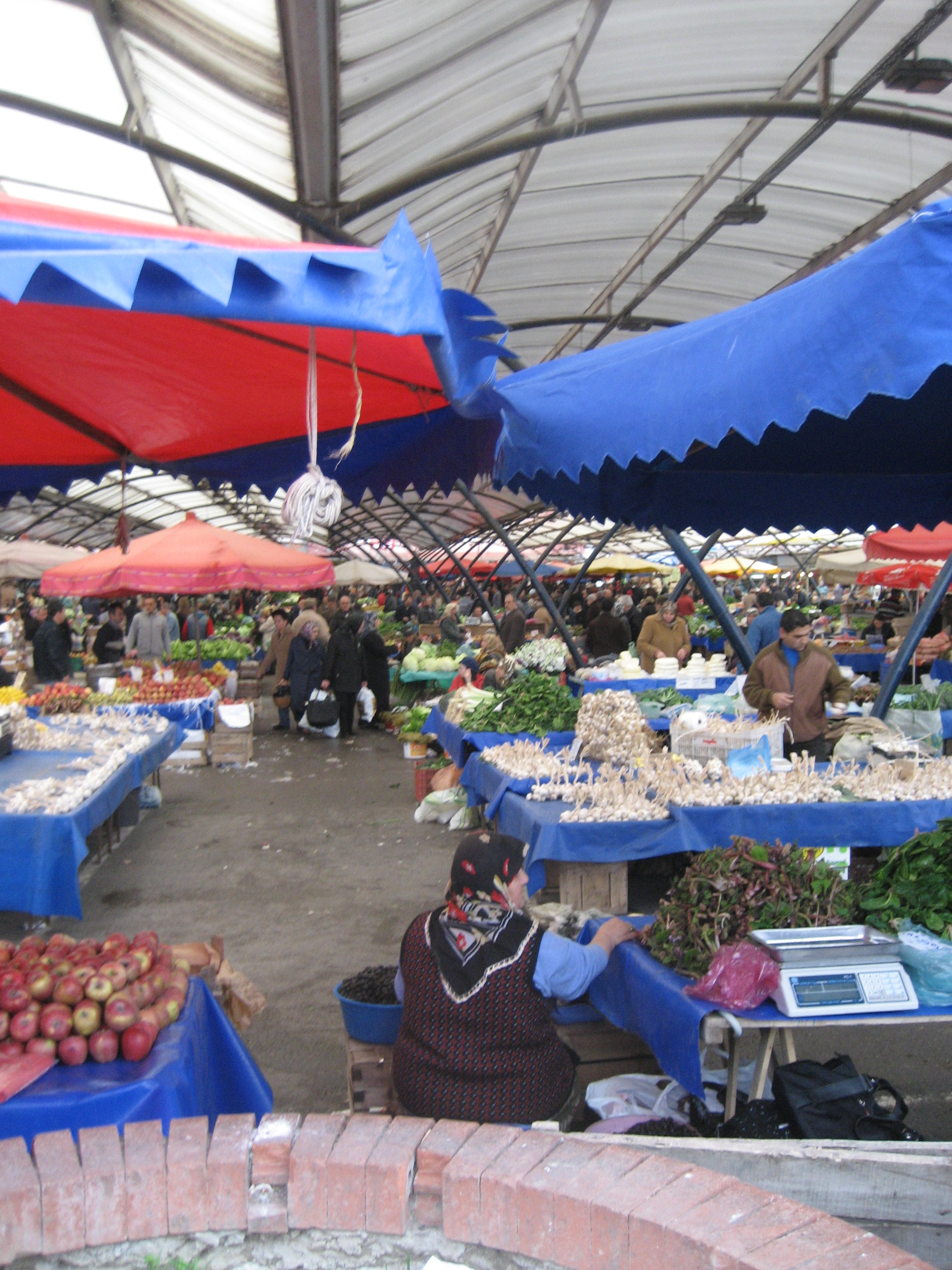
A market in Yalova
