= List of Ottoman palaces in Istanbul =

This is a list of palaces commissioned by the Ottoman dynasty in Istanbul, Turkey. Some of these buildings are summer houses or mansions.

Image	Name	Meaning of the name	Construction dates	Commissioned by	Notes
Topkapı Palace from the Bosphorus	Topkapı Palace	Mehmed II called the palace Sarây-ı Cedîd (New Palace). The palace received its current name during Mahmud I's reign when the seaside palace, the Cannon Gate Palace by the Sea (Topkapusu Sâhil Sarâyı) was destroyed in a fire, and its name was changed to the New Palace.	1460–1478	Mehmet II	The architects of the palace were Alaüddin and Davud Ağa.; A great fire occurred within the palace on 24 July 1665.
Aynalıkavak Palace	Aynalıkavak Palace (Note: The palace is also known as Aynalıkavak Pavilion)	The palace is also called Tersane Palace (Shipyard Palace) though it has been referred to as “Aynalikavak Palace” since the 17th century.	1613–1614	Ahmed I	Sultan Ibrahim was born in the palace.; The Treaty of Aynalıkavak between the Ottoman Empire and Russian Empire was signed in the palace on March 10, 1779.
Yıldız Palace	Yıldız Palace	The name Yıldız comes from the Turkish word meaning "star".	The end of the 18th century.	Selim III (Note: Sultan Selim III built the palace for his mother, Mihrişah)	The palace was the residence of Abdul Hamid II from 1889 until 1909.
Aynalıkavak Palace	Maslak Pavilion		The beginning of the 19th century.	Mahmud II	The pavilion was the used as a hunting lodge and place of recreation by Abdul Hamid II when he was a prince.
Beykoz Pavilion or Beykoz Mecidiye Summer Palace	Beykoz Pavilion	The pavilion is also called Mecidiye Pavilion.	1845	Muhammad Ali of Egypt	The pavilion was used by Abdülmecid I for rides in Beykoz pastures.
Dolmabahçe Palace as seen from the Bosphorus	Dolmabahçe Palace	The name Dolmabahçe comes from the Turkish dolma meaning "filled" and from the Persian bahçe meaning "garden."	1843–1856	Abdülmecid I	The palace was the residence of Ottoman sultans from 1853 until 1889, and from 1909 until 1922.; The architect of the palace was Garabet Balyan.
Ihlamur Pavilion Ceremonial House	Ihlamur Pavilion	The name Ihlamur comes from Greek and means "tilia".	1849–1855	Abdülmecid I	The architect of the palace was Nigoğayos Balyan.
Küçüksu Pavilion seen from the Bosphorus	Küçüksu Pavilion	The name Küçüksu comes from the Turkish küçük meaning "small" and su meaning "water".	1856–1857	Abdülmecid I	The architect of the palace was Nigoğayos Balyan.
Beylerbeyi Palace from the Bosphorus	Beylerbeyi Palace	The name Beylerbeyi comes from the Turkish beylerbey meaning "Lord of Lords".	1863–1865	Abdulaziz	The architect of the palace was Sarkis Balyan.
Çırağan Palace seen from Bosporus	Çırağan Palace	The name Çırağan comes from the Persian čerâğ meaning torch. The area in which the Palace is located was called Çırağan because of the famous Ottoman parties which were held in tulip gardens with torches.	1863–1871	Abdulaziz	The architect of the palace was Nigoğayos Balyan.; The structural engineers of the palace were Sarkis Balyan and Hagop Balyan.
Feriye Palace today	Feriye Palace	The name Feriye means auxiliary or secondary in Ottoman Turkish.	1871	Abdulaziz	The architect of the palace was Sarkis Balyan.
	Vahdettin Pavilion	The pavilion is also called Çengelköy Pavilion.	The end of the 19th century.	Abdul Hamid II	The architect of the pavilion was Alexander Vallaury.; The pavilion was a residence of Mehmed VI when he was a prince.

== See also ==
- Ottoman architecture
- Pavilion
