= List of patrol vessels of the Ottoman steam navy =

This is a list of patrol naval vessels of the Ottoman Navy:

== Gunboats ==
=== Torpedo gunboat (Torpido gambotu) ===
==== Peleng-i Deryâ class ====
Name (Namesake)	Builder Dimensions Displacement, Hull Speed Complement	Machinery Boiler, Bunkers Engines Armament	Ordered Laid down Launched Trials	Commissioned Decommissioned Afterward
Peleng-i Deryâ ("Tiger of the Sea")	Schiffswerft Germania AG, Kiel; LOA 75.5m, LPP 72.0m, B 8.5m, D 2.9m 755t / 900 t (full road), Steel; 9 officers, 11 non-commissioned officers, 60 ratings (1896), 12 officers, 15 non-commissioned officers, 83 ratings (1914)	Steam, 2 shafts 4 locomotive type, Germania, 175t coal 2 triple expansion, 4700ihp, Germania; 2x10.5 cm (4.1 in) QF K, 6x46mm QF K, 3xTT 355mm SK (1896), 2x120mm QF K, 2x90mm QF K, 3xTT 355 SK, 3xMG (1906), 3x75mm QF K, 4x47mm QF N, 3xTT 355mm SK	1887; 1890; 1891; 16 May 1896; 22 May 1896 killed by boiler explosion at Eckernförke	Sep. 1896; 1913 laid up in very poor condition Sep. 1914 returned to service 23 May 1915 torpedoed and sunk by British submarine HMS E11 near Bakırköy. 1915 wreck towed to Constantinople; 1920 broken up.
Nimet ("Blessing")	Schiffswerft Germania AG, Kiel; LOA 75.5m, LPP 72.0m, B 8.5m, D 2.9m 755t / 900 t (full road), Steel; 9 officers, 11 non-commissioned officers, 60 ratings (1896), 12 officers, 15 non-commissioned officers, 83 ratings (1914)	Steam, 2 shafts 4 locomotive type, Germania, 175t coal 2 triple expansion, 4700ihp, Germania; 2x10.5 cm (4.1 in) QF K, 6x46mm QF K, 3xTT 355mm SK (1896), 2x120mm QF K, 2x90mm QF K, 3xTT 355 SK, 3xMG (1906), 3x75mm QF K, 4x47mm QF N, 3xTT 355mm SK (1915)	1887; 1889; 30 Jan. 1890; 1893 order cancelled by Germania; 1893 Work at Constantinople stopped 1909 hull laid up and scrapped.	- - - -

==== Şahin-i Deryâ ====
Name (Namesake)	Builder Dimensions Displacement, Hull Speed Complement	Machinery Boiler, Bunkers Engines Armament	Ordered Laid down Launched Trials	Commissioned Decommissioned Afterward
Şahin-i Deryâ' ("Hawk of the Sea")	Tersâne-i Âmire, Istanbul; LPP 60.9m, B 7.0m, D 2.4m 443t, Steel - 8 officers, 75 ratings (design)	Steam, 2 shafts 4 locomotive type, 100t coal 2 triple expansion 3500ihp, Tersâne-Âmire; 1x105mm QF K, 6x47mm QF H, 4xTT 355mm SK (1889 design), 6x47mm QF H, 4xTT 355mm SK (1895 design)	May 1888; 1888; 16 Aug. 1892; 1896 work stopped 1909 machinery removed 1909 sold for breaking up.	- - - -

=== Gunboat (Gambot) ===
==== Akka class ====
Name (Namesake)	Builder Dimensions Displacement, Hull Speed Complement	Machinery Boiler, Bunkers Engines Armament	Ordered Laid down Launched Trials	Commissioned Decommissioned Afterward
Akka (Acre)	J&R White, Southampton; LOA 35.4m, B 6.0m, D 2.7m 196t BOM (1860), 120t (1898), Wood (1860), Steel (1898); 8kts (trial), 10kts (1898); 70 (1860), 45 (1898)	Steam, 1 shahft 1 White (1860), 1 double ended, Tersâne-i Âmire, 80t coal 1 single acting 1 cyl., 225ihp, Maudslay	1857; 1859; 1859; 1859	Dec. 1859; 1879 laid up at Constantinople; 1883 renewed by Tersâne-i Âmire, Istanbul; 1885 returned to service 1901 decommissioned 1903 breaking up at Basra.
Şevket Nümâ ("Guide to Imperial Majesty")	Money Wigram, Blackwall, London; LOA 35.4m, B 6.0m, D 2.7m 196t BOM (1860), 120t (1898), Wood (1860), Steel (1898); 8kts (trial), 10kts (1898); 70 (1860), 45 (1898)	Steam, 1 shahft 1 Money Wigram (1860), 1 double ended, Tersâne-i Âmire, 80t coal 1 single acting 1 cyl., 225ihp, Maudslay	1859; 1859; 1859; 1859	Mar. 1860; 1879 laid up at Constantinople; 1892 drydocked for refurbishment by Tersâne-i Âmire, Istanbul; 31 Aug. 1894 steel hull launched 1898 returned to service 1908 decommissioned Apr. 1915 reactivated Oct. 1918 decommissionaed 1925 sold for breaking up.
Varna/Necm-i Feşân (Varna)	Money Wigram, Blackwall, London; LOA 35.4m, B 6.0m, D 2.7m 196t BOM (1860), 120t (1898), Wood (1860), Steel (1898); 8kts (trial), 10kts (1898); 70 (1860), 45 (1898)	Steam, 1 shahft 1 Money Wigram (1860), 1 double ended, Tersâne-i Âmire, 80t coal 1 single acting 1 cyl., 225ihp, Maudslay	1857; 1858; 1859; 1859	Mar. 1860 as Varna; 1879 renamed Necm-i Feşân; 1902 stationary at Sarıyer; Aug. 1908 towed to Constantinople, laid up Nov. 1909 sold for breaking up.
Sünne (Sulina)	Money Wigram, Blackwall, London; LOA 35.4m, B 6.0m, D 2.7m 196t BOM (1860), 120t (1898), Wood (1860), Steel (1898); 8kts (trial), 10kts (1898); 70 (1860), 45 (1898)	Steam, 1 shahft 1 Money Wigram (1860), 1 double ended, Tersâne-i Âmire, 80t coal 1 single acting 1 cyl., 225ihp, Maudslay	1857; 1858; 1859; 1859	Aug. 1859; 9 Oct. 1877 sunk by Russian mine in the mouth of the Danube.

==== Mûsul class ====
Name (Namesake)	Builder Dimensions Displacement, Hull Speed Complement	Machinery Boiler, Bunkers Engines Armament	Ordered Laid down Launched Trials	Commissioned Decommissioned Afterward
Mûsul (Musul)	Tersâne-i Âmire, Istanbul; LPP 39.9m, B 6.4m, D 2.8m 276t BM, 125t, Wood; 9kts (trial); 35	Steam, 1 shaft 1, 25t coal 1 1cyl. 4x19pdr (1866), 2x57mm QF K, 2x37mm RC (1881)	1863; 1865; 1865; 1866	1866; 1909
Seyyâr ("Travelling")	Tersâne-i Âmire, Istanbul; LPP 39.9m, B 6.4m, D 2.8m 276t BM, 125t, Wood; 9kts (trial); 35	Steam, 1 shaft 1, 25t coal 1 1cyl. 4x19pdr (1866), 2x57mm QF K, 2x37mm RC (1881)	1863; 1865; 1865; 1866	1866; 1891 stationary at Arnavutköy; 1909 decommissioned

==== Sahir ====
Name (Namesake)	Builder Dimensions Displacement, Hull Speed Complement	Machinery Boiler, Bunkers Engines Armament	Ordered Laid down Launched Trials	Commissioned Decommissioned Afterward
Sahir ("Vigilant")	J White, West Cowes, Isle of Wight; LPP 40.4m, B 6.7m, D 3.2m 259t BM, 163t, Wood; 8kts (trial); 35	Steam, 1 shaft 1, 20t coal 1, 1 cyl. 4x11pdr (1866), 2x76mm QF, 2xMG	1864; 1866; 1866; 1866	1866; 1900; 11 Nov. 1909 sold for breaking up.

==== İntibâh class ====
Name (Namesake)	Builder Dimensions Displacement, Hull Speed Complement	Machinery Boiler, Bunkers Engines Armament	Ordered Laid down Launched Trials	Commissioned Decommissioned Afterward
İntibâh ("Vigilance")	Tersâne-i Âmire, Istanbul; LPP 40.4m, B 6.7m, D 3.2m 259t BM, 125t, Wood; 12kts (trial), 8kts (1880); 35	Steam, 1 shaft 1, 20t coal 1 1 cyl. 4x18pdr (1866), 2x100mm, 1x57mm (1877), 4x76mm QF K, 2xMG H (1880)	1865; 1865; 1866; 1866	1866; 26 Jan. 1878 sunk by Russian torpedo at Batumi.
Müjde Resân' ("Bearer of Good tidings")	Tersâne-i Âmire, Istanbul; LPP 40.4m, B 6.7m, D 3.2m 259t BM, 125t, Wood; 12kts (trial), 8kts (1880); 35	Steam, 1 shaft 1, 20t coal 1 1 cyl. 4x18pdr (1866), 2x100mm, 1x57mm (1877), 4x76mm QF K, 2xMG H (1880)	1865; 1865; 1866; 1866	1866; 1888-89 refitted by Tersâne-i Âmire, Istanbul; 1889 based at Basra; 1908 decommissioned, sold for breaking up at Basra.
Ziver-i Deryâ ("Wolf of the Sea")	Tersâne-i Âmire, Istanbul; LPP 40.4m, B 6.7m, D 3.2m 259t BM, 125t, Wood; 12kts (trial), 8kts (1880); 35	Steam, 1 shaft 1, 20t coal 1 1 cyl. 4x18pdr (1866), 2x100mm, 1x57mm (1877), 4x76mm QF K, 2xMG H (1880)	1865; 1865; 1866; 1866	1866; 1909

==== Saheddin ====
Name (Namesake)	Builder Dimensions Displacement, Hull Speed Complement	Machinery Boiler, Bunkers Engines Armament	Ordered Laid down Launched Trials	Commissioned Decommissioned Afterward
Saheddin ()	Tersâne-i Âmire, Istanbul; LPP 40.4m, B 6.7m, D 3.2m 259t BM, 125t, Wood; 12kts (trial), 8kts (1880); 35	Steam, 1 shaft 1, 20t coal 1 1 cyl. 4x18pdr (1866), 2x100mm (1877), 4x76mm QF K, 2xMG H (1880)	1865; 1867; 1868; 1868	1865; 1909 stationary at Tripoli; 3 Oct. 1911 run on the rocks at Tripoli.

==== Aynalıkavak class ====
Name (Namesake)	Builder Dimensions Displacement, Hull Speed Complement	Machinery Boiler, Bunkers Engines Armament	Ordered Laid down Launched Trials	Commissioned Decommissioned Afterward
Aynalı Kavak (Aynalı Kavak)	Tersâne-i Âmire, Istanbul; LPP 35.9m, B 5.3m, D 1.8m 195t, Wood; 10kts (trial), 7kts (1877); 35	Steam, 1 shaft 1, 20t coal 1 1cyl. 1x8pdr, 1x4pdr (1868), 1x8pdr, 2x4pdr (1874), 1x57mm QF K, 2xMG (1888)	1867; 1867; 1867; 1969	1869; 1888 refitted by Tersâne-i Âmire, Istanbul; 1909 decommissioned
Yalı Köşkü (Yalı Köşkü)	Tersâne-i Âmire, Istanbul; LPP 35.9m, B 5.3m, D 1.8m 195t, Wood; 10kts (trial), 7kts (1877); 35	Steam, 1 shaft 1, 20t coal 1 1cyl. 1x8pdr, 1x4pdr (1868), 1x8pdr, 2x4pdr (1874), 1x57mm QF K, 2xMG (1888)	1867; 1867; 1867; 1969	1869; 1889 service vessel for government personnel 1909 decommissioned

==== Rodos class ====
Name (Namesake)	Builder Dimensions Displacement, Hull Speed Complement	Machinery Boiler, Bunkers Engines Armament	Ordered Laid down Launched Trials	Commissioned Decommissioned Afterward
Rodos (Rhodes)	Tersâne-i Âmire, Istanbul; LPP 35.7m, B 5.3m, D 1.8m 203t BM, Wood; 12kts (trial), 8kts (1875); 35	Steam, 1 shaft 1, 20t coal 1 1cyl., Tersâne-i Âmire, Istanbul; 4x11pdr (1870), 2x57mm QF, 2xMG H (1885)	1868; 1869; 1870; 1870	1870; 1890 laid up at Constantinople; 1899 decommissioned 1903 sold for breaking up.
İstanköy (Kos)	Tersâne-i Âmire, Istanbul; LPP 35.7m, B 5.3m, D 1.8m 203t BM, Wood; 12kts (trial), 8kts (1875); 35	Steam, 1 shaft 1, 20t coal 1 1cyl., Tersâne-i Âmire, Istanbul; 4x11pdr (1870), 2x57mm QF, 2xMG H (1885)	1868; 1869; 1871; 1874	1874; 1902 starionary at Vathi (Samos Island); 1909 decommissioned 1910 sp;d for breaking up.

==== Fırat class ====
Name (Namesake)	Builder Dimensions Displacement, Hull Speed Complement	Machinery Boiler, Bunkers Engines Armament	Ordered Laid down Launched Trials	Commissioned Decommissioned Afterward
Fırat (Euphrates)	Tersâne-i Âmire, Istanbul; LPP 37.0m, B 6.5m, D 2.4m 197t, Wood; 10kts (trial); 55	Steam, 1 shaft 1 cyl., Tersâne-i Âmire, 80t coal 1 compound 2 cyl., 280ihp, Tersâne-i Âmire; 4x76 QF K, 2x57mm QF K (1885), 2x90mm QF K, 1x47mm QF K, 1x37mm QF H (1895), 2x37mm QF H, 2xGatling gun	1881; 1881; 1883; 1885	1885; Feb. 1897 damaged by gunfire of Greek gunboat Aphroessa in the Gulf of Narda. 1899 returned to service 1912 decommissioned.
Şat (Tigris)	Tersâne-i Âmire, Istanbul; 1899 returned to service 1912 decommissioned LPP 37.0m, B 6.5m, D 2.4m 197t, Wood; 10kts (trial); 55	Steam, 1 shaft 1 cyl., Tersâne-i Âmire, 80t coal 1 compound 2 cyl., 280ihp, Tersâne-i Âmire; 4x76 QF K, 2x57mm QF K (1885), 2x90mm QF K, 1x47mm QF K, 1x37mm QF H (1895), 2x37mm QF H, 2xGatling gun	1881; 1881; 1883; 1885	1885; 1906 stationary at Therapia; Aug. 1908 laid up at Kasımpaşa; Nov. 1909 sold for breaking up.

==== Nâsr-ü Hüdâ class ====
Name (Namesake)	Builder Dimensions Displacement, Hull Speed Complement	Machinery Boiler, Bunkers Engines Armament	Ordered Laid down Launched Trials	Commissioned Decommissioned Afterward
Nâsr-ü Hüdâ ("God's help for Victory")	Tersâne-i Âmire, Istanbul; LPP 38.6m, B 5.4m, D 1.9m 198t, 80t coal 10kts (trial), 8kts (1915); 9 officers, 36 ratings	Steam, 1 shaft 1 double ended, Tersâne-i Âmire; 1 triple expansion vertical, 400ihp, Tersâne-i Âmire; 1x76mm QF K, 2x47mm QF K, 1x37mm QF H (1904), 1x57mm QF K, 2x47mm QF K (1915)	Oct. 1890; 1903; 1903; 1904	1904; 1914 laid up Apr. 1915 reactivated Jun. 1917 decommissioned 1923 sold for breaking up.
Seyyâr ("Traveling")	Tersâne-i Âmire, Istanbul; LPP 38.6m, B 5.4m, D 1.9m 198t, 80t coal 10kts (trial), 8kts (1915); 9 officers, 36 ratings	Steam, 1 shaft 1 double ended, Tersâne-i Âmire; 1 triple expansion vertical, 400ihp, Tersâne-i Âmire; 1x76mm QF K, 2x47mm QF K, 1x37mm QF H (1904), 1x57mm QF K, 2x47mm QF K (1915)	Oct. 1890; 1896; 1906; 1905	1906; 1914 laid up Apr. 1915 reactivated as mine hunting boat Oct. 1918 decommissioned 1923 sold for breaking up.
Bârika-i Zafer ("Flash of Victory")	Tersâne-i Âmire, Istanbul; LPP 38.6m, B 5.4m, D 1.9m 198t, 80t coal 10kts (trial), 8kts (1915); 9 officers, 36 ratings	Steam, 1 shaft 1 double ended, Tersâne-i Âmire; 1 triple expansion vertical, 400ihp, Tersâne-i Âmire; 1x76mm QF K, 2x47mm QF K, 1x37mm QF H (1904), 1x57mm QF K, 2x47mm QF K (1915)	Oct. 1890; 1896; 1904; 1908	1908; Oct. 1918 decommissioned Mar. 1922 reactivated as guard vessel 1923 decommissioned 1926 sold for breaking up.

==== Nûr-ül Bâhir ====
Name (Namesake)	Builder Dimensions Displacement, Hull Speed Complement	Machinery Boiler, Bunkers Engines Armament	Ordered Laid down Launched Trials	Commissioned Decommissioned Afterward
Nûr-ül Bâhir ("Holy Light of the Sea")	MacLaren & Wilson, Genoa; LPP 52.0m, B 7.8m, D 4.4m 450t, Steel; 12kts (1906) -	Steam, 1 shaft 1, - 2 compound 2 cyl., 300ihp, MacLaren & Wilson; 2x76mm QF (1906)	1897 ordered by Sultan of Morocco as Siri ül Türk; 1898; 1898; Aug. 1898	Sold to the Ottoman government while under construction Dec. 1898 renamed Nûr-ül Bâhir; For Reji İdâresi; 1906 transferred to the Ottoman Navy; 1913 decommissioned.

==== Kastamonu class ====
Name (Namesake)	Builder Dimensions Displacement, Hull Speed Complement	Machinery Boiler, Bunkers Engines Armament	Ordered Laid down Launched Trials	Commissioned Decommissioned Afterward
Kastamonu (Kastamonu)	Gebrüder Sachsenberg, Roßlau Yd No 544; LOA 42.2m, LPP 40.4m, B 5.8m D 1.8m 240t (full road), Steel; 12kts (trial)	Steam, 1 shaft 1 Gebrüder Sachsenberg; 1 triple expansion vertical, 460ihp, Gebrüder Sachsenberg; 1x75mm QF K, 1x37mm QF K	15 Aug. 1904; Oct. 1904; Apr. 1905; Apr. 1905	Jul. 1905; 7 Dec. 1912 sunk by gunfire from Italian cruiser Piemonte and destroyer Artigliere at Konfida (Kunfuda, present day: Al Qunfudhah, Al Bahah Province, Saudi Arabia), Red Sea.
Yozgat (Yozgat)	Gebrüder Sachsenberg, Roßlau Yd No 545; LOA 42.2m, LPP 40.4m, B 5.8m D 1.8m 240t (full road), Steel; 12kts (trial); 3 officers, 9 ratings	Steam, 1 shaft 1 Gebrüder Sachsenberg; 1 triple expansion vertical, 460ihp, Gebrüder Sachsenberg; 1x75mm QF K, 1x37mm QF K	15 Aug. 1904; Oct. 1904; Apr. 1905; Aug. 1905	Oct. 1905; 10 Dec. 1915 sunk by gunfire from Russian Derzky class destroyer Derzky, Gnevny, Bespokoyny at near Kefken Island, Kandıra (Second Battle of Kirpen Island)

==== Marmaris ====
Name (Namesake)	Builder Dimensions Displacement, Hull Speed Complement	Machinery Boiler, Bunkers Engines Armament	Ordered Laid down Launched Trials	Commissioned Decommissioned Afterward
Marmaris (Marmaris)	SA des Ateliers et Chantiers de la Loire, Nantes; LOA 52.4m, LPP 50.0m, B 7.5m, D 2.4m 422t (normal), 531t (full road), Steel; 14.8kts (trial), 11kts (1914); 12 officers, 54 ratings	Steam, 1 shaft 2 cyl., Loire, 75t coal 1 triple expansion vertical, 950ihp, Loire; 4x65mm QF C, 2x37mm QF C, 1xTT 450mm SK (initial), 4x65mm QF C, 2x37mm QF C (1908)	22 Jan. 1906; 1906; Apr. 1907; Nov. 1907	Feb. 1908; 2 Jun. 1915 damaged by gunfire from British gunboat HMS Odin south of Amarah (Tigris), beached.

==== Taşköprü class ====
Name (Namesake)	Builder Dimensions Displacement, Hull Speed Complement	Machinery Boiler, Bunkers Engines Armament	Ordered Laid down Launched Trials	Commissioned Decommissioned Afterward
Taşköprü (Taşköprü)	Schneider & Cie, Chalon-sur-Saône; LOA 47.0m, LPP 45.0m, B 6.2m, D 1.9m 213t, 315t (full road), Steel; 12kts (trial); 9 officers, 38 rating (initial), 10 officers, 42 ratings (1915)	Steam, 1 shaft 1 Scotch, SA des Ateliers et Chantiers de la Loire, 44t coal 1 triple expansion vertical, 480ihp, SA des Ateliers et Chantiers de la Loire; 2x47mm L/50 QF C, 2x7.65mm MG, 1xTT 450mm SK (1908), 1x47mm L/50 QF C, 2x7.65mm MG (1915)	1906; 1907; 1907; 1908	1908; 10 Dec. 1915 sunk by gunfire from Russian Derzky class destroyer Derzky, Gnevny, Bespokoyny at near Kefken Island, Kandıra (Second Battle of Kirpen Island)
Nevşehir (Nevşehir)	Schneider & Cie, Chalon-sur-Saône; LOA 47.0m, LPP 45.0m, B 6.2m, D 1.9m 213t, 315t (full road), Steel; 12kts (trial); 9 officers, 38 rating (initial), 10 officers, 42 ratings (1915)	Steam, 1 shaft 1 Scotch, SA des Ateliers et Chantiers de la Loire, 44t coal 1 triple expansion vertical, 480ihp, SA des Ateliers et Chantiers de la Loire; 2x47mm L/50 QF C, 2x7.65mm MG, 1xTT 450mm SK (1908), 2x47mm L/50 QF C, 2x7.65mm MG (1915)	1906; 1907; 1907; 1908	1908; 30 Jan. 1915 sunk by Ottoman mine near Rumeli Kavağı.
Gökçedağ (Gökçedağ)	Schneider & Cie, Chalon-sur-Saône; LOA 47.0m, LPP 45.0m, B 6.2m, D 1.9m 213t, 315t (full road), Steel; 12kts (trial); 9 officers, 38 rating (initial)	Steam, 1 shaft 1 Scotch, SA des Ateliers et Chantiers de la Loire, 44t coal 1 triple expansion vertical, 480ihp, SA des Ateliers et Chantiers de la Loire; 2x47mm L/50 QF C, 2x7.65mm MG, 1xTT 450mm SK (1908)	1906; 1907; 1907; 1908	1908; 7 Dec. 1912 sunk by gunfire from Italian cruiser Piemonte and destroyer Artigliere at Konfida (Kunfuda, present day: Al Qunfudhah, Al Bahah Province, Saudi Arabia), Red Sea
Refahiye (Refahiye)	Schneider & Cie, Chalon-sur-Saône; LOA 47.0m, LPP 45.0m, B 6.2m, D 1.9m 213t, 315t (full road), Steel; 12kts (trial); 9 officers, 38 rating (initial)	Steam, 1 shaft 1 Scotch, SA des Ateliers et Chantiers de la Loire, 44t coal 1 triple expansion vertical, 480ihp, SA des Ateliers et Chantiers de la Loire; 2x47mm L/50 QF C, 2x7.65mm MG, 1xTT 450mm SK (1908)	1906; 1907; 1907; 1908	1908; 7 Dec. 1912 sunk by gunfire from Italian cruiser Piemonte and destroyer Artigliere at Konfida (Kunfuda, present day: Al Qunfudhah, Al Bahah Province, Saudi Arabia), Red Sea
Ayıntab (Antep)	Schneider & Cie, Chalon-sur-Saône; LOA 47.0m, LPP 45.0m, B 6.2m, D 1.9m 213t, 315t (full road), Steel; 12kts (trial); 9 officers, 38 rating (initial)	Steam, 1 shaft 1 Scotch, SA des Ateliers et Chantiers de la Loire, 44t coal 1 triple expansion vertical, 480ihp, SA des Ateliers et Chantiers de la Loire; 2x47mm L/50 QF C, 2x7.65mm MG, 1xTT 450mm SK (1908)	1906; 1907; 1907; 1907	Jan. 1908; 7 Dec. 1912 sunk by gunfire from Italian cruiser Piemonte and destroyer Artigliere at Konfida (Kunfuda, present day: Al Qunfudhah, Al Bahah Province, Saudi Arabia), Red Sea
Malatya (Malatya)	Schneider & Cie, Chalon-sur-Saône; LOA 47.0m, LPP 45.0m, B 6.2m, D 1.9m 213t, 315t (full road), Steel; 12kts (trial); 9 officers, 38 rating (initial), 10 officers, 42 ratings (1915)	Steam, 1 shaft 1 Scotch, SA des Ateliers et Chantiers de la Loire, 44t coal 1 triple expansion vertical, 480ihp, SA des Ateliers et Chantiers de la Loire; 2x47mm L/50 QF C, 2x7.65mm MG, 1xTT 450mm SK (1908), 1x47mm L/50 QF C, 2x7.65mm MG (1915)	1906; 1907; 1907; 1907	Jan. 1908; 17 Sep. 1916 damaged by Russian mine east of Karaburun, Arnavutköy. 19 Sep. 1916 towed to Constantinople; 1921 sold for breaking up.
Sedd-ül Bahir (Sedd el Bahr)	Schneider & Cie, Chalon-sur-Saône; LOA 47.0m, LPP 45.0m, B 6.2m, D 1.9m 213t, 315t (full road), Steel; 12kts (trial); 9 officers, 38 rating (initial), 10 officers, 42 ratings (1915)	Steam, 1 shaft 1 Scotch, SA des Ateliers et Chantiers de la Loire, 44t coal 1 triple expansion vertical, 480ihp, SA des Ateliers et Chantiers de la Loire; 2x47mm L/50 QF C, 2x7.65mm MG, 1xTT 450mm SK (1908), 1x47mm L/50 QF C, 2x7.65mm MG (1915)	1906; 1907; 1907; 1907	Feb. 1908; Sep. 1909 last mention in Ottoman record.
Ordu (Ordu)	Schneider & Cie, Chalon-sur-Saône; LOA 47.0m, LPP 45.0m, B 6.2m, D 1.9m 213t, 315t (full road), Steel; 12kts (trial); 9 officers, 38 rating (initial)	Steam, 1 shaft 1 Scotch, SA des Ateliers et Chantiers de la Loire, 44t coal 1 triple expansion vertical, 480ihp, SA des Ateliers et Chantiers de la Loire; 2x47mm L/50 QF C, 2x7.65mm MG, 1xTT 450mm SK (1908)	1906; 1907; 1907; 1907	Feb. 1908; 7 Dec. 1912 sunk by gunfire from Italian cruiser Piemonte and destroyer Artigliere at Konfida (Kunfuda, present day: Al Qunfudhah, Al Bahah Province, Saudi Arabia), Red Sea
Bafra (Bafra)	Schneider & Cie, Chalon-sur-Saône; LOA 47.0m, LPP 45.0m, B 6.2m, D 1.9m 213t, 315t (full road), Steel; 12kts (trial); 9 officers, 38 rating (initial)	Steam, 1 shaft 1 Scotch, SA des Ateliers et Chantiers de la Loire, 44t coal 1 triple expansion vertical, 480ihp, SA des Ateliers et Chantiers de la Loire; 2x47mm L/50 QF C, 2x7.65mm MG, 1xTT 450mm SK (1908)	1906; 1907; 1907; 1907	Jan. 1908; 7 Dec. 1912 sunk by gunfire from Italian cruiser Piemonte and destroyer Artigliere at Konfida (Kunfuda, present day: Al Qunfudhah, Al Bahah Province, Saudi Arabia), Red Sea

==== Aydın Reis class ====
Name (Namesake)	Builder Dimensions Displacement, Hull Speed Complement	Machinery Boiler, Bunkers Engines Armament	Ordered Laid down Launched Trials	Commissioned Decommissioned Afterward
Aydın Reis (Aydın Reis)	SA des Chantiers & Ateliers de St. Nazaire, Penhöet; LOA 54.5m, B 8.2m, D 2.4m 503t, Steel; 14kts (trial), 10kts (1915); 14 officers, 61 ratings	Steam, 2 shafts 3 Scotch, Chantiers & Ateliers de St. Nazaire, - 2 triple expansion vertical, 1025ihp, Chantiers & Ateliers de St. Nazaire; 2x100mm QF C, 2x47mm QF C, 2x7.6mm MG H (1914), 2x76mm QF K (1919), 2x47mm AF C (1924), disarmed (1930)	Apr. 1911; 1911; Jun. 1912; 1912	Jun. 1914; Feb. 1919 anti-smuggling duty, Black Sea; 16 Sep. 1920 left Samsun for Novorossiysk, interned 16 May 1921 returned to Turkish nationalists 1925 sea cadet training vessel 1926 survey vessel 1949 decommissioned 1954 sold for breaking up.
Preveze (Preveza)	SA des Chantiers & Ateliers de St. Nazaire, Penhöet; LOA 54.5m, B 8.2m, D 2.4m 503t, Steel; 14kts (trial), 10kts (1915); 14 officers, 61 ratings	Steam, 2 shafts 3 Scotch, Chantiers & Ateliers de St. Nazaire, - 2 triple expansion vertical, 1025ihp, Chantiers & Ateliers de St. Nazaire; 2x100mm QF C, 2x47mm QF C, 2x7.6mm MG H (1914), 2x76mm QF K (1919), 2x47mm AF C (1924), disarmed (1930)	Apr. 1911; 1911; Jan. 1912; 1912	Jun. 1914; Feb. 1919 anti-smuggling duty, Black Sea; 30 Sep. 1920 left Trabzon for Novorossiysk, interned 16 May 1921 returned to Turkish nationalists 1926 decommissioned.
Sakız (Chios)	SA des Chantiers & Ateliers de St. Nazaire, Penhöet; LOA 54.5m, B 8.2m, D 2.4m 503t, Steel; 14kts (trial), 10kts (1915); 14 officers, 61 ratings	Steam, 2 shafts 3 Scotch, Chantiers & Ateliers de St. Nazaire, - 2 triple expansion vertical, 1025ihp, Chantiers & Ateliers de St. Nazaire; 2x100mm QF C, 2x47mm QF C, 2x7.6mm MG H (1914), disarmed (1919)	Apr. 1911; 1911; 1912; 1912	Jun. 1914; 23 Oct. 1918 interned at Constantinople; 1924 returned to service 1930 stationary HQ ship for submarines at Gölcük; 1935 decommissioned sold for breaking up.
Burak Reis (Burak Reis)	SA des Chantiers & Ateliers de St. Nazaire, Penhöet; LOA 54.5m, B 8.2m, D 2.4m 503t, Steel; 14kts (trial), 10kts (1915); 14 officers, 61 ratings	Steam, 2 shafts 3 Scotch, Chantiers & Ateliers de St. Nazaire, - 2 triple expansion vertical, 1025ihp, Chantiers & Ateliers de St. Nazaire; 2x100mm QF C, 2x47mm QF C, 2x7.6mm MG H (1914), disarmed (1919)	Apr. 1911; 1911; May 1912; 1912	Jun. 1914; 23 Oct. 1918 interned at Constantinople; 1924 returned to service 1932 survey vessel 1953 capsized at Heybeliada; 1955 sold for breaking up.

==== Îsâ Reis class ====
Name (Namesake)	Builder Dimensions Displacement, Hull Speed Complement	Machinery Boiler, Bunkers Engines Armament	Ordered Laid down Launched Trials	Commissioned Decommissioned Afterward
Îsâ Reis (Isa Reis)	SA des Forges & Chantiers de la Méditerranée, Granville; LOA 47.0, B 7.9m, D 1.3m 413t, Steel/Wood; 12 officers, 48 ratings	Steam, 2 shafts 3 Scotch, Forges & Chantiers de la Méditerranée, Granville, - 2 triple expansion vertical, 850ihp, Forges & Chantiers de la Méditerranée, Granville; 3x76mm QF C, 2x47mm QF C, 2x7.6mm MG H (1914), 2x76mm QF C, 2x47mm QF C (1926), disarmed (1948)	Apr. 1911; 1911; Nov. 1911; 1912	Jun. 1914; 1915 damaged by Russian mine off Bosporus; 1915-24 laid up at Constantinople; 1924-26 at refitted by Gölcük Shipyard; 1926 customs vessel 1932 mine sweeper 1948 survey vessel 1955 decommissioned 1964 broken up at Seyman.
Durak Reis/Kemal Reis (Durak Reis)	SA des Forges & Chantiers de la Méditerranée, Granville; LOA 47.0, B 7.9m, D 1.3m 413t, Steel/Wood; 12 officers, 48 ratings	Steam, 2 shafts 3 Scotch, Forges & Chantiers de la Méditerranée, Granville, - 2 triple expansion vertical, 850ihp, Forges & Chantiers de la Méditerranée, Granville; 3x76mm QF C, 2x47mm QF C, 2x7.6mm MG H (1914), 2x76mm QF C, 2x47mm QF C (1926), disarmed (1948)	Apr. 1911; 1911; Nov. 1911; 1912	Jun. 1914; 16 Jan. 1916 renamed Kemal Reis; 23 Oct. 1918 interned at Constantinople; 1924-26 refitted by Gölcük Shipyard; 1926 customs vessel 1932 mine sweeper 1964 sold to MKE Seyman, for breaking up 1973 broken up.
Hızır Reis (Hızır Reis)	SA des Forges & Chantiers de la Méditerranée, Granville; LOA 47.0, B 7.9m, D 1.3m 413t, Steel/Wood; 12 officers, 48 ratings	Steam, 2 shafts 3 Scotch, Forges & Chantiers de la Méditerranée, Granville, - 2 triple expansion vertical, 850ihp, Forges & Chantiers de la Méditerranée, Granville; 3x76mm QF C, 2x47mm QF C, 2x7.6mm MG H (1914), 2x76mm QF C, 2x47mm QF C (1926), disarmed (1948)	Apr. 1911; 1911; 10 Apr. 1912; Jun. 1912	Jun. 1914; 21 Jan. 1915 damaged by Ottoman mine near Rumeli Kavağı; 1916 returned to service 6 Jul. 1919 seized by Greeks at Smyrna; 1922 returned to Turkish nationalists 1932 mine sweeper 1948 stationary pilot vessel at İzmir; 1952 decommissioned 1958 sold, general cargo motorship renamed Emin; 1981 renamed Murat Ayanoğlu; 1982 renamed Kaptan Cavit; 1995 renamed Miktat Kalkavan

=== River Gunboat (Nehir Gambotu) ===
==== Doğan ====
Name (Namesake)	Builder Dimensions Displacement, Hull Speed Complement	Machinery Boiler, Bunkers Engines Armament	Ordered Laid down Launched Trials	Commissioned Decommissioned Afterward
Doğan ("Falcon")	Gebr. Wiemann, Brandenburg Yd No 140; LOA 35.5m, LPP 34.8m, B 6.3m, D 1.6m 250t, Steel; 6.5kts (1915); 30 Ottomans, 5 Germans (1915), 42 (1916)	Steam, 1 shaft 1 water tube, A Borsing, - 1 triple expansion vertical, 350ihp, Wiemann; 1x60mm QF, 4x47mm QF, 1x37mm QF (1915), 1x60mm QF, 1x57mm QF, 2x47mm QF, 1x37mm QF, 1xMG (1916)	1911; Apr. 1911; Apr. 1911; Apr. 1911	17 Sep. 1912 Pionier R Wönkhaus, Hamburgbr />1913 based at Baghdad as river tug May 1915 chartered by Ottoman Navy; 17–29 Jun. 1915 refitted by Bağadat Demiryolu İnşaat; 2 Jul. 1915 commissioned 26 Feb. 1917 damaged by gunfire from British gunboat Mantis near Al Aziziyah (present day in Wasit Governorate), run ground.

==== Selmân-ı Pâk ====
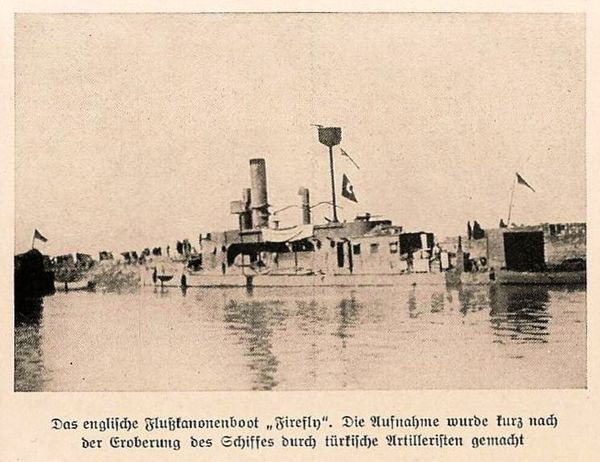
Selmân-ı Pâk (HM Gunboat Firefly)

Name (Namesake)	Builder Dimensions Displacement Speed Complement	Machinery Armament	Notes
Selmân-ı Pâk (Salman Pak)	Yarrow & Co., Scotstown; 38.4 m (126 ft) overall, 6.1 m (20 ft) beam, draught 0.6m 98 tons, 10 knots 1 officer, 25 ratings (1916)	single boiler with single 175 ihp triple expansion engine driving a single shaft 5 t coal and 10 t oil QF 4-inch (102 mm) gun, 1x 12-pounder (76 mm) QF, 1x 6-pounder (57mm) QF, 3xMG (1915), 1x76mm QF, 1x75mm QF, 1x57mm, 3xMG (1916)	HM Gunboat Firefly captured by Ottoman Army near Elhan on 1 December 1915 and commissioned as Selmân-ı Pâk on 12 December. Retaken on 26 February 1917 by the British gunboat Tarantula near Al Aziziyah in the Battle of Nahr-al-Kalek. Sunk on 14 June 1924 on the Euphrates.

== Aviso (Avizo) ==
=== Talia ===
Name (Namesake)	Builder Dimensions Displacement, Hull Speed Complement	Machinery Boiler, Bunkers Engines Armament	Ordered Laid down Launched Trials	Commissioned Decommissioned Afterward
Talia	Samuda Bros., London; LPP 76.2m, B 9.1m, D 3.6m 1058t, Wood; 17.7kts (trial); 130	Steam, side paddle 2, 120t coal 1-2 cyl., 200ihp, J. Penn; 4x11pdr (1864), 3x90mm K, 2x37mm K (1880), 4x57mm QF, 2x25.4mm H (1895)	1863; 1863; 1863; Jan. 1864	Mar. 1864; 1899; Nov. 1909 sold for breaking up.

=== İzzeddin ===
Name (Namesake)	Builder Dimensions Displacement, Hull Speed Complement	Machinery Boiler, Bunkers Engines Armament	Ordered Laid down Launched Trials	Commissioned Decommissioned Afterward
İzzeddin	Thames Iron Works, London; LPP 76.2m, B 9.1m, D 3.6m 1058t, Wood; 17.7kts (trial); 130	Steam, side paddle 2, 150t coal 1-2 cyl., 200ihp, J. Penn; 4x11pdr (1865), 1x120mm K, 3x76mm K (1874), 2x76mm K, 1x37mm QF K (1902), Disarmed (1908)	1864; 1864; 1864; 1865	1865; 1908 stationary work ship at Smyrna; 14 Jan. 1914 towed to Constantinople; Sep. 1914 stationary work ship at İstinye; Oct. 1918 decommissioned 1929 broken up.

=== Fuad ===
Name (Namesake)	Builder Dimensions Displacement, Hull Speed Complement	Machinery Boiler, Bunkers Engines Armament	Ordered Laid down Launched Trials	Commissioned Decommissioned Afterward
Fuad	Millwall Iron Works, London; LPP 76.2m, B 9.1m, D 3.6m 1075t, Iron; 17.7kts (trial); 130	Steam, side paddle 2, 150t coal 1-compound 2 cyl., 200ihp, Ravenhill; 4x11pdr (1865), 2x80mm, 2x57mm (1880), 2x75mm QF K, 2x25.4mm H (1890)	1864; 1864; 27 Apr. 1865; 1865	1865; 1908 stationary at Salonika; 5 Nov. 1912 stationary hospital vessel at Salonika; 15 Nov. 1912 seized by Greek government 1912 Royal Greek Navy Fuad; 1919 out of service 1921 broken up.

=== İsmail ===
Name (Namesake)	Builder Dimensions Displacement, Hull Speed Complement	Machinery Boiler, Bunkers Engines Armament	Ordered Laid down Launched Trials	Commissioned Decommissioned Afterward
İsmail	-, London; LPP 76.2m, B 9.1m, D 3.6m 1070t, Wood; 12.7kts (trial), 10kts (1880); 135	Steam, side paddle 2, 250t coal 1-2 cyl., 300ihp, Napier; 4x11pdr (1865), 3x90mm, 2x37mm (1880), 4x76mm QF K, 2x37mm (1891)	1864; 1865; 1865; 1865	1865; 1898; Oct. 1909 sold for breaking up.

=== Hanya ===
Name (Namesake)	Builder Dimensions Displacement, Hull Speed Complement	Machinery Boiler, Bunkers Engines Armament	Ordered Laid down Launched Trials	Commissioned Decommissioned Afterward
Hanya	J & W Dudgeson, London; L 70.1m, B 8.2m, D 1.9m 816t, Iron; 10 kts (1868); 105	Steam, side paddle 2, 120t coal 1 cyl. 1x20pdr A (1868), 3x47mm H (1880), Disarmed (1900)	1863; 1863; 1863; 1863	1863 Confederate Navy Run Her; 1863 laid up at London; 1866 sold to Ottoman government 1866 commissioned as Hanya; 1904 decommissioned Sep. 1909 sold for breaking up.

=== Kandiya ===
Name (Namesake)	Builder Dimensions Displacement, Hull Speed Complement	Machinery Boiler, Bunkers Engines Armament	Ordered Laid down Launched Trials	Commissioned Decommissioned Afterward
Kandiya	-, L 73.0m, B 8.8m, D 2.0m 820t, Iron; 10kts (1867) -	Steam, side paddle -, 120t coal - 6x30pdr (1867), 3x57mm QF, 3x24.5mm (1888), Disarmed (1897)	- 1865; 1865; 1865	Confederate Navy; 1865 laid up 1867 sold to Ottoman government 1867 commissioned 1882 stationary at Beirut; Apr. 1896 returned to Constantinople, laid up 1899 stricken.

=== Arkadi ===
Name (Namesake)	Builder Dimensions Displacement, Hull Speed Complement	Machinery Boiler, Bunkers Engines Armament	Ordered Laid down Launched Trials	Commissioned Decommissioned Afterward
Arkadi	W. Potter & Son., London; L 78.0m, B 8.0m, D 2.0m 767t, 150t coal 13kts (1867), 10kts (1877); 120	Steam, side paddle -, 150t coal - 6x30pdr (1867), 2x76mm QF, 1x60mm (1884)	1865; 1866; 1866 -	1866 Confederate Navy Dream; 1867 sold to Greek government 1867 Royal Hellenic Navy blockade-runner Arkadion (after the Arkadi Monastery); 20 Aug. 1867 driven ashore by Ottoman sloop İzzeddin commanded by Augustus Charles Hobart-Hampden north of Elafonisos; Sep. 1867 floated and commissioned as Arkadi; 1896 decommissioned 1905 sold for breaking up.

=== Resmo ===
Name (Namesake)	Builder Dimensions Displacement, Hull Speed Complement	Machinery Boiler, Bunkers Engines Armament	Ordered Laid down Launched Trials	Commissioned Decommissioned Afterward
Resmo	-, L 69.8m, B 7.9m, D 2.1m 765t, Iron; 14kts (1868), 10kts (1877); 150 (1868), 80 (1880)	Steam, side paddle 1 rectangular, 150t coal 1-2cyl., 270ihp 1x40pdr A, 1x20pdr A (1870), 3x67mm QF (1887), 2x37mm QF (1896)	1862; 1862; 1862; 1862	1868 sold to Ottoman government 1868 commissioned as Resmo; 1894 laid up 1897 returned to service 1905 decommissioned 1909 sold for breaking up.

=== Eser-i Nusret class ===
Name (Namesake)	Builder Dimensions Displacement, Hull Speed Complement	Machinery Boiler, Bunkers Engines Armament	Ordered Laid down Launched Trials	Commissioned Decommissioned Afterward
Eser-i Nusret	Jones Quiggin, Liverpool; LPP 87.8m, B 10.8m, D 4.5m 1343t BM, Iron; 13kts (1869); 120	Steam, side paddle 2, 150t coal 1; 2x40pdr A, 2x12pdr A (1869), 4x47mm QF (1880)	1864; 1865; 1865; 1865	1865 Confederate Navy Rosina; 1865 laid up at Liverpool; 1869 sold to Ottoman government 1869 commissioned as Eser-i Nusret; 1890 decommissioned.
Medar-i Zafer	Jones Quiggin, Liverpool; LPP 87.8m, B 10.8m, D 4.5m 1343t BM, Iron; 13kts (1869); 120	Steam, side paddle 2, 150t coal 1; 2x40pdr A, 2x12pdr A (1869), 4x47mm QF (1880)	1864; 1865; 1865; 1865	1865 Confederate Navy Ruby; 1865 laid up at Liverpool; 1869 sold to Ottoman government 1869 commissioned as Medar-i Zafer; 1890 decommissioned.

=== Taif class ===
Name (Namesake)	Builder Dimensions Displacement, Hull Speed Complement	Machinery Boiler, Bunkers Engines Armament	Ordered Laid down Launched Trials	Commissioned Decommissioned Afterward
Taif	Tersâne-i Âmire, Istanbul, Constantinople; L 76.6m, B 11.0m, D 5.1m 1609t BM, Wood; 12 kts (trial), 8kts (1875); 250	Steam, side paddle 2 box, Tersâne-i Âmire, - 4x126mm ML (1875)	1869; 1869; 29 Jan. 1870; 1871	1872; 1894; 1898 sold for breaking up.
Asır	Tersâne-i Âmire, Istanbul, Constantinople; L 76.6m, B 11.0m, D 5.1m 1609t BM, Wood; 12 kts (trial), 8kts (1875); 250	Steam, side paddle 2 box, Tersâne-i Âmire, - 4x126mm ML (1875)	1869; 1871; 1875; 1876	1875 towed to Constantinople to fit machinery 1876 commissioned 1894 decommissioned 1898 sold for breaking up.

=== Galata ===
Name (Namesake)	Builder Dimensions Displacement, Hull Speed Complement	Machinery Boiler, Bunkers Engines Armament	Ordered Laid down Launched Trials	Commissioned Decommissioned Afterward
Galata	Day, Summers & Co., Southampton, Yd No. 109; LOA 40.0m, LPP 33.7m, B 4.9m, D 2.4m 120t, Steel; 12kts (1911); 24 (1911)	Steam, 1 shaft 1, - 1 triple expansion 3 cyl., Day, Summers; 1x63mm QF, 2xMG (1911), Disarmed (1914)	1895; 1896; 1896; 1896	1896 Lobelia; 1900s Amalie; 1910 sold to Ottoman government 1910 commissioned as Galata; 1930 decommissioned.

== Yacht (Yat) ==
=== Sultaniye ===
Name (Namesake)	Builder Dimensions Displacement, Hull Speed Complement	Machinery Boiler, Bunkers Engines Armament	Ordered Laid down Launched Trials	Commissioned Decommissioned Afterward
Sultaniye	C. J. Mare, Blackwall, London; LPP 119.2m, B 12.2m, D 9.0m, D 4.8m 2909t BM, 3095t, Wood; 140	Steam, side paddle 2, 300t coal 1-2cyl., 750ihp, Maudslay; 4x14pdr (1890), 2x120mm K, 2x37mm (1890), 2 RV (1896)	1851; 1852; 23 Dec. 1852; 1853	1853 Egyiptian Navy Feyz-i Cihat; 1862 rebuilt by Forrester & Co. 1862 presented by Ismail Pasha to Abdulaziz; 1862 commissioned as Sultâniye; 1905 laid up at Smyrna; Oct. 1911 loaded with stone and made ready to scuttle off Yenikale, Smyrna.

=== Süreyya ===
Name (Namesake)	Builder Dimensions Displacement, Hull Speed Complement	Machinery Boiler, Bunkers Engines Armament	Ordered Laid down Launched Trials	Commissioned Decommissioned Afterward
Süreyya	Samuda Bros., London; LPP 56.1m, B 8.5m, D 2.1; 672t BM, Iron; 14kts (trial); 90	Steam, side paddle 4, 120t coal 2-2cyl., 610ihp, J. Penn; 2x11pdr, 2x8pdr (1865), 2x57mmQF (1880)	1864; 1865; 1865; 1865	1865; 1890-92 refitted by Tersâne-i Âmire; 1899 stationary for the Vali of Aydın Province; 1908 decommissioned 1921 sold for breaking up.

=== Şerifiye / Beylerbeyi ===
Name (Namesake)	Builder Dimensions Displacement, Hull Speed Complement	Machinery Boiler, Bunkers Engines Armament	Ordered Laid down Launched Trials	Commissioned Decommissioned Afterward
Şerifiye	-, L 29.3m, B 4.6m, D 2.5m 96t, Wood; 12kts (trial) -	Screw, 1 shaft 1, 20t 1 Unarmed	1873; 1873; 1873; 1873	1873; 1893 renamed Beylerbeyi; 1909 decommissioned 11 Nov. 1910 sold for breaking up.

=== Şerifiye ===
Name (Namesake)	Builder Dimensions Displacement, Hull Speed Complement	Machinery Boiler, Bunkers Engines Armament	Ordered Laid down Launched Trials	Commissioned Decommissioned Afterward
Şerifiye / Beylerbeyi	-, Constantza; L 28.5m, B 3.2m, D 1.9m 55t, Wood; 15kts (1893) -	Steam, 1 shaft 1, - 1 compound 2 cyl. Unarmed	1892; 1892; 1892; 1892	1893; 1909; Jan. 1909 sold for breaking up.

=== Ertuğrul ===
Name (Namesake)	Builder Dimensions Displacement, Hull Speed Complement	Machinery Boiler, Bunkers Engines Armament	Ordered Laid down Launched Trials	Commissioned Decommissioned Afterward
Ertuğrul	Armstrong, Mitchell & Co., Newcastle-upon-Tyne; L 79.2m, B 8.3m, D 3.5m 900t, Steel; 21kts (trial) -	Steam, 2 shafts 2, Armstrong, Mitchell, - 2 triple expansion 3 cyl., 2500ihp, Hawthorn Leslie; 8x47 QF A (1904)	1903; 1903; 30 Dec. 1903; 1904	1904; 1919 laid up at Constantinople; 1924 president yacht 1937 decommissioned 1939 sold for breakin up to İlhami Söker; 1960/61 broken up.

=== Söğütlü ===
Name (Namesake)	Builder Dimensions Displacement, Hull Speed Complement	Machinery Boiler, Bunkers Engines Armament	Ordered Laid down Launched Trials	Commissioned Decommissioned Afterward
Söğütlü	Armstrong, Mitchell & Co., Newcastle-upon-Tyne; L -, B -, D - 120gt, 8 nt, Steel; 14kts (1908) -	Steam, 1 shaft 1, - 1 compound, 2 cyl., 250ihp Unarmed	1907; 1908; 1908; 1908	1908; 1923 prime ministerial yacht 1933 decommissioned 1933 despatch vessel for Ministry of Sea Transport; 1938 merchant-marine training ship 1944 laid up at Istanbul.

=== Şipka (armed yacht) ===
Name (Namesake)	Builder Dimensions Displacement, Hull Speed Complement	Machinery Boiler, Bunkers Engines Armament	Ordered Laid down Launched Trials	Commissioned Decommissioned Afterward
Şipka	Ramage & Ferguson, Leith; L 57.8m, B 6.9m D 3.7m 420t, Steel; 12kts (1911) -	Steam, 1 shaft 2, - 1 triple expansion 3 cyl., 1150ihp, Ramage & Ferguson; 1x57mm QF, 2x37mm QF (1911)	1891; 1892; May 1892; 1892	1892 Fauvette E. A. Perignon, Marseille; May 1911 sold to Ottoman government commissioned as Şipka; 7 Jan. 1912 scuttled by crew at Konfida; 8 Jan. 1912 raised by Italians; Jan. 1912 Regia Marina Cunfida; 13 Nov. 1924 decommissioned.

=== Trablus (armed yacht) ===
Name (Namesake)	Builder Dimensions Displacement, Hull Speed Complement	Machinery Boiler, Bunkers Engines Armament	Ordered Laid down Launched Trials	Commissioned Decommissioned Afterward
Trablus	Murray Bros., Dumbarton; LPP 59.0m, B 7.7m, D 3.6m 629t, 705t (full road), Iron; 10kts (1911) -	Steam, 1 shaft 1, - 2 compound 2 cyl., 335ihp, Mair & Houston; 1x57mm QF, 2x37 QF (1911)	1886; 1887; Jul. 1887; Sep. 1887	1887 Thetis John Donaldson, London; May 1911 sold to Ottoman government Jul. 1911 commissioned as Trablus; 30 Sep. 1911 scuttled by crew at Reşadiye; Nov. 1911 raised by Italians; 19 Nov. 1911 Regia Marina Capitano Verri; 19 Dec. 1926 decommissioned.

== Survey vessel (Mesaha gemisi) ==
=== Beyrut ===
Name (Namesake)	Builder Dimensions Displacement, Hull Speed Complement	Machinery Boiler, Bunkers Engines Armament	Ordered Laid down Launched Trials	Commissioned Decommissioned Afterward
Beyrut	Ramage & Ferguson, Leith; L 51.9m, B 6.9m, D 4.4m 411t, Steel - -	Steam, 1 shaft 1, - 1 triple expansion 3 cyl., Ramage & Ferguson; 2x57mm QF, 2x37 QF (1911)	1898; 1899; 1899; 1899	1899 Lady Gipsy Thomas Pink, London; May 1911 sold to Ottoman government Sep. 1911 sommissioned as Beyerut; 1 Nov. 1914 sunk by gunfire from British HMS Wolverine and HMS Scorpion at Urla.

== Q-ship ==
=== Dere ===
Name (Namesake)	Builder Dimensions Displacement, Hull Speed Complement	Machinery Boiler, Bunkers Engines Armament	Ordered Laid down Launched Trials	Commissioned Decommissioned Afterward
Dere	- - -, Wood - 1 officer, 6 ratings, 4 ratings for gun (from Hamidiye)	None, 2 mast -, -	- - - -	23 Jun. 1915; 24 Jun. 1915 action with a Russian submarine off Kefken Island; 4-5 shells fired Anchored at Kefken; 27 Jun. 1915 towed by tug to Constantinople; 29 Jun. 1915 decommissioned

== Guard vessel (Karakol gemisi) ==
=== Nûr-ül Bâhir ===
Name (Namesake)	Builder Dimensions Displacement, Hull Speed Complement	Machinery Boiler, Bunkers Engines Armament	Ordered Laid down Launched Trials	Commissioned Decommissioned Afterward
Nûr-ül Bâhir	Gourlay Bros. & Co., Dundee, Yd No 158; LPP 45.7m, B 7.0m, D 3.5; 295gt, Steel; 12kts (1903) -	Steam, 1 shaft 1, Gourlay Bros., - 1 triple expansion 3 cyl., 350ihp, Gourlay Bros. 1 Gardner QF (1894), 1x47mm QF, 1x37mm QF (1903)	1893; 1893; Nov. 1893; Dec. 1893	Jan 1894 Osmanlı Reji İdâresi; 1903 transferred to Ottoman Navy; 1913 decommissioned

=== Rüsumat No 1 ===
Name (Namesake)	Builder Dimensions Displacement, Hull Speed Complement	Machinery Boiler, Bunkers Engines Armament	Ordered Laid down Launched Trials	Commissioned Decommissioned Afterward
Rüsumat No 1	J. T. Eltringham & Co., South Shields, Yd No 231; L 30.5m, B 6.1m, D 3.1m 143gt, 43nt, 200t, Steel; 9kts (1914); 3 officers, 16 ratings	Steam, 1 shaft 1 Scotch, J. T. Eltringham, - 1 triple expansion 3 cyl., G. T. Gray; 2x37mm QF (1914)	1901; 1901; 1901; 1901	1901 New Century J. T. Eltringham & Co., South Shields; 1913 Rüsumat No 1 Gümrük Dairesi, Constantinople; Aug. 1914 transferred to Ottoman Navy; Aug. 1914 minesweeper Apr. 1915 guard ship Feb. 1918 transporter Oct. 1918 decommissioned 1924 transferred to Turkish Custom Service; 1929 out of service

=== Rüsumat No 2 ===
Name (Namesake)	Builder Dimensions Displacement, Hull Speed Complement	Machinery Boiler, Bunkers Engines Armament	Ordered Laid down Launched Trials	Commissioned Decommissioned Afterward
Rüsumat No 2	-, - - 120t, Steel; 6kts (1915); 1 officer, 15 ratings (1914)	Steam, 1 shaft 1, - 1 triple expansion 3 cyl. 2x47mm QF (1914)	- - - -	British trawler 1913 Rüsumat No 2 Gümrük Dairesi, Constantinople; Aug. 1914 transferred to Ottoman Navy; Aug. 1914 minesweeper Apr. 1915 guard ship Oct. 1918 decommissioned 1924 sold, converted to cargo vessel 1924 İnayet Hacı Eşref; 1926 burnt and lost at Karadeniz Ereğli.

=== Rüsumat No 3 ===
Name (Namesake)	Builder Dimensions Displacement, Hull Speed Complement	Machinery Boiler, Bunkers Engines Armament	Ordered Laid down Launched Trials	Commissioned Decommissioned Afterward
Rüsumat No 3	J. T. Eltringham & Co., South Shields, Yd No 232; L 30.5m, B 6.1m, D 3.1m 143gt, 43nt, 200t, Steel; 9kts (1914); 3 officers, 16 ratings	Steam, 1 shaft 1 Scotch, J. T. Eltringham, - 1 triple expansion 3 cyl., G. T. Gray; 2x37mm QF (1914)	1901; 1901; 1901; 1901	1901 New Enterprise, R. Irvin & Sons., North Shield; 1913 Rüsumat No 3 Gümrük Dairesi; Aug. 1914 transferred to Ottoman Navy; Aug. 1914 minesweeper Apr. 1915 guard ship 18 May 1916 collier Oct. 1918 decommissioned 1923 sold and converted to cargo vessel 1924 Feyyaz Refik Bey, Constantinople; 1930 Feyyaz Ahmet Kemalettin, Istanbul; 1933 Feyyaz Sosyete Vapurculuk, Istanbul; 1935 Feyyaz L. Ayral, Istanbul; 1958 broken up.

=== Rüsumat No 4 ===
Name (Namesake)	Builder Dimensions Displacement, Hull Speed Complement	Machinery Boiler, Bunkers Engines Armament	Ordered Laid down Launched Trials	Commissioned Decommissioned Afterward
Rüsumat No 4	-, - LPP 29.8m, B 8.6m, D 3.2; 310t, Steel; 5 officers, 16 ratings (1915)	Steam, 1 shaft 1, - - 2x37mm (1914)	1891; 1891; 1891; 1891	British trawler 1913 Rüsumat No 4 Gümrük Dairesi, Constantinople; Aug. 1914 transferred to Ottoman Navy; Aug. 1914 minesweeper Apr. 1915 guard ship Nov. 1918 laid up at Karadeniz Ereğli; 10 June 1919 joined nationalist forces 30 Sep. 1921 beached off Görele after gunfire from Greek warships 14 Oct. 1921 destroyed by gunfire from Greek warships

=== Rüsumat No 5 ===
Name (Namesake)	Builder Dimensions Displacement, Hull Speed Complement	Machinery Boiler, Bunkers Engines Armament	Ordered Laid down Launched Trials	Commissioned Decommissioned Afterward
Rüsumat No 5	Hall, Russell & Co., Glasgow, Yd No 328; L 31.8m, B 6.1m, D 3.3m 155gt, 61nt, 200t, Steel; 4kts (1915); 1 officer, 15 ratings (1915)	Steam, 1 shaft 1 Scotch, Hall, Russell; 1 triple expansion 3 cyl., Hall, Russell; 2x37mm QF (1914), Disarmed (Jan. 1915)	1900; 1900; 1900; 1900	1900 Ivernia Irvin Steam Fishing Co., North Shields; 1913 Rüsumat No 5 Gümrük Dairesi, Constantinopel; Aug. 1914 transferred to Ottoman Navy; Sep. 1914 minesweeper Jan. 1915 sent to Karadeniz Ereğli, disarmed 5 May 1915 sunk by Russian destroyers at Karadeniz Ereğli

=== Aydın ===
Name (Namesake)	Builder Dimensions Displacement, Hull Speed Complement	Machinery Boiler, Bunkers Engines Armament	Ordered Laid down Launched Trials	Commissioned Decommissioned Afterward
Aydın	SA Stabilimento Tecnico Triestino, Trieste, Yd No 264; LOA 31.7m, LPP 29.8m, B4.2m, D 1.9m 75gt, 35nt, 210t, Steel; 8kts (1915); 3 officers, 17 ratings	Steam, 1 shaft 1, Stabilimente Technico, Trieste, 25t coal 1 compound 2 cyl., 200ihp, Stabilimente Technico, Trieste; 1x47mm QF (1915)	1890; 1890; 1890; 1890	1890 Aydın Osmanlı Reji İdaresi; Apr. 1915 transferred to Ottoman Navy; Oct. 1918 decommissioned

=== Bahr-i Sefid ===
Name (Namesake)	Builder Dimensions Displacement, Hull Speed Complement	Machinery Boiler, Bunkers Engines Armament	Ordered Laid down Launched Trials	Commissioned Decommissioned Afterward
Bahr-i Sefid	Tersâne-i Âmire, Istanbul, Constantinople; LPP 38.6m, B 5.4m, D 1.9m 210t, Steel; 6kts (1915); 4 officers, 17 ratings	Steam, 1 shaft 1 double ended, Tersâne-i Âmire; 1 triple expansion, 400ihp, Tersâne-i Âmire; 1x47mm QF, 1x37mm QF (1915)	Oct. 1890 as Nusr-i Hüdâ class gunboat 1901; 1903; 1905	1905 transferred to Osmanlı Reji İdaresi; Apr. 1915 transferred to Ottoman Navy; Oct. 1918 decommissioned

=== İskenderun ===
Name (Namesake)	Builder Dimensions Displacement, Hull Speed Complement	Machinery Boiler, Bunkers Engines Armament	Ordered Laid down Launched Trials	Commissioned Decommissioned Afterward
İskenderun	J. Fullerton & Co., Paisley; L 35.2, B 5.8m, D 3.4m 142gt, 30nt, Steel; 5kts (1915); 2 officers, 6 ratings, 8 civilians (1915)	Steam, 1 shaft 1, - 1 compound 2cyl., Ross & Duncan; 1x37mm QF (Apr. 1915), 2x47mm QF (Sep. 1915)	1894; 1895; 1895; 1895	May 1896 İskenderun Osmanlı Reji İdaresi, Constantinople; Apr. 1915 transferred to Ottoman Navy; Oct. 1918 decommissioned Mar. 1919 returned to Osmanlı Reji İdaresi; 1923 sold and converted to cargo vessel 1923 Mudanya Cemal Bey, Constantinople; 1924 Mudanya Zafer; 1927 converted to motorship 1927 Sürat Kocaeli Nakliyat Şirketi; 1 Jan. 1933 Sürat Sosyete Vapurculuk, Istanbul; 1934 Sürat Bekir Aslanö Mehmet Mete, Istanbul; 1938 Tuna İlyas Tuna, Istanbul; 1964 broken up

=== Sakız ===
Name (Namesake)	Builder Dimensions Displacement, Hull Speed Complement	Machinery Boiler, Bunkers Engines Armament	Ordered Laid down Launched Trials	Commissioned Decommissioned Afterward
Sakız	J. Fullerton & Co., Paisley; L 35.2m, B 5.8m, D 3.4m 142gt, 30mnt, Steel; 5kts (1915); 2 officers, 6 ratings, 8 civilians (1915)	Steam, 1 shaft 1, - 1 compound 2 cyl., Ross & Duncan; 1x37mm QF (Apr. 1915)	1894; 1895; 1895; 1895	May 1895 Sakız Osmanlı Reji İdaresi, Constantinople; Apr. 1915 transferred to Ottoman Navy; 20 Aug. 1915 sunk by British submarine HMS E2 at Erdek
