= Directorate of National Palaces =

Agency of the Turkish government

- Millî Saraylar İdaresi Başkanlığı

Agency overview
- Headquarters: Dolmabahçe Palace, Istanbul
- Agency executive: Dr. Yasin Yıldız, President
- Parent department: Office of the President of Turkey
- Website: www.millisaraylar.gov.tr

In Turkey, the Directorate of National Palaces (Turkish: Millî Saraylar İdaresi Başkanlığı) is an institution responsible for protecting national palaces across the country. It is affiliated with the office of the President of Turkey.

== History ==
Four months after the declaration of the Republic of Turkey, with the Law No. 431 enacted on 3 March 1924, the Caliphate was abolished, and the sultan's palaces and all its properties and furnishings were transferred to the nation according to Articles 8, 9 and 10 of this law.

With the Council of Ministers' decree on 18 January 1925, Dolmabahçe and Beylerbeyi Palaces were named among the National Palaces and left to the management of the National Palaces Managing Organization. In the same year, Yıldız-Şale, Aynalıkavak and Küçüksu Palace came under the control of this Directorate, followed by Yalova Atatürk Mansion in 1930, Ihlamur Palace in 1966 and Maslak Palace in 1981. With the Organization Law of the General Secretariat of the Turkish Grand National Assembly numbered 2919, the organization became an independent department on its own and in 1988 the Florya Atatürk Marine Mansion was added to the list of properties controlled by it, followed by Filizli Mansion in 1991, and Yıldız Porcelain and Hereke İpekli Weaving and Carpet Factories in 1994. On 10 July 2018, the institution was connected to the Office of President with the Presidential Decree No. 1 and its name was changed to the "Directorate of National Palaces".

== Palaces and properties ==
- Aynalıkavak Pavilion
- Beylerbeyi Palace
- Çırağan Palace
- Dolmabahçe Palace
- Filizli Mansion
- Florya Atatürk Marine Mansion
- Hereke İpekli Weaving and Carpet Factory
- Ihlamur Pavilion
- Küçüksu Pavilion
- Marble Pavilion
- Maslak Pavilion
- Yalova Atatürk Mansion
- Yıldız Porcelain Factory
- Yıldız Palace
