= Ottoman gunboat Hizir Reis =

Gunboat

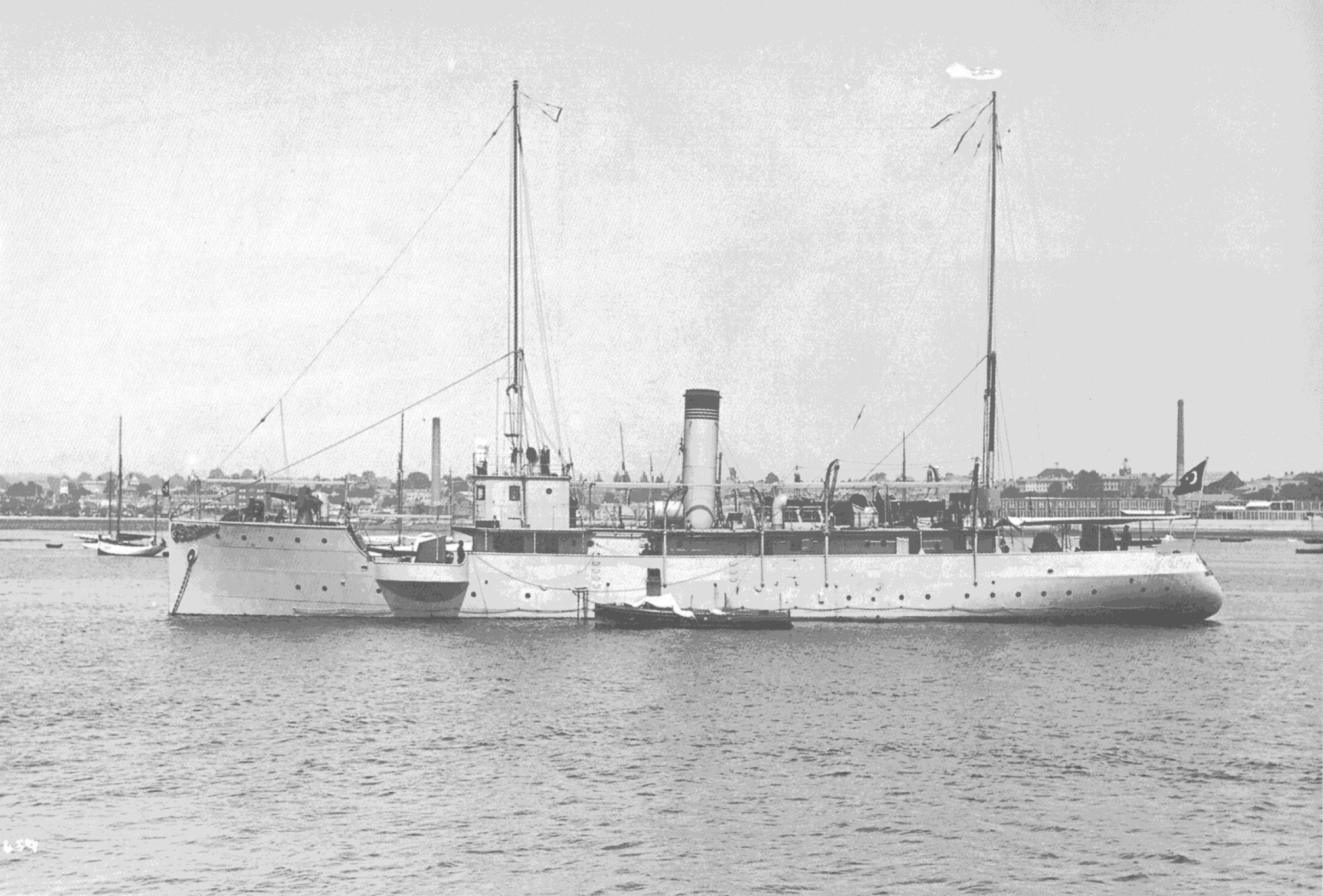
- Sister ship İsa Reis at anchor off Southampton in July 1914

History

Ottoman Empire
- Name: Hızır Reis
- Namesake: Hayreddin Barbarossa (Hızır Reis)
- Builder: SA Des Forges & Chantiers de la Mediterranée, Le Havre-Graville, France
- Laid down: 1911
- Launched: 10 April 1912
- Commissioned: 13 April 1914
- Decommissioned: 1952
- Fate: Converted to a transport ship, 1958

Turkey
- Name: 1959: Turgut Reis; 1960: Emin; 1981: Murat Ayanoğlu; 1982: Kaptan Cavit; 1995: Miktat Kalkavan
- Identification: IMO number: 5103364
- Status: Active as of 2018

General characteristics
- Displacement: 413 t (406 long tons)
- Length: 47 m (154 ft 2 in)
- Beam: 7.9 m (25 ft 11 in)
- Draft: 1.3 m (4 ft 3 in)
- Installed power: 3 × Scotch boilers; 850 ihp (630 kW)
- Propulsion: 2 shafts; 2 triple-expansion steam engines
- Speed: 11 knots (20 km/h; 13 mph)
- Complement: 12 officers, 38 men
- Armament: 3 × 76 mm (3 in) guns; 2 × 47 mm (1.9 in) guns

Hızır Reis is ship that formerly served as an gunboat of the Ottoman Empire in the First World War. The ship currently survives as the transport ship Miktat Kalkavan.

Hızır Reis was damaged by hitting a Turkish mine near Rumelikavağı on 10 January 1915. It returned to service in 1916. It was captured by the Greeks during the Occupation of Izmir on May 14, 1919 . It was returned to Turkey in 1922. The ship was converted to a minesweeper, and a stationary pilot ship in Izimiar 1948. It was decommissioned in 1952. Sold in 1958 and converted to civilian cargo ship. The ship was renamed Turgut Reis in 1959, Emin in 1960, Murat Ayanoğlu in 1981, and then Kaptan Cavit in 1982, and in October 1995 Miktat Kalkavan. As of 2018, she was still in use as a transport ship.

== Design ==
Hızır Reis was built by SA Des Forges & Chantiers de la Mediterranée in Le Havre-Graville, as gunboat with a keel length of 47.0 meters a beam of 7.9 meters and a 1.3 meter draft. Its hull was made of steel. The displacement of the ship is 413 tons. As built the ship's crew consisted of 12 officers and 48 sailors.

The ship was powered by two vertical triple expansion steam engines heated by three Scotch SAFC Granville boilers . The engines had 850 indicated horsepower and were able to accelerate the ship to 14 knots during sea trials, 11 knots in 1915 and 12 knots in 1932.

As built, the ship carried three 76 mm Cruesot rapid-fire cannons and 100 rounds, two 47 mm Cruesot rapid-fire cannons with 1,200 rounds of ammunition as well as two 7.6 mm Hotchkiss machine guns with 31,700 rounds of ammunition. Two of the 76 mm guns were mounted on the forward sponsons and one aft. After its modernization in 1926, the guns were changed to two 76 mm Cruesot rapid-fire guns and two 47 mm Cruesot rapid-fire guns. In 1946 the ship's weapons were dismantled.

== Service history ==
Hızır Reis was ordered from the French company Forges & Chantiers de la Mediterranée in April 1911 and was laid down in the same year. Launched on April 10, 1912, after the completion of the sea trials of the equipment the ship came to Istanbul and entered service in the Ottoman navy on 13 April 1914.

On January 10, 1915, while returning from a patrol mission, the ship struck a mine near the third mine line protecting the Bosphorus. The ship, which suffered serious damage in its bow, was towed to İstinye and put on the slipway. The ship, which had difficulties in its repair, remained in repair until the middle of the year. After this incident, the fleet command gave the order to lay the mines again and to clear the passage channels.

After the Armistice of Mudros, the entire Ottoman fleet was interned under the control of the Allies. On February 26, 1919, at the request of the Ottoman authorities and with the approval of the British commander, Vice-Admiral Somerset Gough-Calthorpe, some Ottoman ships were assigned to patrol duties to prevent weapons from being smuggled into Anatolia. For this purpose, Hızır Reis was assigned to patrol in İzmir, Aydın Reis and Preveze in the Black Sea, and Akhisar and Draç in the Sea of Marmara.

When the Greek forces occupied İzmir on 14 May 1919, Hızır Reis, Nusret, motor gunboat No 14 and transport ship Tirimüjgan were in İzmir port. While Nusret and Tirimüjgan were released a few weeks later, Hızır Reis and No 14 were seized by the Greeks on 6 July.

After the victory of the Ankara government in the Turkish War of Independence, the ship returned to Turkey in 1922. Modernized in 1923, used for a time as an artillery training ship. The gunboats Hızır Reis and İsa Reis, which served as support to the gendarmerie units going to Gökçeada and Bozcaada, became the first ships of the Turkish Navy to sail out of the Sea of Marmara. Later Isa Reis and Kemal Reisthe gunboats were transferred to the Seyr-i Sefain Administration to perform coastal patrol and control services, and were later taken back and made a minesweeper in 1932; It was given to the Mine Search-Scanning Flotilla Commodore on September 30, 1935, with the mine search-scan amendment. In 1948, it was converted into a stationary pilot ship at İzmir. It was removed from naval service in 1952. The ship was sold in 1958 and converted into a civilian cargo ship. It was renamed Turgut Reis in 1959, Emin in 1960, Murat Ayanoğlu in 1983, and then Kaptan Cavit, and finally in October 1995 Miktat Kalkavan. In 2018, it was still in use as a transport ship.

== See also ==
- List of patrol vessels of the Ottoman steam navy

== Bibliography ==
- Gardiner, Robert (1985). Conway's All the World's Fighting Ships 1906–1921 . London: Conway Maritime Press. ISBN 978-0-87021-907-8 .
- Langensiepen, Bernd; Güleryüz, Ahmet (1995). The Ottoman Steam Navy 1828–1923 . London: Conway Maritime Press. ISBN 0-85177-610-8.
