= Marble Pavilion =

Pavilion in the Beylerbeyi Palace complex in Üsküdar, Istanbul, Turkey

- Mermer Köşk
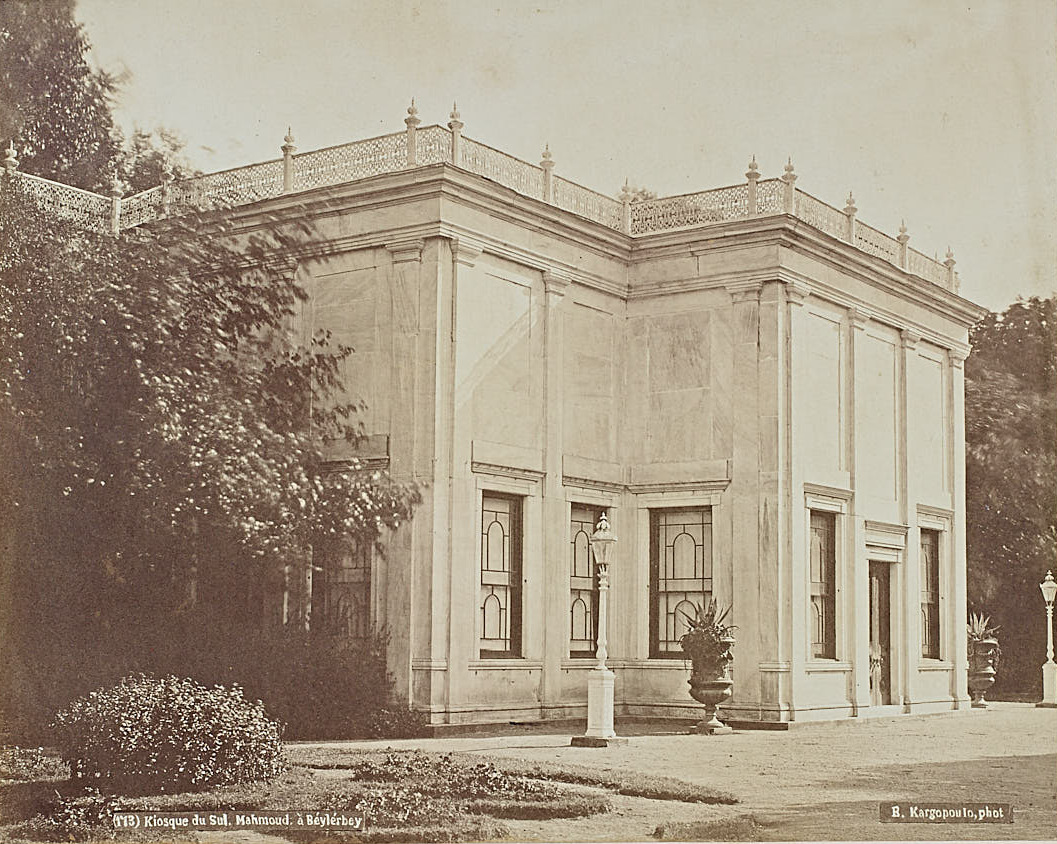
- View of the front and side façades of the Marble Pavilion (1875)
- Interactive map of the Marble Pavilion area
- Former names: Serdâb Pavilion

General information
- Type: Pavilion
- Architectural style: Empire; Neobaroque
- Location: Üsküdar, Istanbul, Turkey
- Construction started: 1829
- Completed: 1832
- Renovated: 1985; 2008–2011
- Owner: Directorate of National Palaces

Technical details
- Structural system: Masonry
- Material: Brick
- Floor count: 1

Marble Pavilion or Serdâb Pavilion is a pavilion located in the Beylerbeyi Palace complex in the Üsküdar district of Istanbul.

The Marble Pavilion was erected at the same time as the Beylerbeyi Palace, whose construction began in 1829 and was completed in 1832. When the original wooden palace was demolished between 1861 and 1863 to make way for a new Beylerbeyi Palace, the pavilion—named for its marble-clad exterior—remained the only surviving structure of the old complex. Following the proclamation of the Republic and the nationalization law of 1924, it passed into the care of the Grand National Assembly of Turkey and, in 1925, was placed under the newly formed Directorate of National Palaces. Although it opened to visitors alongside the palace in 1964, it closed again in 1971 and did not reopen with the main building in 1981. Finally, in 1985 the entire palace complex—now including the Marble Pavilion—was granted museum status and reopened to the public on 5 July that year. The pavilion later underwent a thorough restoration between 2008 and 2011.

The pavilion occupies the fourth terrace garden of the complex, offering a cool retreat during the summer months. This single-storey masonry building stretches roughly north–south, with its central block—a rectangular hall—jutting out slightly from the west-facing façade. The front and side elevations are clad entirely in marble in the Empire style, while the plastered rear wall encloses a small courtyard. Inside, a symmetrical plan unfolds around the main hall: two identical rectangular chambers flank the central space, and service areas (including a toilet) occupy the eastern end. At the heart of the hall lies a shallow marble pool pierced by an Irrigation sprinkler and flanked on each wall by a decorative salsabil. Above, the ceilings of the hall and side rooms are framed by delicate lattice of wooden laths, their geometric panels filled with hand-painted motifs and pictorial scenes that blend the opulence of Neo-Baroque ornament with the clarity of Empire classicism.

== History ==
Construction of the Marble Pavilion was ordered in 1829 by Sultan Mahmud II of the Ottoman Empire as part of the same project that began the First Beylerbeyi Palace, which was completed in 1832.

Between 1861 and 1863 the original wooden pavilion was demolished, and construction of the new Beylerbeyi Palace—including the Marble Pavilion—began on the same site.

The pavilion takes its name from the marble cladding on its exterior façades and is the only surviving structure of the original Beylerbeyi complex. Julia Pardoe described it as an "open-air bath" that "looks like a toy." During the reign of Sultan Abdülaziz decorative railings were added around its terrace. Two wooden pigeon-houses (kuşluk) built by Ohannes Kalfa in front of the pavilion were later removed.

The marble fountain in the main salon was removed after 1890 and re-installed in the seaward garden of the Mabeyn-i Hümayûn at Dolmabahçe Palace, and replaced in the pavilion's salon by a different marble fountain.

After the proclamation of the Republic of Turkey, Beylerbeyi Palace ceased to be the private property of the sultans. Under Article 9 of the Law on the Abolition of the Caliphate and the Exclusion of the Ottoman Dynasty from the Territory of Turkey (3 March 1924), all sultanic properties were nationalized and placed under the administration of the Grand National Assembly of Turkey. By decree no. 1371 of 8 January 1925, Beylerbeyi and Dolmabahçe palaces were transferred to the newly established Directorate of National Palaces for preservation.

On 10 July 1964 the palace was opened to visitors by decision of the Presidency Council of the Grand National Assembly; however it was closed again on 14 January 1971 "due to the possibility of sabotage." Reopened on 28 March 1981 by decree no. 1113, the Marble Pavilion remained closed to the public until it and the Ahır Pavilion were granted museum status and opened on 5 July 1985. The pavilion underwent restoration between 2008 and 2011.
