= Treaty of Aynalıkavak =

1779 treaty between the Ottoman and Russian Empires

Aynalıkavak bond of arbitration
- Type: Commercial treaty
- Signed: March 10, 1779
- Location: Istanbul, Ottoman Empire
- Parties: Russian Empire; Ottoman Empire
- Languages: Russian, Ottoman Turkish

Treaty of Aynalıkavak was a treaty between Ottoman Empire and Russian Empire signed on March 10, 1779. The formal name is Aynalıkavak bond of arbitration (Turkish: Aynalıkavak tenkihnamesi). Aynalıkavak is a palace in İstanbul where the treaty was signed.

== Background ==
The Ottoman Empire lost the Crimean Khanate, an Ottoman dependency since 1478, under the terms of the 1774 Treaty of Küçükkaynarca. Crimean Khan Devlet Giray (Devlet IV) appealed to the Ottoman Porte to renew the region's dependency, a proposal that was not possible under the terms of Küçükkaynarca. The Russian government forced Devlet IV to abdicate upon hearing of his entreaties to the Ottomans and replaced him with a khan they could better manipulate, Şahin Giray. The Ottomans declared the Russian intervention in the Crimea against the terms of the Treaty of Küçükkaynarca.

== The Treaty ==
With the French ambassador acting as a mediator, the two empires signed the Treaty of Aynalıkavak to resolve ongoing tensions in the Crimea. The terms of the treaty were

1. The terms of the Treaty of Küçükkaynarca were ratified
2. Both empires promised not to interfere Crimean politics
3. The Russians promised to withdraw their troops from the khanate in three months and twenty days
4. The Ottoman Empire acknowledged Şahin Giray as khan
5. Russian merchant ships were granted the right to free passage in the Mediterranean Sea

== Aftermath ==
Russian empress Catherine II was planning to annex Crimea but was aware of the possible consequences. Catherine entered into talks with Sweden that ensured that Sweden wouldn't enter into an alliance with the Ottomans in the event of a Russian annexation of Crimea. Russia ultimately annexed the peninsula in 1783.
