= Rüsumat No 4 =

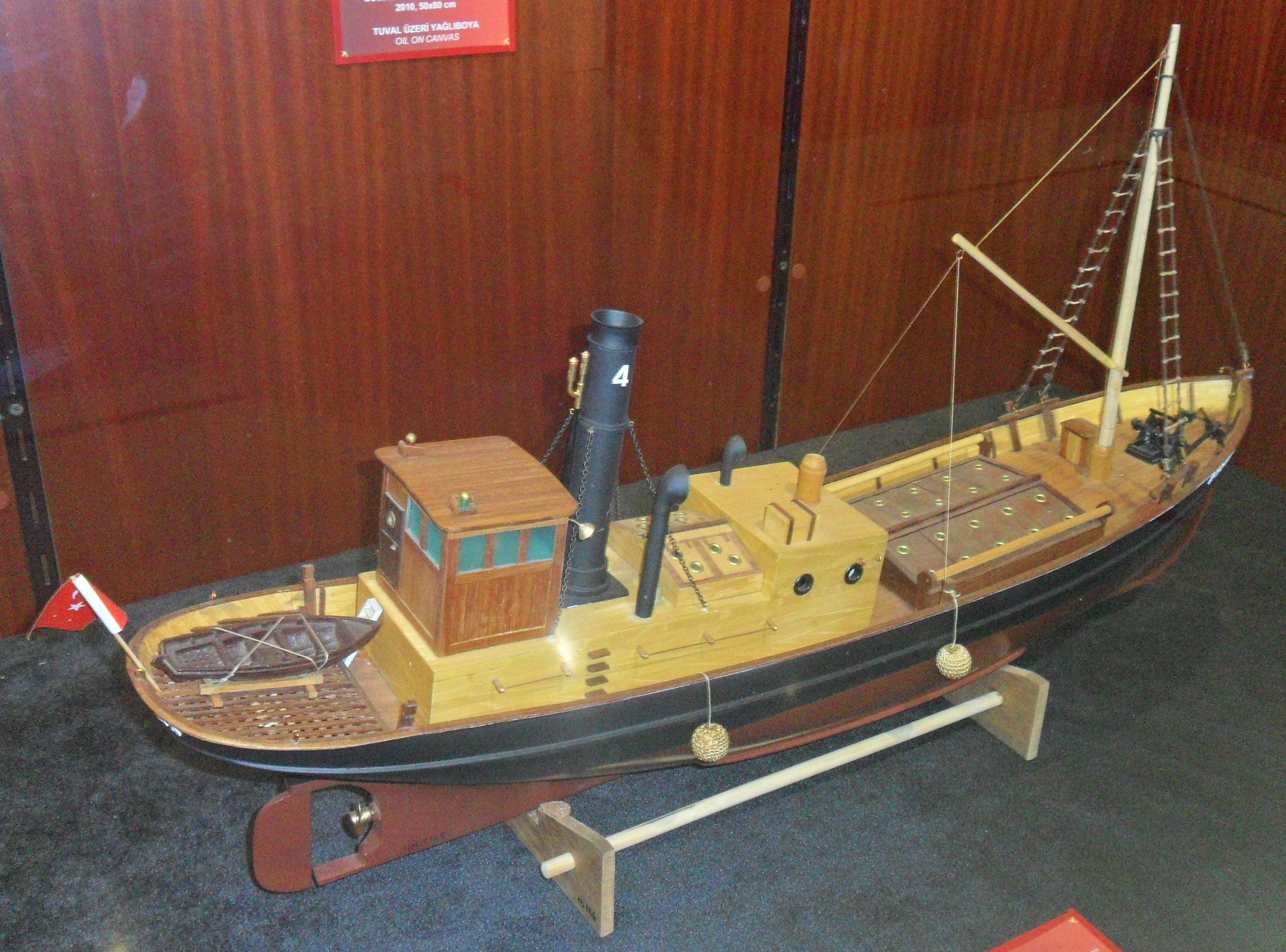
- Model of Rüsumat No. 4 on display at Mersin Naval Museum, Turkey.

History
- Name: Rüsumat No. 4
- Owner: 1891–1913 United Kingdom; 1913–1919 Ottoman Empire; 1919–1921 Turkey (nationalists)
- Launched: 1891
- Out of service: 1921
- Fate: Sunk 14 October 1921

General characteristics
- Tonnage: 310 gross register tons (GRT)
- Length: 29.8 m (98 ft)
- Beam: 8.6 m (28 ft)
- Draught: 3.2 m (10 ft)
- Crew: 16

Related locations for Rüsumat No. 4

Rüsumat No. 4 was a former Turkish trawler, which is known for her resupply missions in along the Black Sea coast of Turkey during the Turkish War of Independence.

== History ==
She was built in 1891, and purchased by the Ottoman government in 1913. During World War I, she served in the Ottoman navy, first as a minesweeper and then as a coastguard vessel. After the end of the war, in which the Ottoman Empire was defeated, she anchored in Karadeniz Ereğli, a port on the western Black Sea.

== In the Turkish War of Independence ==
In 1919, the ship was seized by the nationalists and beginning by 12 November 1920 she began serving as a military cargo ship to transfer artillery from the East Anatolia and Batumi to West Anatolia ports. The Allies naval ships tried to catch her. However, she managed to escape every time. Consequently, she was nicknamed the "ghost ship".

== Last two voyages ==
On 17 July 1921 during her ninth voyage, while carrying two British made 88 mm guns and 354 ammunition boxes from Batumi, she was spotted by two Greek warships. She could escape to Ordu, which was then a port without harbor facilities. The citizens of Ordu helped to unload the artillery before the Greek ship showed up and the captain Mahmut, who later adopted the surname Gökbora, shipwrecked Rüsumat. To fool the chasers, he also set fire on the board. The Greek torpedo boat Dafni arrived; but seeing the fire they quickly left Ordu. After the fire was extinguished, the captain cleaned the ship, managed to float the ship, used hazelnut oil to activate the engines and sailed to Batumi for repairs. After repairs, she began her tenth and last voyage on 25 September 1921. She successfully reached Samsun port. But during her return voyage, she was spotted again by the Dafni and this time she was shelled, hit 13 times and sunk off Eynesil, Giresun Province, on 14 October 1921.
