= Maslak Pavilion =

Ottoman pavilion in Istanbul, Turkey

Coordinates: 41°07′10″N 29°01′30″E

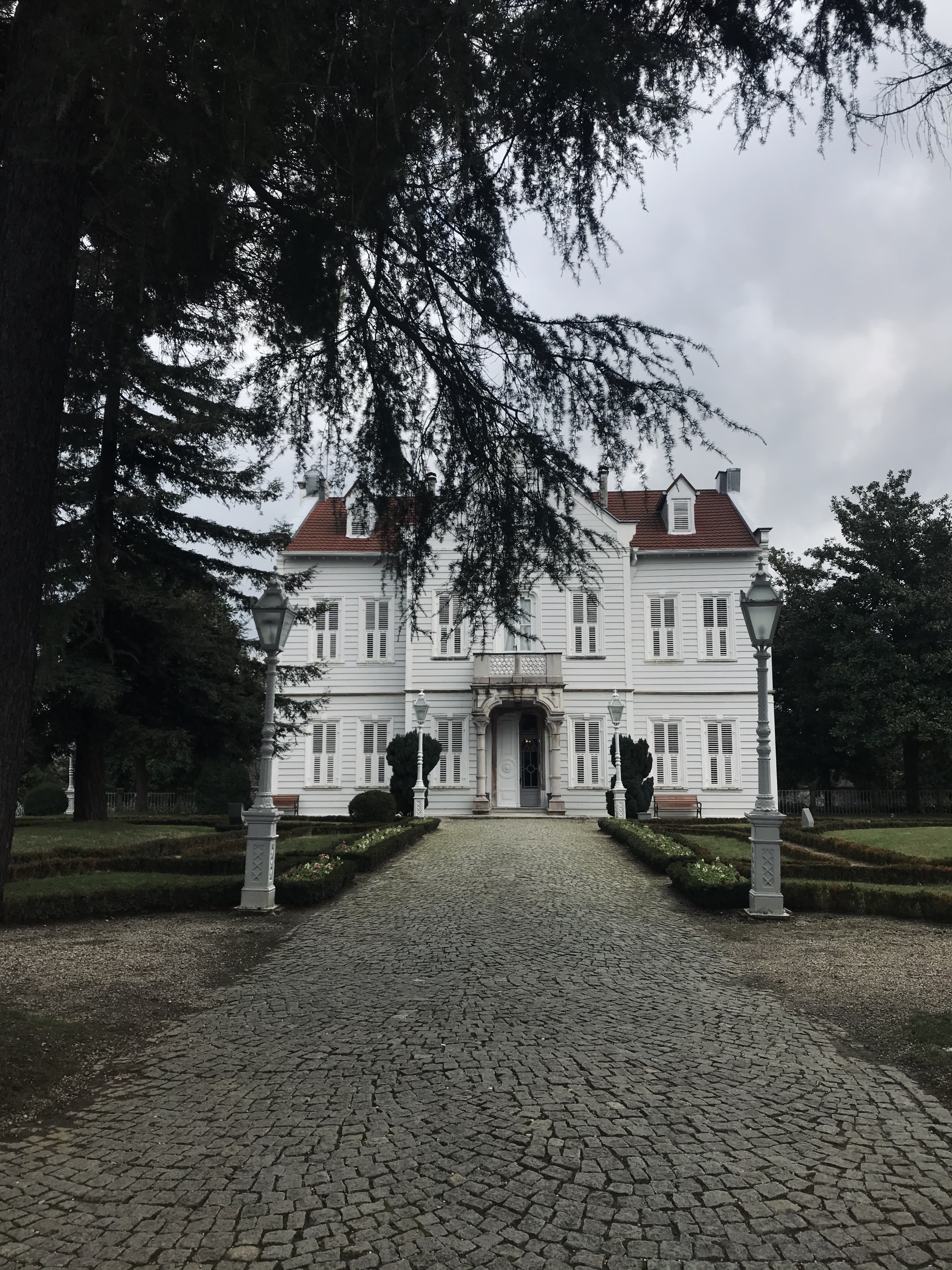

Maslak Pavilion (Turkish: Maslak Kasrı) is a former imperial Ottoman pavilion located in Istanbul, Turkey. It was constructed during the reign of Sultan Abdülaziz (1861–1876). It is under the administration of the Turkish Directorate of National Palaces. Today it is used as a museum.

== History ==
The initial development on the site began during the reign of Mahmud II, however, the pavilions as they exist today were largely constructed by Abdülaziz in the 1860s. Abdul Hamid II, who as a prince used the structure as a hunting lodge, expanded the estate by purchasing surrounding lands, transforming it into a farm. It was here that he received the news that Murad V had been deposed and that he himself had become the new sovereign in 1876. During his reign, the estate was known as the "Maslak Imperial Farm" (Maslak Çiflikât-ı Hümâyûnu). The pavilion served as a military preventorium between 1937 and 1982, and was converted into a museum in 1984.

== Literature ==
- Erdal Eren, Semra Karakaşlı, Ezel İlter. Maslak Pavilion. TBMM, Istanbul, 1994.
