= Ottoman torpedo gunboat Peleng-i Derya =

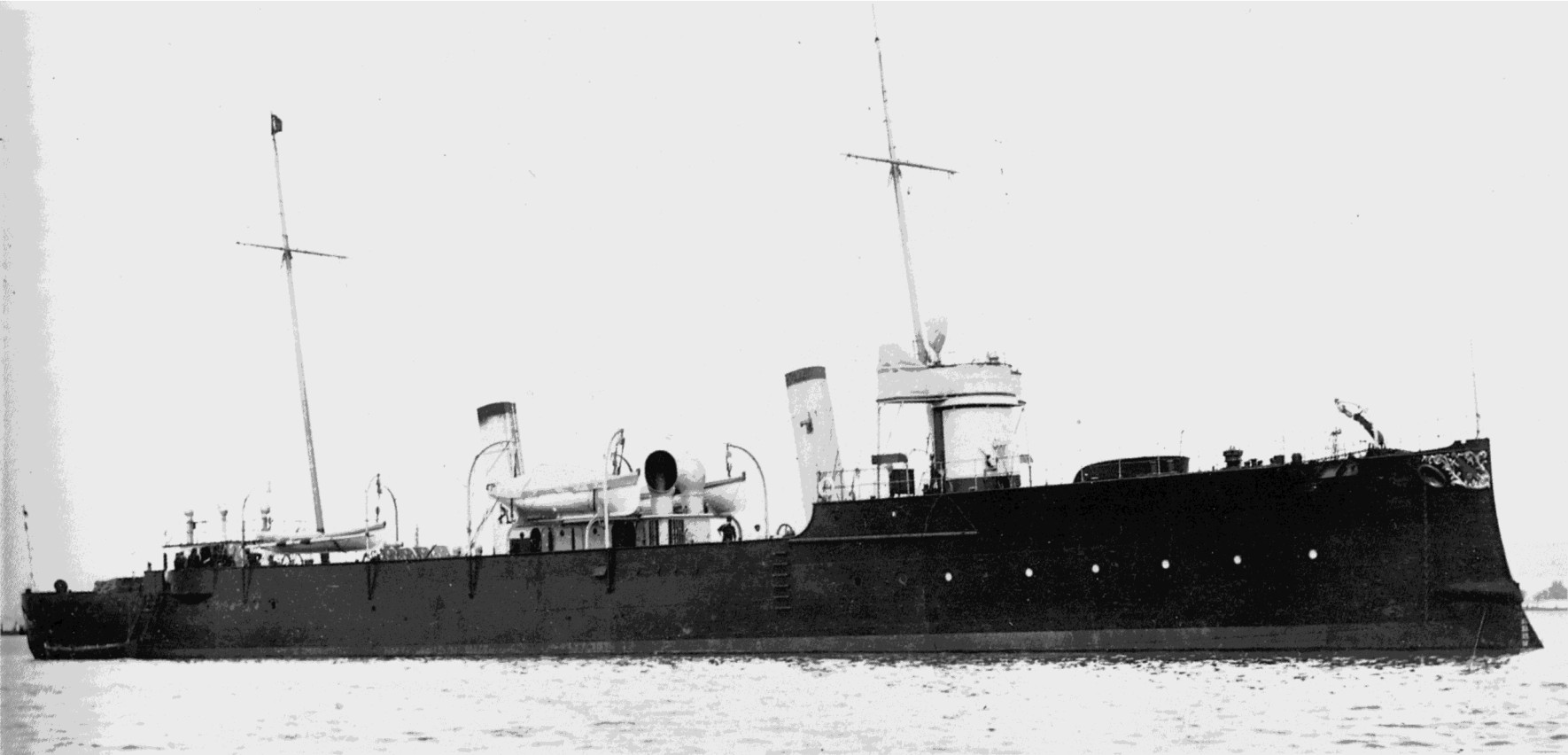
- Peleng-i Derya in Southampton (1896)

History

Ottoman Empire
- Name: Peleng-i Derya
- Namesake: Tiger of the Sea
- Ordered: 1887
- Builder: Friedrich Krupp Germaniawerft A. G.
- Laid down: 1889
- Launched: 1890
- Completed: 1890
- In service: 1890
- Out of service: 23 May 1915
- Fate: Torpedoed and sunk 23 May 1915

General characteristics
- Class & type: Peleng-i Deryâ-class gunboat
- Displacement: 980 tons
- Length: 75.5 m (247 ft 8 in)
- Beam: 8.5 m (27 ft 11 in)
- Depth: 2.9 m (9 ft 6 in)
- Installed power: 2 triple expansion engines
- Propulsion: Double screw propellers
- Speed: 18 knots (33 km/h; 21 mph)
- Crew: 85
- Armament: 2 x 120 mm QF K; 2 x 90 mm QF K; 3 x 75 mm QF K; 4 x 47 mm QF N; 3 x MG (1906); 3 x TT 355 mm SK

Peleng-i Derya was an Ottoman gunboat that was torpedoed by HMS E11 in shallow water off Istanbul, Ottoman Empire on 23 May 1915.

== Construction ==
Peleng-i Derya was laid down in 1889 and launched and completed the following year at the Schiffswerft Germania AG shipyard in Kiel, Germany as part of the Peleng-i Deryâ class alongside her sister ship Nimet. The ship was 75.5 metres (247 ft 8 in) long, had a beam of 8.5 metres (27 ft 11 in) and had a depth of 2.9 metres (9 ft 6 in). She was assessed at 980 GRT and had two triple expansion engines driving two screw propellers. The ship could generate 4,700 indicated horsepower (3,500 kW) with a speed of 18 knots (33 km/h; 21 mph). She conducted her sea trials on 16 May 1896 and had an accidental boiler explosion on 22 May at Eckernförde, Germany.

== Early career ==
Peleng-i Derya was bought by the Ottoman Navy in September 1896, but the six year old ship had not been equipped yet with any armaments. She was brought to a shipyard in Istanbul to be refitted with her armaments consisting of two 120-millimetre (4.7 in) quick-firing (QF) Krupp (K) guns, two 90 mm (3.5 in) QF K guns, three 75 mm (3.0 in) QF K guns, four 47 mm (1.9 in) QF Nordenfelt (N) guns, three machine guns (1906) and three 355 mm (14.0 in) SK torpedo tubes. As time went on, her condition worsened and she was decommissioned in 1913 before returning to service at the start of the First World War in September 1914.

== Sinking ==
Peleng-i Derya was anchored in shallow water near Bakırköy Bay at Istanbul on 23 May 1915 when the British submarine HMS E11 torpedoed her without warning. The ship capsized and sank with the loss of two crew, and her wreck was scrapped in 1920.

== Wreck ==
The wreck of Peleng-i Derya was broken up in 1920 with some parts still being present to this day.

== Bibliography ==
- Langensiepen, Bernd; Güleryüz, Ahmet (1995). The Ottoman Steam Navy 1828–1923. London: Conway Maritime Press. ISBN 978-0-85177-610-1.
- Gardiner, Robert (1985). Conway's All the World's Fighting Ships 1906–1921. London: Conway Maritime Press. ISBN 9780870219078.
