= Ihlamur Pavilion =

Former imperial Ottoman summer palace located in Istanbul, Turkey

Coordinates: 41°03′03″N 29°00′06″E

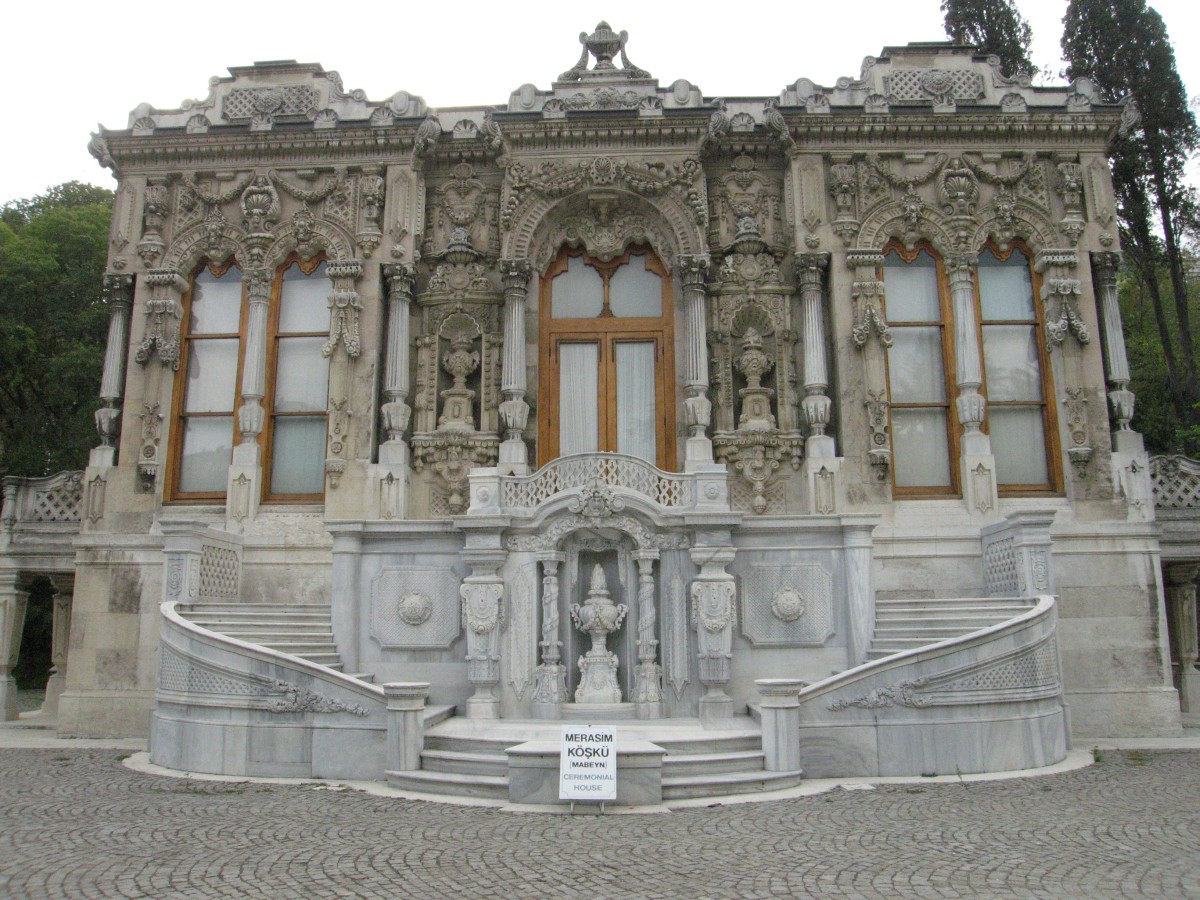
Ceremonial Pavilion

Ihlamur Palace (Turkish: Ihlamur Kasrı, lit. Linden Pavilion), is a former imperial Ottoman summer pavilion located in Istanbul, Turkey. It was constructed during the reign of Sultan Abdülmecid I (1839-1860). It is under the administration of the Turkish Directorate of National Palaces.Architecture Nigoğayos Balyan arm.Նիկողայոս Բալյան (also spelled Nigogayos Balyan) (Armenian architect from an Armenian architects dynasty)

== Image gallery ==
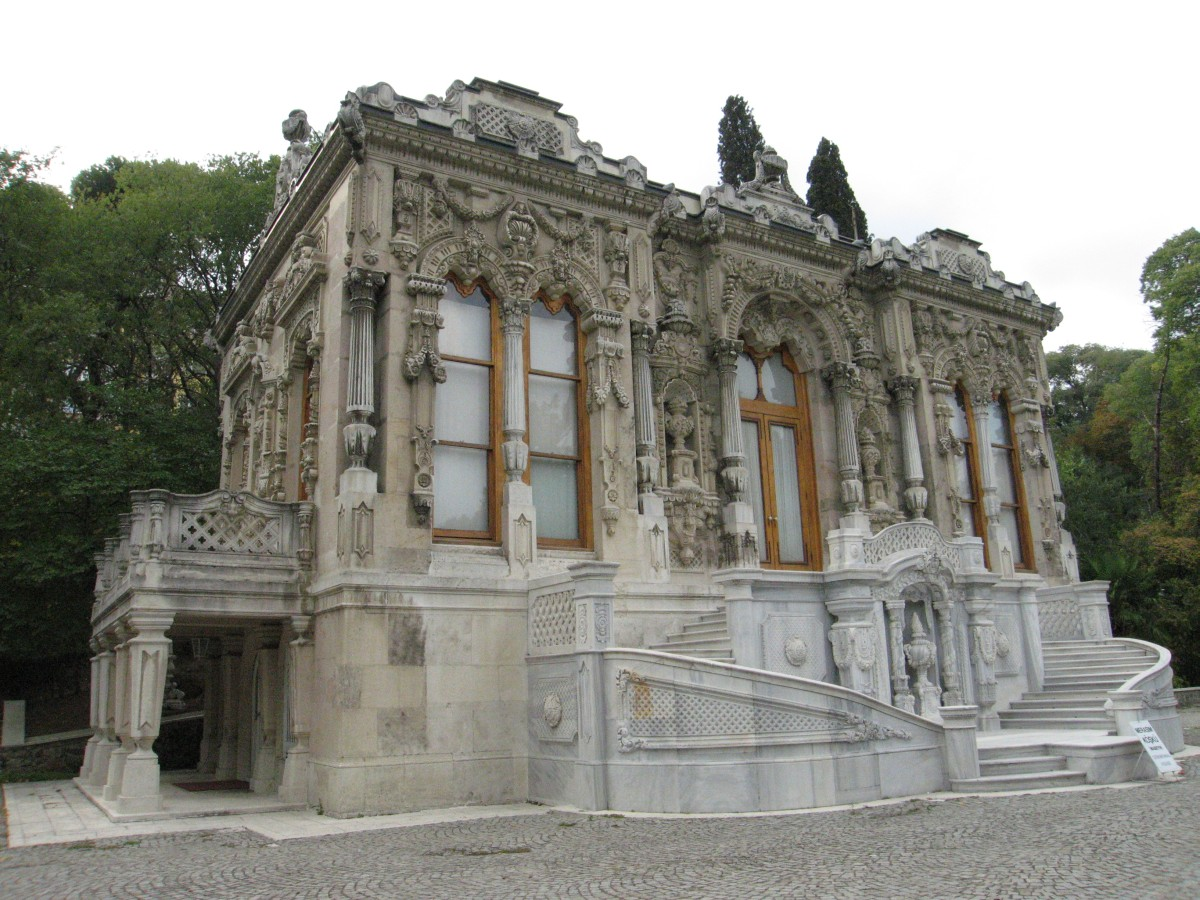
Ceremonial Pavilion

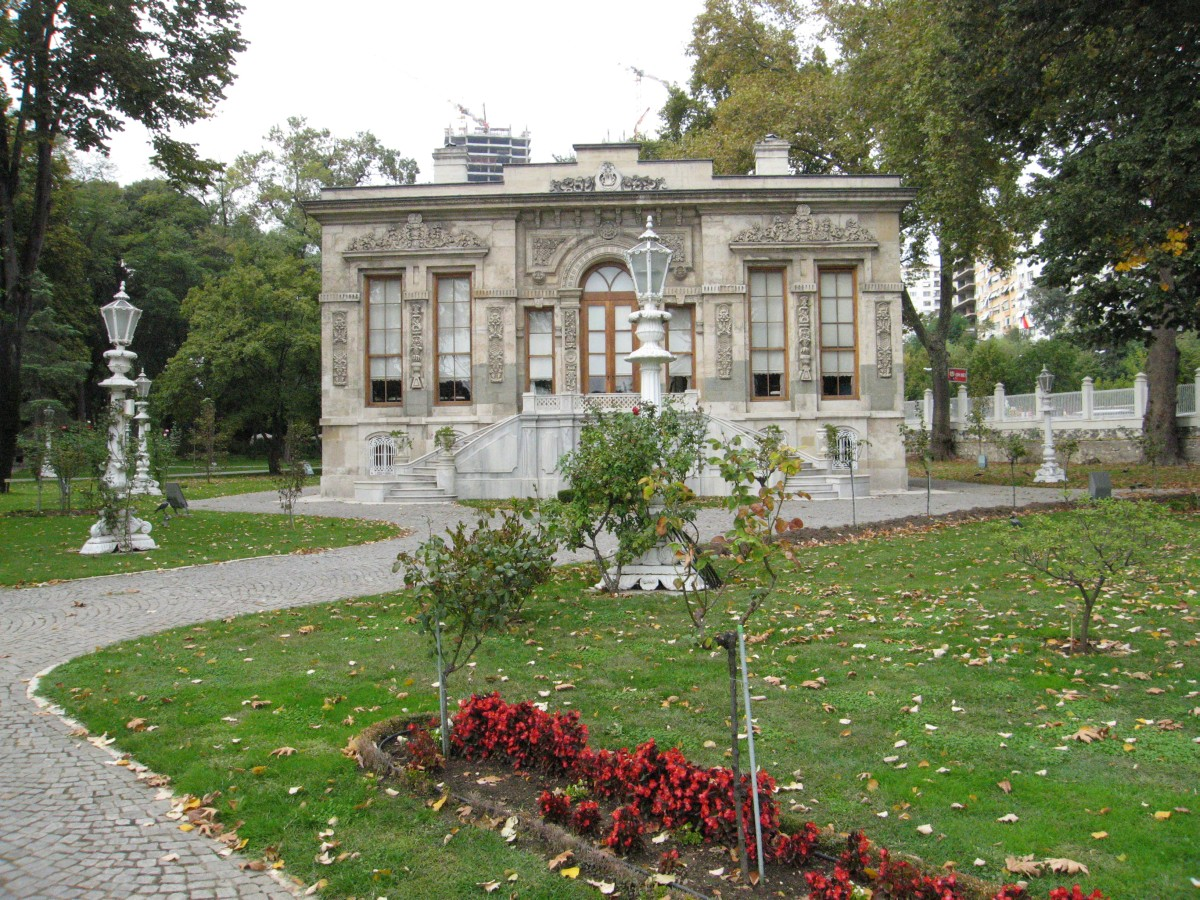
Court Pavilion

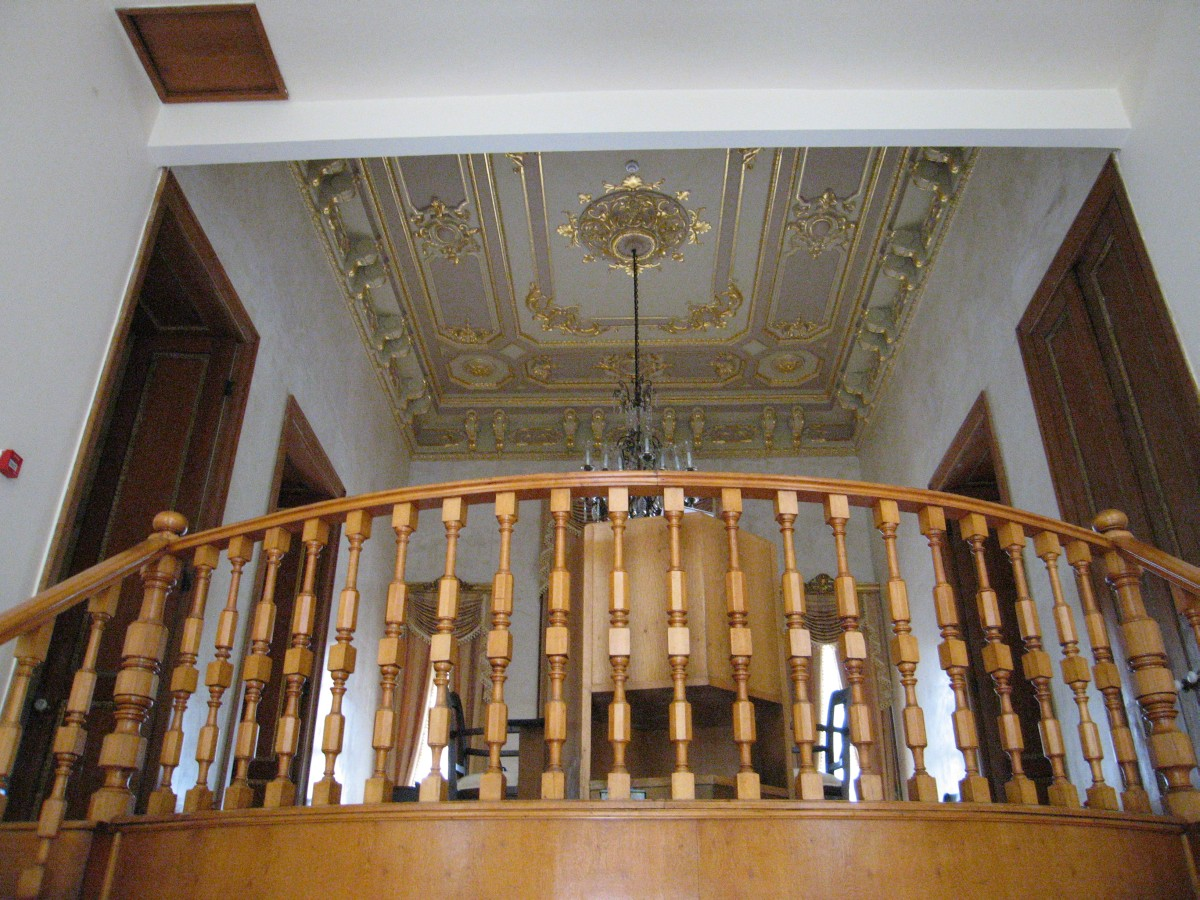
Interior of the Court Pavilion

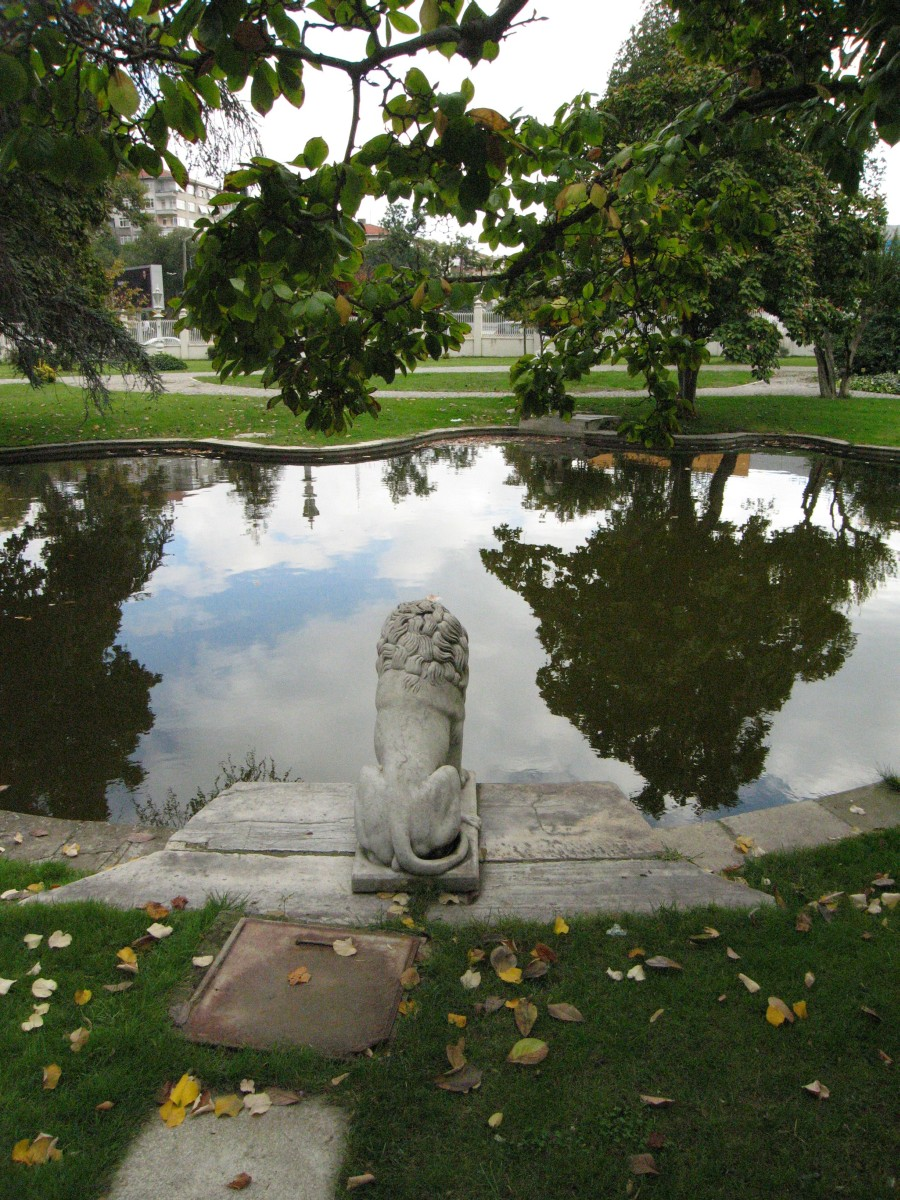
Palatial garden

== Literature ==
- Sema Öner. Ihlamur Pavilion. TBMM, Istanbul, 1994.
