= Yalova Atatürk Mansion =

Turkish mansion

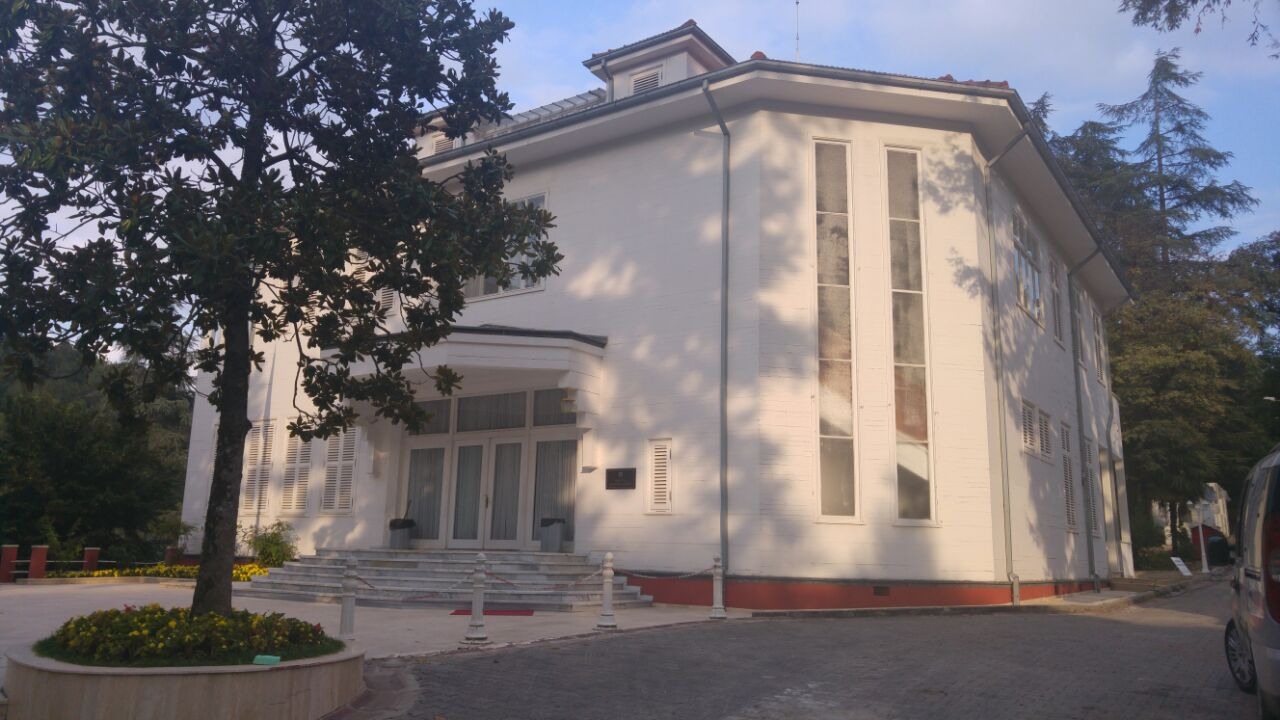

- Location within Turkey
- Established: 1929
- Location: Termal, Yalova Province, Turkey
- Coordinates: 40.60374°N 29.17472°E
- Website: Yalova Atatürk Köşkü - Milli Saraylar (Turkish)

Yalova Atatürk Mansion (Turkish: Yalova Atatürk Köşkü) is a mansion built for and used by Mustafa Kemal Atatürk during his visits to the thermal facilities in Yalova at Marmara region, Turkey. Currently, the building is owned by the Turkish Grand National Assembly and is partly open to public as a house museum.

== History ==
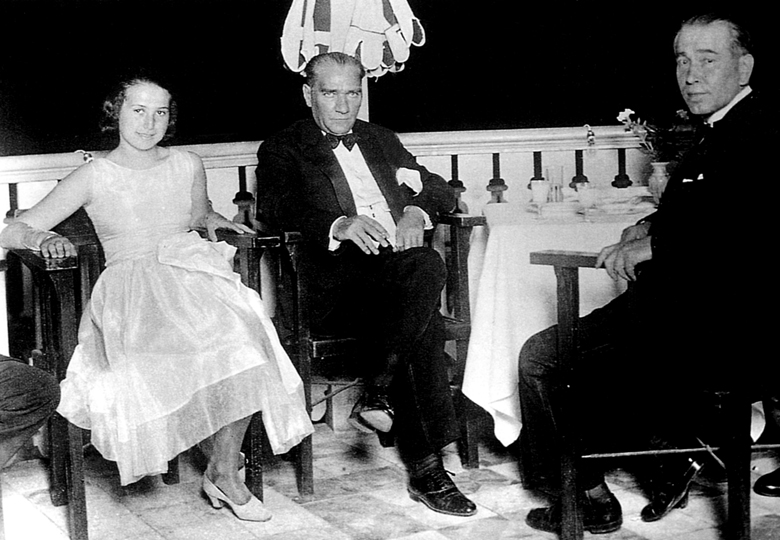
Mustafa Kemal Atatürk with Ali Fethi Okyar and Okyar's daughter in Yalova, on August 13, 1930

Mustafa Kemal Atatürk visited Yalova first in 1927. He went there in summer months for the local thermal facilities. During his visits, he stayed in a wooden pavilion in Baltacı Farm next to the thermal bath, which was built in the 19th century by Sultan Abdülhamid II (reigned 1876–1909).

Atatürk commissioned the construction of a mansion for himself in Millet Farm (Millet Çiftliği). Designed by the architect Sedat Hakkı EldemIt, it was completed in 1929. The mansion was initially called Millet Farm Mansion ("Millet" is the Turkish word for "Nation") after the farm's name in which it was built.

The originally wooden mansion was renovated later. The two-story building has three VIP lounges and eleven rooms. It is equipped with furnitures brought from Dolmabahçe Palace.

Atatürk spent summer months in this mansion. He invited notable Turkish singers and musicians such as Safiye Ayla and Münir Nurettin Selçuk to perform concerts on Turkish classical music. The idea to establish the Turkish Historical Society and the Turkish Language Association was developed at this site.

== Museum ==
Yalova Atatürk Mansion, originally a private property of Atatürk, was transferred to the Turkish Grand National Assembly. After renovation works and fitting with pictures and personal belongings of Atatürk, the mansion was converted into a historical house museum, and opened to public in 1981.

== See also ==
- Atatürk Museums in Turkey
