= Aynalıkavak Pavilion =

Ottoman pavilion in Istanbul, Turkey

Coordinates: 41.03793°N 28.95532°E

Aynalıkavak Pavilion (Turkish: Aynalıkavak Kasrı) is a former Ottoman pavilion located in the Hasköy neighborhood of Beyoğlu district in Istanbul, Turkey. It was constructed during the reign of Sultan Ahmed I (1603–1617), with various additions and changes over time. It is under the administration of the Turkish Directorate of National Palaces.

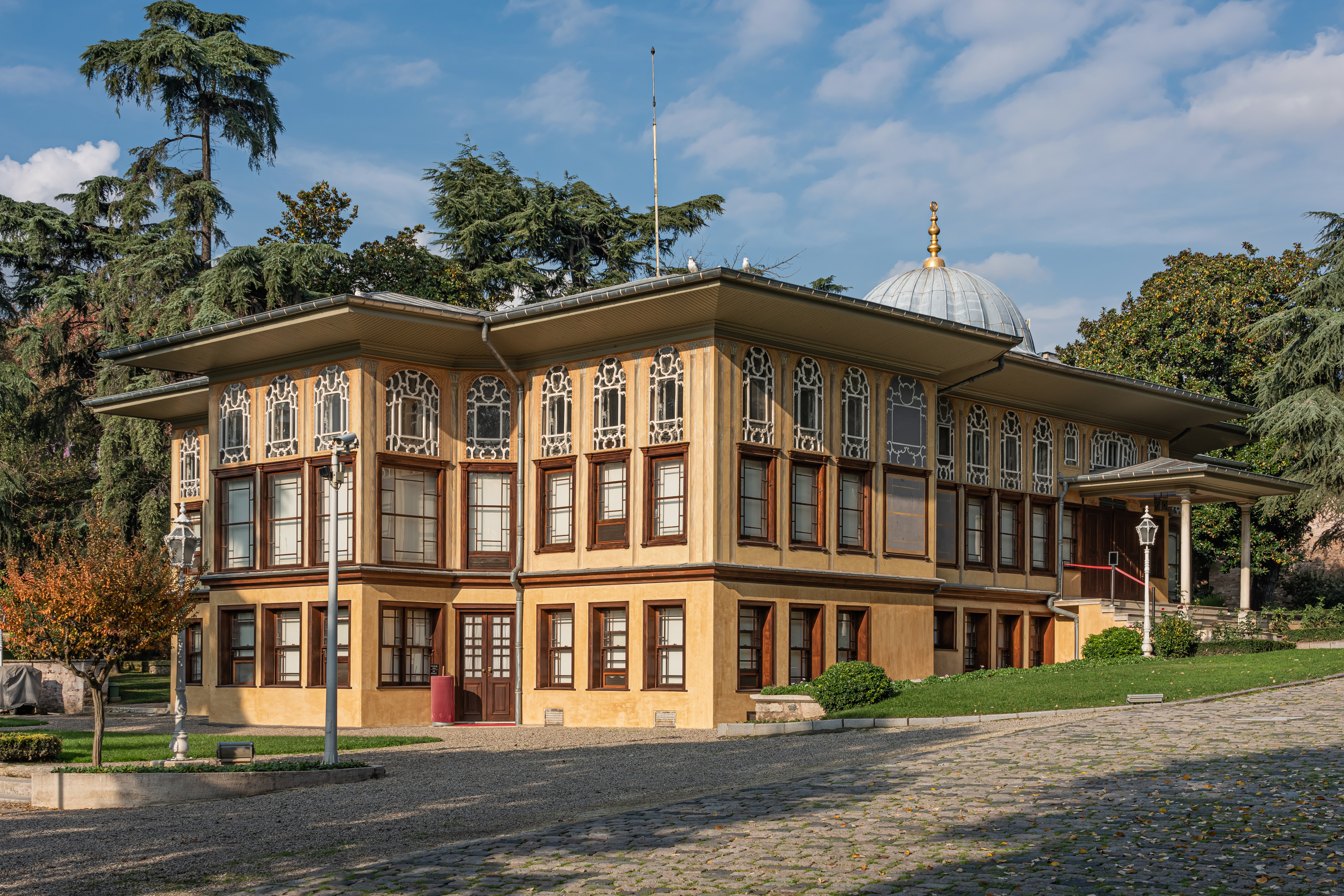
Pavilion exterior

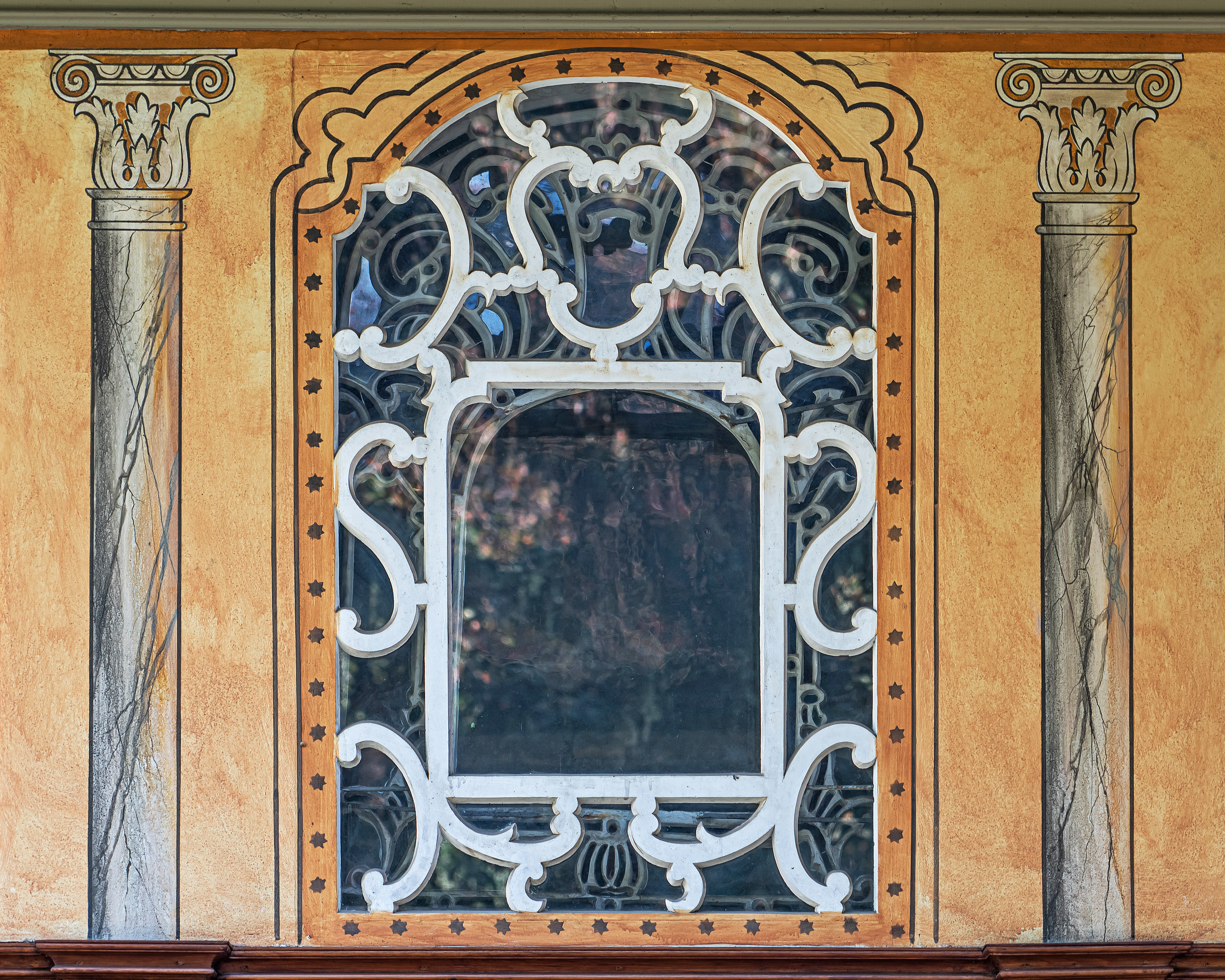
Window detail

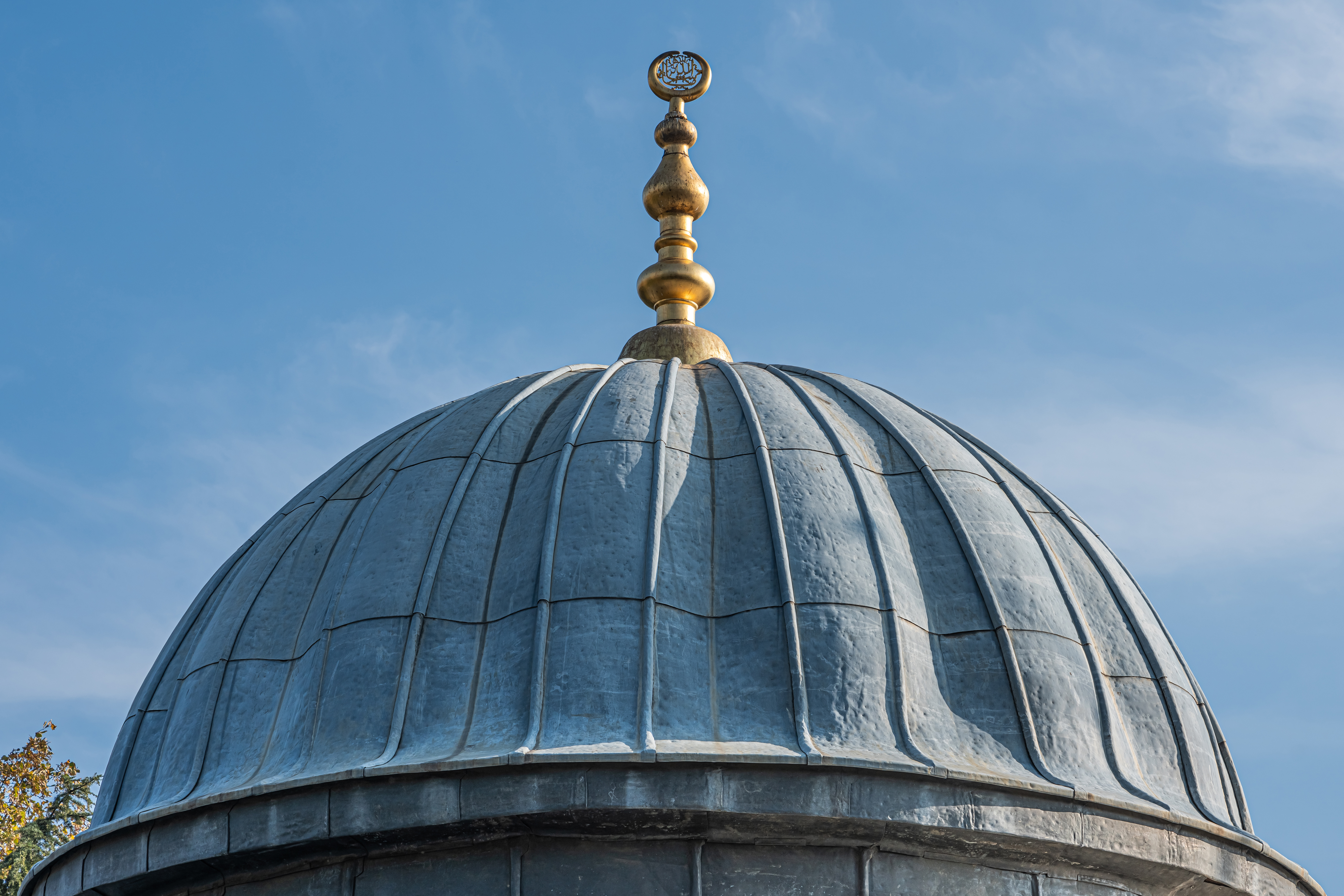
Dome exterior

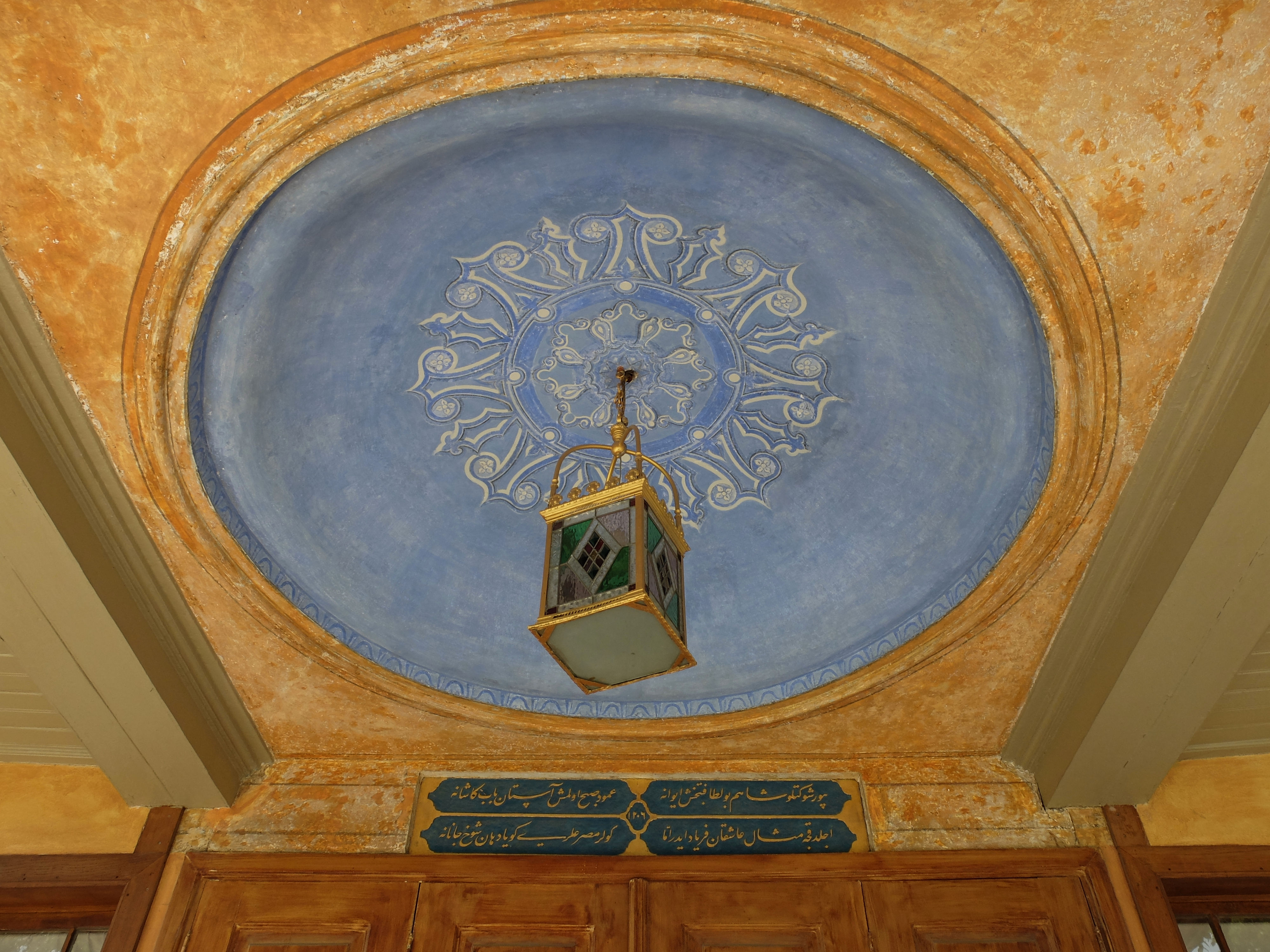
Dome interior

== See also ==
- Ottoman architecture
