= Signal fire =

Signal fire can refer to:

- Fire used as a light signal, a beacon that can be seen from a distance.
  - Beacon (signal fire)
  - Phryctoria
  - Byzantine beacon system
- A smoke signal
- "Signal Fire" (song), a 2007 song by Snow Patrol
- "Signal Fire", a song by Erra from their 2018 album Neon
