= Polybius square =

Type of code

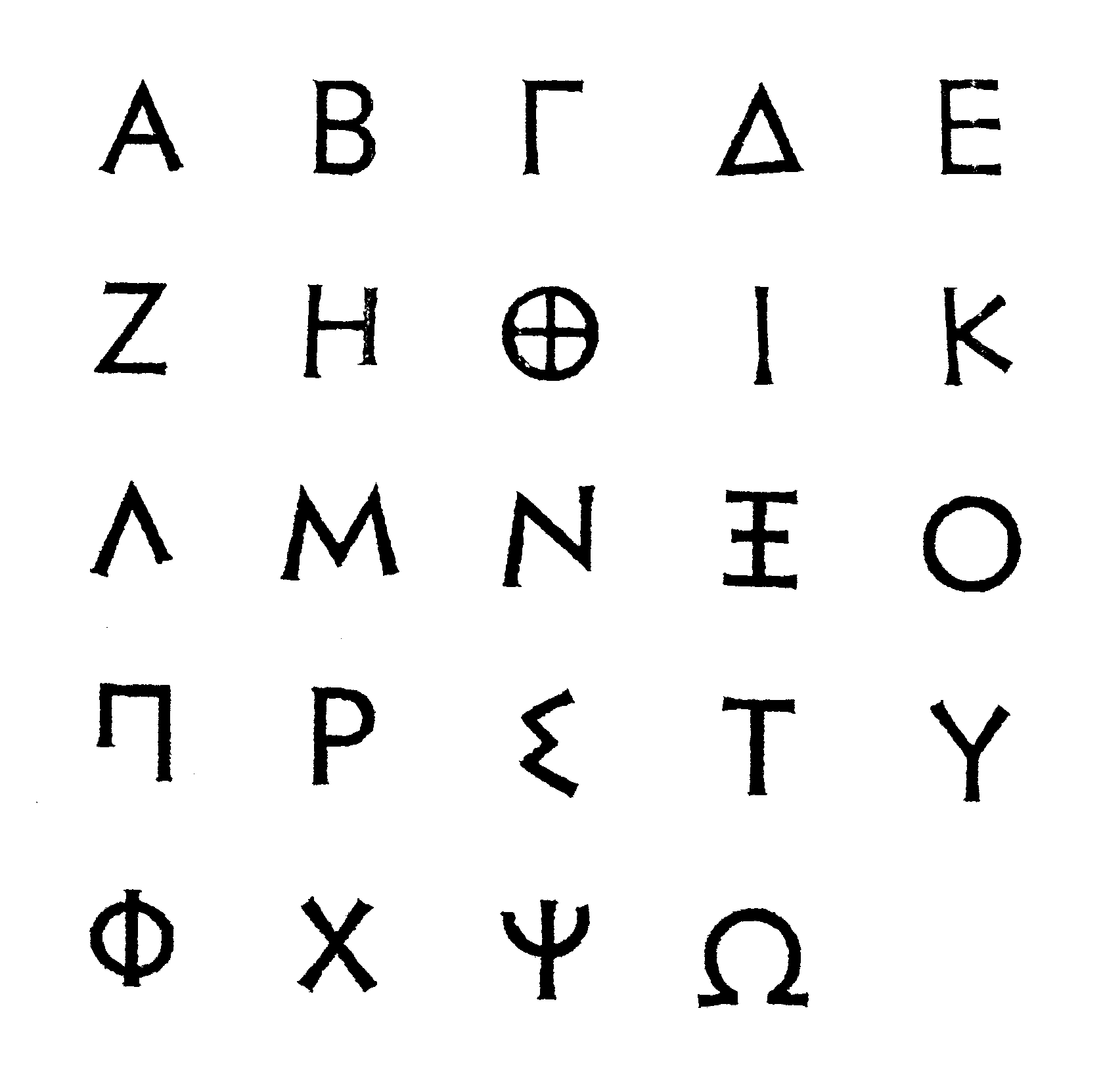
The Greek letters of a Polybius square

The Polybius square, also known as the Polybius checkerboard, is a device invented by the ancient Greeks Cleoxenus and Democleitus, and made famous by the historian and scholar Polybius. The device is used for fractionating plaintext characters so that they can be represented by a smaller set of symbols, which is useful for telegraphy, steganography, and cryptography. The device was originally used for fire signalling, allowing for the coded transmission of any message, not just a finite number of predetermined options as was the convention before.

== Basic form ==
According to Polybius' Histories, the device was invented by Cleoxenus and Democleitus, and further developed by Polybius himself. The device partitioned the alphabet into five tablets with five letters each (except for the last one with only four). There are no surviving tablets from antiquity. Letters are represented by two numbers from one to five, allowing the representation of 25 characters using only 5 numeric symbols.

The original square used the Greek alphabet laid out as follows:

	1	2	3	4	5
1	Α	Β	Γ	Δ	Ε
2	Ζ	Η	Θ	Ι	Κ
3	Λ	Μ	Ν	Ξ	Ο
4	Π	Ρ	Σ	Τ	Υ
5	Φ	Χ	Ψ	Ω	

Modern Greek still uses that same alphabet, as do implementations of the Polybius square in that language.

With the Latin alphabet, this is the typical form:

	1	2	3	4	5
1	A	B	C	D	E
2	F	G	H	I/J	K
3	L	M	N	O	P
4	Q	R	S	T	U
5	V	W	X	Y	Z

This alphabet, and this latter form of the Polybius square, is used when implementing the square in other Western European languages such as English, Spanish, French, German, Italian, Portuguese, and Dutch.

Each letter is then represented by its coordinates in the grid. For example, "BAT" becomes "12 11 44". The 26 letters of the Latin/English alphabet do not fit in a 5 × 5 square, two letters must be combined (usually I and J as above, though C and K is an alternative). Alternatively, a 6 × 6 grid may be used to allow numerals or special characters to be included as well as letters.

A 6 × 6 grid is also usually used for the Cyrillic alphabet (the most common variant has 33 letters, but some have up to 37) or Japanese hiragana (see cryptography in Japan).

A key could be used to reorder the alphabet in the square, with the letters (without duplicates) of the key being placed at the beginning and the remaining letters following it in alphabetical order. For example, the key phrase "polybius cipher" would lead to the reordered square below.

	1	2	3	4	5
1	P	O	L	Y	B
2	I/J	U	S	C	H
3	E	R	A	D	F
4	G	K	M	N	Q
5	T	V	W	X	Z

== Encryption principle ==
There are several encryption methods using the Polybius square. Three of them are described below.

	1	2	3	4	5
1	A	B	C	D	E
2	F	G	H	I/J	K
3	L	M	N	O	P
4	Q	R	S	T	U
5	V	W	X	Y	Z

=== Method 1 ===
Let us encrypt the word "SOMETEXT" with a Caesar cipher using a shift equal to the side of our square (5). To do it, locate the letter of the text and insert the one immediately below it in the same column for the ciphertext. If the letter is in the bottom row, take the one from the top of the same column.

Letter of the text	s	o	m	e	t	e	x	t
Cipher text letter	x	t	r	k	y	k	c	y

Thus, after encryption, we get "xtrkykcy".

=== Method 2 ===
A more complicated method involves a Bifid cipher without a key (or, in other words, with a key of plain alphabet):

	1	2	3	4	5
1	A	B	C	D	E
2	F	G	H	I/J	K
3	L	M	N	O	P
4	Q	R	S	T	U
5	V	W	X	Y	Z

The message is transformed into coordinates on the Polybius square, and the coordinates are recorded vertically:

Letter	s	o	m	e	t	e	x	t
Horizontal coordinate	3	4	2	5	4	5	3	4
Vertical coordinate	4	3	3	1	4	1	5	4

Then the coordinates are read row by row:

34  25  45  34  43  31  41  54  

Next, the coordinates are converted into letters using the same square:

Horizontal coordinate	3	2	4	3	4	3	4	5
Vertical coordinate	4	5	5	4	3	1	1	4
Letter	s	w	y	s	o	c	d	u

Thus, after encryption, we get "swysocdu".

=== Method 3 ===
	1	2	3	4	5
1	A	B	C	D	E
2	F	G	H	I/J	K
3	L	M	N	O	P
4	Q	R	S	T	U
5	V	W	X	Y	Z

An advanced variation, which involves the following: the obtained primary ciphertext (result From Method 2) is encrypted again. In this case, it is written out without being split into pairs.

3425453443314154

The resulting sequence of digits is cyclically shifted to the left by one step (an odd number of steps [move 3 to the end]):

4254534433141543

This sequence is again divided into groups of two:

42 54 53 44 33 14 15 43

And is replaced with the final ciphertext according to the table:

Horizontal coordinate	4	5	5	4	3	1	1	4
Vertical coordinate	2	4	3	4	3	4	5	3
Letter	i	u	p	t	n	q	v	o

Thus, after encryption, we get "iuptnqvo".

== Applications ==
=== Telegraphy ===
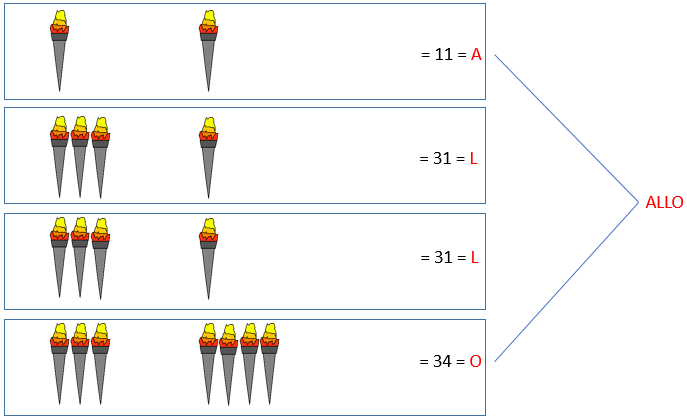
Diagram of a fire signal using the Polybius cipher

In his Histories, Polybius outlines the need for effective signalling in warfare, leading to the development of the square. Previously, fire-signalling was useful only for expected, predetermined messages, with no way to convey novel messages about unexpected events. According to Polybius, in the 4th century BCE, Aeneas Tacticus devised a hydraulic semaphore system consisting of matching vessels with sectioned rods labelled with different messages such as "Heavy Infantry", "Ships", and "Corn". This system was slightly better than the basic fire-signalling, but still lacked the ability to convey any needed message. The Polybius square was used to aid in telegraphy, specifically fire-signalling. To send a message, the sender would initially hold up two torches and wait for the recipient to do the same to signal that they were ready to receive the message. The sender would then hold up the first set of torches on his left side to indicate to the recipient which tablet (or row of the square) was to be consulted. The sender would then raise a set of torches on his right side to indicate which letter on the tablet was intended for the message. Both parties would need the same tablets, a telescope (a tube to narrow view, no real magnification), and torches.

The Polybius square has also been used in the form of the "knock code" to signal messages between cells in prisons by tapping the numbers on pipes or walls. It is said to have been used by nihilist prisoners of the Russian Czars and also by US prisoners of war during the Vietnam War.

Arthur Koestler describes the code being used by political prisoners of Stalin in the 1930s in his anti-totalitarian novel Darkness at Noon. (Koestler had been a prisoner-of-war during the Spanish Civil War.) Indeed, it can be signalled in many simple ways (flashing lamps, blasts of sound, drums, smoke signals) and is much easier to learn than more sophisticated codes like the Morse code. However, it is also somewhat less efficient than more complex codes.

=== Steganography ===
The simple representation also lends itself to steganography. The figures from one to five can be indicated by knots in a string, stitches on a quilt, contiguous letters before a wider space or many other ways.

=== Cryptography ===
The Polybius square is also used as a basic cipher called the Polybius cipher. This cipher is quite insecure by modern standards, as it is a substitution cipher with characters being substituted for pairs of digits, which is easily broken through frequency analysis.

== Adaptations ==
The Polybius square and the Polybius cipher can be combined with other cryptographic methods such as the ADFGVX cipher, Homophonic cipher and more.

== See also ==
- Optical communication – Use of light to convey information
  - Optical telegraph – Tower-based signaling network
- Phryctoria – Means of communication used in Ancient Greece
- Straddling checkerboard – Cryptographic cipher device
- Tap code – Encoding for text messages
- Topics in cryptography
