= Semaphore =

Mechanical apparatus used to send messages

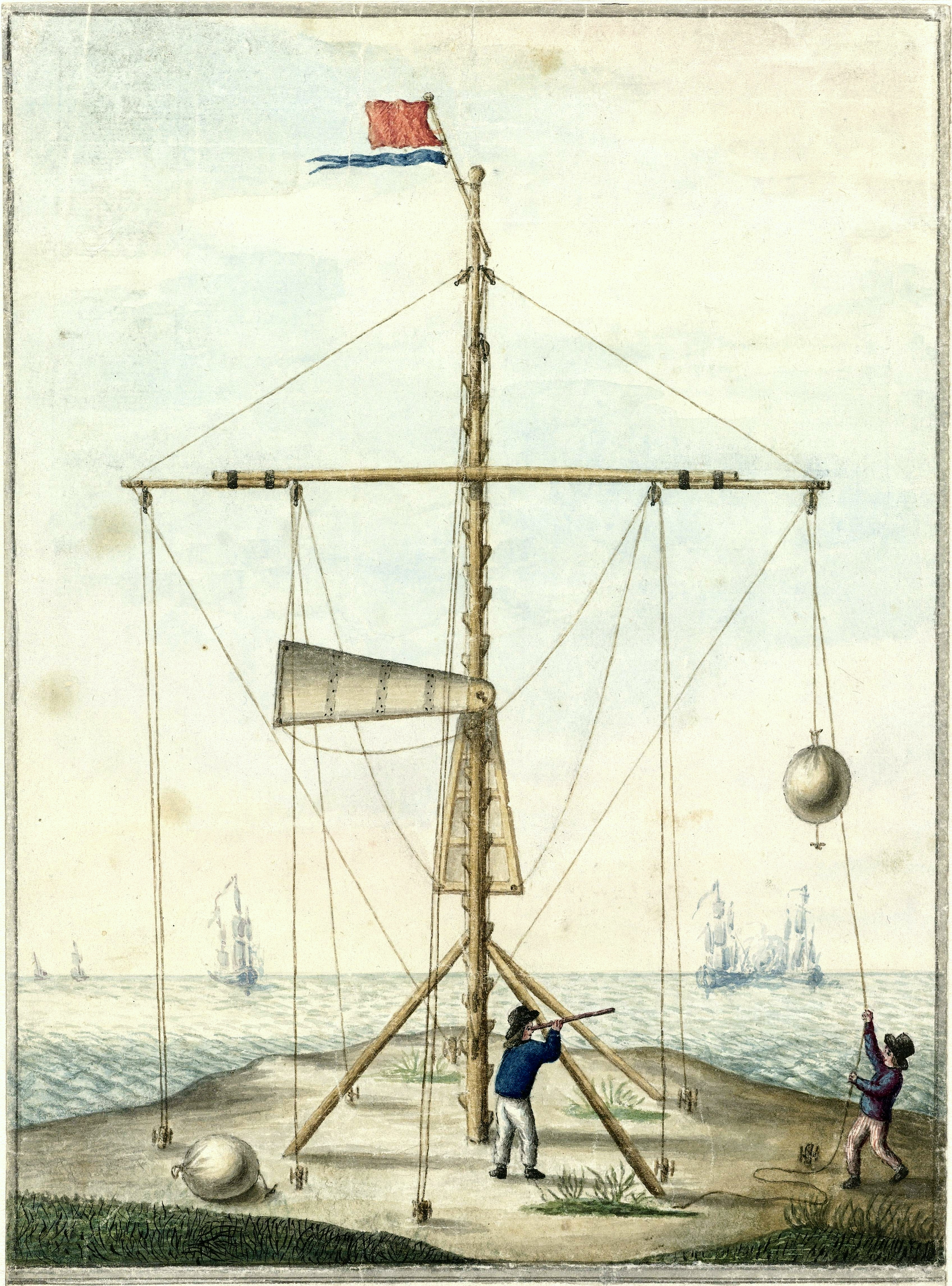
Coastal semaphore using moving arms at Scheveningen, circa 1799

Semaphore (lit. 'apparatus for signalling'; from Ancient Greek σῆμα (sêma) 'mark, sign, token' and Greek -φόρος (-phóros) 'bearer, carrier') is the use of an apparatus to create a visual signal transmitted over distance. A semaphore can be performed with devices including: fire, lights, flags, sunlight, and moving arms. Semaphores can be used for telegraphy when arranged in visually connected networks, or for traffic signalling such as in railway systems, or traffic lights in cities.

== Fire ==
The Phryctoriae were a semaphore system used in Ancient Greece for the transmission of specific prearranged messages. Towers were built on selected mountaintops, so that one tower, the phryctoria, would be visible to the next tower, usually 30 km (20 mi) distant. Flames were lit on one tower, then the next tower would light a flame in succession.

The Byzantine beacon system was a semaphore developed in the 9th century during the Arab–Byzantine wars. The Byzantine Empire used a system of beacons to transmit messages from the border with the Abbasid Caliphate across Asia Minor to the Byzantine capital, Constantinople. The main line of beacons stretched over some 720 km (450 mi) with stations placed from 100 km (60 mi) to 60 km (35 mi). A message could be sent along the line in approximately one hour. A bonfire was set at the first beacon and transmitted down the line to Constantinople.

A smoke signal is one of the oldest forms of semaphore for long-distance communication. The smoke is used to transmit news, signal danger or gather people to a common area.

== Lights ==
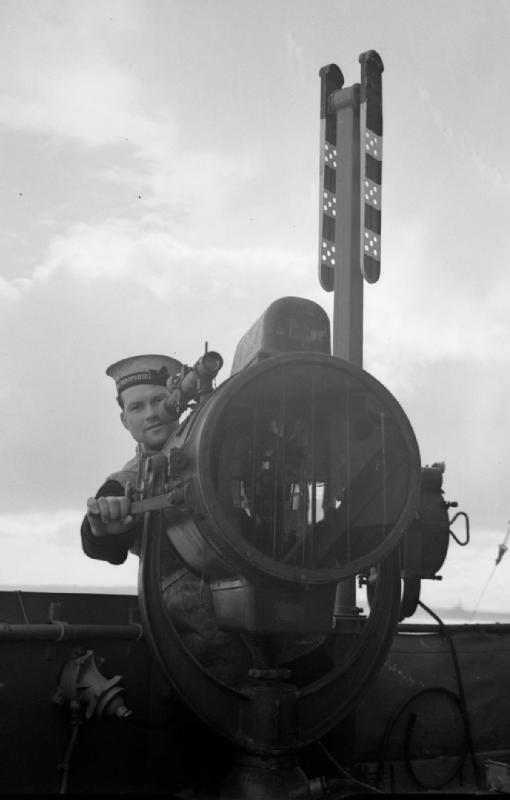
Sailor with signal lamp

A signal lamp is a semaphore system using a visual signaling device, often utilizing Morse code. In the 19th century, the Royal Navy began using signal lamps. In 1867, then Captain, later Vice Admiral, Philip Howard Colomb for the first time began using dots and dashes from a signal lamp.

The modern lighthouse is a semaphore using a tower, building, or another type of structure designed to emit light from a system of lamps and lenses and to serve as a navigational aid for maritime pilots at sea or on inland waterways. Lighthouses mark dangerous coastlines, hazardous shoals, reefs, rocks, and safe entries to harbors; they also assist in aerial navigation. Originally lit by open fires and later candles, the Argand hollow wick lamp and parabolic reflector were introduced in the late 18th century. The source of light is called the "lamp" and the light is concentrated, by the "lens" or "optic". Whale oil was also used with wicks as the source of light. Kerosene became popular in the 1870s and electricity and carbide (acetylene gas) began replacing kerosene around the turn of the 20th century. Carbide was promoted by the Dalén light which automatically lit the lamp at nightfall and extinguished it at dawn. The advent of electrification and automatic lamp changers began to make lighthouse keepers obsolete. Improvements in maritime navigation and safety with satellite navigation systems like the Global Positioning System (GPS) have led to the phasing out of non-automated lighthouses across the world.

== Flags ==
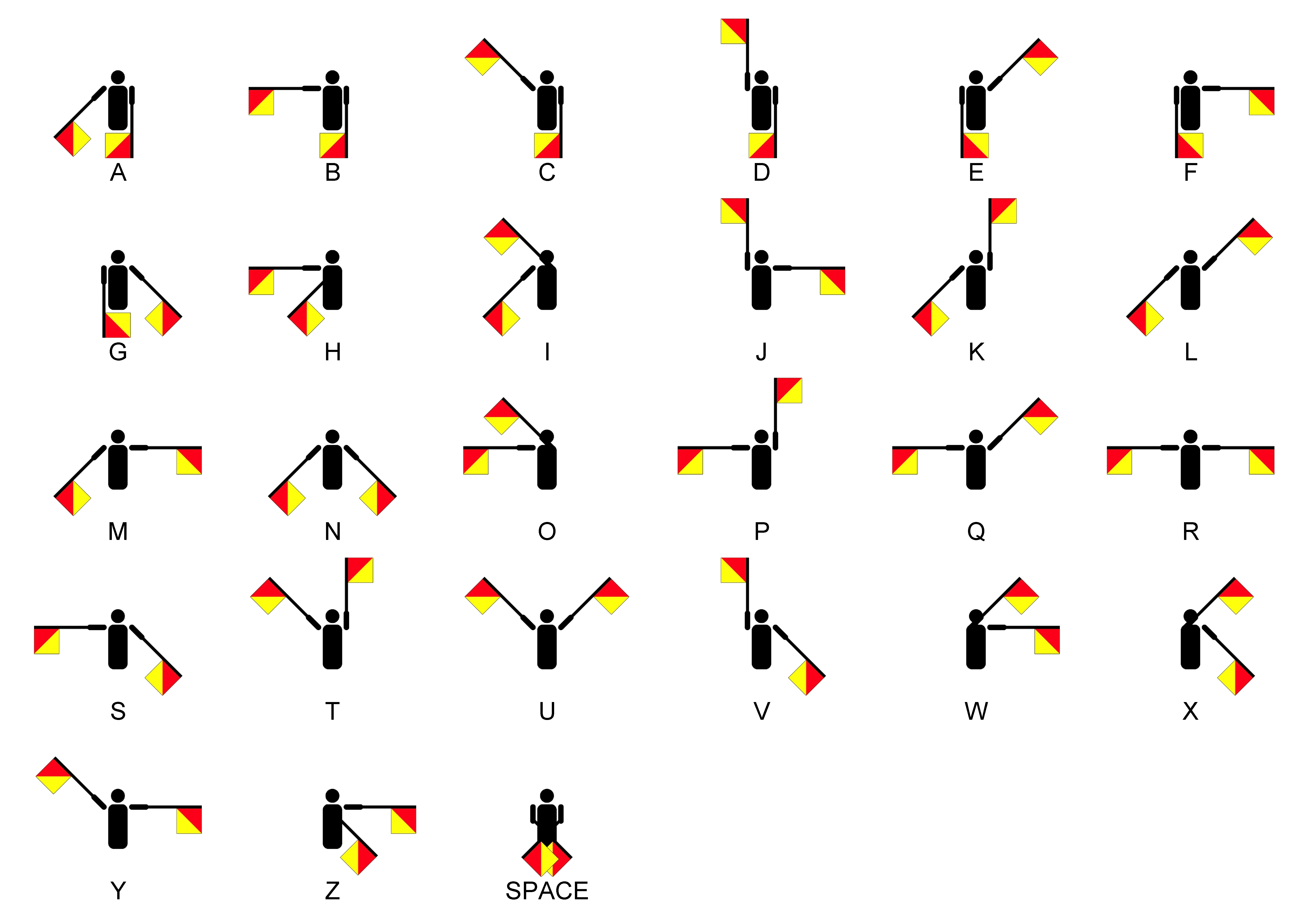
Flag alphabet

A flag semaphore is the telegraphy system conveying information at a distance by means of visual signals with hand-held flags, rods, disks, paddles, or occasionally bare or gloved hands. Information is encoded by the position of the flags. It is still used during underway replenishment at sea and is acceptable for emergency communication in daylight or using lighted wands instead of flags, at night.

International maritime signal flags are a system used by ships for communication at sea, each flag representing a specific letter, numeral, or message in the international maritime signal code. They are brightly coloured and easily distinguishable, serving purposes such as spelling out messages, identifying letters and numbers, signalling distress or requests for assistance and communicating nautical procedures. Standardized by the International Maritime Organization (IMO), these flags ensure global uniformity. They allow maritime professionals a tool for effective and clear communication at sea.

== Sunlight ==
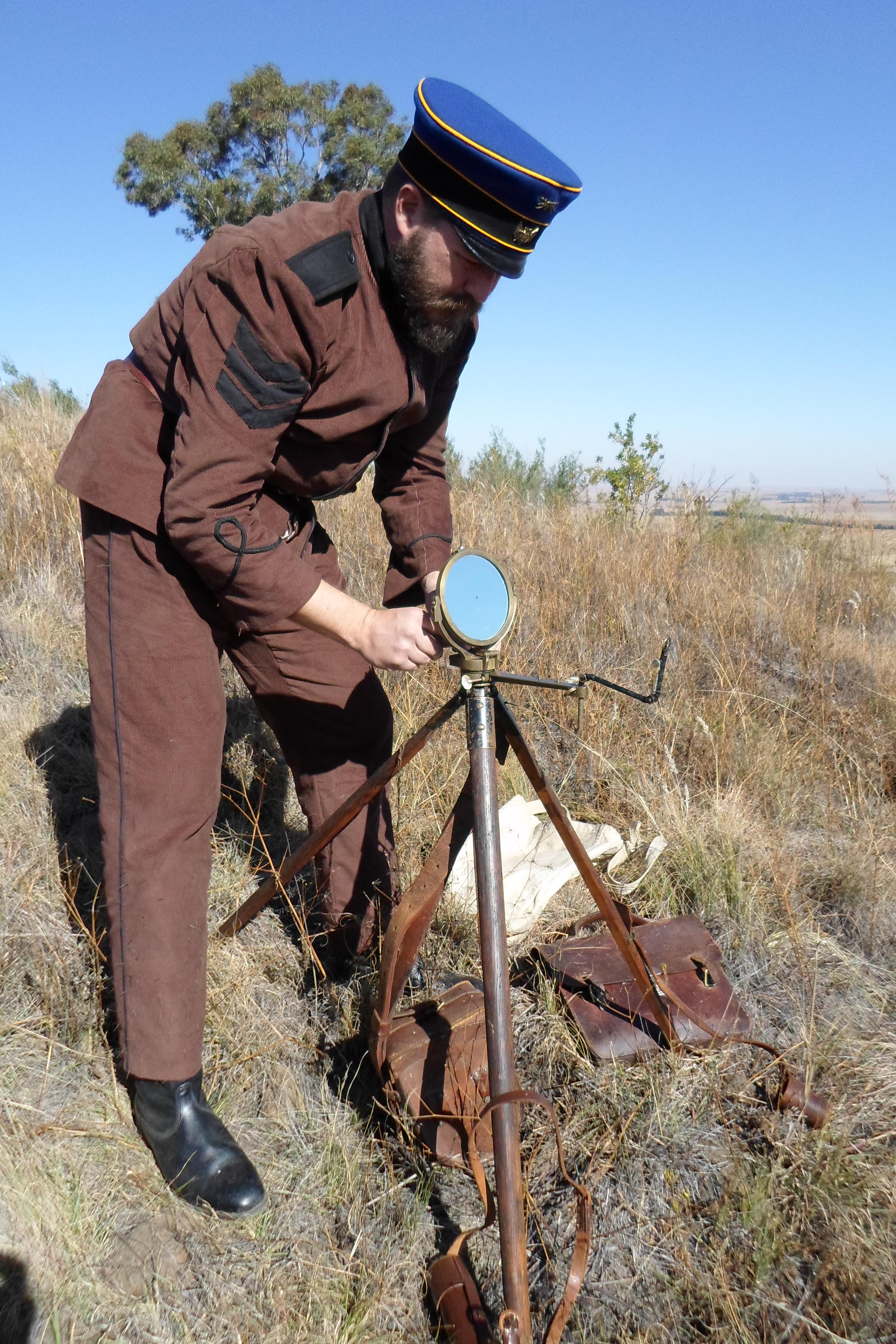
Heliograph

A heliograph is a semaphore that signals by flashes of sunlight using a mirror, often in Morse code. The flashes are produced by momentarily pivoting the mirror or by interrupting the sunlight with a shutter. The heliograph was a simple but effective instrument for instantaneous optical communication over long distances during the late 19th and early 20th century. The main uses were for the military, survey and forest protection work. Heliographs were standard issue in the British and Australian armies until the 1960s and were used by the Pakistani army as late as 1975.

== Moving arms ==
=== Optical telegraph ===
In 1792 Claude Chappe, a clergyman from France, invented a terrestrial semaphore telegraph, which uses pivoted indicator arms and conveys information according to the direction the indicators point and was popular in the late eighteenth to early nineteenth centuries. Relay towers were built with a sightline to each tower at separations of 10–30 km (5–20 mi). On the top of each tower was an apparatus, which uses pivoted indicator arms and conveys information according to the direction the indicators point. An observer at each tower would watch the neighbouring tower through a telescope and when the semaphore arms began to move spelling out a message, they would pass the message on to the next tower. This early form of telegraph system was much more effective and efficient than post riders for conveying a message over long distances. The sightline between relay stations was limited by geography and weather. In addition, the visual communication would not be able to cross large bodies of water.

An example is during the Napoleonic era, stations were constructed to send and receive messages using the coined term Napoleonic semaphore. This form of visual communication was so effective that messages that normally took days to communicate could now be transmitted in mere hours.

=== Cars ===
Some early 20th century cars used moving arms called trafficators to indicate turns before the invention of the modern turn signal. Otherwise drivers used hand signals.

=== Railway signal ===
Railway pivot arms

The railway semaphore signal is one of the earliest forms of fixed railway signals. These signals display their different indications to train drivers by changing the angle of inclination of a pivoted 'arms'. A single arm that pivots is attached to a vertical post and can take one of three positions. The horizontal position indicates stop, the vertical means all clear and the inclined indicates go ahead under control, but expect to stop. Designs have altered over the intervening years and colour light signals have replaced semaphore signals in most countries.

== Hydraulic ==
A hydraulic telegraph can refer to either one of two different semaphore systems. The earliest one was developed in 4th-century BC Greece, while the other was developed in 19th-century AD Britain. The Greek system was deployed in combination with semaphoric fires, while the latter British system was operated purely by hydraulic fluid pressure.

== Decline ==
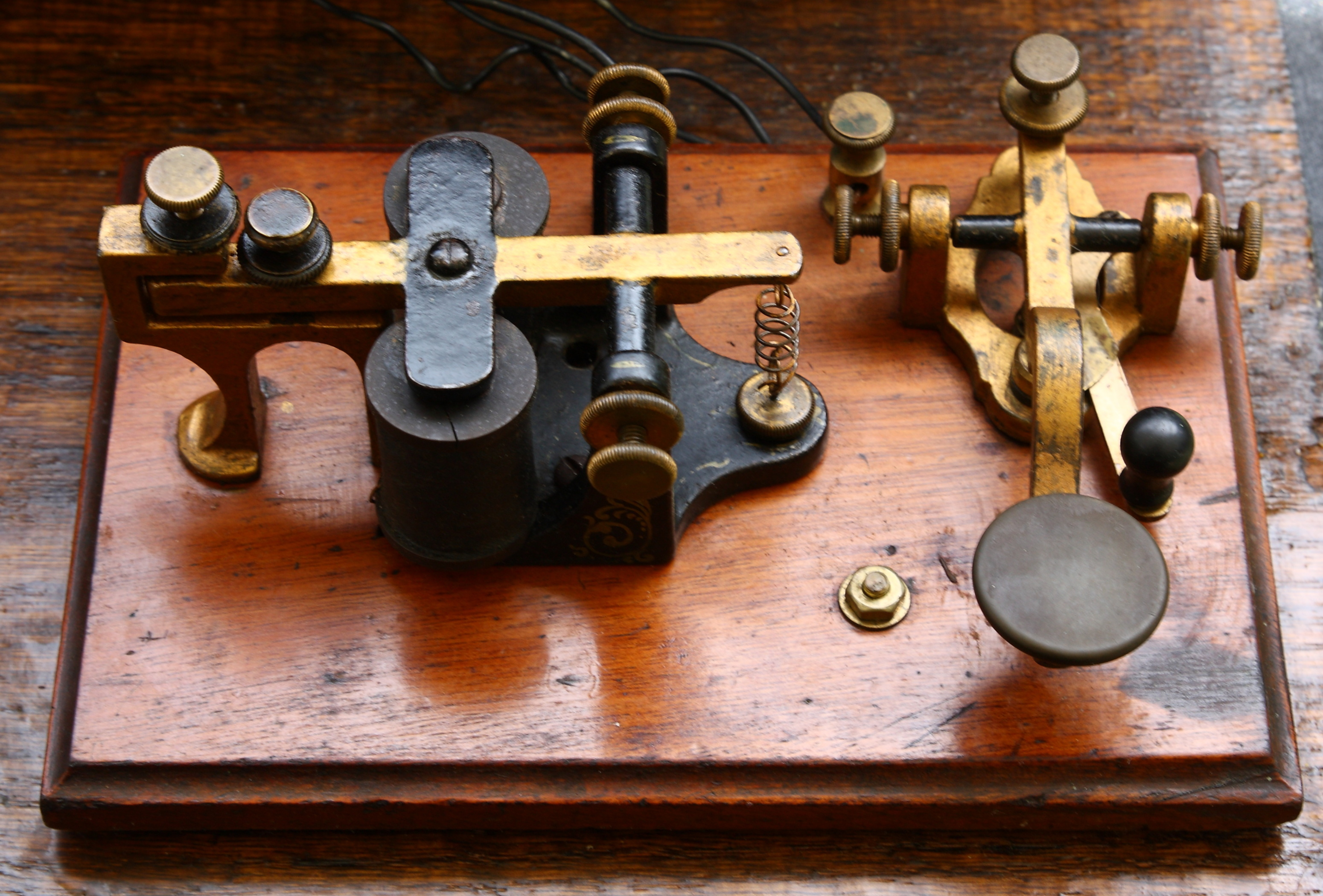
Electric telegraph

In the early 19th century, the electrical telegraph was gradually invented allowing a message to be sent over a wire. In 1835, the American inventor Samuel Morse created a dots and dashes language system representing both letters and numbers, called the Morse code, enabling text-based transmissions. In 1837, the British inventors William Fothergill Cooke and Charles Wheatstone obtained a patent for the first commercially viable telegraph. By the 1840s, with the combination of the telegraph and Morse code, the semaphore system was replaced. The telegraph continued to be used commercially for over 100 years and Morse code is still used by amateur radio enthusiasts. Telecommunication evolved replacing the electric telegraph with the advent of wireless telegraphy, teleprinter, telephone, radio, television, satellite, mobile phone, Internet and broadband.

== See also ==
- Military communications
- Optical communication
