= Leo the Philosopher =

Leo the Philosopher may refer to:

- Leo the Mathematician (c. 790–after 869), Byzantine philosopher
- Leo VI the Wise (866–912), Byzantine emperorer
