= Francis Whishaw =

English civil engineer (1804-1856)

Francis Whishaw (13 July 1804 – October 1856) was an English civil engineer. He was known for his role in the Society of Arts, and as a writer on railways. Later in life he was a promoter of telegraph companies.

== Life ==
Francis Whishaw was born 13 July 1804, the son of John Whishaw, a solicitor. He was articled to James Walker, and found work as a surveyor. He made a survey for a proposed railway line in Cornwall, in 1831, with Richard Thomas. He worked under George Stephenson on the Manchester and Leeds Railway for the second survey of 1835, with George Parker Bidder.

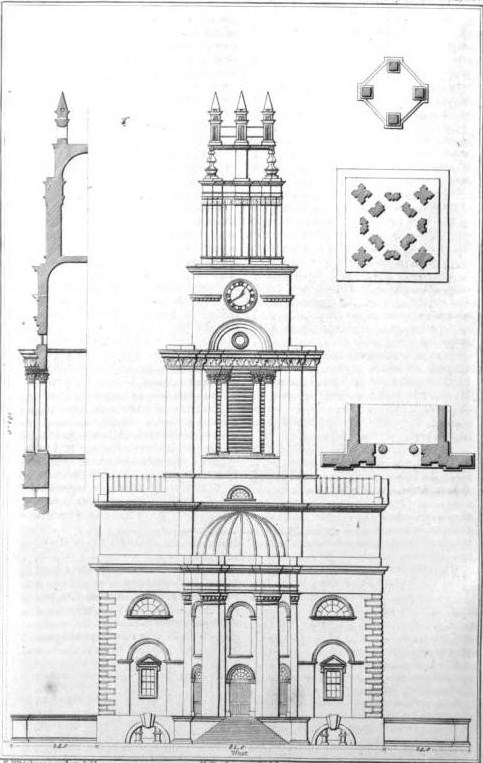
Francis Whishaw (1828), St Anne's Limehouse

In the late 1830s Whishaw was promoting his version of the hydraulic telegraph. In 1839 the Institution of Civil Engineers awarded him a silver Telford medal for his History report on Westminster Bridge; it was a manuscript, of which an abstract was published in the Proceedings of the institute.

Whishaw was recruited by Thomas Webster as the first professional secretary for the Society of Arts, from 1843 to 1845. A small exhibition set up in the Society's rooms in 1844 has been regarded as the starting point for the 1851 Great Exhibition. Possible inspirations were local British trade fairs, the French Industrial Exposition of 1844, and a Zollverein exhibition also in that year. Whishaw's exhibition, which was at his own expense, was planned to be an annual event, but was not, however, a great success. It did prompt W. F. Cooke to push for a national exhibition in 1845. Over some indifference from Prince Albert, president of the Society, Whishaw pulled together a committee including Wentworth Dilke, Francis Fuller, and Robert Stephenson. A second exhibition of 1845 with an enlarged committee was also largely disregarded by manufacturers and the public. In 1847 a more substantial exhibition was held.

Whishaw's March 1845 demonstration of gutta percha to the Society of Arts is credited with stimulating William Siemens to use it for the insulation of cables, based on suggestions of Michael Faraday. His own inventions included the velocentimeter, a watch for timing railway trains, and a gutta percha speaking trumpet, the "telakouphanon", proposed to the British Association.

Whishaw gave an account of the electric telegraph in the London Artisan in 1849. He was one of those exhibiting gutta percha products at the Great Exhibition in 1851, with a dozen other inventions.

In the years before his death Whishaw had suffered from reduced health, and had complained of pains in the head, and experience occasional brief memory loss. In October 1856 Francis Whishaw was found late evening by a policeman in a partially conscious state, sometime after leaving his residence to attend church in Kentish Town. He was taken to a doctor, and then to the a workhouse infirmary, where he died. (Note: The date of death is given in Minutes of Proceedings (1857), p. 150) as 6 October, whereas Laxton (1856, p. 365) gives 5 October.) The post mortem gave a verdict of natural apoplexy.

As a civil and mechanical engineer Francis Whishaw was a man of sound attainments and great acquirements, of a highly original and suggestive train of mind, fostered by careful study and experiment, and tempered by sound judgment [..] In personal character [he] was esteemed for great parts and probity, but his integrity was so unflinching that it earned him many enemies. Independent in his bearing, confident in his integrity, he was a fierce foe to quackery in science and quacks in morals; and as this was marked by some asperity of character, the quacks at length got the better of him [...] it was easy to represent that Whishaw was uncertain in his temper, unstable in his disposition, and at length that he was an impracticable man; though he was undoubtedly a good servant to those who employed him, a good master to those under him, and a good colleague to those who acted with him.

— The Civil Engineer and Architect's Journal (1856)

== Works ==
- Whishaw, Francis (1837). Analysis of Railways: Consisting of a Series of Reports of the Twelve Hundred Miles of Projected Railways in England and Wales ... John Weale.
- Whishaw, Francis (1842) [1840]. The Railways of Great Britain and Ireland practically described and illustrated (2nd ed.).
- Whishaw, Francis (1840). Report of the Railway Communication with Scotland: [...] report on the proposed Lancaster and Penrith railway.
- Whishaw, F. (1838). "History and Construction of Westminster Bridge, Accompanied with Detailed Drawings". Minutes of the Proceedings. 1 (1838). Institute of Civil Engineers: 44–46. doi:10.1680/imotp.1838.24813.
- Whishaw, F. (1839). "Observations on the Present Mode of Executing Railways, with Suggestions for a More Economical, Yet Equally Efficient System, of Both Executing and Working Them". Minutes of the Proceedings. 1 (1839). Institute of Civil Engineers: 53. doi:10.1680/imotp.1839.24848.

== Notes and references ==
=== Sources ===
- "Obituary of Francis Whishaw, 1804–1856". Minutes of the Proceedings. 16 (1857). Institution of Civil Engineers: 143–150. 1857. doi:10.1680/imotp.1857.23802.
- Goodale, Ernest W. (17 November 1950). "Celebrating a Great Centenary". Journal of the Royal Society of Arts. 99 (4834). Royal Society for the Encouragement of Arts, Manufactures and Commerce: 7–16. JSTOR 41364278.
- Laxton, William (1856). "Francis Whishaw, M. Inst. C.E." The Civil Engineer and Architect's Journal. 19: 365–366.
