= Phryctoria =

Means of communication used in Ancient Greece

Phryctoria (Greek: φρυκτωρία) was a semaphore system used in Ancient Greece. The phryctoriae were towers built on selected mountaintops so that one tower (phryctoria) would be visible to the next tower (usually 20 miles away). The towers were used for the transmission of a specific prearranged message. One tower would light its flame, the next tower would see the fire, and light its own.

== Terms ==
A beacon was called phryctos (φρυκτός), with the plural form phryctoi (φρυκτοί).

Phryctoros (Φρυκτωρός) referred to the person in charge of beacon signaling, while Paraphryktoreuomenos (Παραφρυκτωρευόμενος, "one who sends improper beacon signals") described someone who abuses this duty by transmitting false or misleading signals, in ways that benefit the enemy. As described by Lysias, one such man was caught in Sicily by Lamachus while secretly signaling to the enemy and was executed for his betrayal.

== Use of beacons in Ancient Greece ==
In the Iliad, Homer describes the practice of beacons lit atop a city at sunset after a day of battle, blazing high into the sky so that people far away, especially those at sea, might see them and come to help defend the city. He compares these fires to the blazing light around Achilles head, sent by the goddess Athena, which shines toward heaven and terrifies the Trojans.

In Aeschylus tragedy Agamemnon, a slave watchman character learns the news of Troy's fall from Mycenae by carefully watching a fire beacon.

In Herodotus account, beacons on Sciathus were used to alert the Greek forces at Artemisium that the Persian fleet had arrived and captured some Greek ships. This warning allowed the Greeks to respond by changing their anchorage and adjusting their defensive positions. Herodotus also mentions that during Mardonios expedition against Athens, he intended to signal King Xerxes in Sardis that he had taken Athens, using a line of beacons across the islands.

Thucydides wrote that during the Peloponnesian War, the Peloponnesians who were in Corcyra were informed by night-time beacon signals of the approach of sixty Athenian vessels from Lefkada. While when Cnemus attacked Salamis Island, the Salaminians informed the Athenians and asked for help by beacon-fires.

Greek authors note that in the Persian Empire, there were couriers, watchmen, messengers and signal fires. These systems, particularly the chain of signal fires stretching from the empire's farthest reaches to Susa and Ecbatana, were so efficient that the king could learn about events across Asia on the very same day they occurred.

Philip V of Macedon during the First Macedonian War employed a network of beacon fires to monitor enemy movements and coordinate responses across distant regions. He sent men into Phocis, Euboea and Peparethos to select elevated positions suitable for lighting the beacons, while he himself stationed at Tisaeus, a peak of great height, to observe the signals. The purpose of this system was to receive instant notice of any hostile activity so that Philip could respond quickly to threats. At the city of Oreus, however, the system failed to function optimally, although the beacons gave Philip warning, they were lit too late due to the treachery of Plator, the garrison commandant.

Pliny the Elder notes that in Asian part of the Roman Empire, people erected beacons to warn against pirates.

The Byzantine encyclopedia Suda writes that people raised beacons above their walls to communicate with nearby allies and neighbors. When they saw an enemy approaching, they used these lights to warn others to prepare for defense, while the arrival of friendly forces was signaled to show that there was no need for alarm. The meaning depended on how the beacons were handled: a steady, unmoving light indicated friends, while a moving light signaled enemies.

Polybius in his work explained that fire signals were extremely useful in war because they allowed distant parties to learn quickly what was happening; early beacons, however, were of little use, as they could only convey a few prearranged messages and could not communicate unexpected events. He then describes an improved method proposed by Aeneas Tacticus, in which two identical earthenware vessels are filled with water, each containing a floating cork which supports a rod divided into sections labeled with common wartime events. Spigots at the base of the vessels allow water to escape at the same rate, so that when a sender raises a torch and lets the water flow until the corresponding label reaches the mouth of the vessel at which point the torch is lowered, the receiver can interpret the message (see hydraulic semaphore system). While this method was a slight improvement over simple beacons, it remained limited and imprecise, as it could not foresee all contingencies or convey exact details. Polybius then introduces a more advanced torch-and-alphabet system, which allows any message to be transmitted clearly, and emphasizes that such methods require practice and habit to be effective (see section below and the Polybius square).

Polybius also wrote that Pyrsourídas (Πυρσουρίδας) were beacons established by Perseus of Macedonia across the entire region, enabling him to receive rapid reports about events in different locations. Suda notes that this system was similar to the later Byzantine beacon network.

== Phryctoriae and Pyrseia ==
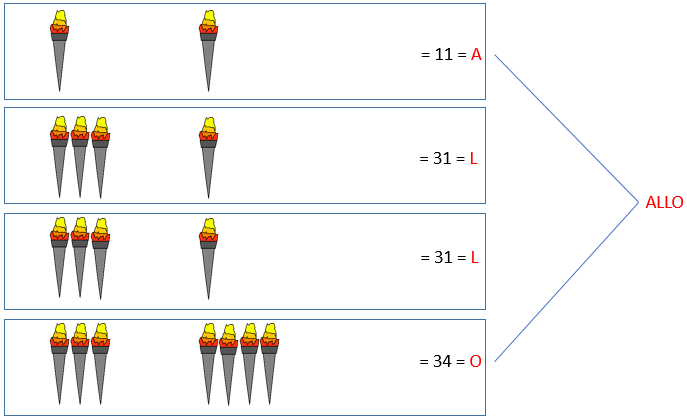
Diagram of a fire signal using the Polybius cipher

Ιn the 2nd century BC, the Greek engineers from Alexandria, Cleoxenes (Greek: Κλεόξενος) and Democletus (Greek: Δημόκλειτος) invented the pyrseia (Greek: πυρσεία). Πυρσεία from πυρσός which means torch. The letters of the Greek alphabet were listed on a table. Each letter corresponded to a row and a column on the table. By using two groups of torches (five torches in every group), the left indicating the row and the right the column of the table, they could send a message by defining a specific letter through combination of light torches.

The coding system was as follows:

	1	2	3	4	5
1	Α	Β	Γ	Δ	Ε
2	Ζ	Η	Θ	Ι	Κ
3	Λ	Μ	Ν	Ξ	Ο
4	Π	Ρ	Σ	Τ	Υ
5	Φ	Χ	Ψ	Ω	

When they wanted to send the letter O (omicron), they fired five torches on the right set and three torches on the left set.

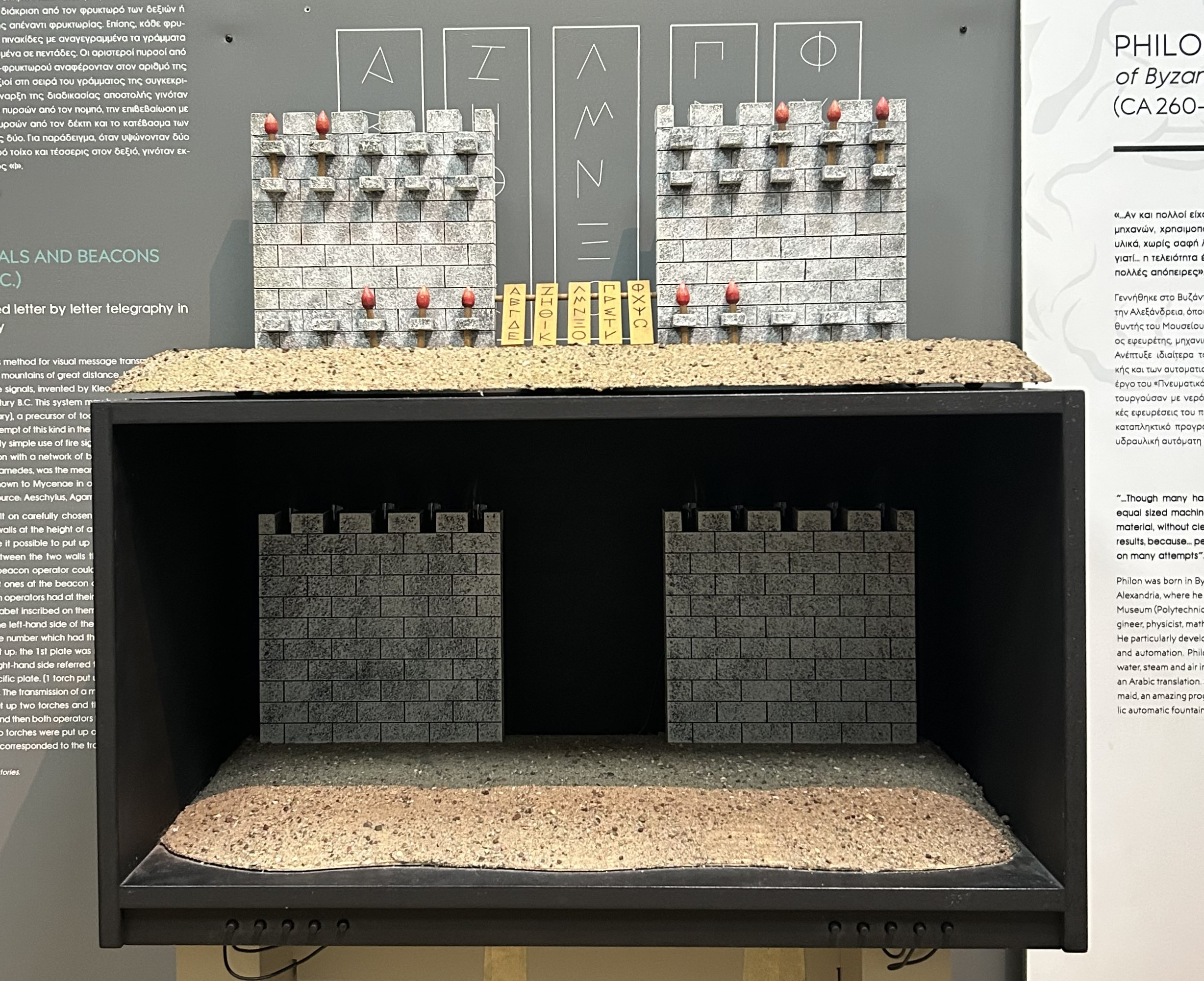
A small reconstruction of fire signals and beacons in Kotsanas Museum of Ancient Greek Technology, Athens, Greece.

Polybius writes that he later perfected the system (see Polybius square).

== See also ==
- Byzantine beacon system
- Optical communication
- Polybius square
- Greek hydraulic semaphore system
