= Pylai (Bithynia) =

Pylai or Pylae (Greek: Πύλαι) was an ancient city in Bithynia, on the coast of Asia Minor. It was situated in the Astacus Gulf, between Helenopolis and the Poseidion akron, in modern day Yalova.

== History ==
=== Antiquity ===
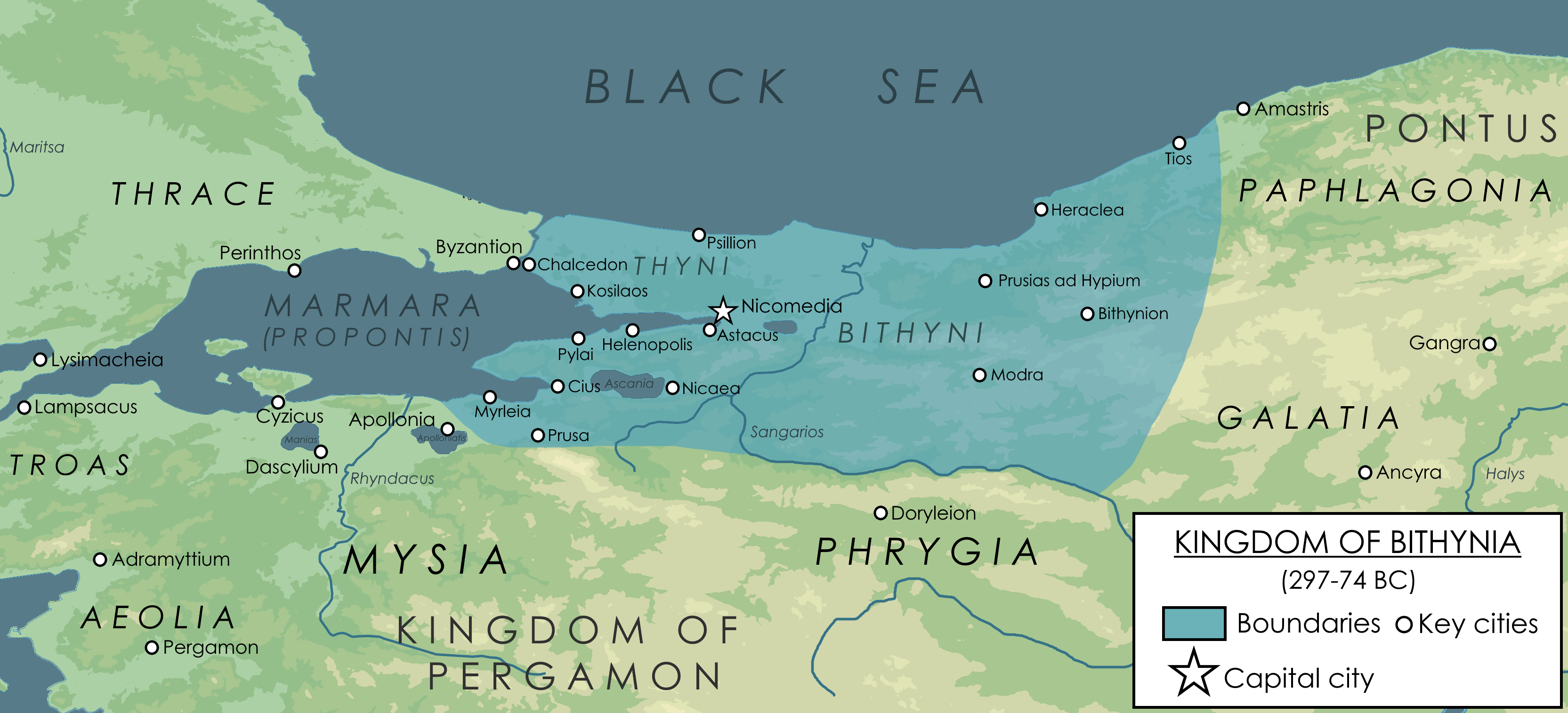
Map of the Hellenistic Kingdom of Bithynia which includes Pylai

Pylai is mentioned in the Natural History of Pliny the Elder, and is included in the Tabula Peutingeriana. A series of funerary inscriptions have also been found in the area.

=== Early Middle Ages ===
The Byzantine beacon system of which Pylai was part of through Mount Mokilos

The town gained notability in the Byzantine period, as emperors would disembark at Pylai for their journeys and expeditions from Constantinople to Anatolia, while ceremonies were held for their arrival. It possessed imperial estates, hotels for the merchants and "specialized in the export of swine, cattle, horses, and donkeys to Constantinople". The town was also part of the imperial beacon system. During the reign of Justin II, the monastery of the Katharoi was founded by the Cubicularius Narses near Pylai.

The Magister Militum and future Emperor Zeno fled to the town before reaching Chalcedon in 469/70. Heraclius passed from the town in 620/1 during his campaign against Persia. A group of Arabs under Mardasan raided Pylai in 716/7, during the Second Arab Siege of Constantinople, but they were defeated and repulsed by the Byzantines. On 17 July 797, Constantine VI passed from Pylai while unsuccessfully attempting to flee from the officers of his mother Irene.

=== High and Late Middle Ages ===
During the Seljuk invasions of Anatolia, Nikephoros Botaneiates let the soldiers of Suleiman enter multiple coastal settlements, including Pylai, in exchange for assistance in his rebellion. This led to the capture of the city by the Seljuks, until they were repulsed from the Anatolian coastlines during the reign of Alexios I Komnenos. In 1146 Manuel I Komnenos transported the population of Philomelion to Pylai, which he rebuilt and made into a fortress.

After the Fourth Crusade, in the Partitio terrarum imperii Romaniae, the town was given to the Latin Emperor Baldwin I. It became an important port for the Empire of Nicaea and remained a fortified Byzantine town until the 1300s, when Ottoman attacks intensified, threatening and forcing much of the population (anachronistically referred to as Bebryces by George Pachymeres) to abandon Pylai and seek refuge in the Princes' Islands.

== Bibliography ==
- Corsten, Thomas (1987). Die Inschriften von Apameia (Bithynien) und Pylai. Inschriften griechischer Städte aus Kleinasien. Vol. 32. ISBN 3-7749-2261-6.
- Foss, Clive (1991). "Pylai". In Kazhdan, Alexander (ed.). The Oxford Dictionary of Byzantium. Oxford and New York: Oxford University Press. ISBN 978-0-19-504652-6.
- The Chronicle of Theophanes Confessor: Byzantine and Near Eastern History AD 284-813 (PDF). Translated by Mango, Cyril; Scott, Roger. Clarendon Press. 1997. ISBN 0-19-822568-7.
- "Olba XXI". Mersin University Publications of the Research Center of Cilician Archaeology. Vol. XXI. Kaam. 2013. ISSN 1301-7667.
- Constantine Porphyrogennetos: The Book Of Ceremonies. Translated by Moffatt, Ann; Tall, Maxeme. Brill. 2017. ISBN 978-9004344921.
- Pliny Natural History II Libri III-VII. Translated by Rackham. Harvard University Press. 1967.
- Ramsay, William (1890). The Historical Geography of Asia Minor. Royal Geographical Society.
- Tafel, Gottlieb Lukas Friedrich; Thomas, Georg Martin (1856). Urkunden zur älteren Handels- und Staatsgeschichte der Republik Venedig, mit besonderer Beziehung auf Byzanz und die Levante: Vom neunten bis zum Ausgang des fünfzehnten Jahrhunderts. 1. Theil (814–1205). Vienna: Kaiserlich-Königliche Hof-und Staatsdruckerei.
- Gorges Pachymérès Relations Historiques. Translated by Vitalien, Laurent; Failler, Albert. 1984. ISBN 2-251-32230-2.
- Vryonis, Speros (1971). The Decline of Medieval Hellenism in Asia Minor and the Process of Islamization from the Eleventh through the Fifteenth Century. University of California Press. ISBN 0-520-01597-5.
