= Leo the Mathematician =

Byzantine philosopher, mathematician and logician

Leo the Mathematician, the Grammarian or the Philosopher (Ancient Greek: Λέων ὁ Μαθηματικός or ὁ Φιλόσοφος, Léōn ho Mathēmatikós or ho Philósophos; c. 790 – after January 9, 869) was a Byzantine philosopher and logician associated with the Macedonian Renaissance and the end of the Second Byzantine Iconoclasm. His only preserved writings are some notes contained in manuscripts of Plato's dialogues. He has been called a "true Renaissance man" and "the cleverest man in Byzantium in the 9th century". He was archbishop of Thessalonica and later became the head of the Magnaura School of philosophy in Constantinople, where he taught Aristotelian logic.

== Life ==
Leo was born in Thessaly, a cousin of the Patriarch of Constantinople, John the Grammarian. Little is known about his early life. (Note: There are speculations that Leo was of Armenian ancestry, but these claims have been challenged. Leo, in fact, identified himself as a "Hellene". There is a tendency amongst certain Byzantinists to propose an "Armenian" ancestry for certain Byzantine individuals and/or families with an obscure heritage as a "convenient solution", even if the evidence is flimsy, non-existent or completely fictional.) In his youth he was educated at Constantinople, but found higher education options limited in the city and thus travelled to the monasteries of Andros, where he could obtain rare manuscripts and was taught mathematics by an old monk. He originally taught privately in obscurity in Constantinople. The story goes that when one of his students was captured during the Byzantine–Arab Wars, the Caliph al-Mamun was so impressed by his knowledge of mathematics, providing proofs that his own scholars were unable to complete, and predictive abilities that he offered Leo great riches to come to Baghdad. Leo took the letter from the caliph to the Byzantine emperor Theophilos, who, impressed by his international repute, conferred on him a school (ekpaideutērion) in either the Magnaura or the church of the Forty Martyrs.

In the version of the story recorded by Theophanes Continuatus, the caliph, upon receiving Leo's letter of refusal, sent a letter requesting answers to some difficult questions of geometry and astrology, which Leo obliged. Al-Mamun then offered two thousands pounds of gold and a perpetual peace to Theophilos, if only he could borrow Leo's services briefly; the request was declined. The emperor then honoured Leo by having John the Grammarian consecrate him metropolitan of Thessalonica, which post he held from the spring of 840 to 843. There is a discrepancy in this account, however, in that the caliph died in 833. It has been suggested that either the connection between the caliph's final letter and Leo's appointment as metropolitan is in error, or the caliph in question was actually al-Mutasim. This latter option squares with the account of Symeon the Logothete, who makes Leo teach at the Magnaura from late 838 to early 840 and was paid handsomely.

Leo, an iconoclast sometimes accused of paganism, lost his metropolitancy with the end of the Iconoclasm in 843. Despite this, he delivered a sermon favourable of icons within months of Theophilos' death. Around 855, Leo was appointed at the head of a newly established Magnaura School by Bardas. He was renowned for his philosophical, mathematical, medical, scientific, literary, philological, seismological, astronomic, and astrological learning, and was patronised by Theoktistos and befriended by Photios I of Constantinople. Cyril was his student. Leo has been credited with a system of beacons (an optical telegraph) stretching across Asia Minor from Cilicia to Constantinople, which gave advance warning of Arab raids, as well as diplomatic communication. Leo also invented several automata, such as trees with moving birds, roaring lions, and a levitating imperial throne. The throne was in operation a century later, when Liutprand of Cremona witnessed it during his visit to Constantinople.

== Works ==
Most of Leo's writings have been lost. He wrote book-length works, poems, and many epigrams, and was also a compiler, who brought together a wide range of philosophical, medical, and astronomic texts. His library can at least partially be reconstructed: Archimedes, Euclid, Plato, Paul of Alexandria, Theon of Alexandria, Proclus, Porphyry, Apollonius of Perga, the lost Mechanics of Quirinus and Marcellus, and possibly Thucydides. He composed his own medical encyclopaedia. Later Byzantine scholars sometimes confused Leo with the scholar Leo Choirosphaktes and the emperor Leo VI the Wise, and ascribe to him oracles.

== Primary sources ==
Recent years have seen the first translations into English of a number of primary sources about Leo and his times.

- Featherstone, Jeffrey Michael and Signes-Codoñer, Juan (translators). Chronographiae quae Theophanis Continuati nomine fertur Libri I-IV (Chronicle of Theophanes Continuatus Books I-IV, comprising the reigns of Leo V the Armenian to Michael III), Berlin, Boston: De Gruyter, 2015.
- Kaldellis, A. (trans.). On the reigns of the emperors (the history of Joseph Genesios), Canberra: Australian Association for Byzantine Studies; Byzantina Australiensia 11, 1998.
- Ševčenko, Ihor (trans.). Chronographiae quae Theophanis Continuati nomine fertur Liber quo Vita Basilii Imperatoris amplectitur (Chronicle of Theophanes Continuatus comprising the Life of Basil I), Berlin: De Gruyter, 2011.
- Wahlgren, Staffan (translator, writer of introduction and commentary). The Chronicle of the Logothete, Liverpool University Press; Translated Texts for Byzantinists, vol. 7, 2019.
- Wortley, John (trans.). A synopsis of Byzantine history, 811-1057 (the history of John Scylitzes, active 1081), Cambridge University Press, 2010.

== Notes ==
=== Sources ===
- Bromige, Toby (2023). Armenians in the Byzantine Empire: Identity, Assimilation and Alienation from 867 to 1098. I.B. Tauris. ISBN 978-0-7556-4242-7.
- Bryer, Anthony (1980). The Empire of Trebizond and the Pontos. Variorum Reprints. ISBN 978-0-86078-062-5.
- Casas Olea, Matilde (2023). "Philosophical References and Compositional Strategies in Leo the Philosopher's Poem Job, or, On Indifference to Grief and on Patience". Konštantínove listy/Constantine's Letters. 16 (2): 147–162. doi:10.17846/CL.2023.16.2.147-162.
- * Kaldellis, Anthony (2019). Romanland: Ethnicity and Empire in Byzantium. Harvard University Press. ISBN 978-0-674-98651-0.
