= Byzantine beacon system =

System of beacons stretching across Anatolia

Course of the main beacon line between Constantinople and Loulon on the Cilician Gates

In the 9th century, during the Arab–Byzantine wars, the Byzantine Empire used a semaphore system of beacons to transmit messages from the border with the Abbasid Caliphate across Asia Minor to the Byzantine capital, Constantinople.

According to Byzantine sources (Constantine Porphyrogenitus, Theophanes Continuatus and Symeon Magister), the line of beacons began with the fortress of Loulon, on the northern exit of the Cilician Gates, and continued with Mt. Argaios (identified mostly with Keçikalesı on Hasan Dağı, but also with Erciyes Dağı near Caesarea), Mt. Samos or Isamos (unidentified, probably north of Lake Tatta), the fortress of Aigilon (unidentified, probably south of Dorylaion), Mt. Mamas (unidentified, Constantine Porphyrogenitus has Mysian Olympus instead), Mt. Kyrizos (somewhere between Lake Ascania and the Gulf of Kios, possibly Katerlı Dağı according to W. M. Ramsay), Mt. Mokilos above Pylai on the southern shore of the Gulf of Nicomedia (identified by Ramsay with Samanlı Dağı), Mt. Saint Auxentius (modern Kayış Dağı) south-east of Chalcedon (modern Kadıköy) and the lighthouse (Pharos) of the Great Palace in Constantinople. This main line was complemented by secondary branches that transmitted the messages to other locations, as well as along the frontier itself.

The main line of beacons stretched over some 720 km (450 mi). In the open spaces of central Asia Minor, the stations were placed over 97 km (60 mi) apart, while in Bithynia, with its more broken terrain, the intervals were reduced to ca. 56 km (35 mi). Based on modern experiments, a message could be transmitted the entire length of the line within an hour. The system was reportedly devised in the reign of Emperor Theophilos (ruled 829–842) by Leo the Mathematician, and functioned through two identical water clocks placed at the two terminal stations, Loulon and the Lighthouse. Different messages were assigned to each of twelve hours, so that the lighting of a bonfire (see fire beacon) on the first beacon on a particular hour signalled a specific event and was transmitted down the line to Constantinople.

According to some of the Byzantine chroniclers, the system was disbanded by Theophilos' son and successor, Michael III (r. 842–867) because the sight of the lit beacons and the news of an Arab invasion threatened to distract the people and spoil his performance as one of the charioteers in the Hippodrome races. This tale is usually dismissed by modern scholars as part of a deliberate propaganda campaign by 10th-century sources keen to blacken Michael's image in favour of the succeeding Macedonian dynasty. If indeed there is some element of truth in this report, it may reflect a cutting-back or modification of the system, perhaps due to the receding of the Arab danger during Michael III's reign. The surviving portions of the system or a new but similar one seem to have been reactivated under Manuel I Komnenos (r. 1143–1180).

== See also ==
- Beacons of Gondor
- New Jersey beacon system
- Heliograph
- Hydraulic telegraph
- Optical communication
- Phryctoria
- Signal lamp

== General and cited sources ==
- Haldon, John F. (1990). Constantine Porphyrogenitus: Three treatises on imperial military expeditions. Vienna: Verlag der Österreichischen Akademie der Wissenschaften. ISBN 3700117787.
- Foss, Clive (1991). "Beacon". In Kazhdan, Alexander (ed.). The Oxford Dictionary of Byzantium. Oxford and New York: Oxford University Press. pp. 273–274. ISBN 0-19-504652-8.
- Toynbee, Arnold (1973). Constantine Porphyrogenitus and His World. London and New York: Oxford University Press. ISBN 0-19-215253-X.
