= Hydraulic telegraph =

Semaphore systems using water-based mechanisms

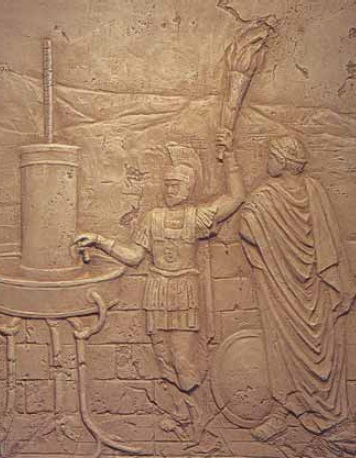
An ancient hydraulic telegraph being used by Aeneas to send a message.

A hydraulic telegraph (Greek: υδραυλικός τηλέγραφος) refers to two different semaphore systems involving the use of water-based mechanisms as a telegraph. The earliest one was developed in 4th-century BC Greece, while the other was developed in 19th-century AD Britain. The Greek system was deployed in combination with semaphoric fires, while the latter British system was operated purely by hydraulic fluid pressure.

Although both systems employed water in their sending and receiver devices, their transmission media were completely different. The ancient Greek system transmitted its semaphoric information to the receiver visually, which limited its use to line-of-sight distances in good visibility weather conditions only. The 19th-century British system used water-filled pipes to effect changes to the water level in the receiver unit (similar to a transparent water-filled flexible tube used as a level indicator), thus limiting its range to the hydraulic pressure that could be generated at the transmitter's device.

While the Greek device was extremely limited in the codes (and hence the information) it could convey, the British device was never deployed in operation other than for very short-distance demonstrations. Although the British device could be used in any visibility within its range of operation, it could not work in freezing temperatures without additional infrastructure to heat the pipes. This contributed to its impracticality.

== Greek hydraulic semaphore system ==
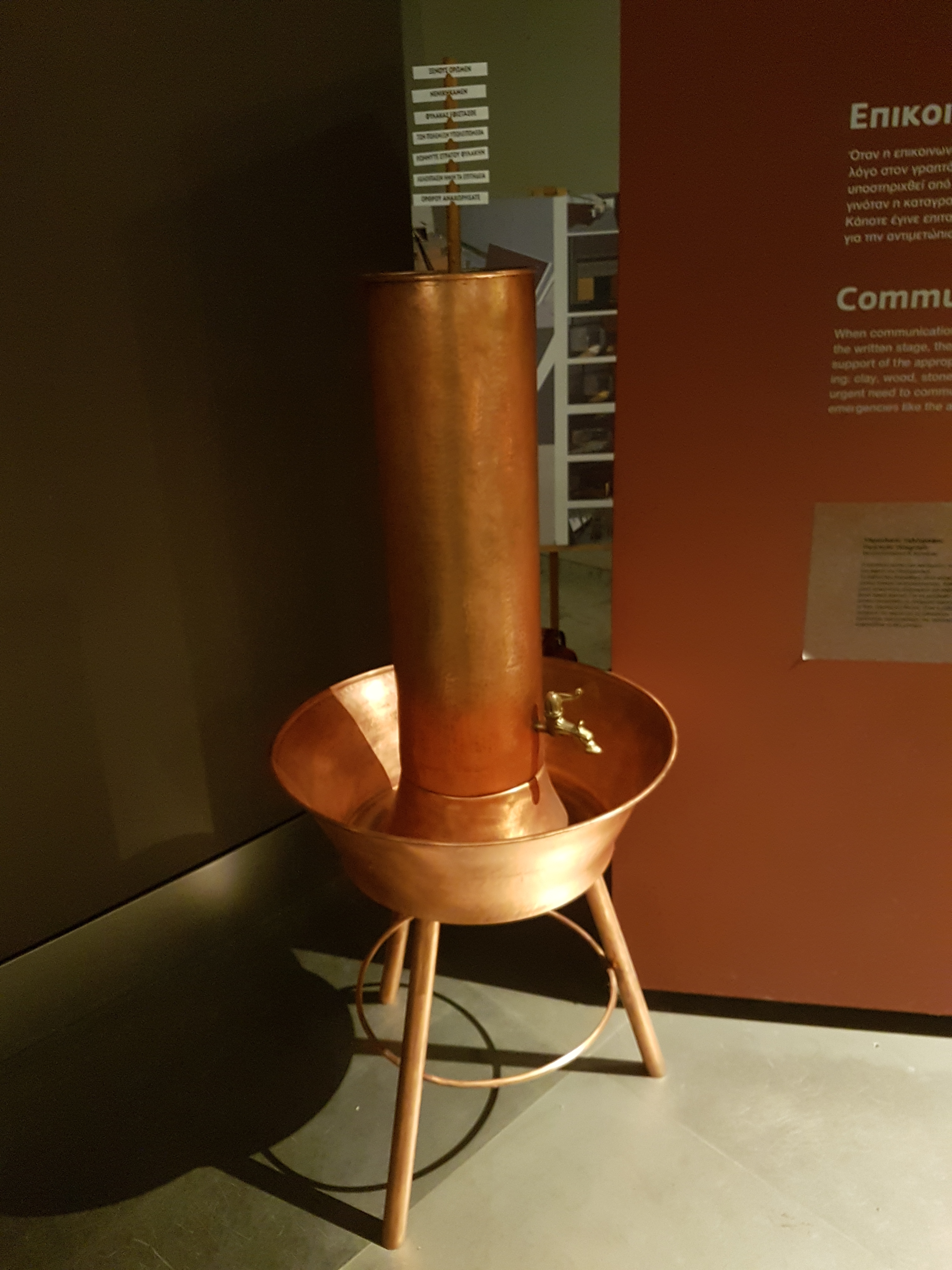
Reconstruction, Thessaloniki Science Center and Technology Museum

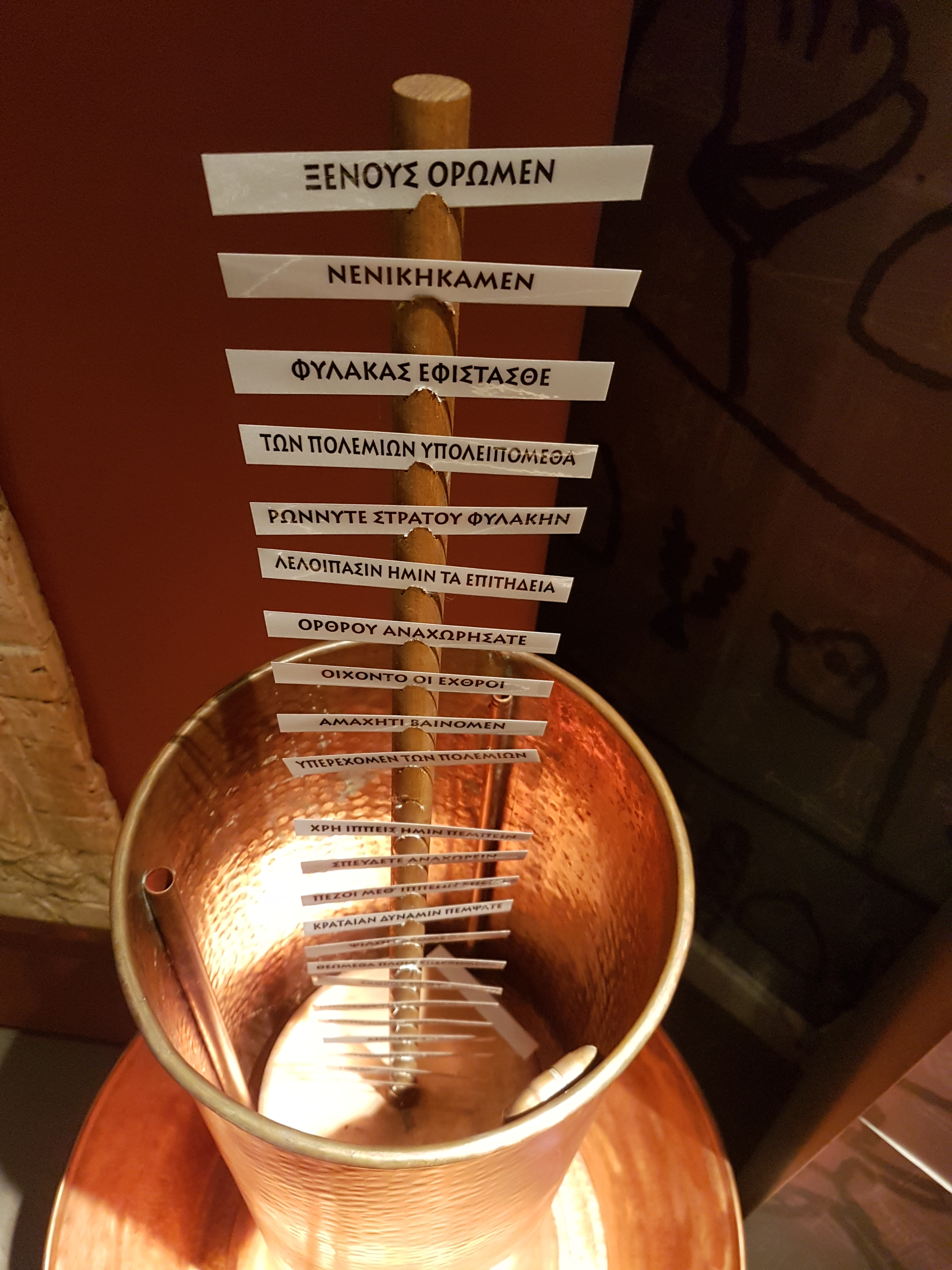
Reconstructed model, messages attached to rod, Thessaloniki Science Center and Technology Museum

The ancient Greek design was described in the 4th century BC by Aeneas Tacticus and the 3rd century BC by the historian Polybius.

The system involved identical containers on separate hills, which are not connected to each other; each container would be filled with water, and a vertical rod floated within it. The rods were inscribed with various predetermined codes at various points along its height.

To send a message, the sending operator would use a torch to signal the receiving operator; once the two were synchronized, they would simultaneously open the spigots at the bottom of their containers. Water would drain out until the water level reached the desired code, at which point the sender would signal with his torch, and the operators would simultaneously close their spigots. Thus the length of time between the sender's torch signals could be correlated with specific predetermined codes and messages.

A contemporary description of the ancient telegraphic method was provided by Polybius. In The Histories, Polybius wrote:

Aeneas, the author of the work on strategy, [writing] to find a remedy for the difficulty, advanced matters a little, but his device still fell far short of our requirements, as can be seen from his description of it.

He says that those who are about to [communicate] urgent news to each other by fire signal should procure two earthenware vessels of exactly the same width and depth, the depth being some three cubits and the width one. Then they should have corks made a little narrower than the mouths of the vessels [so that the cork slides through the neck and drops easily into the vessel] and through the middle of each cork should pass a rod graduated in equal section of three finger-breadths, each clearly marked off from the next. In each section should be written the most evident and ordinary events that occur in war, e.g., on the first, "Cavalry arrived in the country," on the second "Heavy infantry," on the third "Light-armed infantry," next "Infantry and cavalry," next "Ships," next "Corn," and so on until we have entered in all the sections the chief contingencies of which, at the present time, there is a reasonable probability in wartime. Next, he tells us to bore holes in both vessels of exactly the same size, so that they allow exactly the same escape.

Then we are to fill the vessels with water and put on the corks with the rods in them and allow the water to flow through the two apertures. When this is done it is evident that, the conditions being precisely similar, in proportion as the water escapes the two corks will sink and the rods will disappear into the vessels. When by experiment it is seen that the rapidity of escape is in both cases the same, the vessels are to be conveyed to the places in which both parties are to look after the signals and deposited there. Now whenever any of the contingencies written on the rods occurs he tells us to raise a torch and to wait until the corresponding party raises another. When both the torches are clearly visible the signaler is to lower his torch and at once allow the water to escape through the aperture. Whenever, as the corks sink, the contingency you wish to communicate reaches the mouth of the vessel he tells the signaler to raise his torch and the receivers of the signal are to stop the aperture at once and to note which of the messages written on the rods is at the mouth of the vessel. This will be the message delivered, if the apparatus works at the same pace in both cases.

Modern experiments show that the data transfer rate can achieve 151 letter per hour.

== British hydraulic semaphore system ==
The British civil engineer Francis Whishaw, who later became a principal in the General Telegraph Company, publicized a hydraulic telegraph in 1838 but was unable to deploy it commercially. By applying pressure at a transmitter device connected to a water-filled pipe which travelled all the way to a similar receiver device, he was able to effect a change in the water level which would then indicate coded information to the receiver's operator.

The system was estimated to cost £200 per mile (1.6 km) and could convey a vocabulary of 12,000 words. The U.K.'s Mechanics Magazine in March 1838 described it as follows:

...a column of water [can] be conveniently employed to transmit information. Mr. Francis Whishaw has conveyed a column of water through sixty yards of pipe in the most convoluted form, and the two ends of the column being on a level, motion is no sooner given to one end than it is communicated through the whole sixty yards to the other end of the column. No perceptible interval elapses between the time of impressing motion on one end of the column and of communicating it to the other. To each end of a column he attaches a float board with an index, and the depression of any given number of figures on one index, will be immediately followed by a corresponding rise of the float board and index at the other end. It is supposed that this simple longitudinal motion can be made to convey all kinds of information. It appears to us that the amount of information which can be conveyed by the motion in one direction only, of the water, or backward and forwards, must be limited. To make the mere motion backwards and forwards of a float board, indicated on a graduated index, convey a great number of words or letters, is the difficulty to be overcome.

The article concluded speculatively that the "... hydraulic telegraph may supersede the semaphore and the galvanic telegraph".

== See also ==
- Byzantine beacon system
- Phryctoria
- Heliograph
- Optical communication
- Signal lamp
