= Smoke signal =

Smoke used as a mode of communication

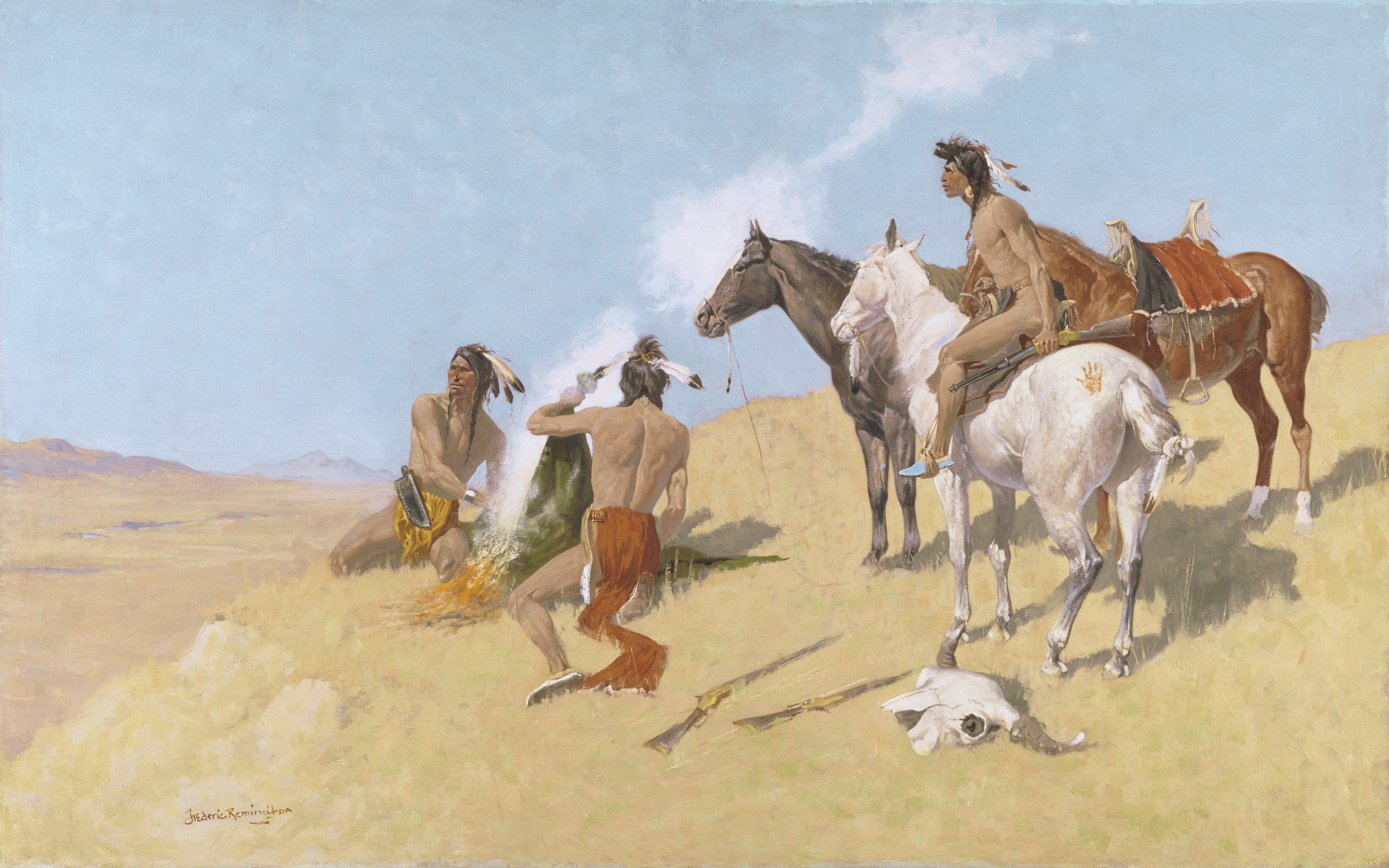
A painting of Native Americans using a smoke signal by Frederic Remington

The smoke signal is one of the oldest forms of long-distance communication. It is a form of visual communication used over a long distance. In general smoke signals are used to transmit news, signal danger, or to gather people to a common area.

== History and usage ==
In ancient China, soldiers along the Great Wall sent smoke signals on its beacon towers to warn one another of enemy invasion. The colour of the smoke communicated the size of the invading party. By placing the beacon towers at regular intervals, and situating a soldier in each tower, messages could be transmitted over the entire 7,300 kilometres of the Wall. Smoke signals also warned the inner castles of the invasion, allowing them to coordinate a defense and garrison supporting troops.

Misuse of the smoke signal is traditionally considered to have contributed to the fall of the Western Zhou dynasty in the 8th century BCE. King You of Zhou was said to have had a habit of fooling his warlords with false warning beacons to amuse Bao Si, his concubine.

From at least the 13th century onwards, the use of smoke signals is documented in the cities, castles, towers, and villages of northern and central Italy as a means of warning of enemy approach in times of war. A single column of smoke would indicate that the enemy forces were large in number, whereas two columns signified that the threat consisted of only a small contingent. At night, the same signals were conveyed by means of fires or lanterns.

During Sri Lanka's Kandyan period, soldiers stationed on the mountain peaks alerted each other of impending enemy attack (from English, Dutch or Portuguese people) by signaling from peak to peak. In this way, they could transmit a message to the King in just a few hours.

North American indigenous peoples also communicated via smoke signal. Each tribe had its own signaling system and understanding. A signaler started a fire on an elevation typically using damp grass, which caused a column of smoke to rise. The grass was taken off as it dried and another bundle was placed on the fire. Reputedly the location of the smoke along the incline conveyed a meaning. If it came from halfway up the hill, it signaled that all was well; but from the top of the hill, it signified danger.

Colored smoke grenades are commonly used by military forces to mark positions, especially during calls for artillery or air support.

Smoke signals may also refer to smoke-producing devices used to send distress signals.

== Examples ==
=== The Catholic Church ===
Since the 19th century the College of Cardinals has used smoke signals to indicate the taking of a vote during a papal conclave. Eligible cardinals conduct a secret ballot until a Papal candidate receives a vote of two-thirds plus one. The ballots are burned after each vote; since 1914 black smoke has indicated a failed election, and white smoke means a new pope has been elected.

=== Native Americans ===
Lewis and Clark's journals cite several occasions when they adopted the Native American method of setting the plains on fire to communicate the presence of their party or their desire to meet with local tribes.

==== Yámana ====
Yámanas of South America used fire to send messages by smoke signals, for instance if a whale drifted ashore. The large amount of meat required notification of many people so that it would not be wasted. They might also have used smoke signals on other occasions—thus it is possible that Magellan saw such fires and was inspired to name the landscape Tierra del Fuego ("Land of Fire"); however, he may have seen the smoke or lights of natural phenomena.

=== Noon Gun ===
The Cape Town Noon Gun, specifically the smoke its firing generates, was used to set marine chronometers in Table Bay.

=== Aboriginal Australians ===
Aboriginal Australians throughout Australia have used smoke signals for various purposes— sometimes to notify others of their presence, particularly when entering lands which were not their own. Sometimes used to describe visiting Whites, smoke signals were the fastest way to send messages. Smoke signals were sometimes used to notify of incursions by hostile tribes, or to arrange meetings between hunting parties of the same tribe. This signal could be from a fixed lookout on a ridge or from a mobile band of tribesman. "Putting up a smoke" often promoted nearby individuals or groups to reply with their own signals. Different colours of smoke (black, white or blue, depending on whether the material being burnt was wet grass, dry grass, reeds or other materials) were used to convert information, as was the smoke's shape (a column, ball or ring), allowing a messaging system sophisticated enough to include the names of individual tribesmen. Like other means of communication, signals could be misinterpreted. In one recorded instance, a smoke signal reply translated as "we are coming" was misinterpreted as joining a war party for protection of the tribe, when it was actually to indicate hunting parties coming together after a successful hunt.

=== Goryeo and Joseon ===
The beacon fire signal system (bongsu, 봉수, 烽燧) was formally institutionalized during the early Goryeo period in 1149 (the 3rd year of King Uijong’s reign). According to historical records, it was enacted by royal decree following a memorial submitted by Jo Jin-yak (曺晋若), the Military Commissioner of the Northwestern Region (Seobukmyeon Byeongmasa, 西北面兵馬使). Under this system, signals were sent using smoke during the day and fire at night. The method of bongsu involved using fire at night and smoke during the day. The signaling system followed a five-tiered structure: one torch (geo, 炬) was lit in times of peace; two when enemy ships were spotted at sea; three when they approached the coast; four when they engaged with Korean naval forces; and five when enemy troops landed on shore. These signals were immediately reported by local commanders(ojang, 오장, 五將) to regional governors. In the capital, the Ministry of War (Byeongjo, 병조, 兵曹) monitored the beacons and reported the situation to the Royal Secretariat (Seungjeongwon, 승정원, 承政院), which then informed the king.

=== Aviation ===
Modern aviation has made skywriting possible.

== See also ==
- Polybius square
- Optical telegraph
