= Aeneas Tacticus =

4th century BC Greek writer

- Αἰνείας ὁ Τακτικός
- Occupation: Writer
- Writing career
- Period: 4th century BC
- Subject: Art of war
- Notable work: How to Survive under Siege

Aeneas Tacticus (Ancient Greek: Αἰνείας ὁ Τακτικός, romanized: Aineías ho Taktikós; fl. 4th century BC) was one of the earliest Greek writers on the art of war and is credited as the first author to provide a complete guide to securing military communications. Polybius described his design for a hydraulic semaphore system. His only surviving work, How to Survive Under Siege, covers how to defend a fortified city that is under siege. The work gives instruction to not just military commanders but also the citizens of the city under attack, providing secure communication, internal security, and how to keep morale high. This work is what credits him with having the oldest known book on defense warfare in Greek literature. He also provides a lot of insight into the politics within the classical polis.

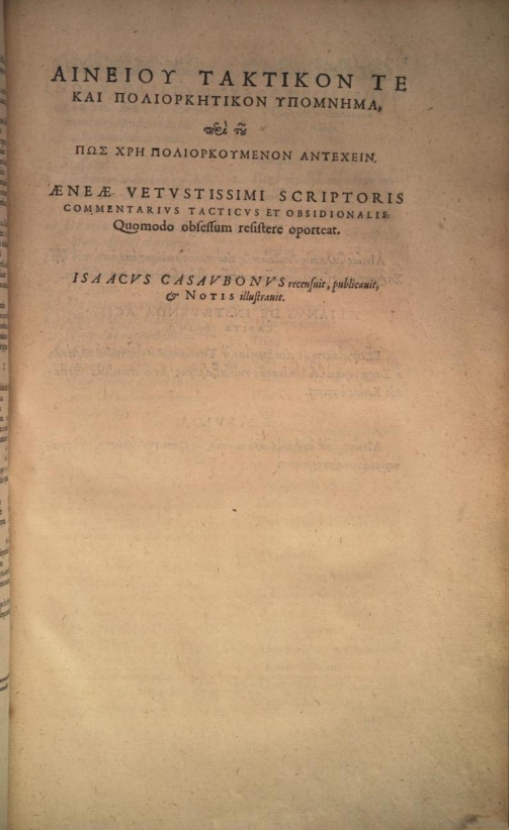
Part-title page of the first printed edition of Aeneas Tacticus, by Isaac Casaubon, an appendix to his edition of Polybius (Cologne, 1609)

According to Aelianus Tacticus and Polybius, he wrote a number of treatises (Ὑπομνήματα) on the subject. The only extant one, How to Survive under Siege (Ancient Greek: Περὶ τοῦ πῶς χρὴ πολιορκουμένους ἀντέχειν, Perì toû pôs chrḕ poliorkouménous antéchein), deals with the best methods of defending a fortified city. Aeneas describes how one should choose trustworthy guards to maintain the secure communications to detect internal conspiracies, as well as simpler tactics like securing the surrounding walls and gates. An epitome of the whole was made by Cineas, minister of Pyrrhus, king of Epirus. The work is chiefly valuable as containing a large number of historical illustrations.

Aeneas was considered by Isaac Casaubon to have been a contemporary of Xenophon and identical with the Arcadian general Aeneas of Stymphalus, whom Xenophon (Hellenica, vii.3) mentions as fighting at the Battle of Mantinea (362 BC). Most modern historians agree that there's little that can be confirmed about Aeneas's life, and details about him are suggested from themes reflected the surviving treatise. Through his writing you can see the correlation between defensive challenges and political instability within the Greek city-states during the 4th century BC. This shows he had experiences in domestic security or civic defense.

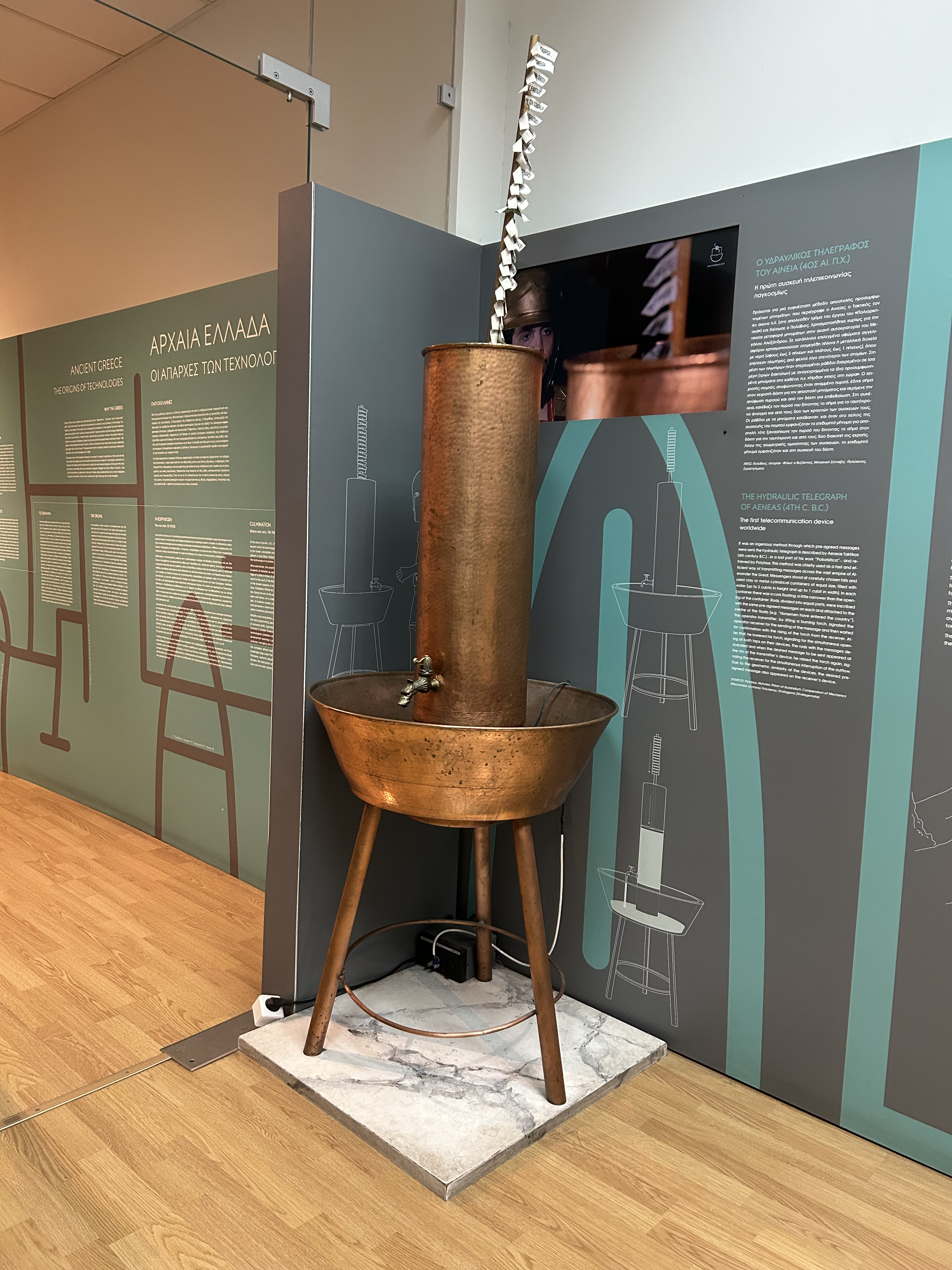
A reconstruction of the hydraulic telegraph of Aeneas Tacticus in Kotsanas Museum of Ancient Greek Technology, Athens, Greece.

He also is dated to have one of the first known references to a hydraulic telegraph, allowing for the transmission of simple, prearranged messages across distances connected by line-of-sight.

The system involved identical containers on separate hills; each container would be filled with water, and a vertical rod floated within it. The rods were inscribed with various predetermined codes at various points along its height. To send a message, the sending operator would use a torch to signal the receiving operator; once the two were synchronized, they would simultaneously open the spigots at the bottom of their containers. Water would drain out until the water level reached the desired code, at which point the sender would signal with his torch, and the operators would simultaneously close their spigots. Thus the length of time between the sender's torch signals would be correlated with specific predetermined codes and messages.

Aeneas's treatise sustained its influence with writers on military theory after his time. Aelianus Tacticus and Polybius both refer to him as a pioneer on communication and military tactics, showing the value others had on his observations. How to Survive Under Siege is viewed as an important document for the understanding of the ins and outs of internal security and urban defense in Classical Greece by modern scholarship. Recent studies emphasize the treatise's blend of insight into civic organization and practical instruction which can make it a strong source for historians of both warfare and political life.
