= Kikonion =

Coordinates: 41°03′01″N 29°03′11″E

Kikonion was a coastal town of ancient Bithynia located on the Bosphorus.

Its site is located near Çengelköy in Asiatic Turkey.
