= Ferdi Tayfur =

Turkish singer, actor and director (1945–2025)

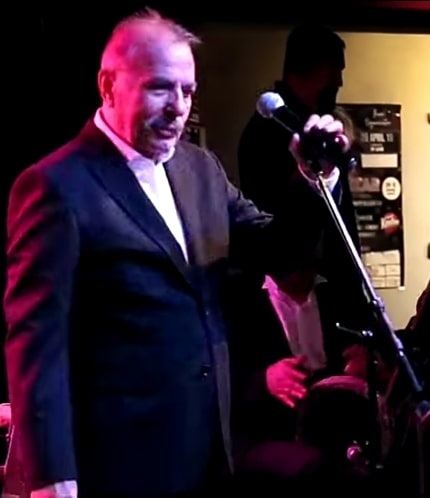
- Tayfur in 2015
- Born: Ferdi Tayfur Turanbayburt; 15 November 1945; Yüreğir, Adana Province, Turkey
- Died: 2 January 2025 (aged 79); Antalya Province, Turkey
- Resting place: Yeniköy Cemetery, Yeniköy, Sarıyer, Istanbul
- Occupations: musician; composer; actor; film director; songwriter; screenwriter
- Partner(s): Zeliha Turanbayburt (1974-2025); Necla Nazır (1976–2007); Habibe Ümyanı Demir (1990–2010)
- Children: Timur Turanbayburt, Tuğçe Tayfur, Taha Tayfur, Tuğba Dınız, Funda Doğrul
- Musical career
- Genres: Arabesque; fantasy; Turkish art
- Instrument: saz
- Years active: 1967–2025
- Label: Ferdifon Müzik

Signature
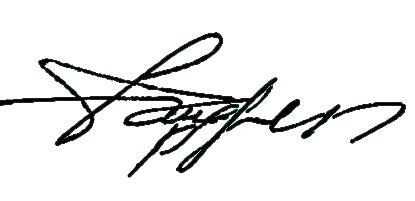

Ferdi Tayfur (Turkish pronunciation: [ˌfæɾdi tajˈfuɾ]; born Ferdi Tayfur Turanbayburt; 15 November 1945 – 2 January 2025) was a Turkish singer, actor, director, songwriter and screenwriter. He was born in the Taşçı neighbourhood of Adana and led a successful career in Arabesque music. The artist, who earned nine golden certifications in total, was renowned for his songs, which he included in motion pictures as well. In the Turkish media, he was commonly known as "Ferdi Baba". Having released more than 30 albums and over 30 films, he founded Ferdifon Records in 1982 and also entered the construction sector in 2009.

== Life and career ==
Tayfur was born in Adana and his father Cumali Bey named him after his favorite voice actor Ferdi Tayfur. His father wanted his son to have a proper education, but after he was murdered when exiting a casino, Tayfur left school and led a life of poverty, with his mother marrying another man after his death. He revealed that he wanted to study but could not do so because of lack of opportunities. In his childhood, he worked as an apprentice in a candy store owned by his stepfather, and there he learned how to read. Tayfur, who later worked on the farm and contributed to the family's income, started singing at weddings during the same years. Later, he participated in Adana Radio's music contest.

Tayfur made deals with Seda Plak in 1968 to release two records, but the recordings were not well received. He then went back to Adana to work on the farm. As well, he continued to work on his music career. After a three-year break he released his new record, Huzurum Kalmadı. In 1973, he released Kır Çiçekleri under the label Görsev Plak. In 1974, he released another record Bana Gerçekleri Söyle. In 1975, he signed a new contract with Elenor Plak. After the release of Bırak Şu Gurbeti, he became widely known with the release of his song Çeşme.

=== Music career ===
Tayfur's first album, which included songs written by himself, made a good sale in the years when he started his musical career but due to financial difficulties, he sold two songs to Elenor Plak's proprietor Atilla Alpsakarya who eventually gave them to Gülden Karaböcek. Tayfur continued to publish his records and eventually became widely known with his song "Çeşme", and in 1977 he was cast in a leading role alongside Necla Nazır in a movie with the same title. The film was watched by 12 million people at the time.

Alongside releasing albums, he gave numerous concerts. 200,000 people attended his concert in Gülhane Park in 1993.

=== Illness and death ===
In 2020, Tayfur received a kidney transplant from his son.

Tayfur died at a Antalya Medical Park hospital in on 2 January 2025, at the age of 79. He was transferred to Istanbul, and buried in the family grave at Yeniköy Cemetery following a memorial ceremony in the Atatürk Cultural Center and the funeral prayer at Barbaros Hayrettin Pasha Mosque on 4 January.

== Discography ==
Year	Album	Label	Notes
1967	Yapıştı Canıma Bir Kara Sevda/Allah Şahidim Olsun	Seda Plak no 554	
1967	Eyvah/Kalbimde Bir Ateştin(sürtük)	Seda Plak no 554	
1968	Leyla/Aşkınla Beni Öldürdün	Görsel Plak Ve Kasetçilik	
1968	Tatlı Çingenem/Adana Barajında	Saya Plak no 48	
1968	Dilek Kapısı	Harika Müzik	
1969	Dilek Kapısı/Öldürecek Beni Bu Kara Sevda	Saya Plak no 53	
1969	Melekler Yüze Güler/Derdin nedir sormuyorlar	Kader Plak no 92	
1969	Dünya Ahret Kardeşimsin/Bilememki Deli Gönül	Kader Plak 102	
1970	Çok Bekledim / Kaderimsin	Gen Plak 7	
1970	Kaderimsin /Çok Bekledim Gelmedin	Zeren Plak 5	
1971	Kaderimsin / Sevgili Yarim	Elele Plak	
1971	Sana Kaderimsin Dedim / Postacılar	Görsev Plak 30	
1971	Mahkumların Duası / Mahşer Günü	Görsev Plak 29	
1971	Nerelerdesin Sultanım / Sebebim Nazlı Yar Oldu	Serenad Plak 128	
1972	Dur Dinle Sevgilim / Kır Çiçekleri	Görsev Plak 44	
1972	Yüreğimde Yara Var / Bana Gerçekleri Söyle	Görsev Plak 49	
1973	Sakın Düşme	Görsev Plak 61	
1973	Bana Gerçekleri Söyle/Ümitsiz Aşk	Görsev Plak	
1974	Akşam Güneşi / Çiçekler Açsın	Elenor Plak 1037	
1974	Bırak Şu Gurbeti / Sevdalılar Beni Anlar	Elenor Plak 1038	
1974	Postacılar	Harika Müzik	
1974	Bitmeyen Çile	Görsel Plak Ve Kasetçilik	
1975	Yadeller – Ağlamazsam Uyuyamam	Elenor Plak	
1975	Nerelerdesin Sultanım - Sebebim Nazlı Yar Oldu	Elenor Plak	
1975	Bırak Şu Gurbeti	Minareci Müzik	
1975	Ferdi Tayfur 1(Mahkumların Duası)	Türküola Müzik	
1976	Ekmek Parası (albüm)	Türküola Müzik	
1976	Deli Gibi Sevdim	Uzelli Müzik	
1976	Ferdi Tayfur 3(Çeşme)	Uzelli Müzik	
1977	Huzurum Kalmadı	Elenor Müzik	
1977	Ferdi Tayfur 4(Benim Gibi Sevenler)	Uzelli Müzik	
1977	5 Minareci	Minareci Müzik	
1978	Batan Güneş	Elenor Müzik	
1978	Ferdi Tayfur 6(Bağlama Versiyon)	Minareci Müzik	
1979	Son Sabah	Elenor Müzik	
1979	Mapushane	Uzelli Müzik	
1980	Yuvasız Kuşlar	Elenor Müzik	
1980	Ferdi Tayfur 9(Batan Güneşin Kralı)	Minareci Müzik	
1980	Nisan Yağmuru 2	Türküola Müzik	
1980	Yuvasız Kuşlar 4	Uzelli Müzik	
1980	Durdurun Dünyayı	Uzelli Müzik	
1980	Avrupa Konser	Uzelli Müzik	Live album
1981	Ferdi Tayfur 10	Minareci Müzik	
1981	İnsan Sevince	Elenor Müzik	
1981	Nisan Yağmuru	Elenor Müzik	
1982	Ben De Özledim	Ferdifon Müzik	
1982	Sabahı Olmayan Geceler	Türküola Müzik	
1982	Bir Avuç Gözyaşı	Uzelli Müzik	
1983	O.Gencebay ve F.Tayfur'dan Seçmeler	Minareci Müzik	
1983	Sen de mi Leyla	Ferdifon Müzik	
1984	Yaktı Beni	Ferdifon Müzik	
1984	Gitme Yarim	Türküola Müzik	
1984	Bu Gece Düğün Var	Türküola Müzik	
1985	Kurtuldum	Ferdifon Müzik	
1985	Ferdi Tayfur 11(Deli Gönül)	Minareci Müzik	
1985	Ferdifon'dan Seçmeler 1	Ferdifon Müzik	
1986	Derbeder	Elenor Müzik	
1986	Merak Etme Sen	Elenor Müzik	
1986	Ferdi Tayfur ve Onlar	Türküola Müzik	
1986	Haram Oldu	Ferdifon Müzik	
1986	Ferdifon'dan Seçmeler 2	Ferdifon Müzik	
1986	Haram Oldu 2	Türküola Müzik	
1987	İnsan Sevince 2	Elenor Müzik	
1987	İçimde Bir His Var(albüm)- Ya Benimsin Ya Toprağın(albüm)	Ferdifon Müzik	
1987	Ferdifon'dan Seçmeler 3	Ferdifon Müzik	
1988	Naz Etme – Canına Okuyacağım	Ferdifon Müzik	
1988	Arabesk Rüzgarı	Bayar Müzik	
1988	Acılar	Minareci Müzik	
1988	Bir Sen Söyle	Türküola Müzik	
1989	Allah'ım Sen Bilirsin (albüm)	Ferdifon Müzik	
1989	Ferdifon'dan Seçmeler 4	Ferdifon Müzik	
1989	Sakın Düşme	Görsev Müzik	
1989	Gülhane'den Sevgilerle	Ferdifon Müzik	Live album
1990	Hoşçakal	Ferdifon Müzik	
1990	Özlem Yangını	Minareci Müzik	
1991	Ferdifon'dan Seçmeler 5	Ferdifon Müzik	
1991	Gelirsen – Bana da Söyle	Ferdifon Müzik	
1992	Dert Yağmuru	Minareci Müzik	
1992	Yetiş Emmioğlu	Türküola Müzik	
1992	Niçin Benden Uzaksın	Minareci Müzik	
1992	Prangalar	Ferdifon Müzik	
1993	Kralların Müzik Şöleni	Elenor Müzik	
1993	Zirvede İki Kral	Dünya Müzik	
1993	Acılı Dostane Arabesk	Tutku Müzik	
1994	Mor Güller – Fadime'nin Düğünü	Ferdifon Müzik	
1994	Baharımsın Kışımsın 9	Elenor Müzik	
1995	Dünya "Bir Şarkı Seç Kendine"	Ferdifon Müzik	
1996	Zaman Tüneli Arşiv 1	Ferdifon Müzik	Compilation
1996	Altın Şarkılar	Dilan Müzik Üretim	
1997	Tiryakiyim Ben	Ferdifon Müzik	
1997	Of Dağlar	Ferdifon Müzik	
1998	Ferdi Tayfur Klasikleri Arşiv 2	Ferdifon Müzik	Compilation
1999	Yoksun – Kör Talih	Ferdifon Müzik	
1999	Zengin Olursam	Ferdifon Müzik	
2001	Zaman Tüneli Arşiv 3	Ferdifon Müzik	Compilation
2002	İnceden	Ferdifon Müzik	
2003	Durun Ayaklarım	Ferdifon Müzik	
2003	Yandı Gönlüm	Ferdifon Müzik	Maxi single
2004	Ferdifon'dan Seçmeler 6	Ferdifon Müzik	
2004	Bir Demet Gül	Ferdifon Müzik	
2006	Aşkın Cezası	Ferdifon Müzik	
2007	Gençliğimin Şarkıları	Ferdifon Müzik	
2009	Nisan Yağmuru 6	Elenor Müzik	Compilation
2009	Boynu Bükük Şarkılarım	Ferdifon Müzik	Compilation
2010	Baharımsın Kışımsın	Elenor Müzik	Compilation

== Filmography ==
Year	Film	Role	Actor	Director	Effect	Writer	Notes
2016	Zor Hayat		No	Yes	Yes	Yes	Cinema
2008	Memur Muzaffer	Muzaffer Mutlu	Yes				TV Series
2007	Yersiz Yurtsuz	Emrullah	Yes				TV Series
2007	Natuk Baytan Belgeseli	Ferdi Tayfur	Yes				
2007	Ben Ferdi Tayfur	Ferdi Tayfur	Yes				
2000	Hayatım Roman	Ferdi Tayfur	Yes				TV Series
2002	Reyting Hamdi		Yes				TV Series
1989	Allah'ım Sen Bilirsin	Ferdi	Yes				
1989	Bu Şehrin Geceleri	Ferdi	Yes				
1988	Bu Talihimin Canına Okuyacağım	Ferdi	Yes	Yes		Yes	
1988	Elveda Mutluluklar	Ferdi	Yes				
1988	Ah Bir Çocuk Olsaydım	Ferdi	Yes				
1987	Sevgiler Çiçek Gibi	Ferdi	Yes	Yes			
1987	Ya Benimsin Ya Toprağın	Ferdi	Yes	Yes			
1986
1986	İçimde Bir His Var	Ferdi	Yes	Yes		Yes	
1986	Affet Allah'ım	Ferdi	Yes	Yes	Yes	Yes	
1985	Her Şeyim Sensin	Ferdi	Yes				
1985	Haram Oldu	Ferdi	Yes	Yes		Yes	
1984	Utanıyorum	Ferdi	Yes				
1984	Çılgın Arzular	Ferdi	Yes				
1983	Yaktı Beni	Cumali	Yes				
1983	Kalbimdeki Acı	Ferdi	Yes				
1983	Yıldızlar da Kayar	Ferdi	Yes				
1982	Sen de mi Leyla (film)	Ferdi	Yes				
1982	Hasret Sancısı	Ferdi	Yes				
1982	Günaha Girme	Ferdi	Yes				
1981	Kara Gurbet	Ferdi	Yes				
1981	Ben de Özledim (film)	Ferdi	Yes				
1981	Olmaz Olsun (film)	Ferdi	Yes				
1981	Bir Damla Ateş	Ferdi	Yes				
1980	Durdurun Dünyayı (film)	Ferdi	Yes				
1980	Huzurum Kalmadı	Ferdi	Yes		Yes		
1980	Boynu Bükük	Ferdi	Yes				
1979	İnsan Sevince	Ferdi	Yes		Yes		
1979	Yuvasız Kuşlar	Ferdi	Yes				
1978	Son Sabah	Ferdi	Yes				
1978	Batan Güneş	Ferdi	Yes				
1978	Yadeller	Ferdi	Yes				
1977	Benim Gibi Sevenler	Ferdi	Yes			Yes	
1977	Derbeder	Ferdi	Yes				
1976	Çeşme	Ferdi	Yes				

== Clips ==
Year	Album	Music
1990	Hoşçakal	Bana Sor
1990	Hoşçakal	Hatıran Yeter
1990	Hoşçakal	Hoşçakal Leyla
1991	Gelirsen - Bana Da Söyle	Bana Da Söyle
1991	Gelirsen - Bana Da Söyle	Beni Düşün
1991	Gelirsen - Bana Da Söyle	Cano
1991	Gelirsen - Bana Da Söyle	Gelirsen
1991	Gelirsen - Bana Da Söyle	Unutmak İstiyorum
1992	Prangalar	Emmoğlu
1992	Prangalar	Geçen Yıl
1992	Prangalar	Sabahçı Kahvesi
1994	Mor Güller - Fadime'nin Düğünü	Bari Sen
1994	Mor Güller - Fadime'nin Düğünü	Fadime'nin Düğünü
1995	Dünya	Ağla Yüreğim
1995	Dünya	Yağmur Çamur
1996	Zaman Tüneli Arşiv 1	Çeşme
1997	Of Dağlar	Dönebilsem
1997	Of Dağlar	Of Dağlar
1998	Ferdi Tayfur Klasikleri Arşiv 2	Çiçekler Açsın
1998	Ferdi Tayfur Klasikleri Arşiv 2	Yüreğimde Yara Var
1999	Yoksun - Kör Talih	Bağbozumu
1999	Yoksun - Kör Talih	Kör Talih
1999	Yoksun - Kör Talih	Yoksun
2000	Zengin Olursam	Bu Şehir
2000	Zengin Olursam	Sigarayı Bıraktım
2002	İnceden	Sen Gittin
2003	Durun Ayaklarım	Durun Ayaklarım
2004	Bir Demet Gül	Garson
2004	Bir Demet Gül	Kadınım
2006	Aşkın Cezası	Gizli Sevda

== Books ==
- Şekerci Çırağı, novel, Kora Yayın, (2003)
- Yağmur Durunca, novel, Kora Yayın, (2008)
- Bir Zamanlar Ağaçtım, novel, Kora Yayın, (2013)
- Paraşütteki Çocuk, novel, (2014)

== Television shows ==
- 1993: Yetiş Emmioğlu, presenter (Show TV)
- 2009: Korolar Çarpışıyor, contestant (Show TV)
- 2009: Boynu Bükük Şarkılar, presenter (Kanal 7)
