= Tarabya British Schools =

- Tarabya İngiliz Okulları

Location
- Tarabya, Yeniköy; Istanbul; Turkey
- Coordinates: 41.1395°N 29.0508°E

Information
- Type: Private coeducational
- Established: 2013; 13 years ago
- School district: Tarabya, Sarıyer
- Chairman: Mehmet Gültekin
- Grades: Kindergarten, 1-4, Middle School, Prep, 9-12
- Campus: Urban
- Colours: Blue, red & gold
- Accreditation: Cambridge Associate School
- Affiliations: COBIS, MAIS, Duke of Edinburgh's Award, British Chamber of Commerce Turkey
- Website: tarabyabritishschools.com

Tarabya British Schools (often abbreviated as TBS) also Özel Tarabya İngiliz Okulları (Turkish) is a private school in Tarabya and Yeniköy, Istanbul, that offers both national and international education through an integrated curriculum to both international and Turkish students. It was established in 2013 by the Horizon Group aimed at preparing students to study at internationally recognized and prestigious universities through the Cambridge International A-Level Examinations.

== Campuses ==
The school has four campuses: the Tarabya campus in Tarabya, Sarıyer; the Yeniköy Campus in Yeniköy, Sarıyer; the Çengelköy Campus in Çengelköy, Üsküdar, and the Etiler Campus in Etiler, Beşiktaş.

== Curriculum ==
=== Primary school ===
Opened in September 2015, with a ceremony with the presence of Prince Edward, Earl of Wessex. It is located in the renovated building of a Greek Primary School that functioned between 1870 and 1980 in the neighbourhood of Yeniköy.

== Projects ==
Tarabya British Schools started various social projects such as 'Make a Wish', aimed at raising money through organization of various activities in order to make the wishes of underprivileged children come true. First year the project took place in Ağrı, second year in a small village of Zeyrek, Erzurum province in Eastern Turkey. There are student clubs such as MUN and UNICEF, organizing trips to the debates taking place in other countries and in Istanbul, and arranging benefit concerts. TBS is an active participant of the Duke of Edinburgh's International Award program, for which it has been visited on 15 of October 2015 by Prince Edward, Earl of Wessex. The school was the regional winner in the third stage of the School Enterprise Challenge 2014 and is among 8 schools of the Erasmus+ Eurobalades project.

== Zografyon Greek Primary School for Girls ==
In the premises of the Tarabya British Schools in the Yeniköy District is the Zografyon Greek Primary School for Girls. It was built by the Ottoman Greek architect Konstantinos Dimadis (Greek: Κωνσταντίνος Δημάδης) in 1871. He also built the Phanar Greek Orthodox College. The school was closed in 1980 and due to intentional destruction, neglect, improper additions to the structure and incorrect repairs suffered significant damage. After restorations which was funded by the Yenikoy Panayia Greek Church and School Foundation, the building was reopened in 2017 and now houses a school for pupils at kindergarten and primary school age. In 2018, the restoration won the 2018 European Heritage Award/ Europa Nostra Award in the category Conservation.

== See also ==
- List of schools in Istanbul
- List of high schools in Turkey
- Cambridge International Examinations
- International School
- Education in Turkey
