= Yeniköy Cemetery =

Cemetery in Turkey

- Interactive map of Yeniköy Cemetery

Details
- Location: Yeniköy, Sarıyer, Istanbul
- Country: Turkey
- Coordinates: 41.11832°N 29.05661°E
- Type: Public
- Owned by: Istanbul Metropolitan Municipality

Yeniköy Cemetery (Turkish: Yeniköy Mezarlığı) is a Muslim cemetery in the Yeniköy neighborhood of Sarıyer district of Istanbul in Turkey.

== Notable burials ==
- Sadık Eliyeşil (1925–2008), wealthy businessman as well as racehorse owner and breeder
- Ferdi Tayfur (1945–2025), singer songwriter, actor and director
