= Sadık Eliyeşil =

Turkish businessman

- Born: 2 November 1925; Tarsus, Mersin Province, Turkey
- Died: 16 June 2008 (aged 82); Istanbul, Turkey
- Resting place: Yeniköy Cemetery, Istanbul
- Education: University of Manchester
- Occupations: Businessman; Racehorse breeder
- Spouse: Gülsüm Eliyeşil
- Children: Necmettin Eliyeşil (son); Şerife Karamehmet (daughter); Meliha Eliyeşil (daughter)
- Parent: Şadi Bey then Şadi Eliyeşil (father)

Süleyman Sadık Eliyeşil (2 November 1925 – 16 June 2008) was a wealthy Turkish businessman as well as a racehorse owner and breeder, best known for his thoroughbreds' record winning of 13 races at the Gazi Race, Turkey's most prestigious horse racing event. He was a third-generation member of a rich landowner and industrialist family.

== Biography ==
Sadık Eliyeşil was born on 2 November 1925 to Şadi Bey then Şadi Eliyeşil, from a wealthy family at Tarsus, Mersin Province in southern Turkey. His ancestors were landowners and textile producers in the cotton-growing Çukurova region since the 1880s. The diverse companies owned and run by his family were incorporated in 1972 under Çukurova Holding, one of Turkey's biggest conglomerates today.

It is notable that the home of Müftüzade Sadık Pasha then Sadık Eliyeşil, Sadık Eliyeşil's paternal grandfather, in Tarsus was one of the first two houses to be electrified in the Ottoman Empire in 1902, twelve years before electricity was available in Istanbul, the empire's then capital.

Following his secondary education at Şişli Terakki High School and Boğaziçi High School in Istanbul, he studied textile engineering at the University of Manchester in the United Kingdom. After graduating with a bachelor's degree in 1949, Sadık Eliyeşil returned home.

Between 1963 and 1974, Sadık Eliyeşil served on the board of Mersin İdmanyurdu SK.

He died on 16 June 2008 in Istanbul at the age of 82. Following a funeral service at the Veliefendi Race Course and a religious service at Levent Mosque, he was laid to rest in the family grave at Yeniköy Cemetery in Istanbul.

Sadık Eliyeşil was survived by wife Gülsüm, a son, Necmettin and two daughters, Şerife and Meliha, as well as six grandchildren.

One of his paternal granddaughters, Melissa Eliyeşil, born in 1984 in Istanbul to a Colombian Catholic mother, married into the Faber-Castell family.

== Horse racing ==
Sadık Eliyeşil became interested in equestrian sport in 1943. After his return from the United Kingdom, he worked in the 1950s with his uncle, who owned a stable. In 1956, Sadık Eliyeşil entered Turkish Jockey Club (Turkish: Türkiye Jokey Kulübü, TJK), the renowned equestrian club in the country. In later years, Sadık Eliyeşil served in the club's board of directors.

In an interview, he stated that "His grandfather and uncle had stables, and he is continuing this tradition. He owns four and his wife six racehorses. The family owns two stables in Konya Ereğli and Çamtepe, Tarsus, in which 48 racehorses more are bred." He added that his favourite racehorse is "Karayel" (literally: Mistral), which won the Gazi Race in 1973. A great fan of equestrian sport, he admitted that he was not able to ride horse. He said "Horse breeding and horse riding are very different activities."

His racehorses won the most prestigious horse race Gazi Race (Turkish: Gazi Koşusu) in Turkey 13 times between 1950 and 2005, setting a record which is hard to break.

In the following years of his death, a horse race is scheduled at the Veliefendi Race Course with a prize named after him.
