= Çengelköy =

- Neighbourhood
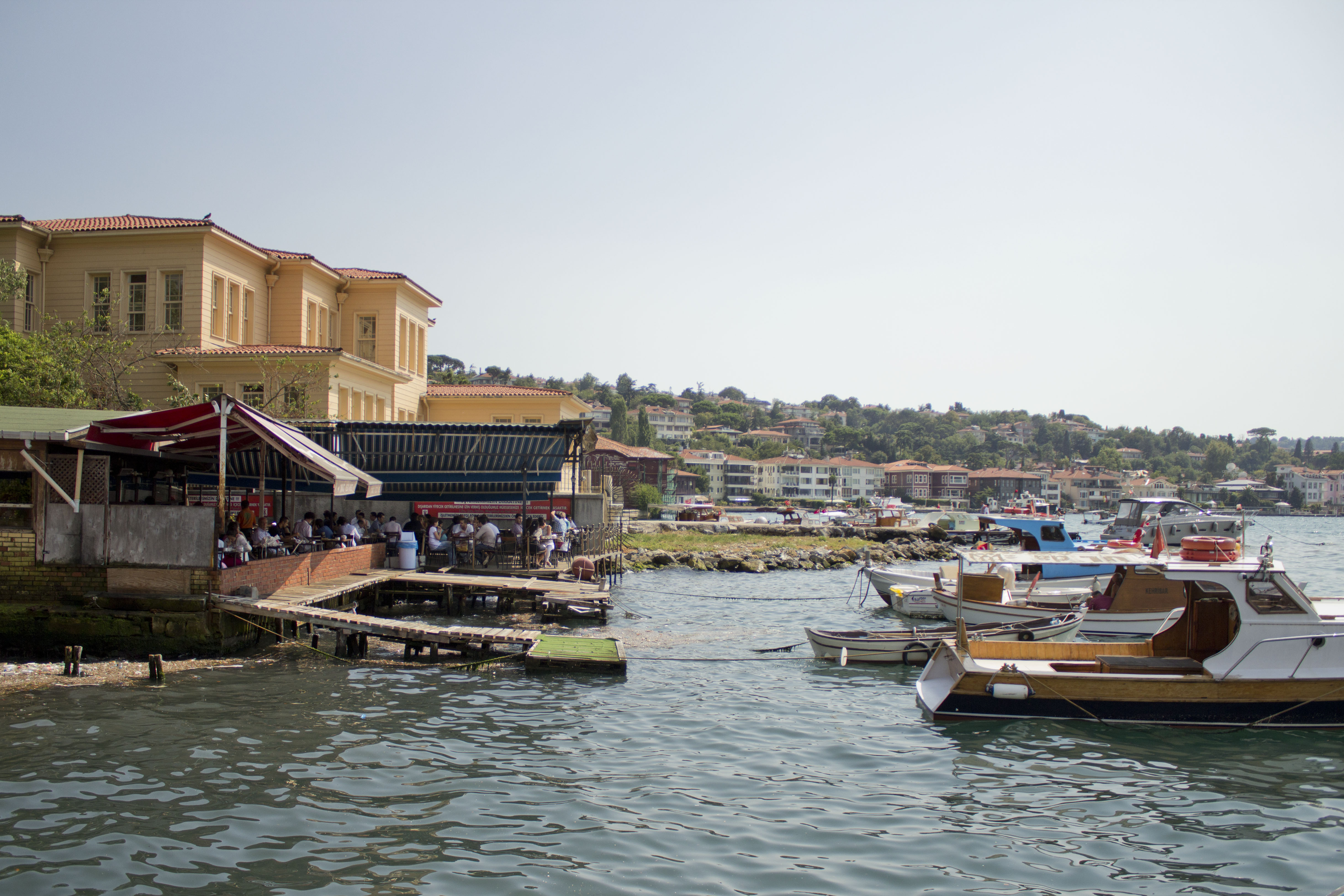

- Location within Turkey Location within Istanbul
- Coordinates: 41.0491°N 29.0620°E
- Country: Turkey
- Province: Istanbul
- District: Üsküdar
- Population (2022): 13,801
- Time zone: UTC+3 (TRT)
- Postal code: 34680
- Area code: 0216

Çengelköy (Turkish pronunciation: [tʃeɲˈɟɛlcøj]) is a neighbourhood in the municipality and district of Üsküdar, Istanbul Province, Turkey. Its population is 13,801 (2022). It is on the Asian shore of the Bosphorus strait, between the neighborhoods of Beylerbeyi and Kuleli. It is mainly a residential district. Many mansions were built there in the Ottoman period. There is a Greek church called Aya Yorgi in the district, which is not used much today. Abdullah Ağa Mansion and Sadullah Pasha Mansion are important mansions in Çengelköy.

From the 6th century, the port of Çengelköy was called Sophianai because of the palace Justin II built nearby for his consort Sophia.

The name Çengelköy means "hook village" and the origin of the name is uncertain. One story put forward is that the village is named after the 19th-century Ottoman admiral Çengeloğlu Tahir Pasha, who had a mosque and waterside mansion built there (there is a Çengeloğlu Street in Çengelköy). Another story derives the name from the Persian word çenkar, "crab," because of the abundance of seafood in the Bosphorus there. A 16th-century Ottoman document apparently refers to the place as "Çenger köyü."

Çengelköy is world-famous for the small cucumbers once grown there (now grown in Kandıra).

Opened in 2015, the Mehmet Çakır Cultural and Sports Center, consisting of six indoor swimming pools, is the biggest sports complex on the Anatolian part of Istanbul.

The Vahdettin Pavilion, also known as the Çengelköy Pavilion, an official residence of the Presidency and a state guest house, is situated on a hill in Çengelköy.

== Education ==
The Çengelköy Campus of Tarabya British Schools is located in this neighbourhood.
