= Yeniköy Synagogue =

Synagogue in Istanbul, Turkey

- Turkish: Yeniköy Sinagogu
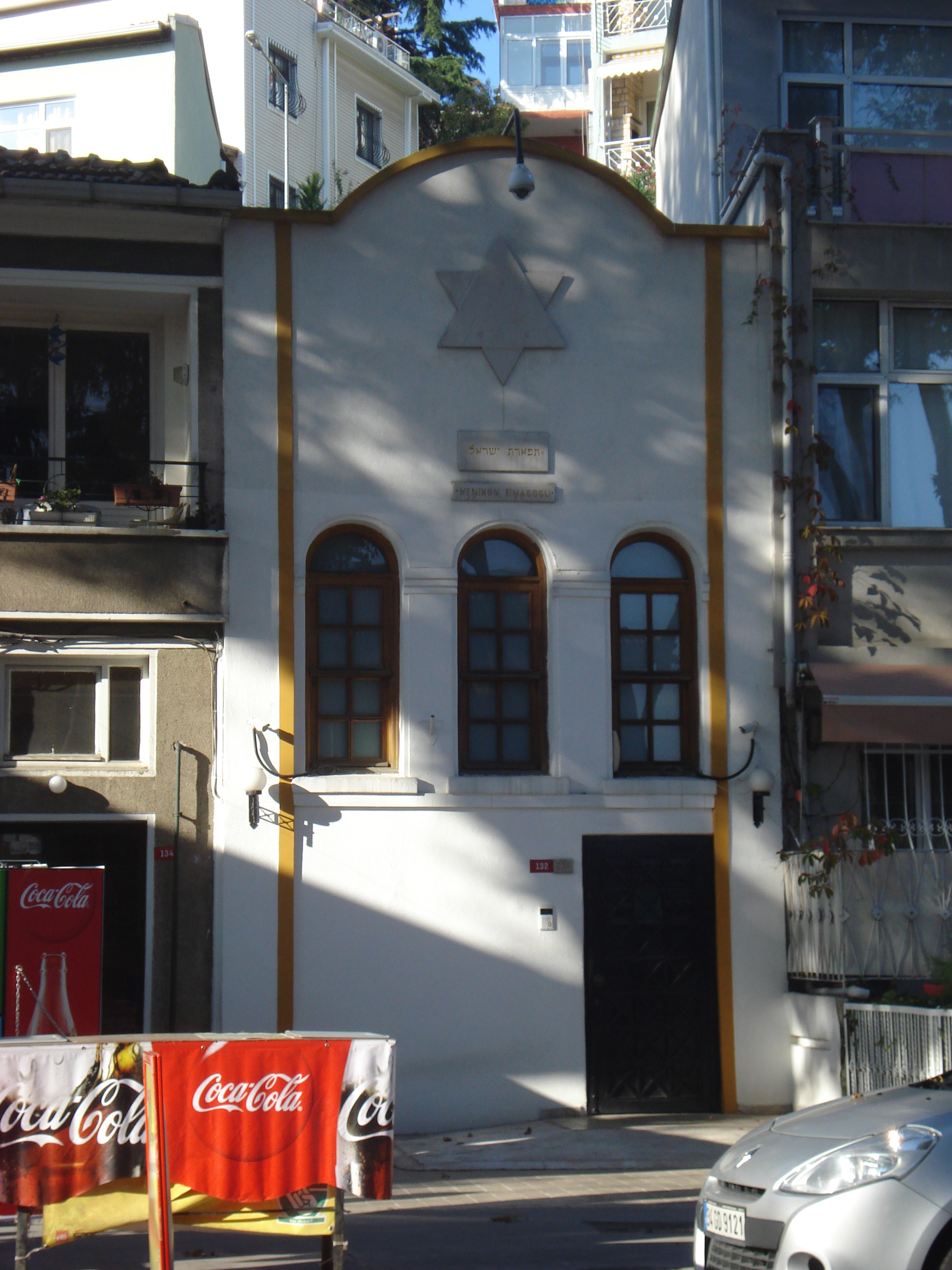
- The synagogue, in 2012

- Location of the synagogue in Istanbul

Religion
- Affiliation: Judaism
- Rite: Nusach Sefard
- Ecclesiastical or organizational status: Synagogue
- Status: Active (during Shabbat)

Location
- Location: 132 Köybaşı Avenue, Yeniköy, Istanbul, Istanbul Province
- Country: Turkey
- Interactive map of Yeniköy Synagogue
- Coordinates: 41°07′06″N 29°03′59″E

Architecture
- Type: Synagogue architecture
- Funded by: Abraham Salomon Camondo
- Completed: 1870s; 1957 (renovations)
- Materials: Brick

The Yeniköy Synagogue (Turkish: Yeniköy Sinagogu), also known as the Tiferet Israel Synagogue, is a Jewish congregation and synagogue, located at 132 Köybaşı Avenue, along the northern part of the Bosphorus in the Yeniköy neighborhood of Istanbul, in the Istanbul Province of Turkey.

The synagogue, said to have been funded by Abraham Salomon Camondo in the late 19th century, was rejuvenated by the renewed presence of Jews who have moved into the area. The synagogue is open for Shabbat services only.

== See also ==
- History of the Jews in Turkey
- List of synagogues in Turkey
