= Mehmet Çakır Cultural and Sports Center =

Cultural and sports complex in Istanbul, Turkey

Coordinates: 41°03′14″N 29°04′12″E

- Mehmet Çakır Kültür ve Spor Merkezi
- Location of Mehmet Çakır Cultural and Sports Center in Istanbul.
- Address: Çengelköy, Bahçelievler Mah. Engin Cad.
- Location: Üsküdar, Istanbul, Turkey
- Owner: Municipality of Üsküdar
- Type: Cultural and Sports Center
- Event: Swimming
- Acreage: 22,500 m^{2} (5.6 acres)

Construction
- Opened: May 26, 2015; 11 years ago

The Mehmet Çakır Cultural and Sports Center (Turkish: Mehmet Çakır Kültür ve Spor Merkezi) is a cultural and sports complex located in Çengelköy neighborhood of Üsküdar district in Istanbul, Turkey. It is named after Mehmet Çakır, the former mayor of Üsküdar district.

The center was built by the Municipality of Üsküdar as a water sports complex on an area of 22,500 m^{2} (5.6 acres) in Çengelköy near Bosphorus. Inaugurated officially on May 26, 2015, the center has three indoor swimming pool halls for males and three for females, including two semi-olympic swimming pools of size 15 m × 25 m (49 ft × 82 ft) with 200-spectator capacity each. It has further a multi-purpose hall and fitness center of 1,000 m^{2} (11,000 sq ft), two watsu pools for aquatic therapy, two shallow pools, gender-separated mini spa pools and a multi-purpose foyer of 250 m^{2} (2,700 sq ft) in addition to administrative offices, a meeting hall and changing rooms. The complex has a parking lot capable of 400 vehicles in total, including a covered obe for 300 vehicles. It is the biggest sports venue on the Anatolian part of Istanbul.

The complex was closed for use due to leaking water from the pool beds down to the basement as reported in October 2015.
