= School Enterprise Challenge =

International business competition

The School Enterprise Challenge is an international competition for schools to establish profitable student-led businesses.

Since 2011, the competition has benefited over 80,000 young people directly from over 90 countries. It was a WISE Awards 2014 finalist.
