= Yeniköy, Sarıyer =

Yeniköy
- Neighbourhood
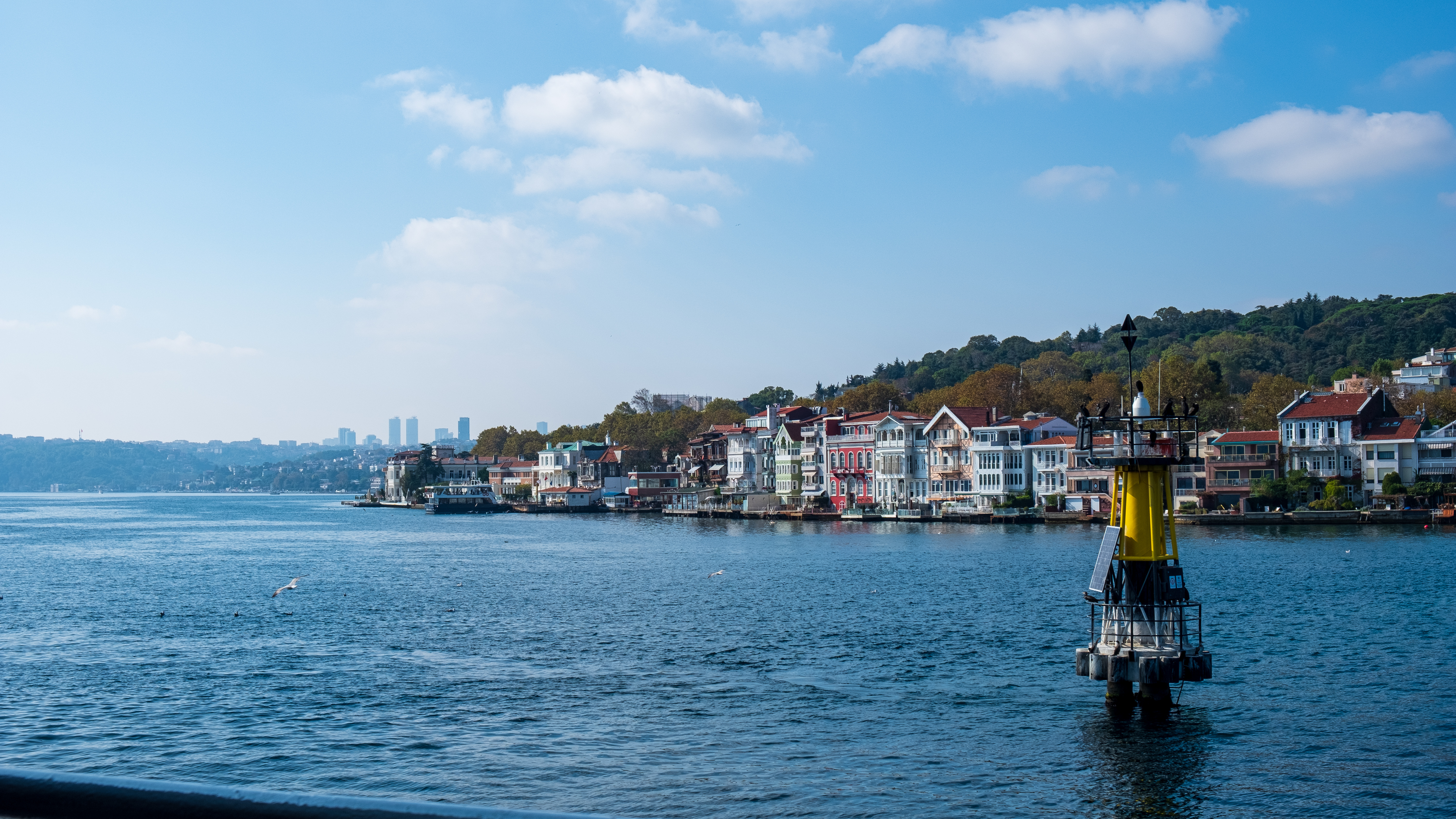
- Yeniköy, Bosphorus shore

- Location within Turkey Location within Istanbul
- Coordinates: 41°07′05″N 29°03′58″E
- Country: Turkey
- Province: Istanbul
- District: Sarıyer
- Population (2022): 14,963
- Time zone: UTC+3 (TRT)

Yeniköy (Turkish: Yeniköy, "New Village"), known in Greek as Neochorion (Greek: Νεοχώριον), Neochori (Νεοχώρι), or Nichori (Νιχώρι or Νηχώρι), sometimes also referred to as Yeni Kioi, is a neighbourhood in the municipality and district of Sarıyer, Istanbul Province, Turkey. Its population is 14,963 (2022). It is located on the European shores of the Bosphorus strait, between the neighbourhoods of İstinye and Tarabya.

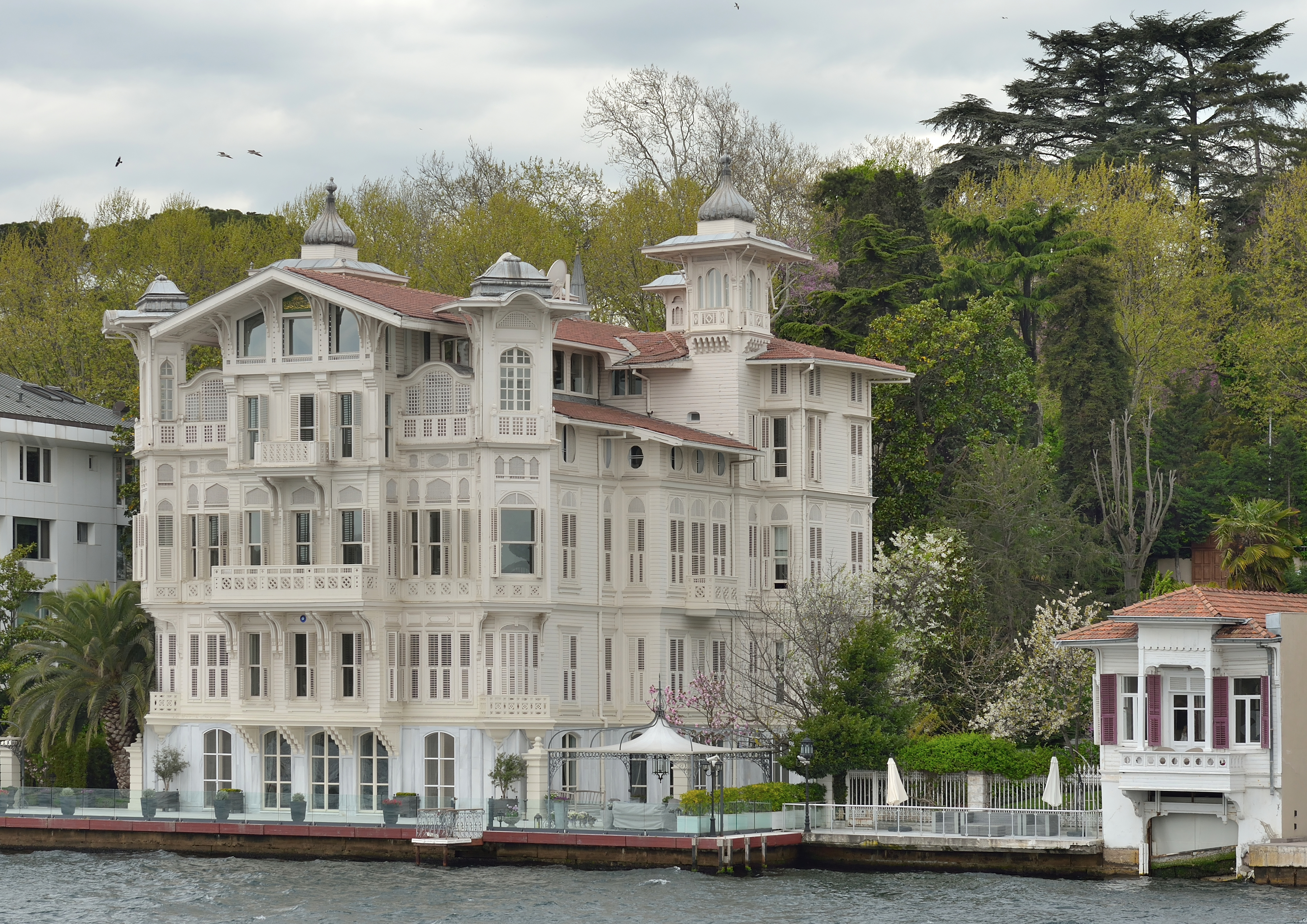
The yalı of Ahmed Afif Pasha in Yeniköy was designed by Alexander Vallaury.

== History ==
Although a Byzantine village had existed in the area, the settlement was in ruin by the time of the Ottoman conquest. After the conquest, the village was repopulated with Greeks and Vlach families from Romania. The Greek population called the village Neohori (Νεοχώρι) which literally meant "new village". This name was later translated to Turkish and adopted by the Ottoman officials. Until the 18th century, Yeniköy was a majority Greek maritime trading town with a Turkish (primarily immigrants from the eastern Black Sea coast), Armenian and Jewish minority. Beginning in the 18th century, many wealthy non-muslims built themselves yalıs along the coastline.

Yeniköy was until the 1955 Istanbul pogrom a neighbourhood with a considerable Greek population as well as Armenian and Jewish communities. The Surp Asdvadzadzin Armenian church and the Yeniköy Synagogue survive to this day.

Today, Yeniköy is considered an affluent neighbourhood with many restaurants and cafés. Many of the yalıs on the coastline are among the most expensive real estate in Istanbul. The Köybaşı Caddesi (Köybaşı Avenue) runs through the neighbourhood close to the Bosphorus shoreline. Besides the historic village, the nearby neighborhoods of Yalılar, Bağlar Mevkii, Kalender, as well as sections of Ferahevler are considered within the borders of Yeniköy.

== Notable buildings and sites ==
The suburb is home to several exclusive yalı houses that used to be owned by the prominent figures of the Ottoman era. The small Osman Reis mosque was built by Alexander Vallaury in 1904 on the site of a 17th-century mosque. Vallaury also designed the yalı of Ahmed Afif Pasha behind it, where Agatha Christie stayed as a guest in 1933 while writing Murder on the Orient Express.

There are several Christian churches in the neighbourhood. The Greek Orthodox church of Dormition of the Mother of God (Panayia Kumariotisa Rum Ortodoks Kilisesi, Koybaşı Cad. No. 108) was built in 1837 at the request of Sultan Mahmud II′s personal physician Stefanos Karatheodori (Greek: Στέφανος Καραθεοδωρής). His and his son Alexander Karatheodori Pasha′s tombstones are next to the wooden bell tower west of the church.

Yeniköy Cemetery is a historic Muslim cemetery.

== Education ==
Yeniköy is served by Yeniköy İlkokulu and Yeniköy Mehmetçik İlköğretim Okulu as its main primary and middle education centers respectively. Tarabya British Schools has its Yeniköy campus there.

== Notable people ==
Peter the Byzantine, who served the Ecumenical Patriarchate of Constantinople as Domestikos, Lambadarios, and Arch-cantor was born here.

The Egyptian Greek poet Constantine Cavafy lived here together with his parents in 1882–1885 as an adolescent; his bust is in the yard of the Panagia church. In his poem "Nichori" (Greek: Το Nιχώρι) (1885), he praises the place.

Tugay apartment building, where Vehbi Koç lived, is also an independent site where celebrities are located.
