= Yalı =

House or mansion built right on the waterside

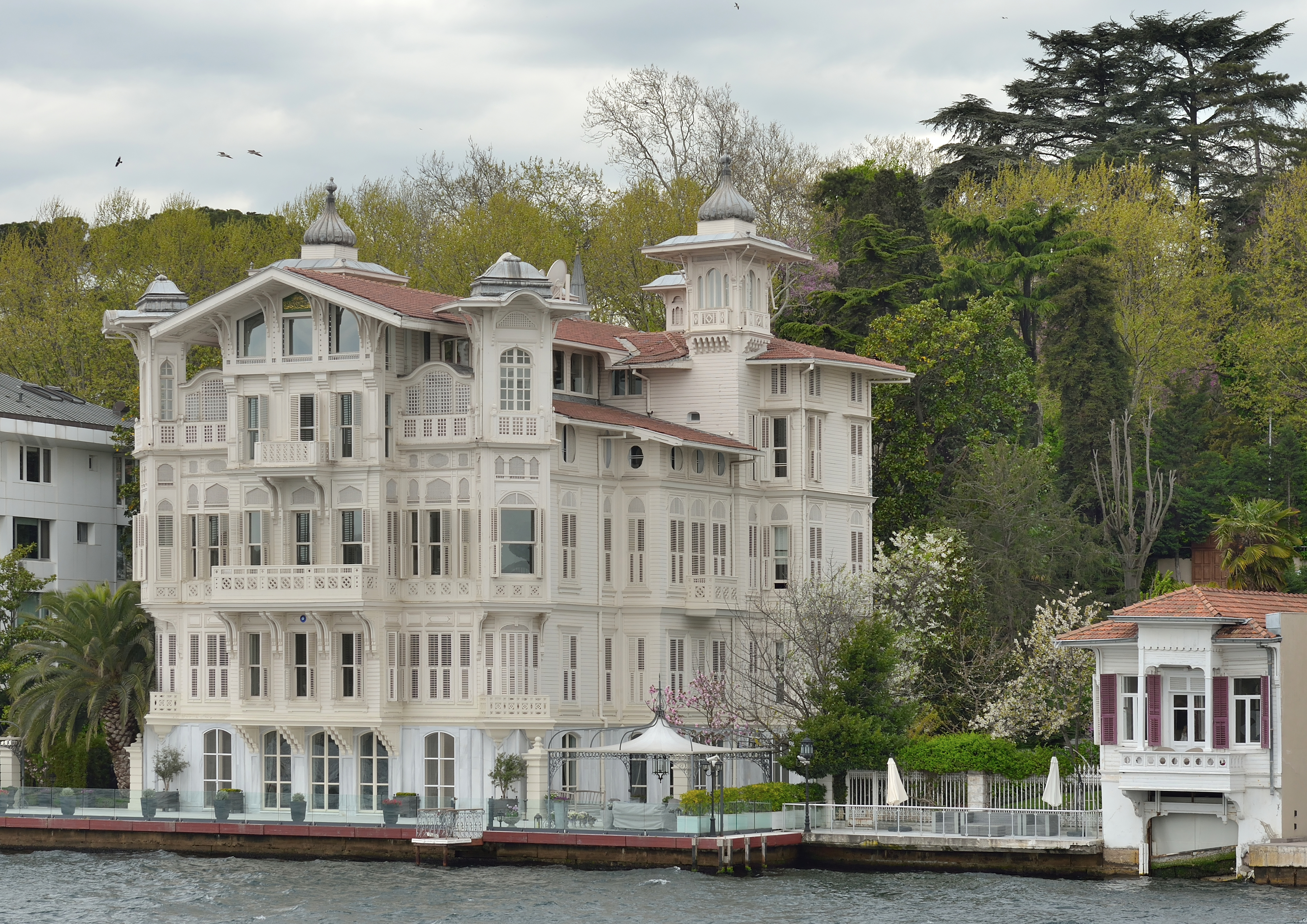
Yalı of Ahmet Afif Pasha in Yeniköy on the European coast of the Bosphorus strait, designed by Alexandre Vallaury.

A yalı (Turkish: yalı, from Greek γιαλή yialí (mod. γιαλός yialós), literally "seashore, beach") is a house or mansion built right on the waterside (almost exclusively seaside, particularly on the Bosphorus strait in Istanbul) and usually built with an architectural concept that takes into account the characteristics of the coastal location. A family who owned a waterside residence would spend some time in this usually secondary residence located at the sea shore, as opposed to the konak ("mansion", aside from the term's use to refer to buildings with administrative functions) or the köşk ("pavilion", often serving a determined practical purpose, such as hunting, or implying a temporary nature). Thus, going to the "yalı" acquired the sense of both going to the seaside and to the house situated there. In its contemporary sense, the term "yalı" is used primarily to denote those 620 waterside residences constructed during the 18th, 19th, and 20th centuries and sprinkled along the Bosphorus in Istanbul. As such, they are one of the area's landmarks.

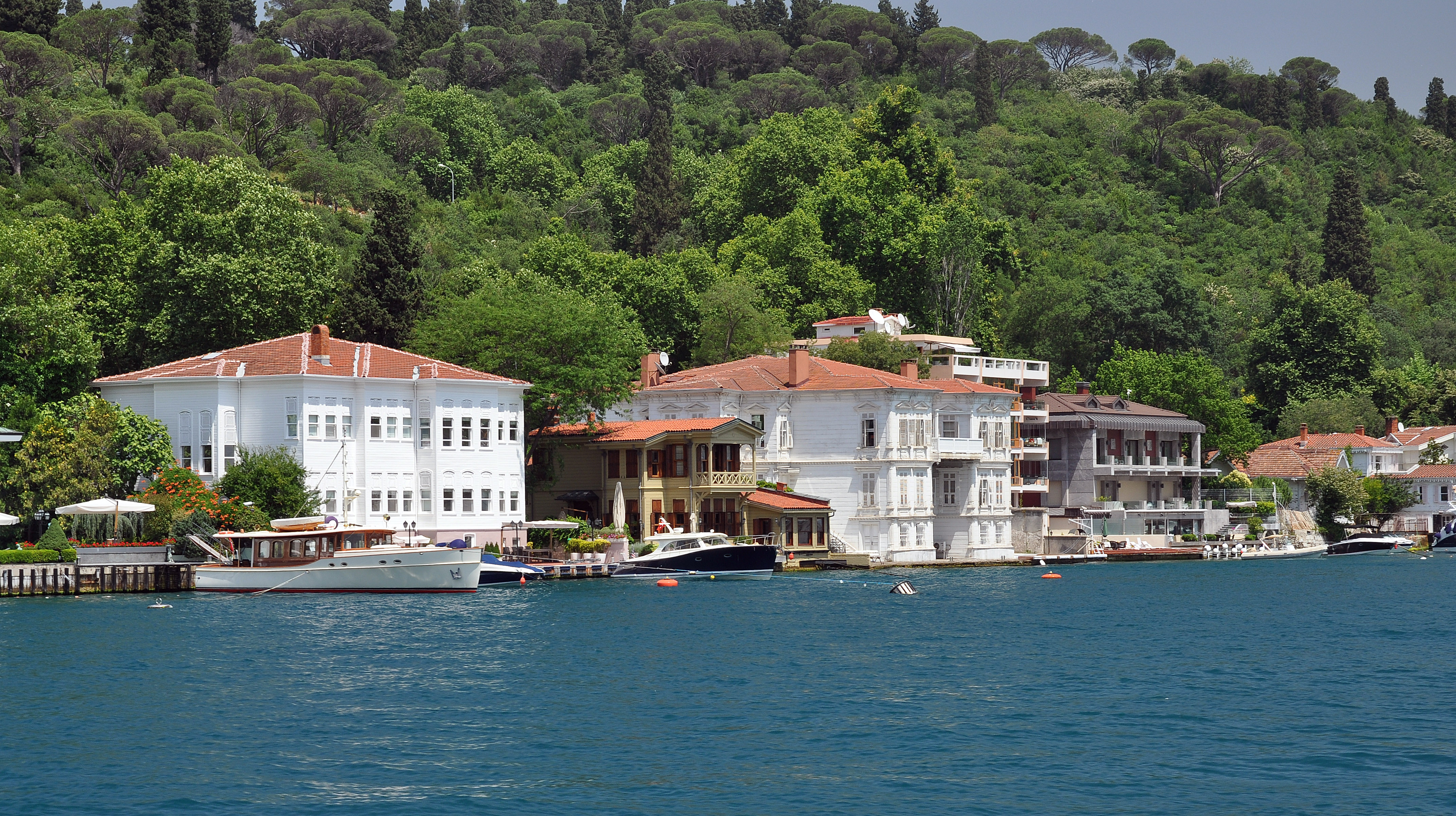
Yağlıkçı Hacı Reşit Bey Yalısı and Prenses Rukiye Yalısı in Kanlıca, along the Anatolian shores of the Bosphorus.

Finely worked wood was the predominant construction material chosen for yalıs, as it was for the large majority of traditional Turkish houses. Successive restorations often caused the wooden parts of the overall structure to be gradually reduced, but wood nevertheless remains the prominent and identifying material of historic yalıs. It is not uncommon for the most recently restored mansions to employ wood principally for external decoration purposes.

The oldest surviving yalı is the one built by the grand vizier Amcazade Köprülü Hüseyin Pasha (of the highly influent Köprülü family) in 1699 at the Kanlıca neighbourhood (within Beykoz district), on the Asiatic shores of the Bosphorus. From this yalı, the hall of audience (divanhane) and its immediate annexes have survived. On the opposite European shores, the oldest to remain is the "Şerifler Yalısı" in the Emirgan neighbourhood (within Sarıyer district), which was built in 1780 but bears the name of a later owner. The most expensive yalı is "Erbilgin Yalısı" located in Yeniköy, Istanbul. In 2007, Forbes magazine listed "Erbilgin Yalısı" as the fifth most expensive house in the world with a price tag of $100 million.

Cornucopia, a magazine about the arts, culture and history of Turkey, has a regular feature on the Bosphorus yalıs, their architecture and their interiors. Notable inclusions have been the Yalı of Kıbrıslı Mehmed Emin Pasha, the Yalı of Ethem Pertev, the Yalı of Saffet Pasha, and the Yalı of Zeki Pasha.

== Image gallery ==
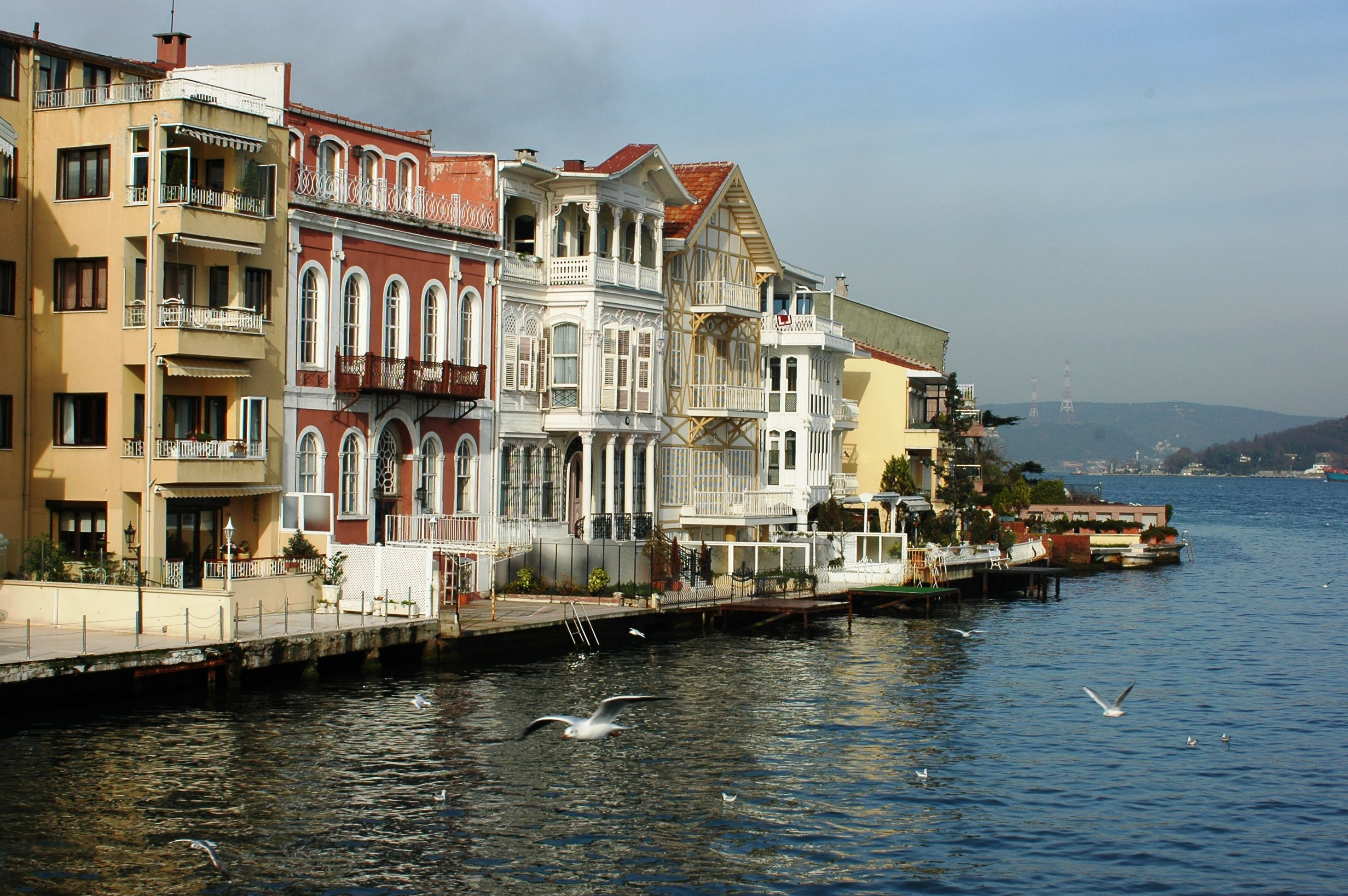
Yeniköy, on the Bosphorus.

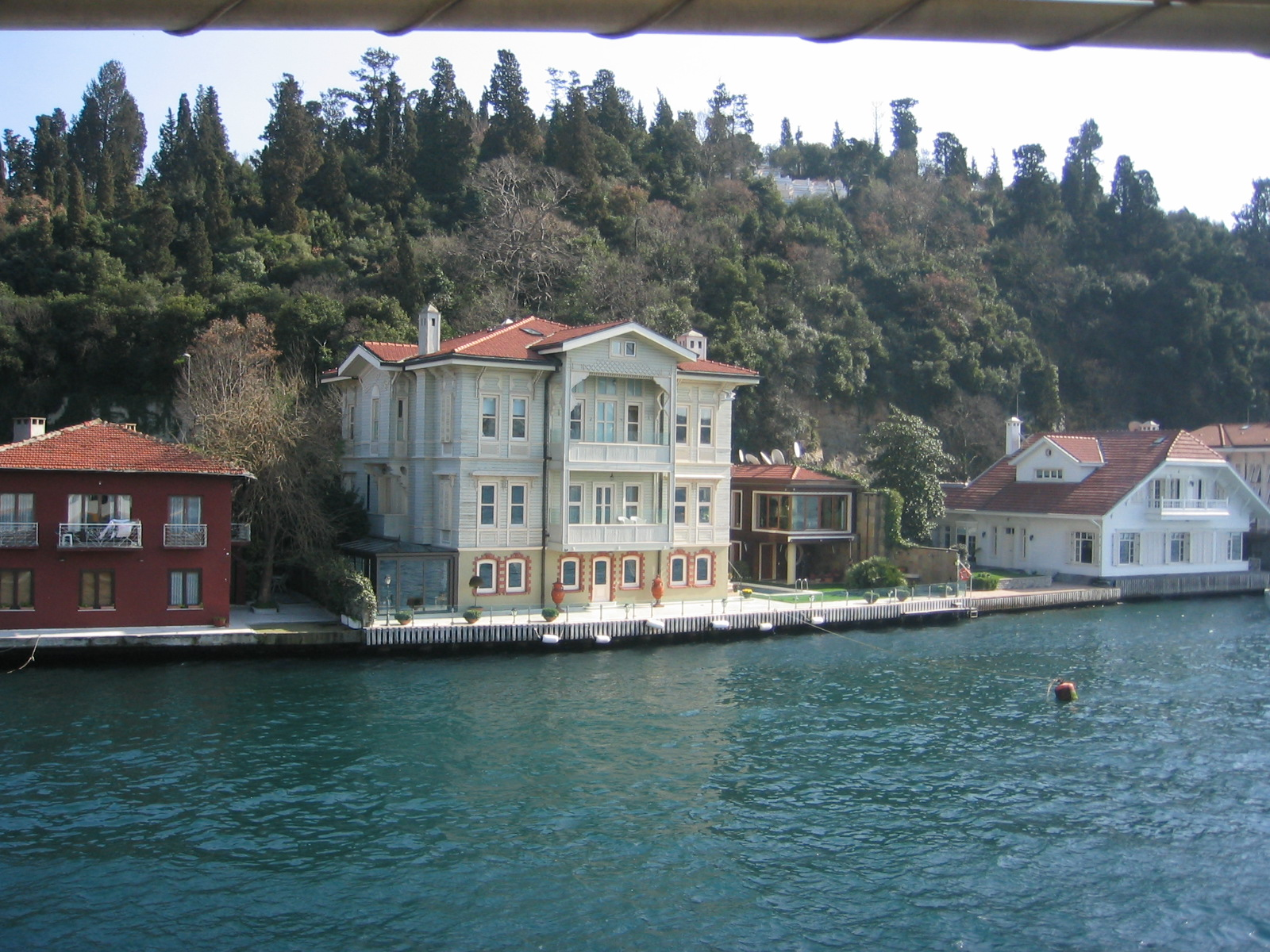
Ottoman era waterfront houses (yalı) on the Bosphorus.

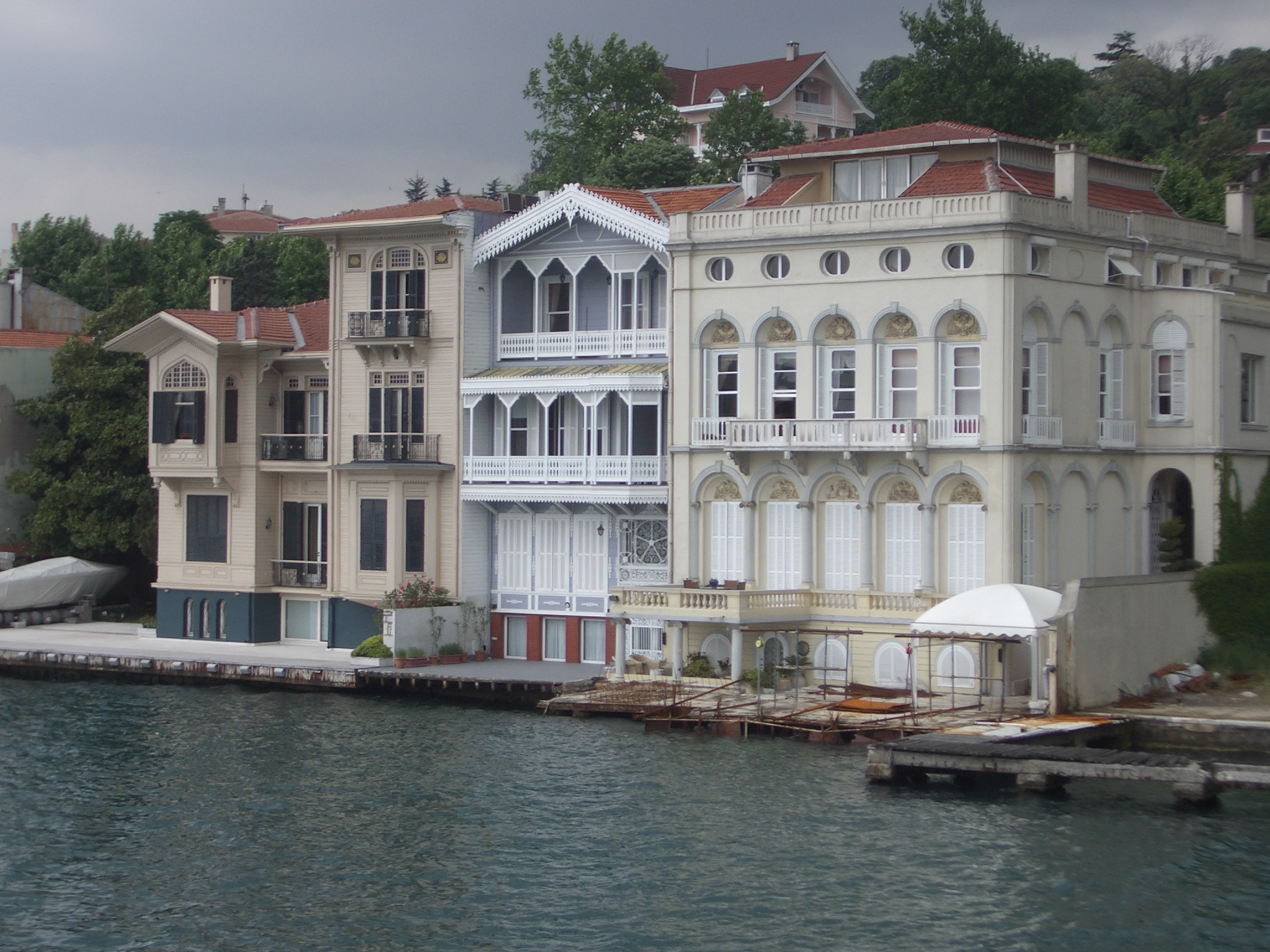
Ottoman era waterfront houses (yalı) on the Bosphorus.

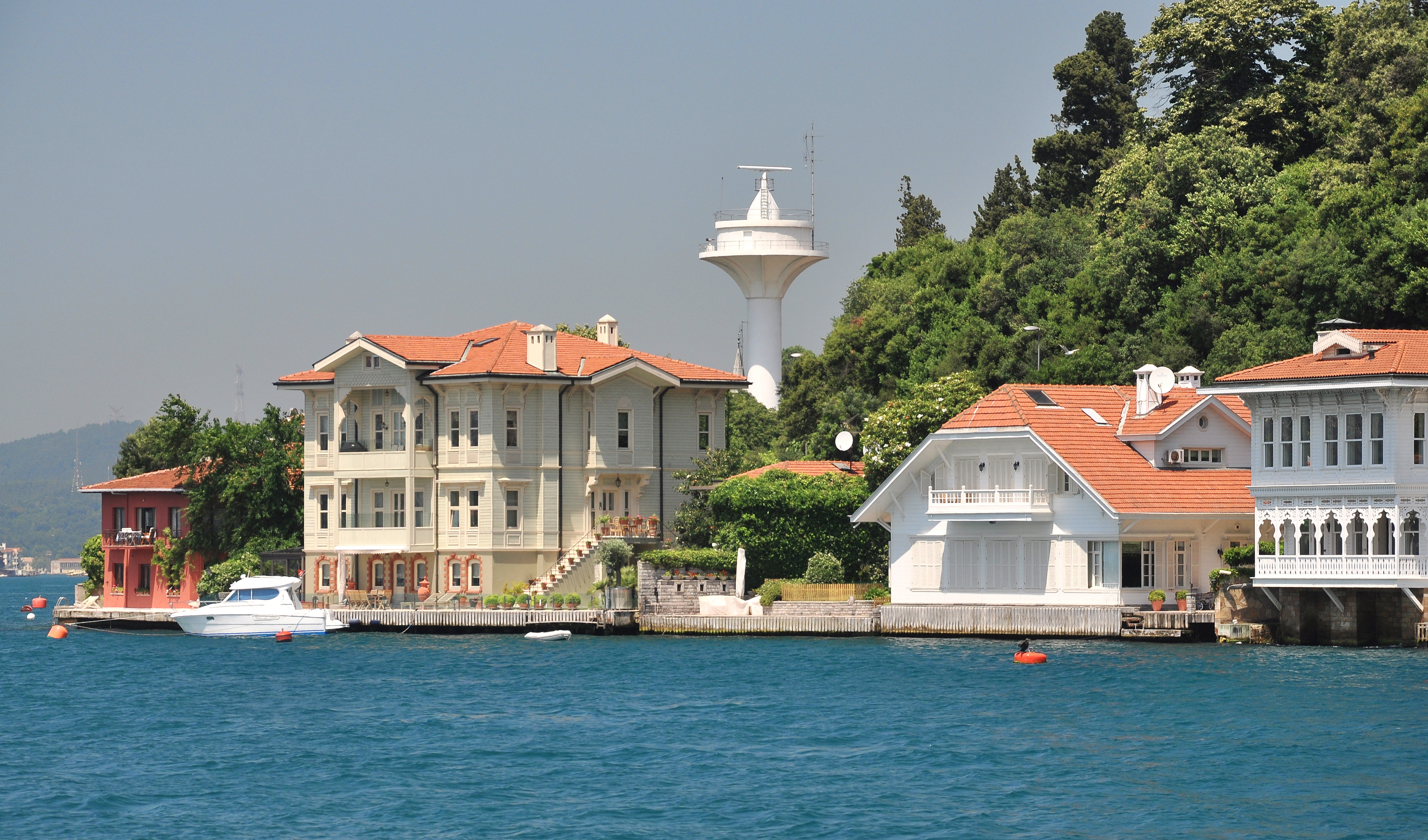
Ottoman era waterfront houses (yalı) on the Bosphorus.

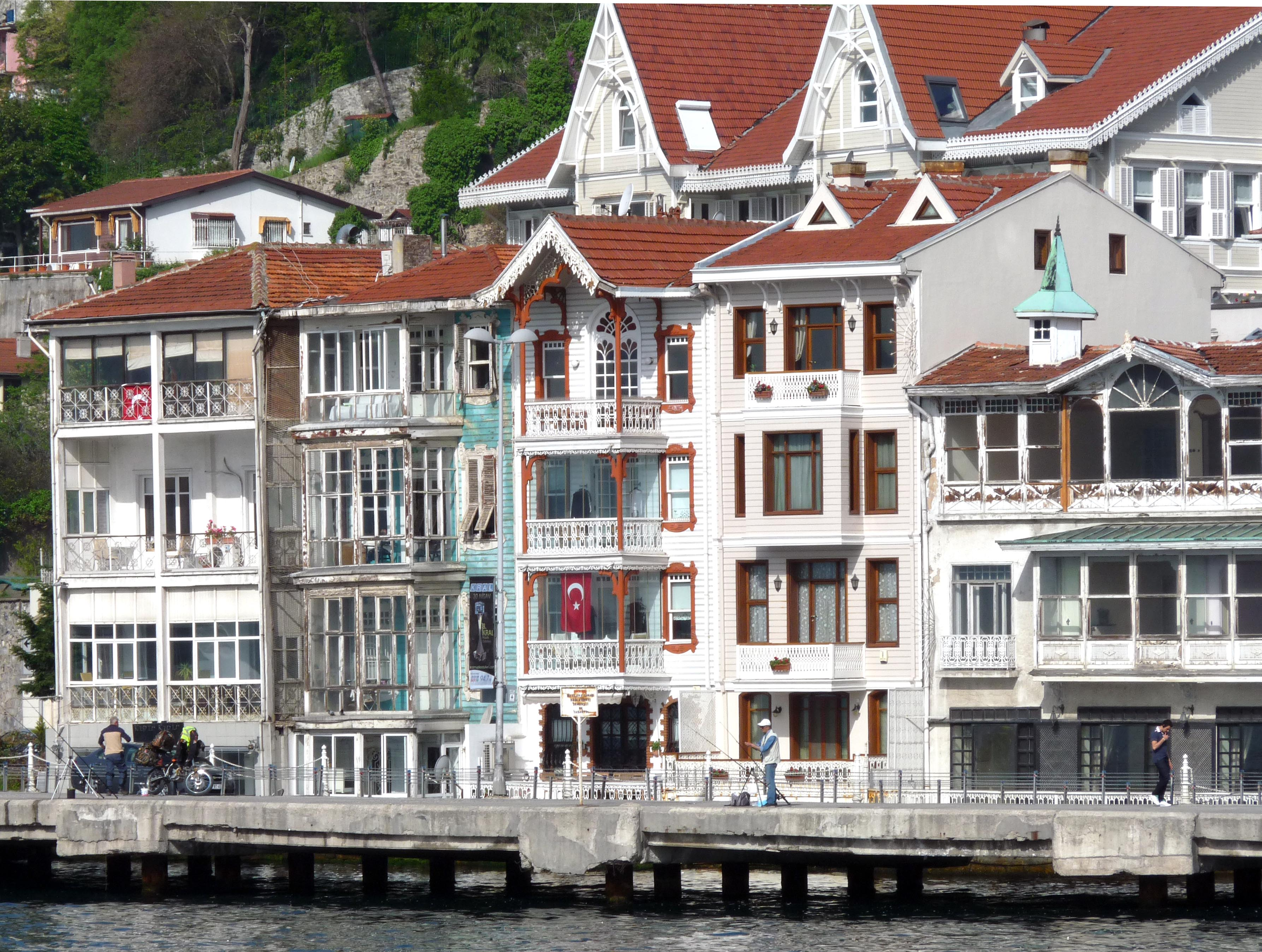
Ottoman era waterfront houses (yalı) on the Bosphorus.

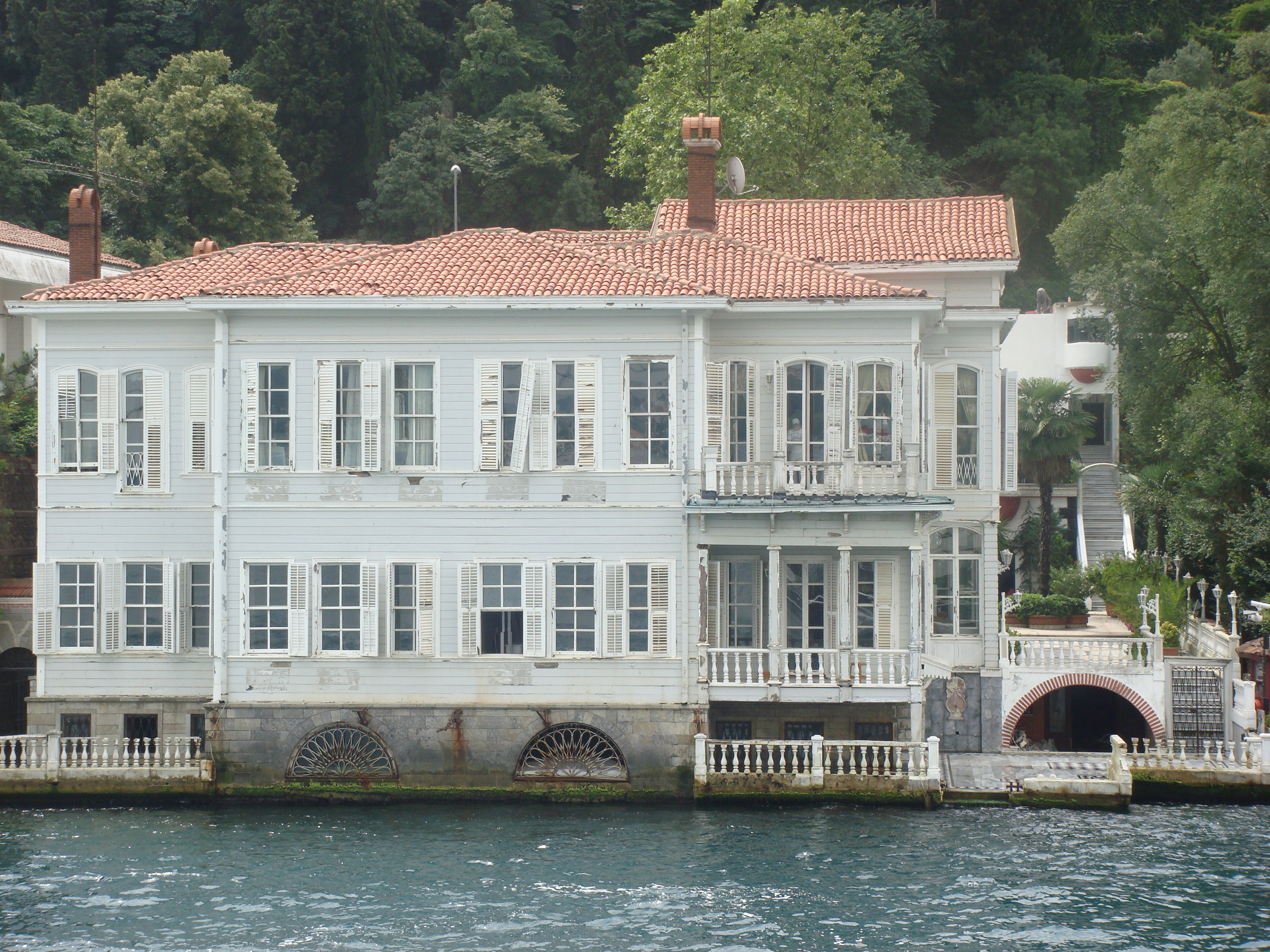
Ottoman era waterfront house (yalı) on the Bosphorus.

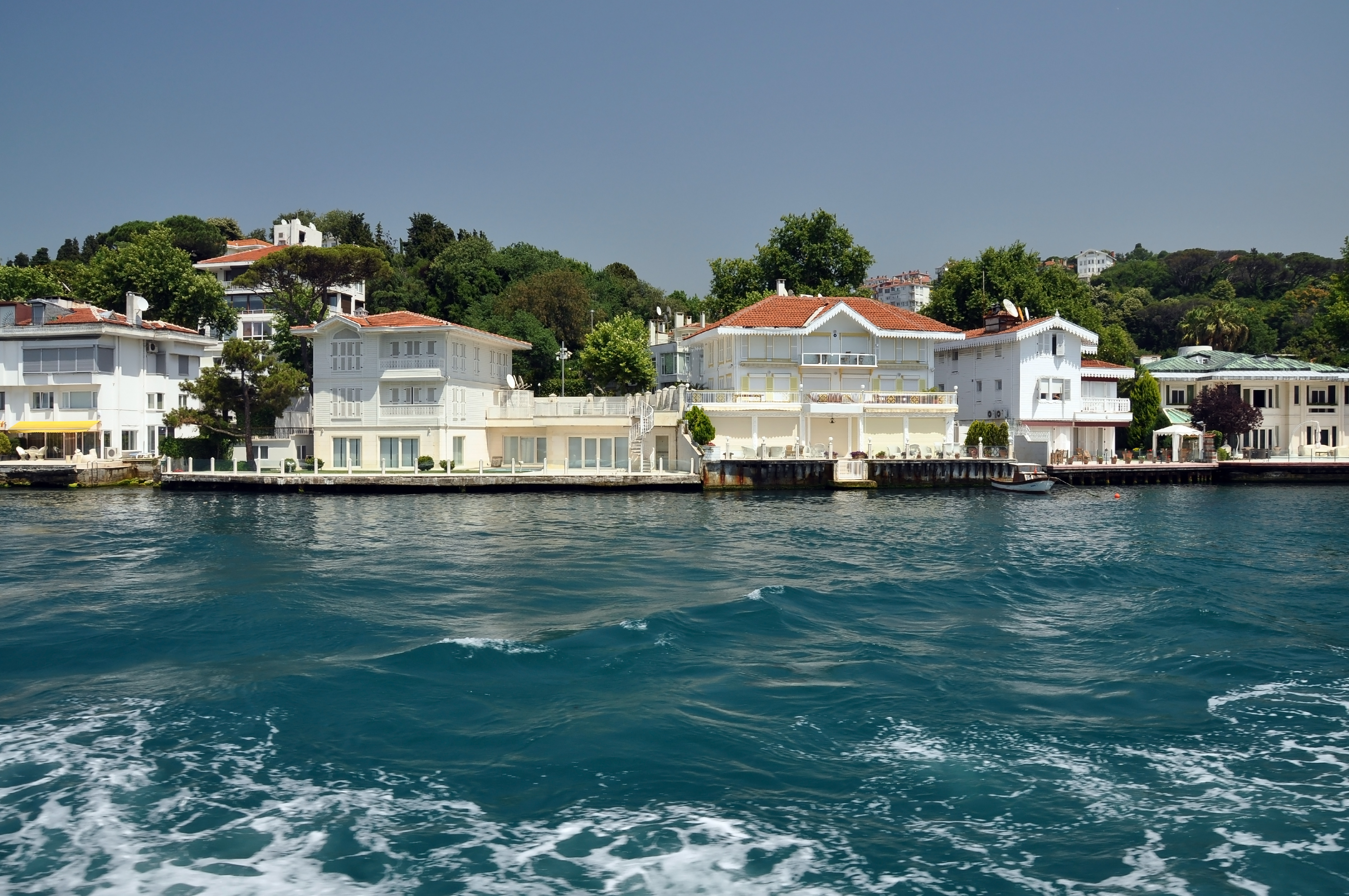
Elbiseci Ahmet Bey Yalısı and Esra Umur Yalısı in Kanlıca on the Bosphorus.

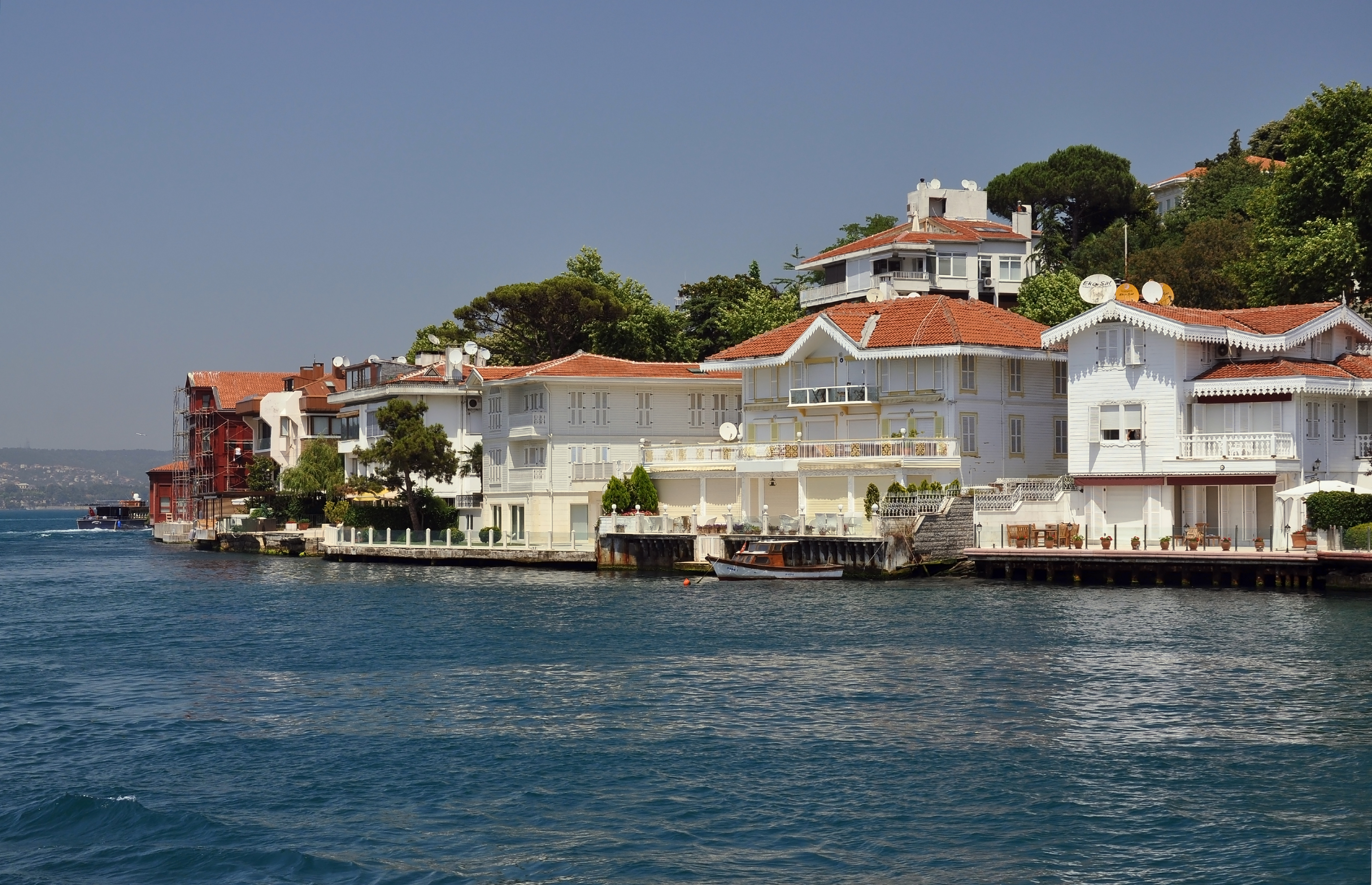
Esra Umur Yalısı and Necati Bey Yalısı in Kanlıca on the Bosphorus.

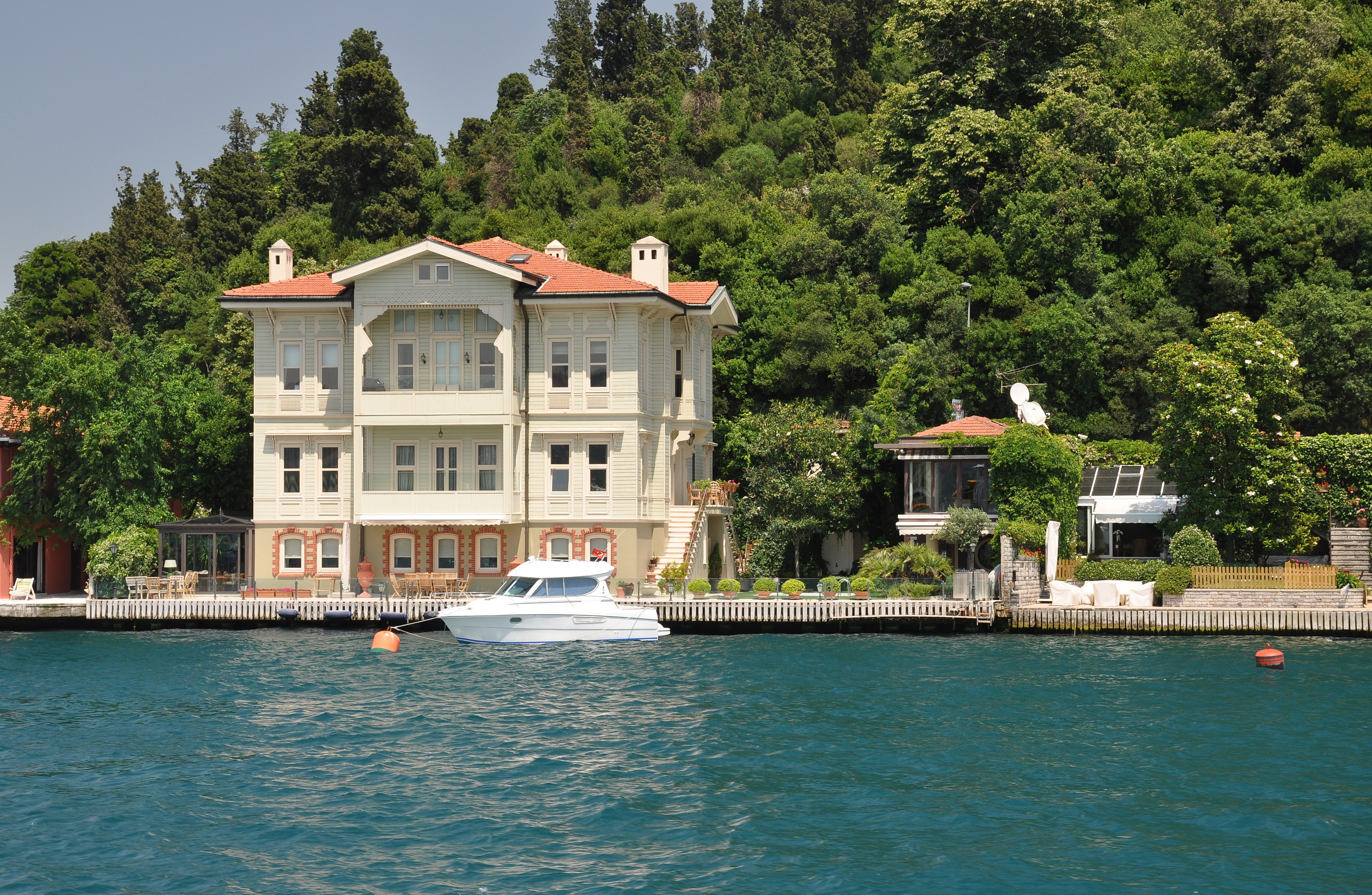
Hacı Ahmet Bey Yalısı in Kanlıca on the Bosphorus.

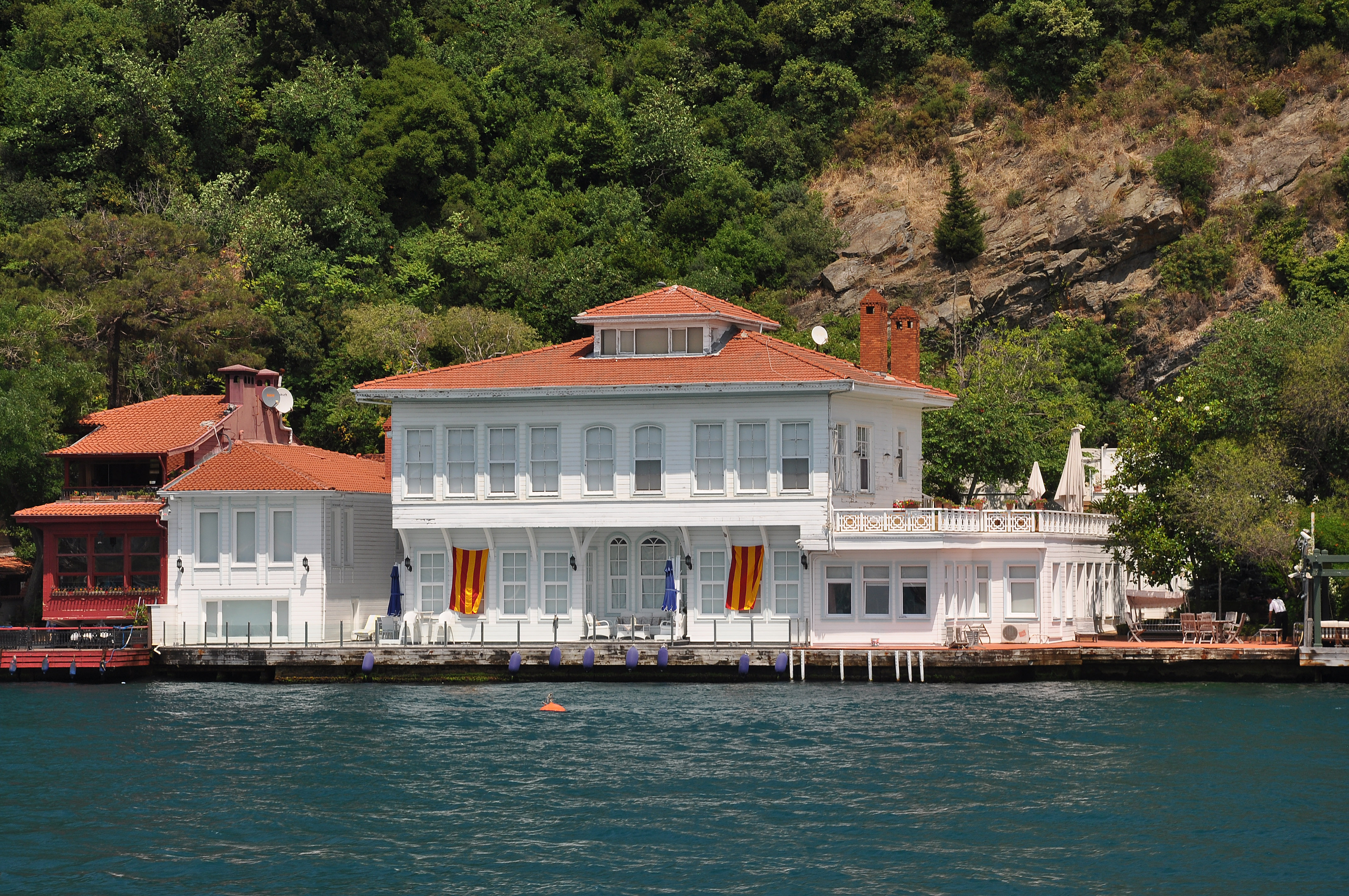
Sadrazam Kadri Paşa Yalısı in Kanlıca on the Bosphorus.

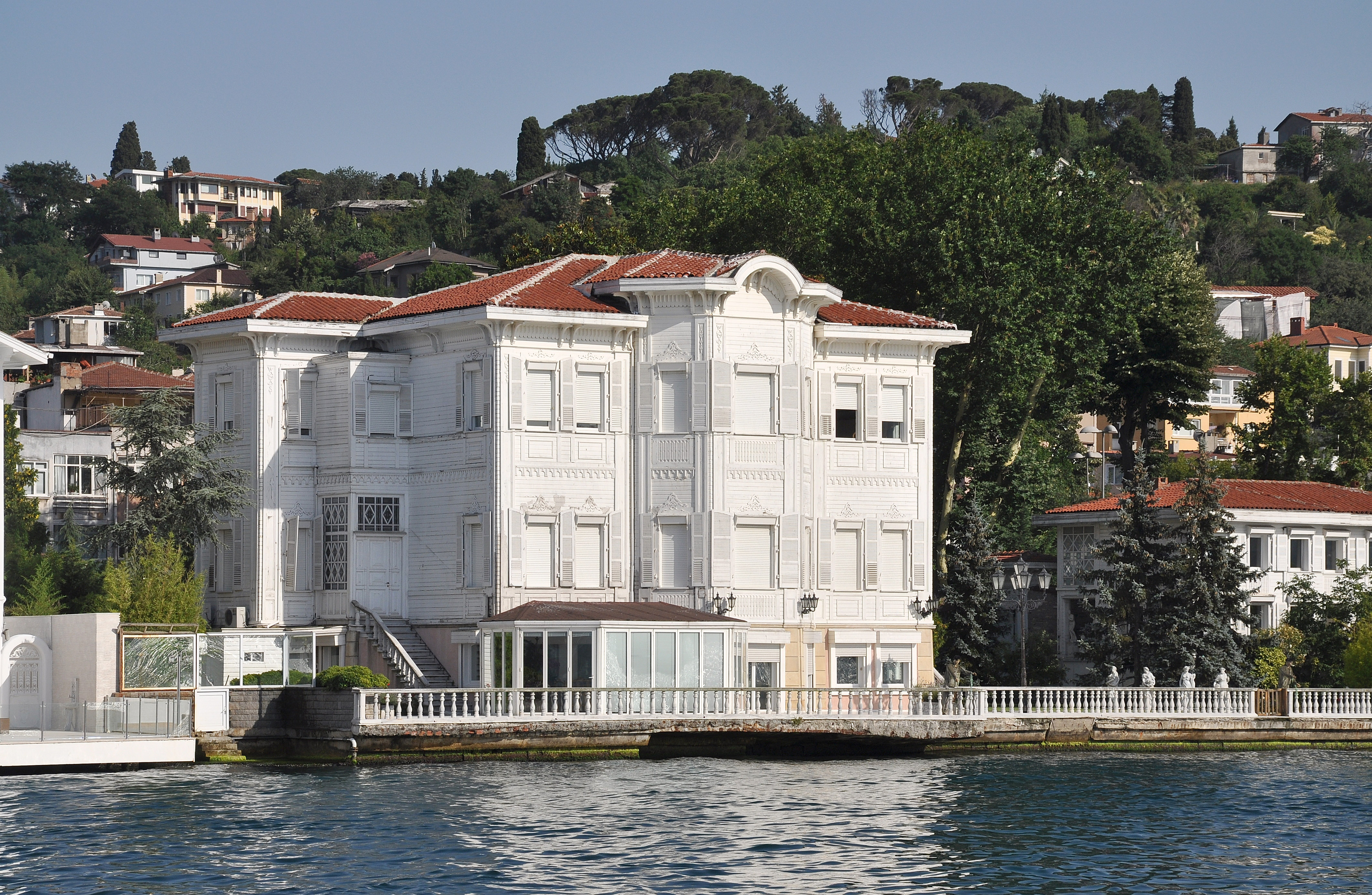
Yağcı Hacı Şefik Bey Yalısı in Kanlıca on the Bosphorus.

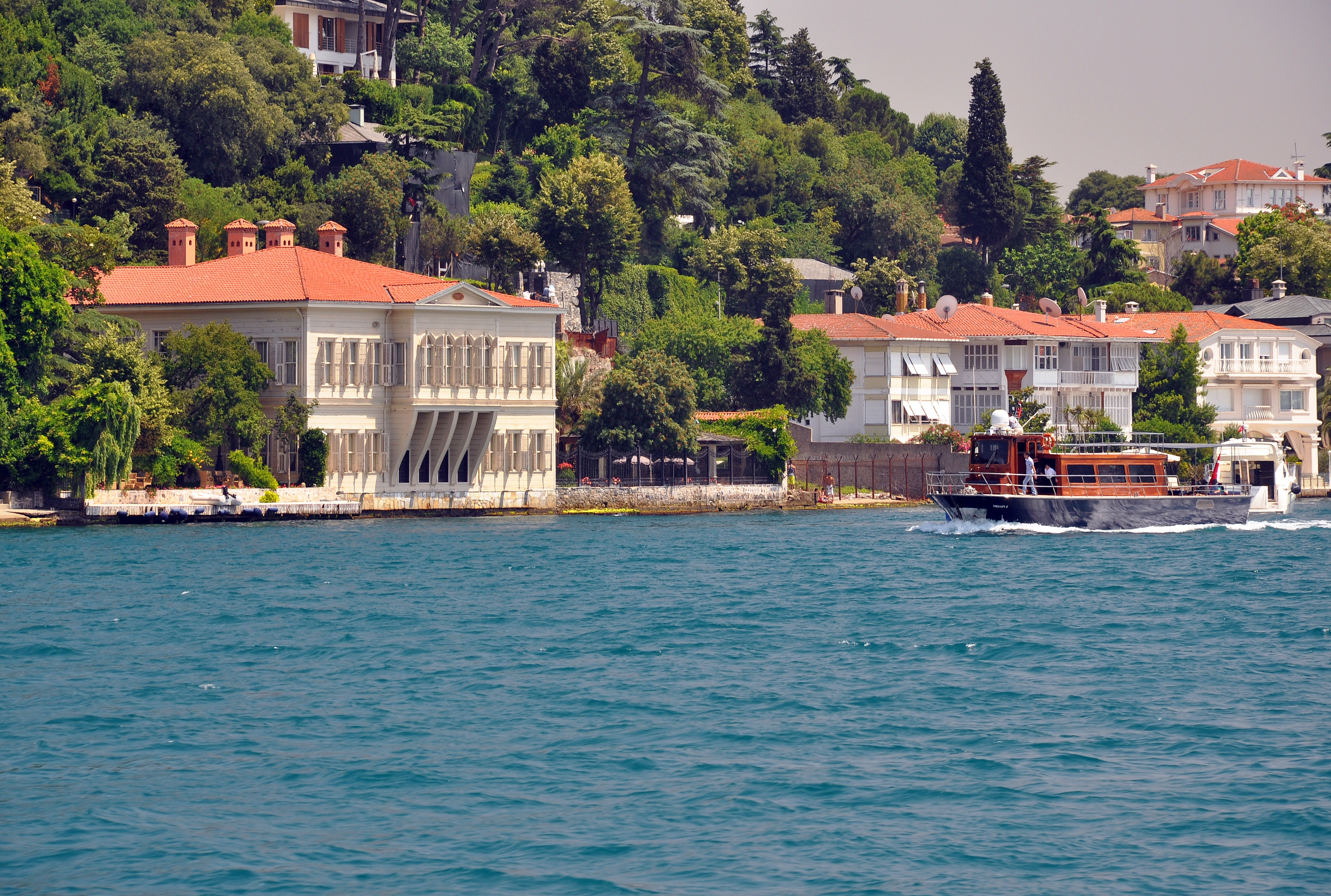
Zarif Mustafa Paşa Yalısı in Kanlıca on the Bosphorus.

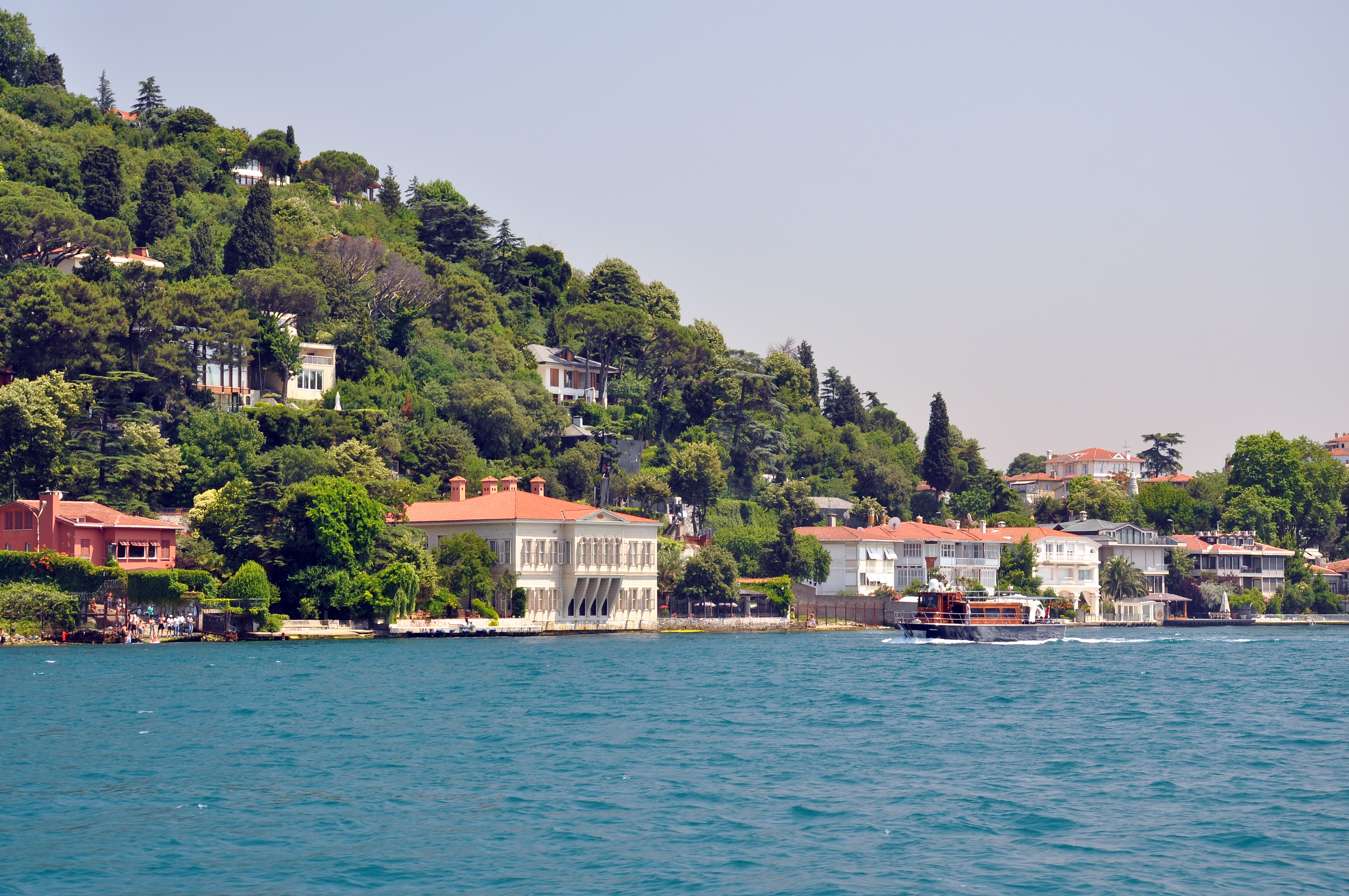
Zarif Mustafa Paşa Yalısı in Kanlıca on the Bosphorus.

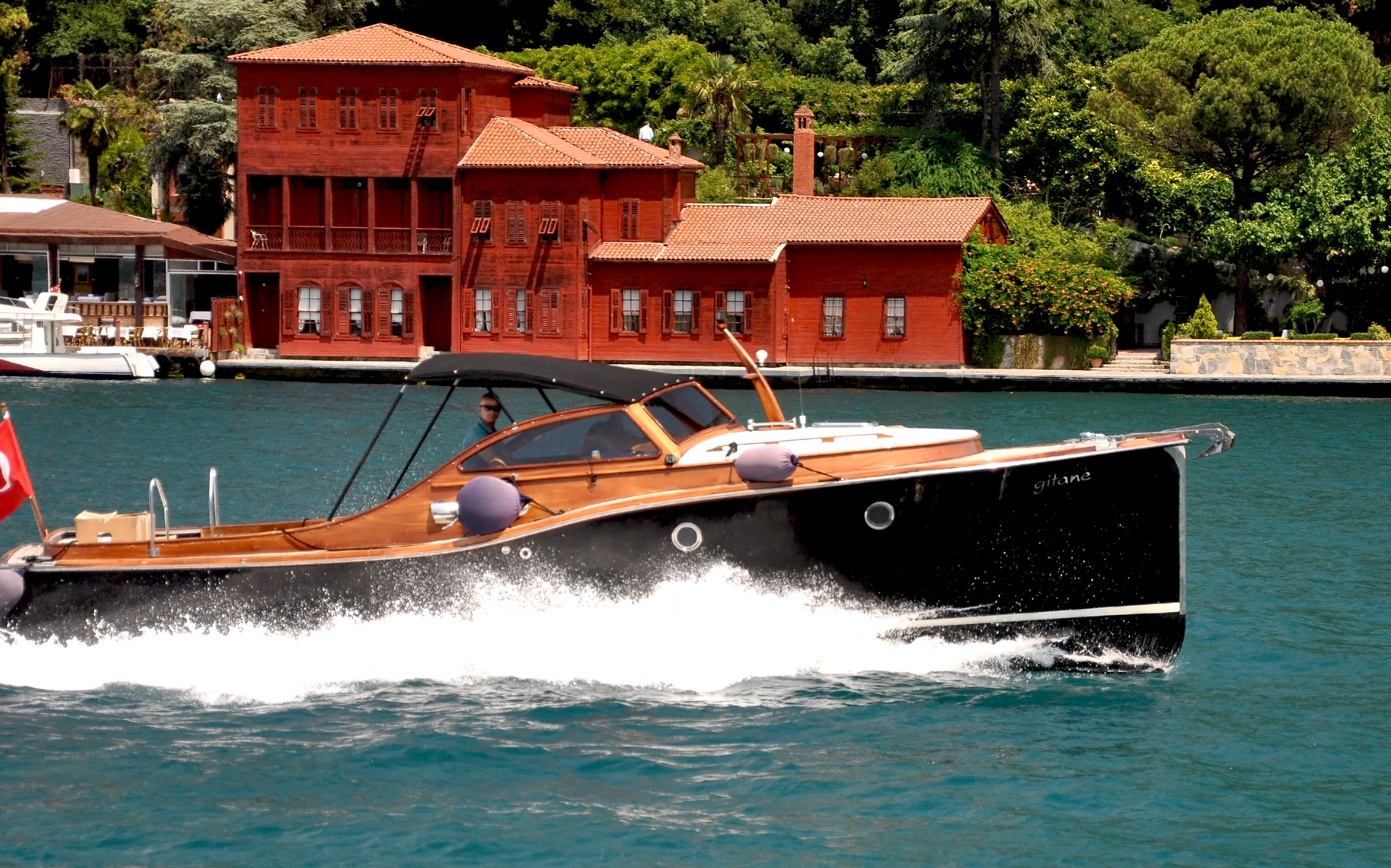
Hekimbaşı Salih Efendi Yalısı in Kanlıca on the Bosphorus, before being damaged in 2018

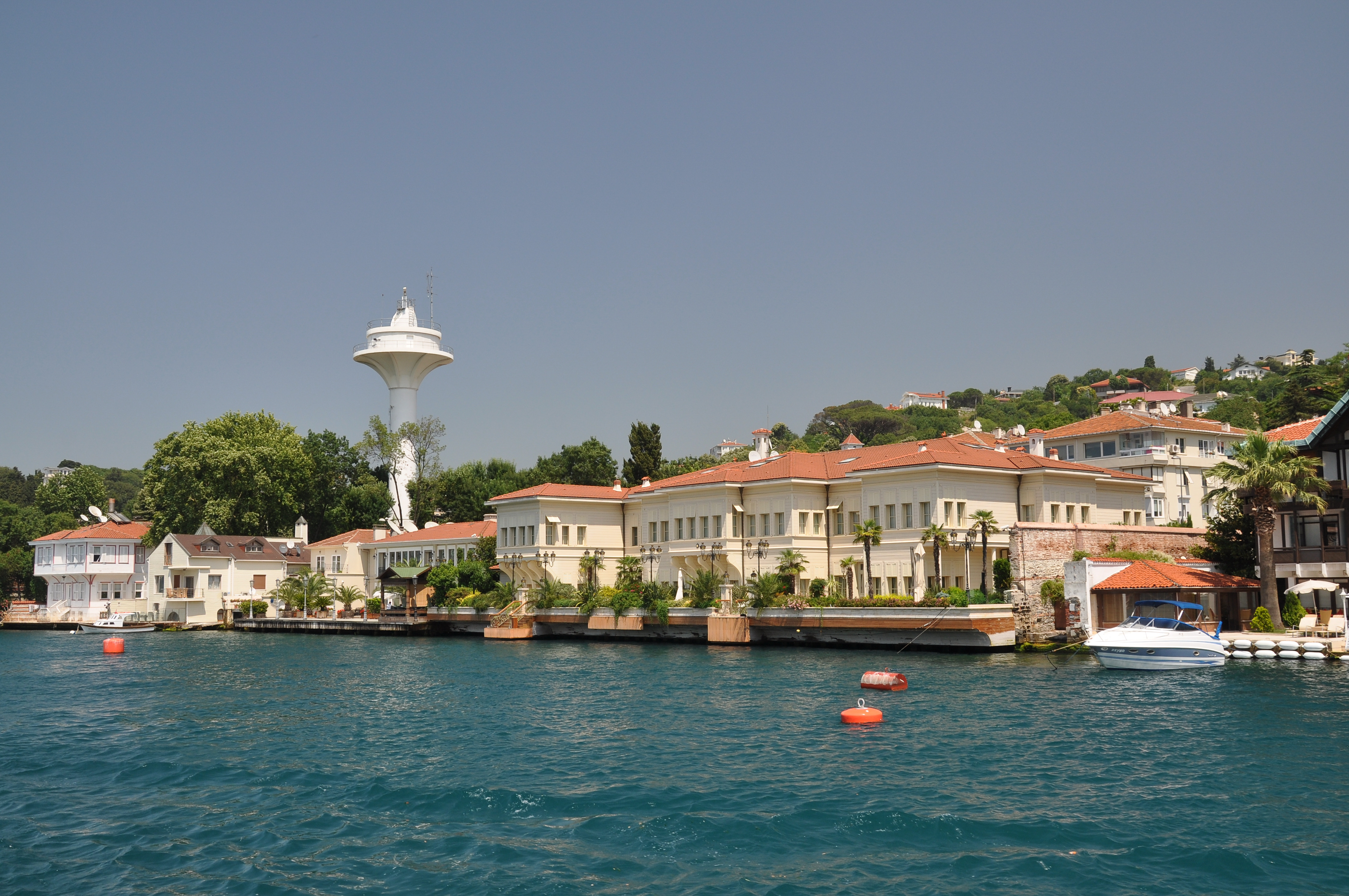
Saffet Paşa Yalısı in Kanlıca on the Bosphorus.

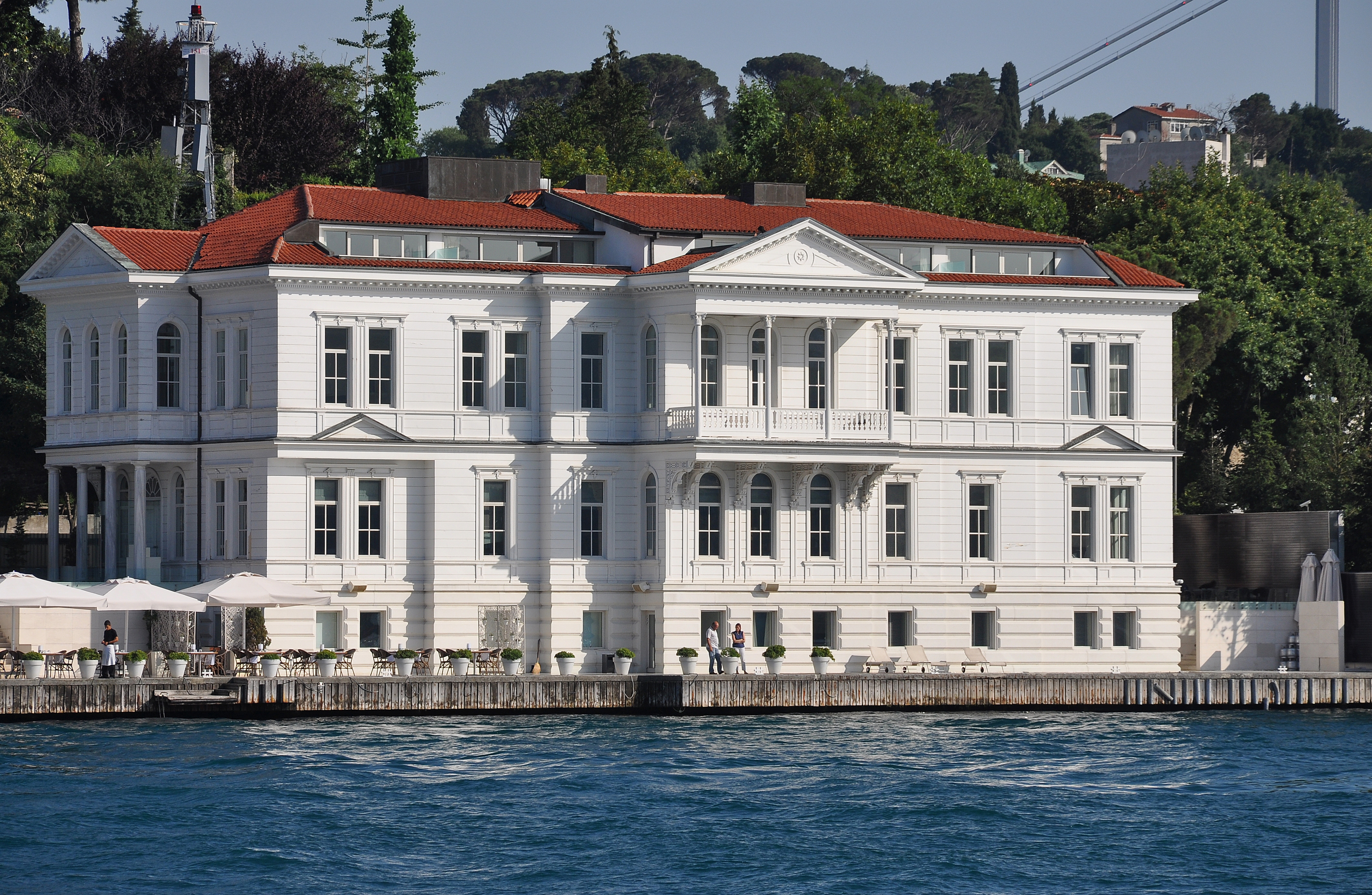
Yalı of Ahmet Rasim Pasha in Kanlıca on the Bosphorus.

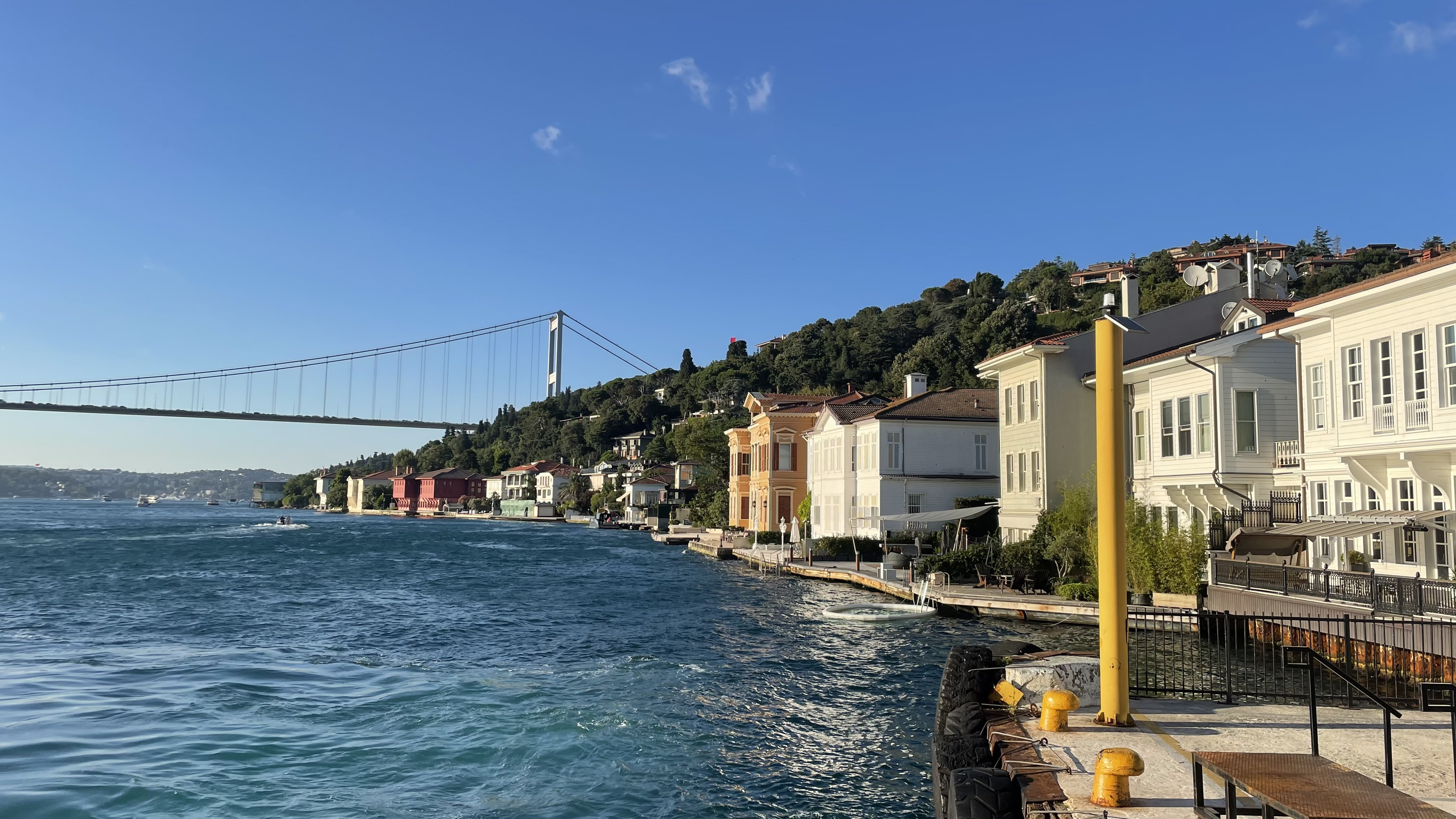
Kandilli, on the Bosphorus.

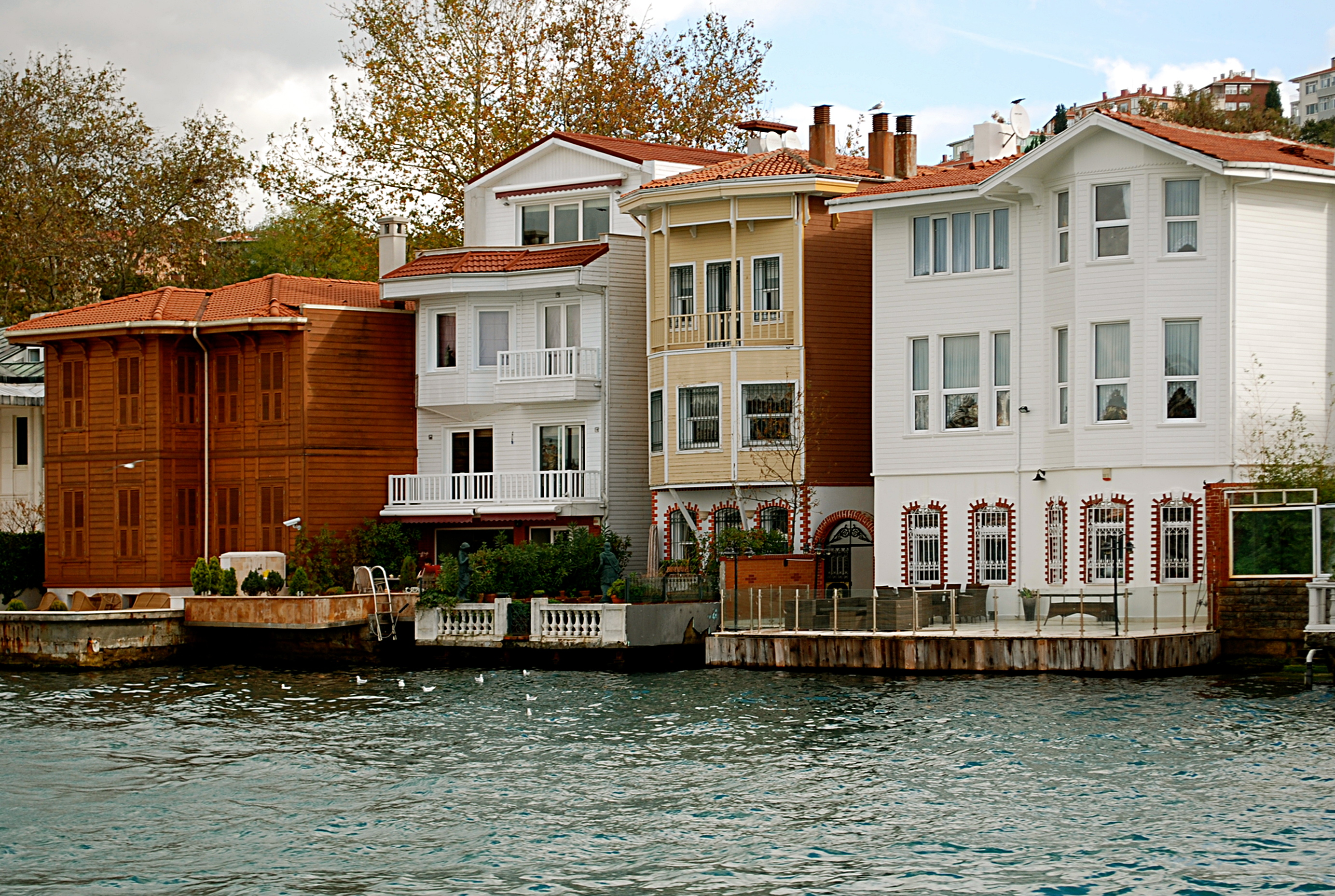
Kanlıca, on the Bosphorus.

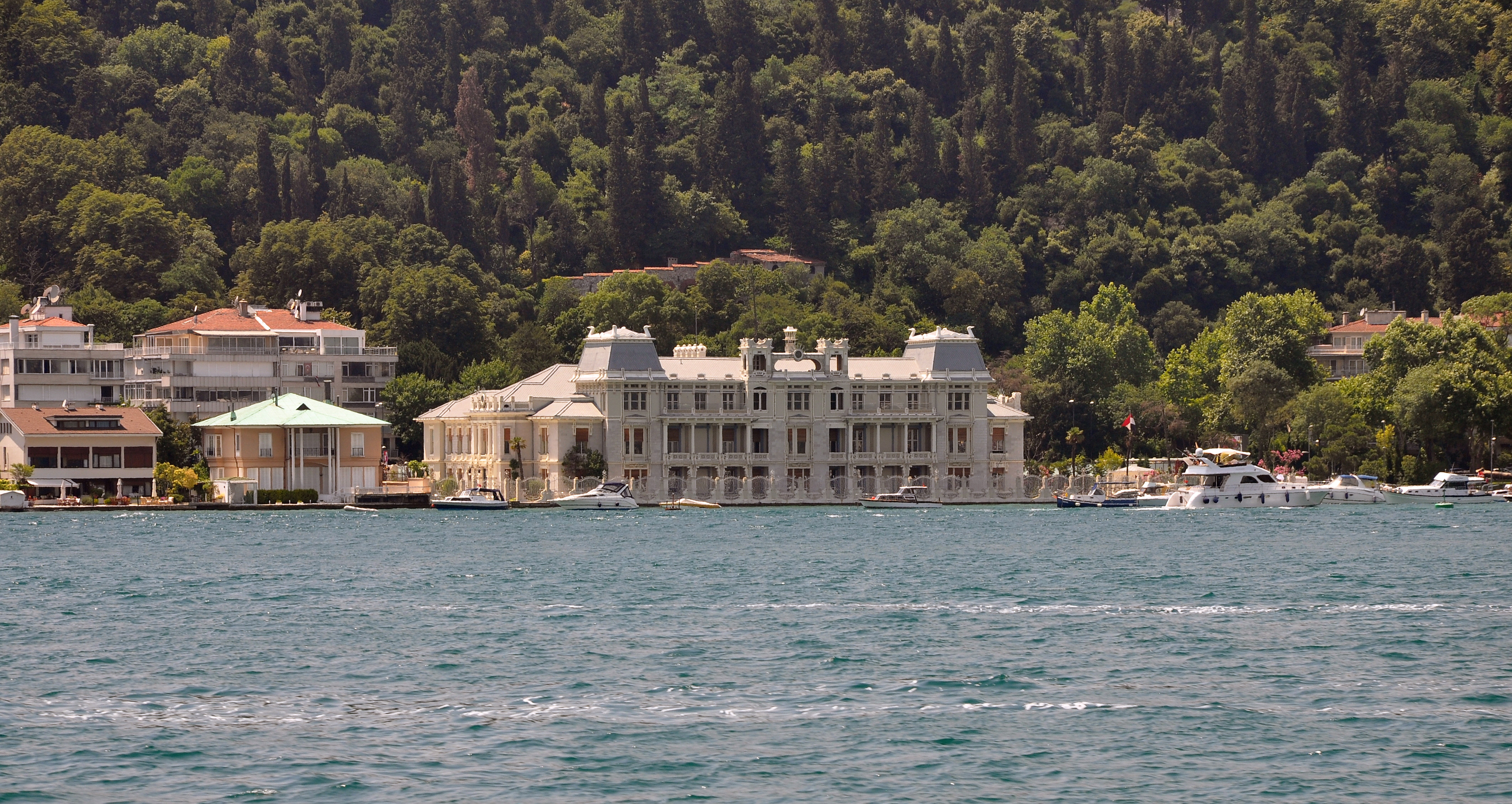
Yalı of Âli Pasha (currently the Egyptian Consulate) in Bebek on the Bosphorus.

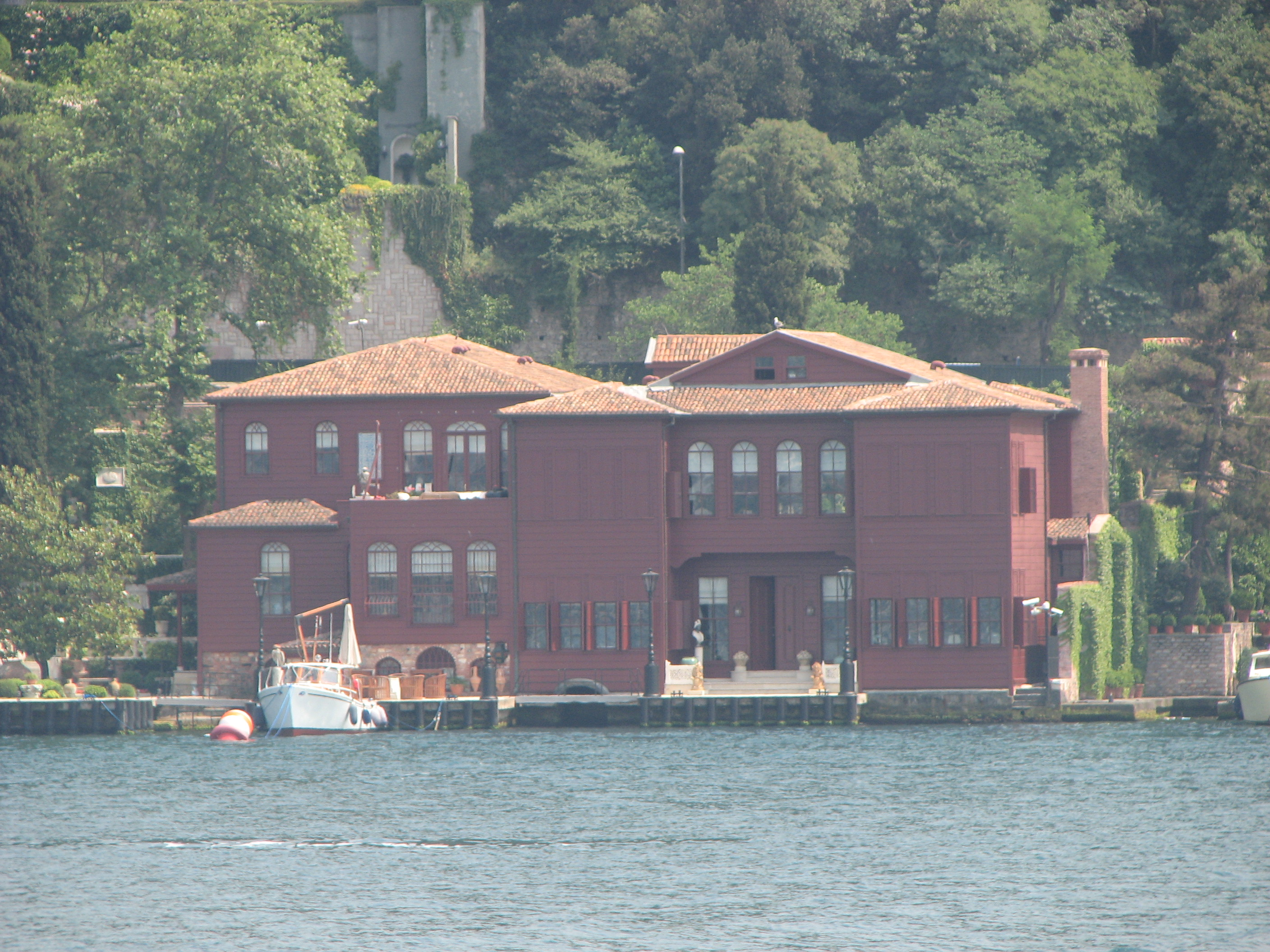
Yalı of Count Ostrorog on the Bosphorus.

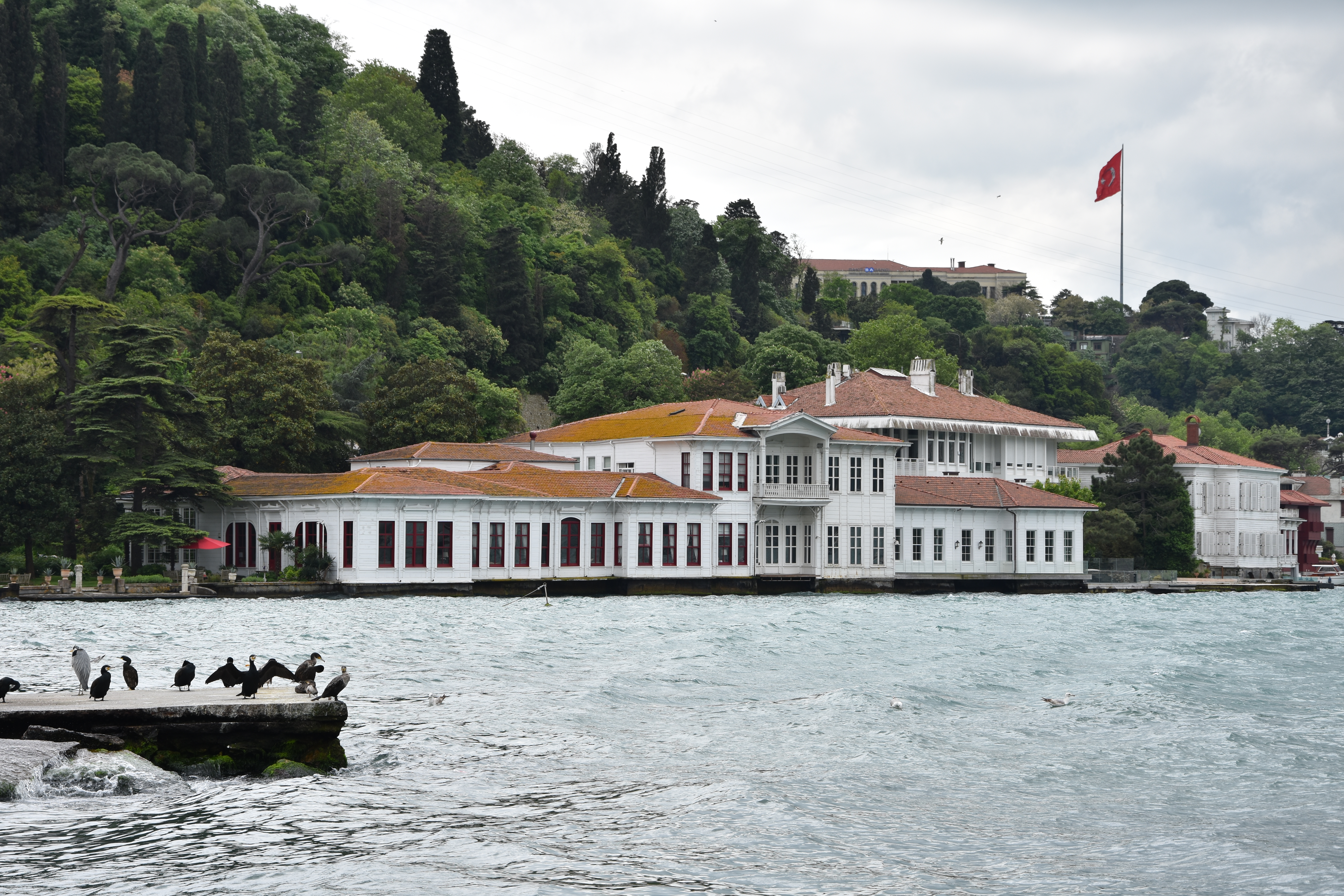
Yalı of Kıbrıslı Mehmed Emin Pasha in Kandilli on the Bosphorus.

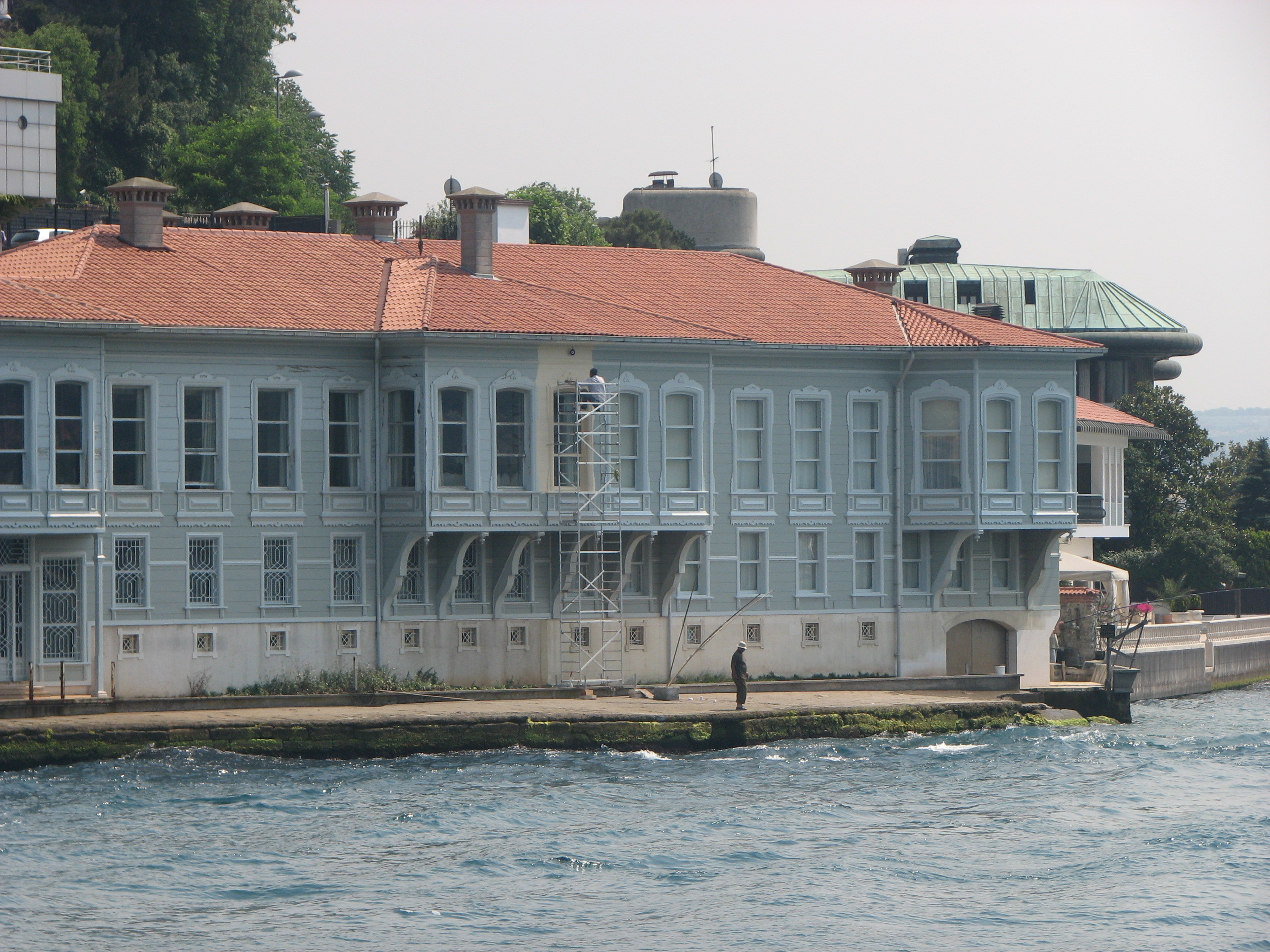
Edib Efendi Yalısı in Kandilli on the Bosphorus.

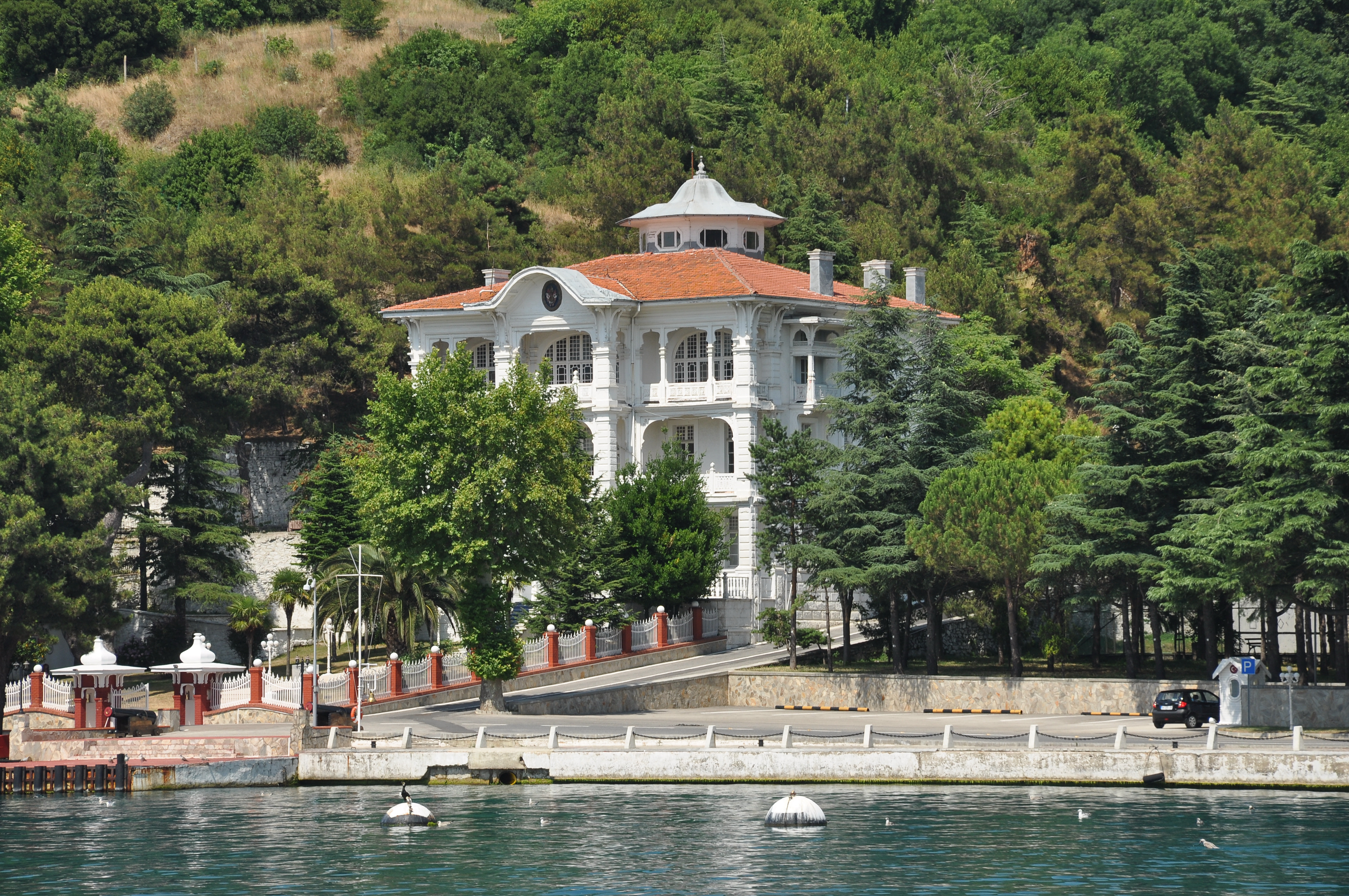
A yalı in Anadolu Kavağı on the Bosphorus.

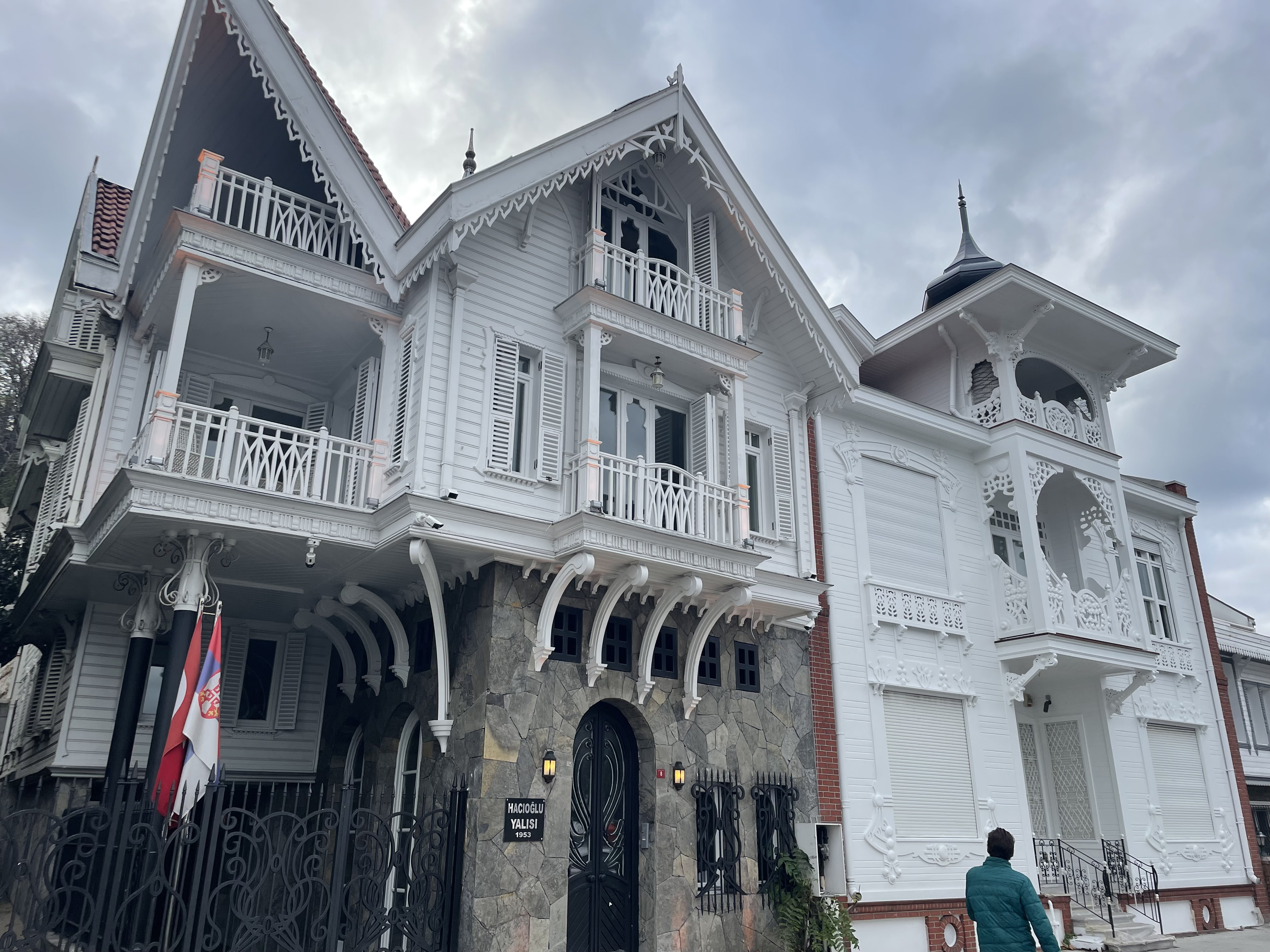
Yalı on the European side

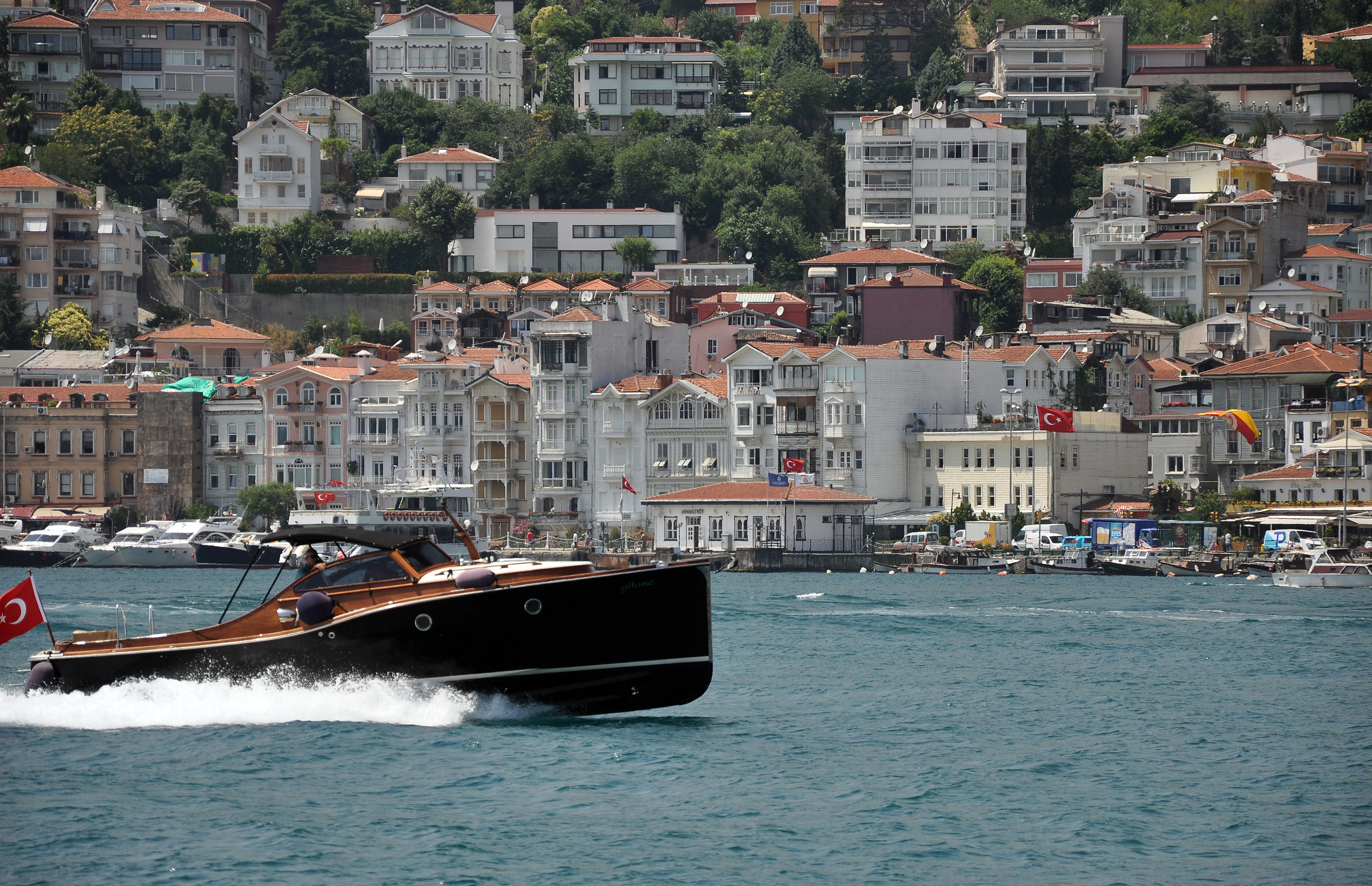
Arnavutköy, on the Bosphorus.

== See also ==
- Esma Sultana Mansion
- Ottoman architecture
