= Irmak Nature Park =

Nature park in Sarıyer, Istanbul, Turkey

- Irmak Tabiat Parkı
- Location within Istanbul
- Location: Bahçeköy, Sarıyer, Istanbul Province, Turkey
- Coordinates: 41°10′47″N 28°58′29″E
- Area: 10 ha (25 acres)
- Established: 2011
- Governing body: Directorate-General of Nature Protection and National Parks; Ministry of Environment and Forest

Irmak Nature Park (Turkish: Irmak Tabiat Parkı) is a nature park located in Sarıyer district of Istanbul Province, Turkey.

Irmak Nature Park is situated across Kirazlıbent Nature Park inside the Belgrad Forest and is west of Bahçeköy, Sarıyer. The area was declared a nature park by the Ministry of Environment and Forest in 2011, and is one of the nine nature parks inside the Belgrad Forest. It covers an area of about 10 ha (25 acres). The protected area is named for the creek (Turkish: Irmak) running through the protected area.

The nature park offers outdoor recreation activities such as hiking, cycling and picnicing for visitors on daily basis.[2] There are playgrounds for children. Admission is charged for visitors and vehicles.

== Ecosystem ==
Flora

Vegetation of the nature park is dense wood of deciduous trees comprising sessile oak (Quercus petraea), Kasnak oak (Quercus vulcanica), hornbeam (Carpinus betulus), European alder (Alnus glutinosa), sweet chestnut (Castanea sativa), blackthorn (Prunus spinosa), laurestine (Viburnum tinus), common ivy (Hedera helix), butcher's-broom (Ruscus aculeatus) and blackberry (Rubus).

Fauna

Animals mainly observed in the Belgrad Forest are wild boar, golden jackal, deer, roe deer, fox, gray wolf, marten, hare, squirrel, porcupine, wood mouse, the reptile tortoise and the bird species buzzard, hawk, magpie, crow, woodpecker, passer, finch and goldfinch.

== See also ==
- Ayvat Bendi Nature Park
- Bentler Nature Park
- Falih Rıfkı Atay Nature Park
- Fatih Çeşmesi Nature Park
- Kirazlıbent Nature Park
- Kömürcübent Nature Park
- Mehmet Akif Ersoy Nature Park
- Neşet Suyu Nature Park
