= Kirazlıbent Nature Park =

Nature park in Eyüp, Istanbul, Turkey

- Kirazlıbent Tabiat Parkı
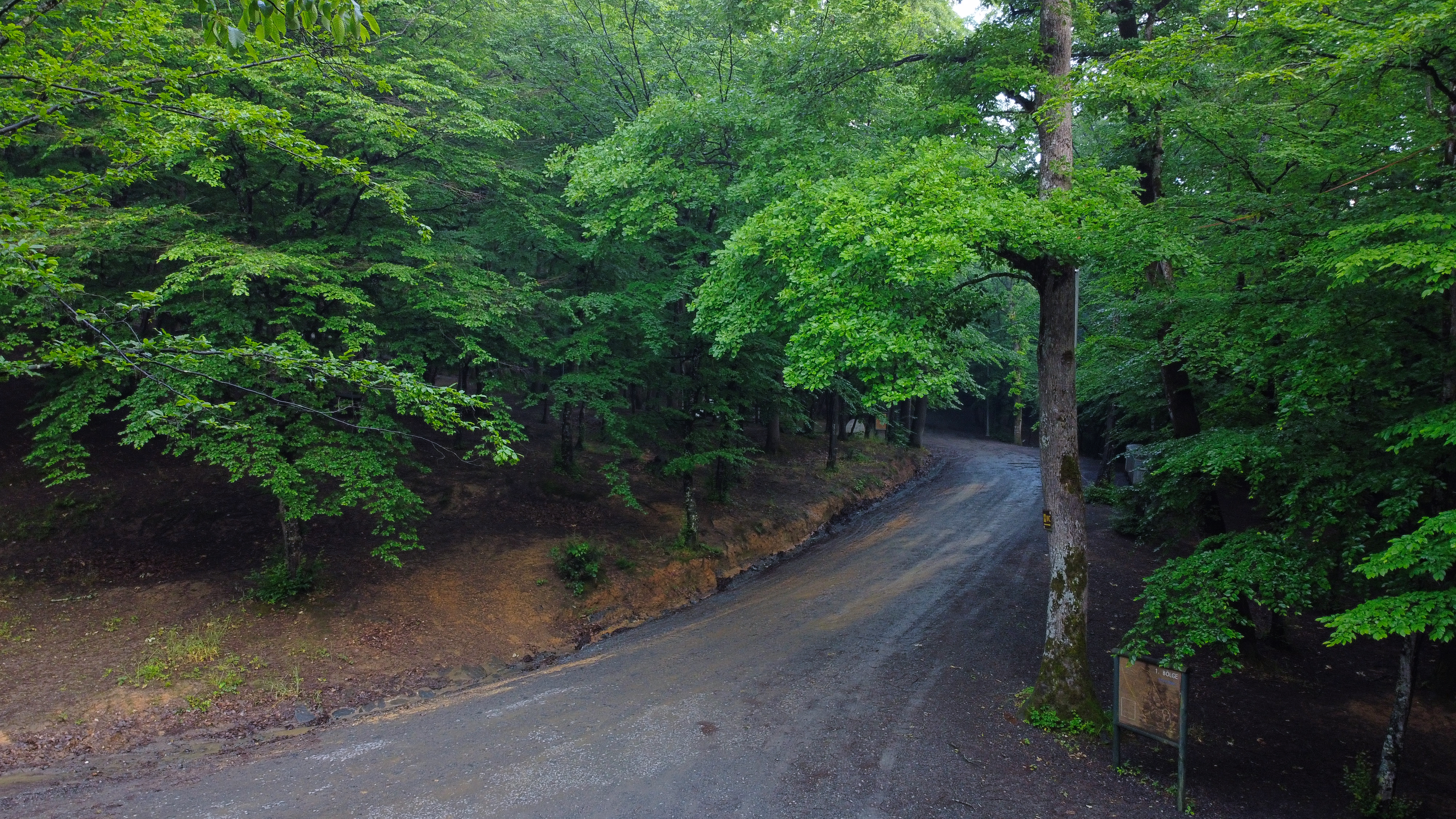

- Location within Istanbul
- Location: Kemerburgaz, Eyüp, Istanbul Province, Turkey
- Coordinates: 41°10′13″N 28°57′46″E
- Area: 19.14 ha (47.3 acres)
- Established: 2011
- Governing body: Directorate-General of Nature Protection and National Parks; Ministry of Environment and Forest

Kirazlıbent Nature Park (Turkish: Kirazlıbent Tabiat Parkı) is a nature park located in the Eyüp district of Istanbul Province, Turkey.

Kirazlıbent Nature Park is situated inside the Belgrad Forest in Eyüp. It is about 6 km (3.7 mi) in distance west of Bahçeköy and east of Kemerburgaz. The area was declared a nature park by the Ministry of Environment and Forest in 2011, and is one of the nine nature parks inside the Belgrad Forest. It covers an area of about 19.14 ha (47.3 acres). The protected area is named after the dam Kirazlıbent, which was built by the Ottoman sultan Mahmud II (reigned 1808–1839) at the Kirazlı Creek in 1818.

The nature park offers outdoor recreation activities such as hiking, cycling and picnicing for visitors on daily basis. There are playgrounds for children. Admission is charged for visitors and vehicles.

== Ecosystem ==
Flora

The plants found in the forest area of the nature park are sessile oak (Quercus petraea), Kasnak oak (Quercus vulcanica), sweet chestnut (Castanea sativa), hornbeam (Carpinus betulus), black pine (Pinus nigra), oriental beech (Fagus orientalis), common ivy (Hedera helix), (Smilax excelsa), butcher's-broom (Ruscus aculeatus) and tree heath (Erica arborea).

Fauna

Animals observed in the nature park are the mammals red deer, red fox, wild boar, golden jackal, porcupine, squirrel, the reptile tortoise and the bird species goldfinch, passer and magpie.

== See also ==
- Ayvat Bendi Nature Park
- Bentler Nature Park
- Falih Rıfkı Atay Nature Park
- Fatih Çeşmesi Nature Park
- Irmak Nature Park
- Kömürcübent Nature Park
- Mehmet Akif Ersoy Nature Park
- Neşet Suyu Nature Park
