= Falih Rıfkı Atay Nature Park =

Nature park in Sarıyer, Istanbul, Turkey

- Falih Rıfkı Atay Tabiat Parkı
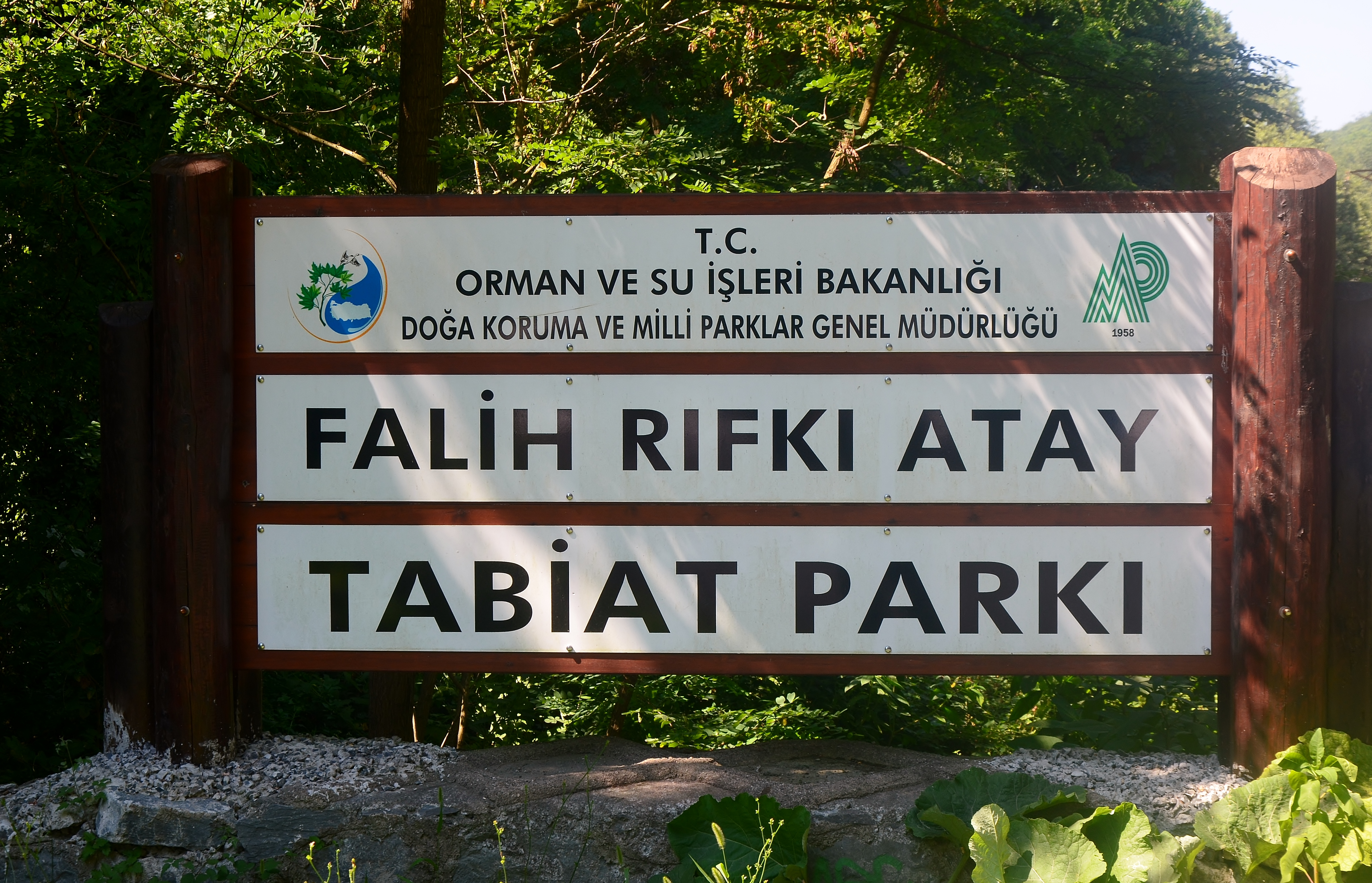

- Location within Istanbul
- Location: Bahçeköy, Sarıyer, Istanbul Province, Turkey
- Coordinates: 41°11′33″N 28°57′39″E
- Area: 16.33 ha (40.4 acres)
- Established: 2011
- Governing body: Directorate-General of Nature Protection and National Parks; Ministry of Environment and Forest

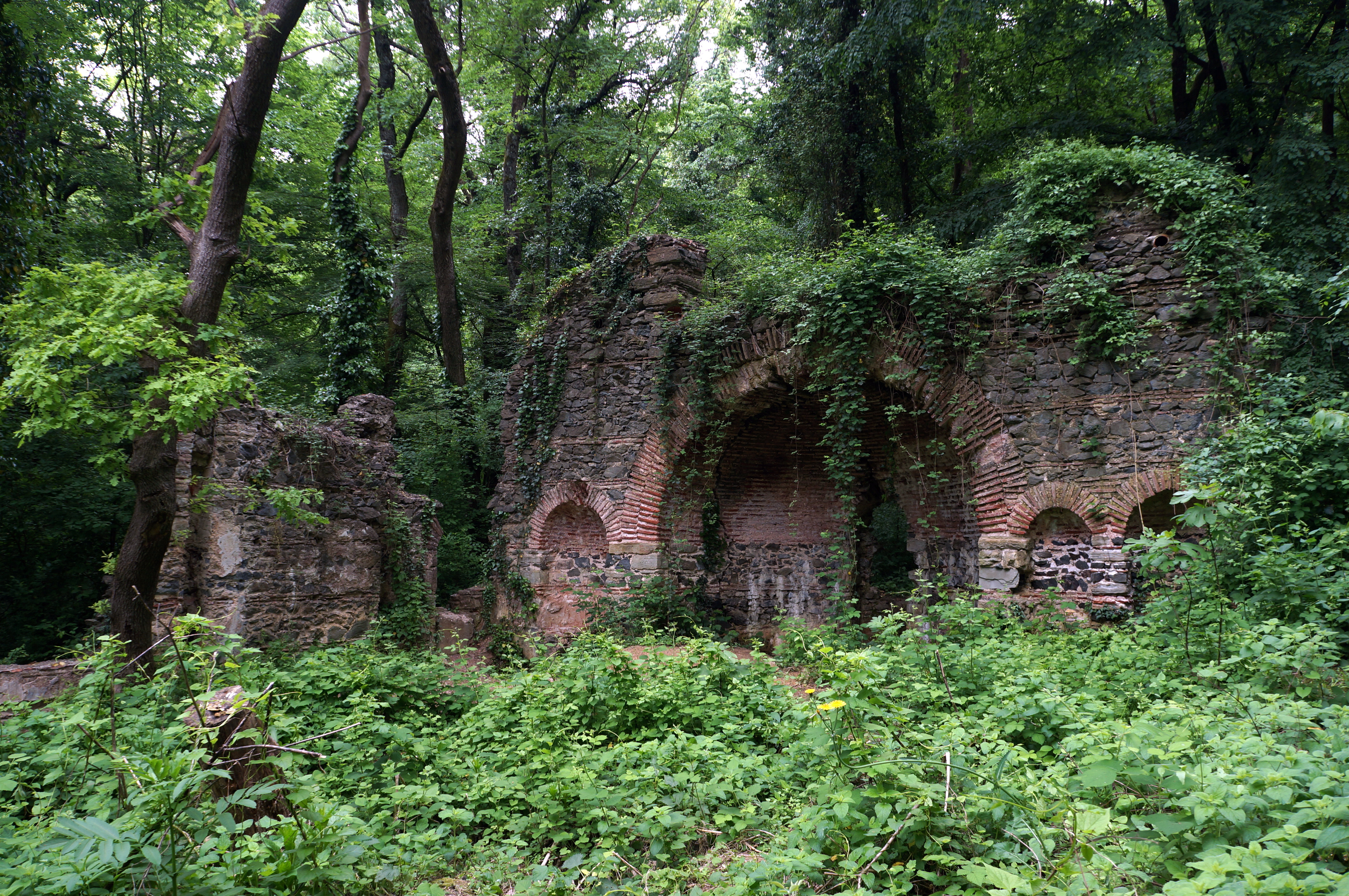
Church ruins in the nature park

Falih Rıfkı Atay Nature Park (Turkish: Falih Rıfkı Atay Tabiat Parkı) is a nature park located in Sarıyer district of Istanbul Province, Turkey.

Situated 7 km (4.3 mi) northwest of Bahçeköy neighborhood of Sarıyer and next to the Neşet Suyu Nature Park, it covers an area of 16.33 ha (40.4 acres). It was established in 2011, and is one of the nine nature parks inside the Belgrad Forest. The protected area is named in honor of journalist, writer and politician Falih Rıfkı Atay (1894–1971).

Serbs who were taken prisoners of war at the Siege of Belgrade (1521) by Ottoman sultan Suleiman the Magnificent (reigned 1520–1566), were brought to Istanbul and settled in a village, which used to lie within the park boundaries. The nature park contains the ruins of a church, which is a protected historic building and was registered as cultural heritage in November 1999.

The nature park offers outdoor recreational activities such as hiking, cycling and picnicing for visitors on daily basis. There are playgrounds for children. Admission is charged for visitors and vehicles and an open-air restaurant serves the visitors.

== Ecosystem ==
The nature park has rich flora and fauna.

Flora

The park is the habitat for diverse species of plant. The main trees present are oak (Quercus robur) and hornbeam (Carpinus betulus). Other deciduous trees include sessile oak (Quercus petraea), kasnak oak (Quercus vulcanica) and shrubs are blackberry (Rubus plicatus), butcher's-broom (Ruscus aculeatus), tree heath (Erica arborea) and bay laurel (Laurus nobilis). Some uncommon trees include silver linden (Tilia argentea) and oriental beech (Fagus orientalis). Anatolian catbrier (Smilax excelsa), aubrietia (Aubrieta cultorum), wild strawberry (Fragaria) and catnip (Nepeta cataria) are some of the flowering plants found in the nature park.

Fauna

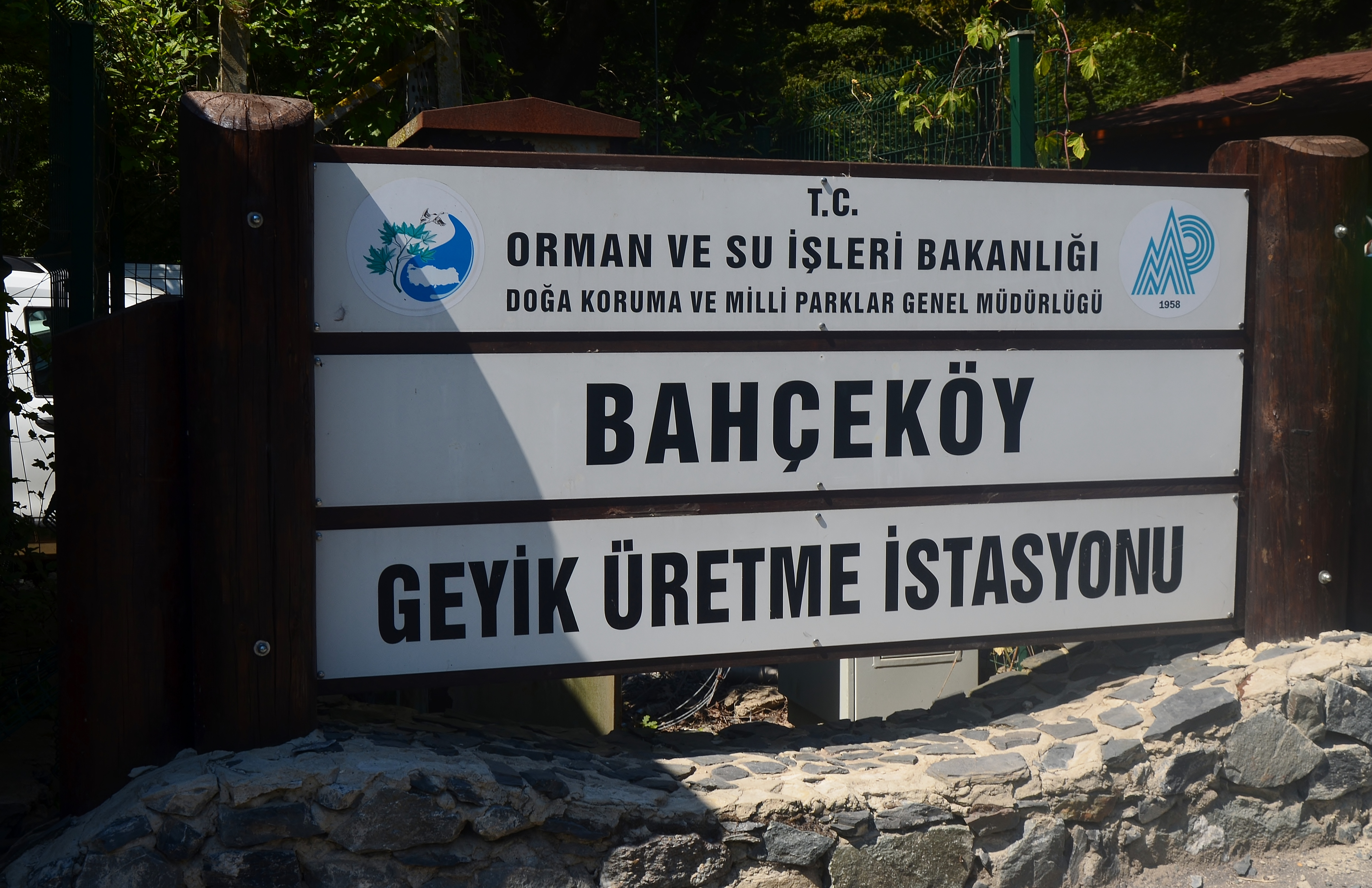
Bahçeköy Deer farm in the Belgrad Forest.

Mainly observed fauna of the nature park are porcupines, squirrels, turtles, magpies, crows, woodpeckers, sparrows and finches. Across the nature park, there is a deer farm (Turkish: Geyik Üretme İstasyonu).

== See also ==
- Ayvat Bendi Nature Park
- Bentler Nature Park
- Fatih Çeşmesi Nature Park
- Irmak Nature Park
- Kirazlıbent Nature Park
- Kömürcübent Nature Park
- Mehmet Akif Ersoy Nature Park
- Neşet Suyu Nature Park
