= Ayvat Bendi Nature Park =

Nature park in Eyüp, Istanbul, Turkey

- Ayvat Bendi Tabiat Parkı
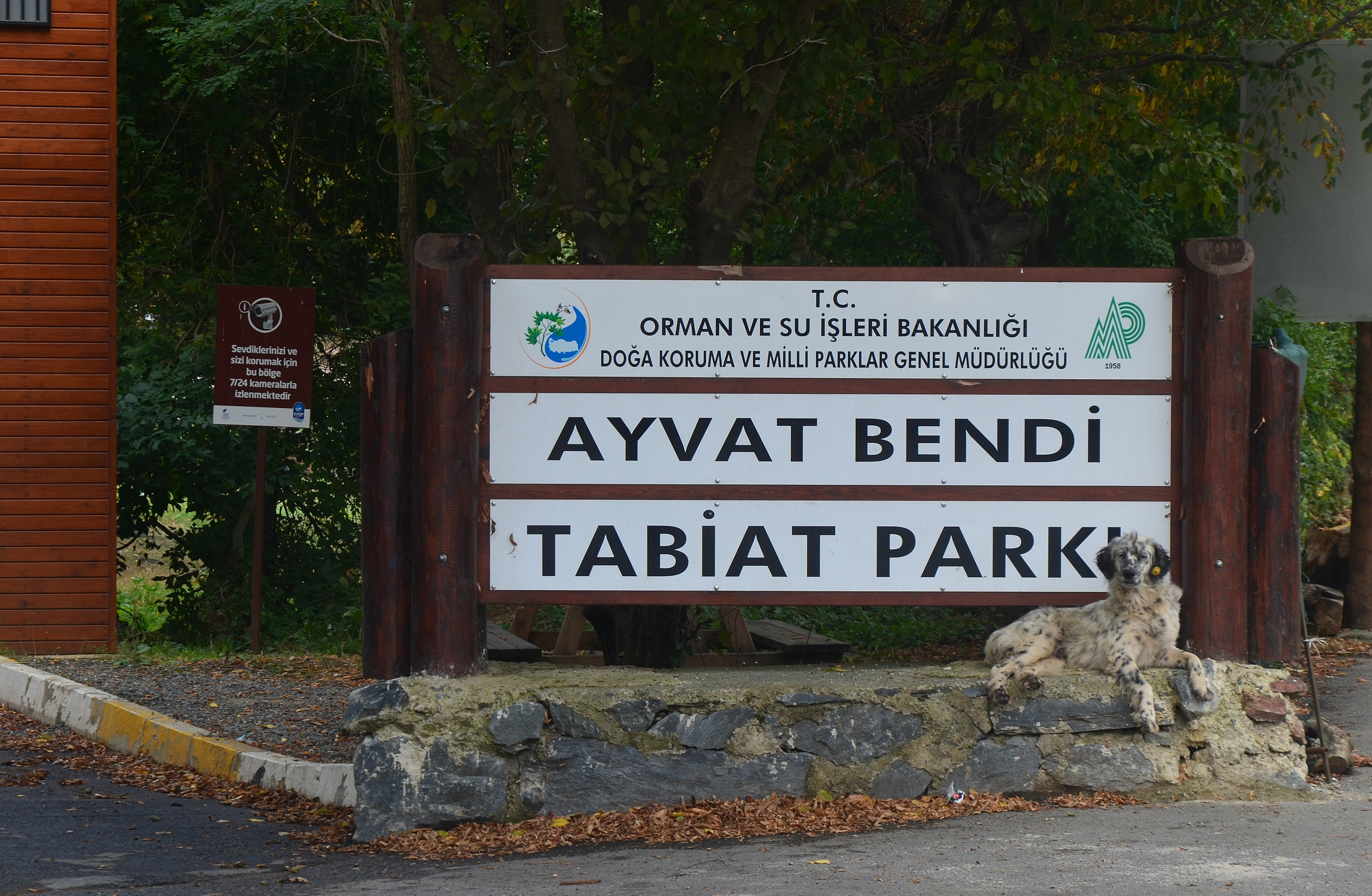

- Location within Istanbul
- Location: Kemerburgaz, Eyüp, Istanbul Province, Turkey
- Coordinates: 41°11′52″N 28°55′15″E
- Area: 50 ha (120 acres)
- Established: 2011
- Governing body: Directorate-General of Nature Protection and National Parks; Ministry of Environment and Forest

Ayvat Bendi Nature Park (Turkish: Ayvat Bendi Tabiat Parkı) is a nature park located in Eyüpsultan district of Istanbul Province, Turkey.

Situated 9 km (5.6 mi) north of Kemerburgaz neighborhood of Eyüpsultan, it covers an area of 50 ha (120 acres). It was established in 2011, and is one of the nine nature parks inside the Belgrad Forest. The protected area is named after the Ayvat Dam (Turkish: Ayvat Bendi), which was built by Ottoman Sultan Mustafa III (reigned 1757–1774) in 1765 on the Ayvat Creek, a tributary of the Kağıthane Creek.

== Ecosystem ==
Flora

Trees in the nature park area are (Quercus vulcanica), sessile oak (Quercus petraea), Turkey oak (Quercus cerris), blackthorn (Prunus spinosa), Oriental beech (Fagus orientalis), sweet chestnut (Castanea sativa), common hornbeam (Carpinus betulus) and common alder (Alnus glutinosa). As shrub and bush species, tree heath (Erica arborea), butcher's-broom (Ruscus aculeatus), blackberry (Rubus), European ivy (Hedera helix), Smilax excelsa, catnip (Nepeta cataria) and aubretia (Aubrieata cultorum) are found.

Fauna

Common mammals of the park are wild boar, golden jackal, deer, roe, fox, wolf, weasel, hare and squirrel. Observed bird species are falcon, hawk, magpie, crow, woodpecker, sparrow, finch and goldfinch.

== Access ==
The nature park can be accessed from the west over Kemerburgaz or from the east over Bahçeköy, Sarıyer. City bus lines #42M or #42HM serve Bahçeköy from Zincirlikuyu and Hacıosman respectively, from where a taxi ride is needed.

== See also ==
- Bentler Nature Park
- Falih Rıfkı Atay Nature Park
- Fatih Çeşmesi Nature Park
- Irmak Nature Park
- Kirazlıbent Nature Park
- Kömürcübent Nature Park
- Mehmet Akif Ersoy Nature Park
- Neşet Suyu Nature Park
