= Fatih Çeşmesi Nature Park =

Nature park in Eyüp, Istanbul, Turkey

- Fatih Çeşmesi Tabiat Parkı
- Location within Istanbul
- Location: Eyüp, Istanbul Province, Turkey
- Coordinates: 41°10′08″N 28°56′42″E
- Area: 29.5 ha (73 acres)
- Established: 2011
- Governing body: Directorate-General of Nature Protection and National Parks; Ministry of Environment and Forest

Fatih Çeşmesi Nature Park (Turkish: Fatih Çeşmesi Tabiat Parkı) is a nature park located in Eyüp district of Istanbul Province, Turkey.

Fatih Çeşmesi Nature Park is situated inside the Belgrad Forest in Eyüp. It is about 6 km (3.7 mi) in distance west of Bahçeköy and east of Kemerburgaz. The area was declared a nature park by the Ministry of Environment and Forest in 2011, and is one of the nine nature parks inside the Belgrad Forest. The protected area is named, literally "Fountain of the Conqueror", in honor of the Ottoman Sultan Mehmed the Conqueror (reigned 1444–1446 and 1451–1481). It covers an area of about 29.5 ha (73 acres).

== Ecosystem ==
The nature park has rich flora and fauna.

Flora

Vegetation found in the nature park are hornbeam (Carpinus betulus), sweet chestnut (Castanea sativa), sessile oak (Quercus petraea), Kasnak oak (Quercus vulcanica), nak Turkey oak (Quercus cerris), common ivy (Hedera helix), butcher's-broom (Ruscus aculeatus), blackberry (Rubus), (Smilax excelsa), cherry laurel (Laurocerasus officinalis), Chinese photinia (Photinia serratifolia), Syrian juniper (Juniperus drupacea) and catnip (Nepeta Cataria).

Fauna

Nearly 100 bird species and numerous mammals are observed in the Belgrad Forest. Some of the bird species are hawk, woodpecker, European goldfinch, magpie and passer. Among the mammals are deer, roe deer, wild boar and fox, and the reptile tortoise.

== See also ==
- Ayvat Bendi Nature Park
- Bentler Nature Park
- Falih Rıfkı Atay Nature Park
- Irmak Nature Park
- Kirazlıbent Nature Park
- Kömürcübent Nature Park
- Mehmet Akif Ersoy Nature Park
- Neşet Suyu Nature Park
