= Kömürcübent Nature Park =

Nature park in Sarıyer, Istanbul, Turkey

- Kömürcübent Tabiat Parkı
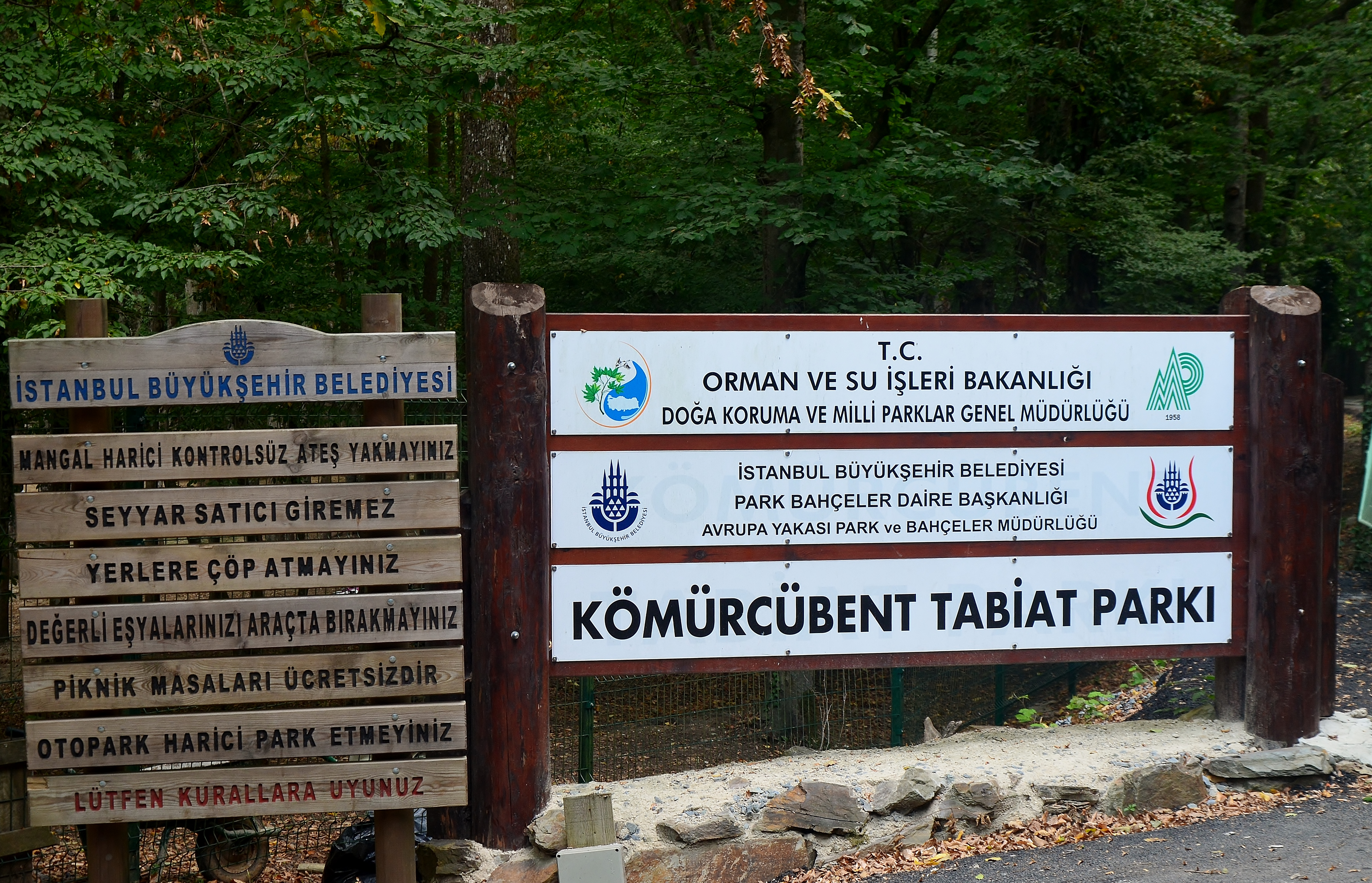

- Location within Istanbul
- Location: Bahçeköy, Sarıyer, Istanbul Province, Turkey
- Coordinates: 41°12′19″N 28°57′39″E
- Area: 3 ha (7.4 acres)
- Established: 2011
- Governing body: Directorate-General of Nature Protection and National Parks; Ministry of Environment and Forest

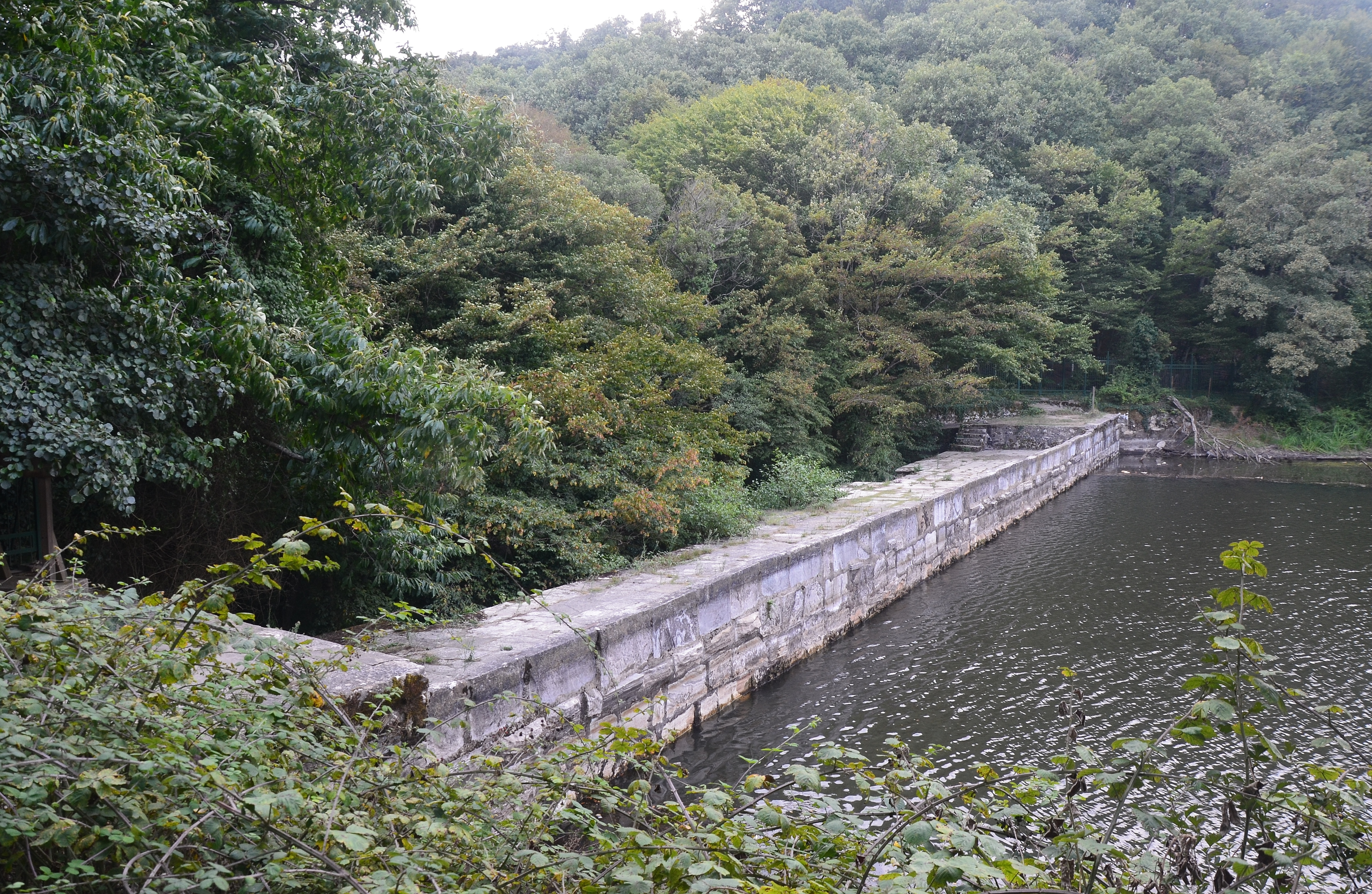
Dam of the Kömürcübent Nature Park.

Kömürcübent Nature Park (Turkish: Kömürcübent Tabiat Parkı) is a nature park located in Sarıyer district of Istanbul Province, Turkey.

Kömürcübent is situated inside the Belgrad Forest at Bahçeköy neighborhood of Sarıyer.It is reached after entering the Belgrad Forest through its Bahçeköy Gate, and passing by Neşet Suyu Nature Park and Falih Rıfkı Atay Nature Park. It covers an area of about 3 ha (7.4 acres). The area was declared a nature park by the Ministry of Environment and Forest in 2011, and is one of the nine nature parks inside the Belgrad Forest. The protected area is named for the historic dam Kömürcübent, which was built on Topuz Creek in 1620 by the Ottoman sultan Osman II (reigned 1618–1622). The dam is the oldest one in the Belgrad Forest. Next to the nature park, there is a deer farm.

The nature park offers outdoor recreation activities such as hiking, cycling and picnicing for visitors on daily basis. There is an outdoor restaurant, an outdoor coffeehouse and playgrounds for children. Admission is charged for visitors and vehicles.

== Ecosystem ==
The nature park is rich on flora and fauna.

Flora

Dominant tree species are oak (Quercus petraea) and hornbeam (Carpinus betulus) while on the creek banks common ash and alder are found. Other plants of the nature park are blackthorn (Prunus spinosa),butcher's-broom (Ruscus aculeatus), Anatolian Sarsaparilla (Smilax excelsa) and European ivy (Hedera helix).

Fauna

Animals observed in the nature park are the mammals jackal, porcupine, squirrel, the reptile tortoise, the bird species European goldfinch and finch.

== See also ==
- Ayvat Bendi Nature Park
- Bentler Nature Park
- Falih Rıfkı Atay Nature Park
- Fatih Çeşmesi Nature Park
- Irmak Nature Park
- Kirazlıbent Nature Park
- Mehmet Akif Ersoy Nature Park
- Neşet Suyu Nature Park
