= Mehmet Akif Ersoy Nature Park =

Nature park in Sarıyer, Istanbul, Turkey

- Mehmet AKif Ersoy Tabiat Paekı
- Location within Istanbul
- Location: Bahçeköy, Sarıyer, Istanbul Province, Turkey
- Coordinates: 41°10′04″N 29°00′02″E
- Area: 23 ha (57 acres)
- Established: 2011
- Governing body: Directorate-General of Nature Protection and National Parks; Ministry of Environment and Forest

Mehmet Akif Ersoy Nature Park (Turkish: Mehmet Akif Ersoy Tabiat Parkı) is a nature park located in Istanbul Province, Turkey.

== Geography ==
The park is situated in Bahçeköy neighborhood of Sarıyer district. It covers an area of 23 ha (57 acres). The area was declared a nature park by the Ministry of Environment and Forest in 2011, and is one of nine nature parks inside Belgrad Forest. The protected area is named in honor of Mehmet Akif Ersoy (1873–1936), poet, writer, academic, member of parliament, and author of the Turkish National Anthem.

The nature park offers outdoor recreational activities, such as picnics, hiking and cycling.

== Amenities ==
The park offers an outdoor restaurant, an outdoor coffeehouse and playgrounds for children.

== Ecosystem ==
The nature park has rich flora and fauna.

=== Flora ===
The flora is middle-aged and old forest trees. In the forest section, vegetation includes oriental plane (Platanus orientalis), black pine (Pinus nigra), silver linden (Tilia argentea), hornbeam (Carpinus betulus), Hungarian oak (Quercus frainetto), sessile oak (Quercus petraea), common ash (Fraxinus excelsior), oriental beech (Fagus orientalis), alder (Alnus glutinosa), blackberry (Rubus) and tree heath (Erica arborea). Plants seen around the coffeehouse and the activity area are oriental thuja (Platycladus orientalis), blackthorn (Prunus spinosa), evergreen spindle (Euonymus japonicus), Chinese photinia (Photinia serratifolia), bay laurel (Laurus nobilis), Australian laurel (Pittosporum tobira), goat willow (Salix caprea), butcher's-broom (Ruscus aculeatus), wild privet, (Ligustrum vulgare), common lavender (Lavandula angustifolia), purple dead-nettle (Lamium purpureum) and dandelion (Taraxacum officinale).

=== Fauna ===
Common animals are the mammal squirrel and the reptile lizard. BIrds include woodpecker, European goldfinch, magpie and parrot.

== See also ==
- Ayvat Bendi Nature Park
- Bentler Nature Park
- Falih Rıfkı Atay Nature Park
- Fatih Çeşmesi Nature Park
- Irmak Nature Park
- Kirazlıbent Nature Park
- Kömürcübent Nature Park
- Neşet Suyu Nature Park
