= Bentler Nature Park =

Nature park in Sarıyer, Istanbul, Turkey

- Bentler Tabiat Parkı
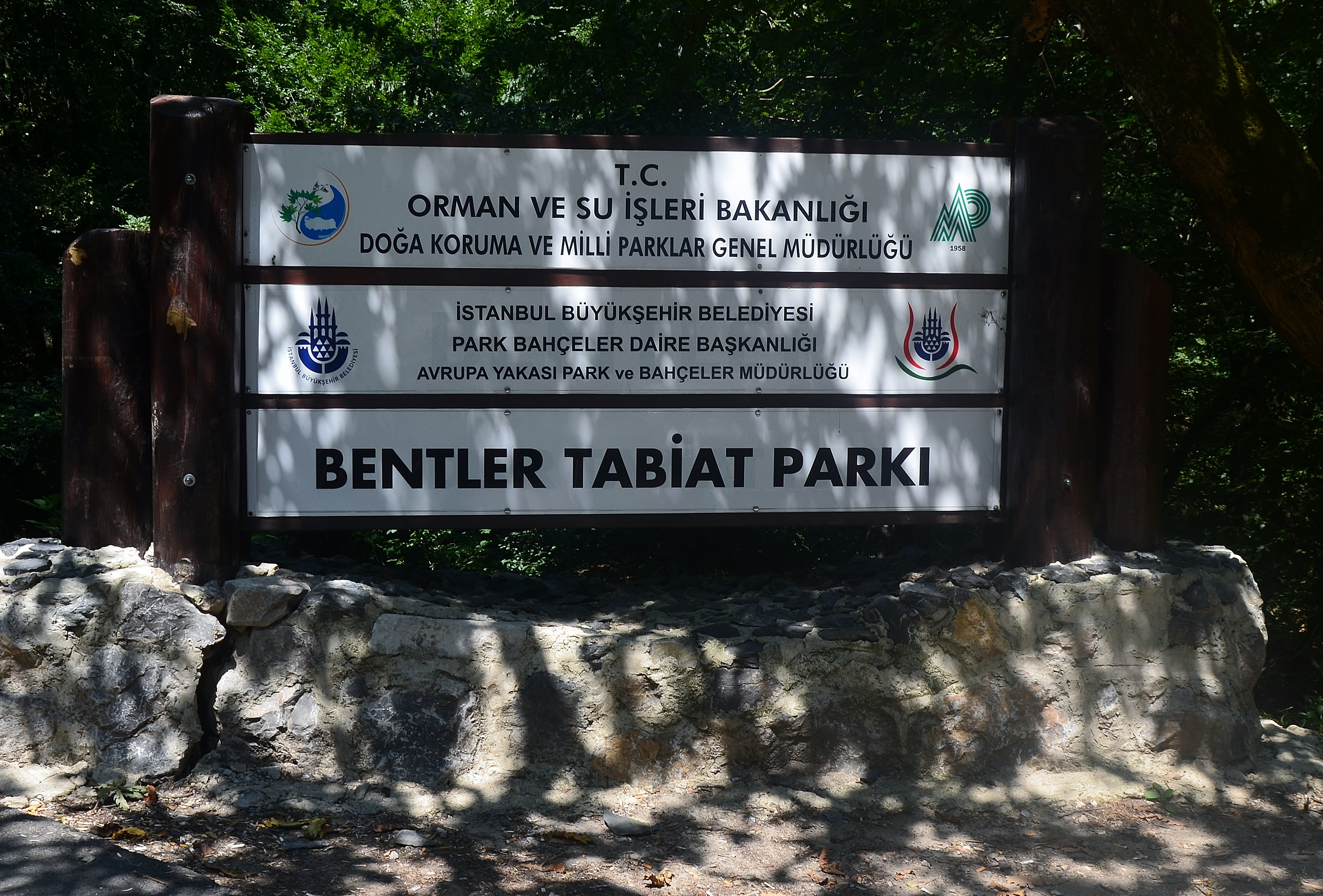

- Location within Istanbul
- Location: Bahçeköy, Sarıyer, Istanbul Province, Turkey
- Coordinates: 41°11′22″N 28°59′13″E
- Area: 16.3 ha (40 acres)
- Established: 2011
- Governing body: Directorate-General of Nature Protection and National Parks; Ministry of Environment and Forest

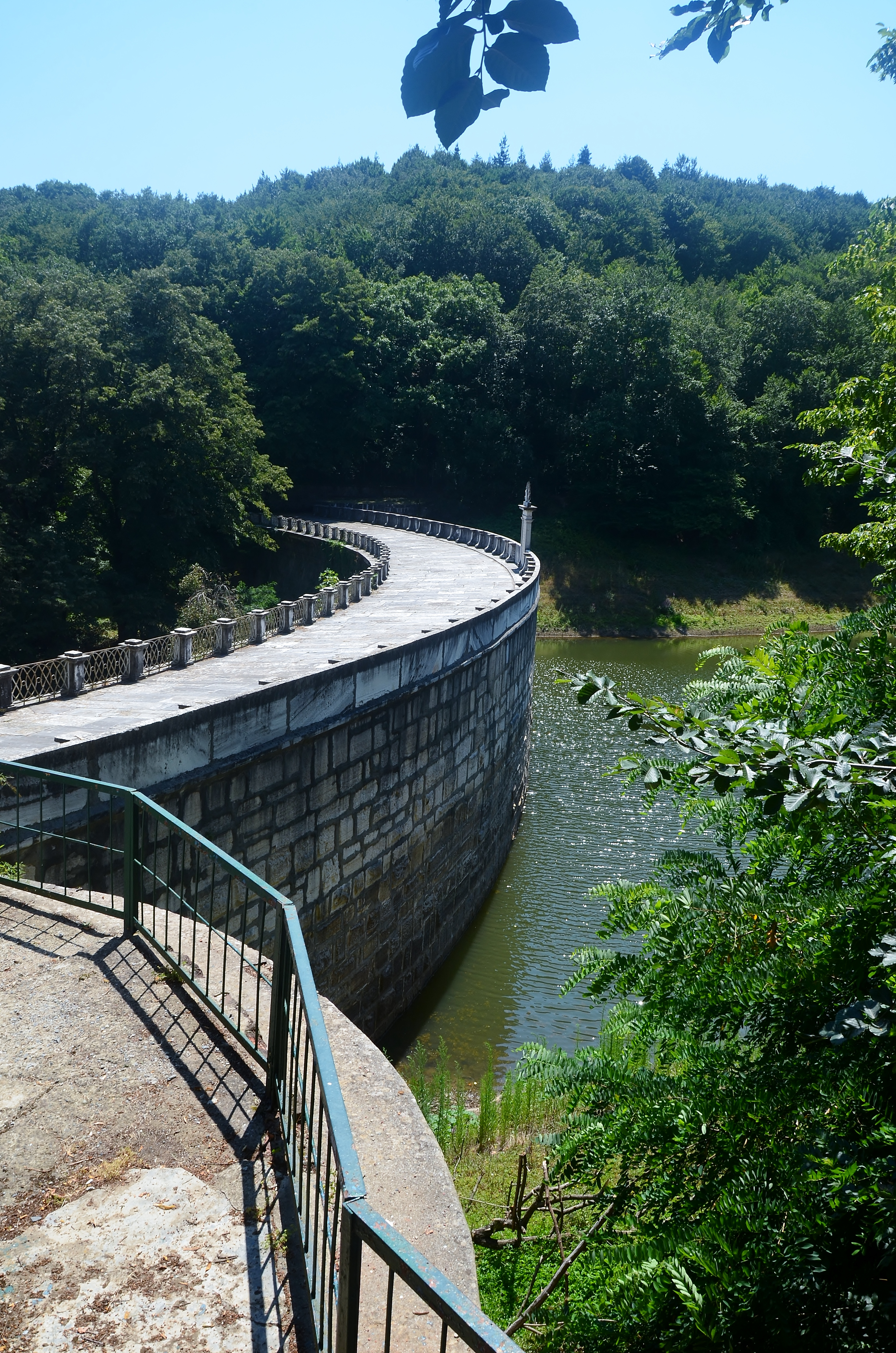
New Dam at the Bentler Nature Park.

Bentler Nature Park (Turkish: Bentler Tabiat Parkı) is a nature park located in Sarıyer district of Istanbul Province, Turkey. Bentler means "dams" in Turkish language.

Situated 1 km (0.62 mi) from Bahçeköy neighborhood of Sarıyer, it covers an area of 16.3 ha (40 acres). It was established in 2011, and is one of the nine nature parks inside the Belgrad Forest. The protected area is named after the historic dams, the Topuzlu Dam (Topuzlu Bendi, built 1750), Valide Dam (Valide Bendi, built 1796) and New Dam (Yeni Bent or II. Mahmud Bendi, built 1839), which are located north of the park area. There are other structures as the Iskara Bendi and historical fountains from the Ottoman Empire era. Bentler Nature Park has two entrances, the main entrance of Belgrad Forest and Kurtkemeri Gate.

The nature park offers outdoor recreation activities such as hiking, cycling and picnicing for visitors on daily basis. There are playgrounds for children. Admission is charged for visitors and vehicles.

== Ecosystem ==
The nature park is rich on flora and fauna.

Flora

Main tree species are oak (Quercus petraea) and hornbeam (Carpinus betulus). A 269-year old plane tree (Platanus) next to the Valide Dam was registered as a monument.

The park is habitat for diverse plant species. As coniferous tree Turkish pine (Pinus brutia), as deciduous trees oriental plane (Platanus orientalis), silver linden (Tilia argentea), European hornbeam (Carpinus betulus), oriental beech (Fagus orientalis), kasnak oak (Quercus vulcanica), Turkey oak (Quercus cerris), Aleppo oak (Quercus infectoria), European ash (Fraxinus excelsior), sweet chestnut (Castanea sativa), alder (Alnus orientalis), blackthorn (Prunus spinosa), medlar (Mespilus germanica), Turkish hazel (Corylus colurna) are found in the park. Shrubs of the nature park are blackberry (Rubus plicatus), butcher's-broom (Ruscus aculeatus) and buttercup (Clematis).

Fauna

The main fauna of the nature park consists of the mammals wild boar (Sus scrofa), fox (Vulpes vulpes), deer (Cervidae), roe deer (Capreolus capreolus), hare (Lepus), chipmunk, the reptile turtle. Observed bird species are hawk, sparrow, finch, mappie.

== See also ==
- Ayvat Bendi Nature Park
- Falih Rıfkı Atay Nature Park
- Fatih Çeşmesi Nature Park
- Irmak Nature Park
- Kirazlıbent Nature Park
- Kömürcübent Nature Park
- Mehmet Akif Ersoy Nature Park
- Neşet Suyu Nature Park
