= Neşet Suyu Nature Park =

Nature park in Sarıyer, Istanbul, Turkey

- Neşet Suyu Tabiat Parkı
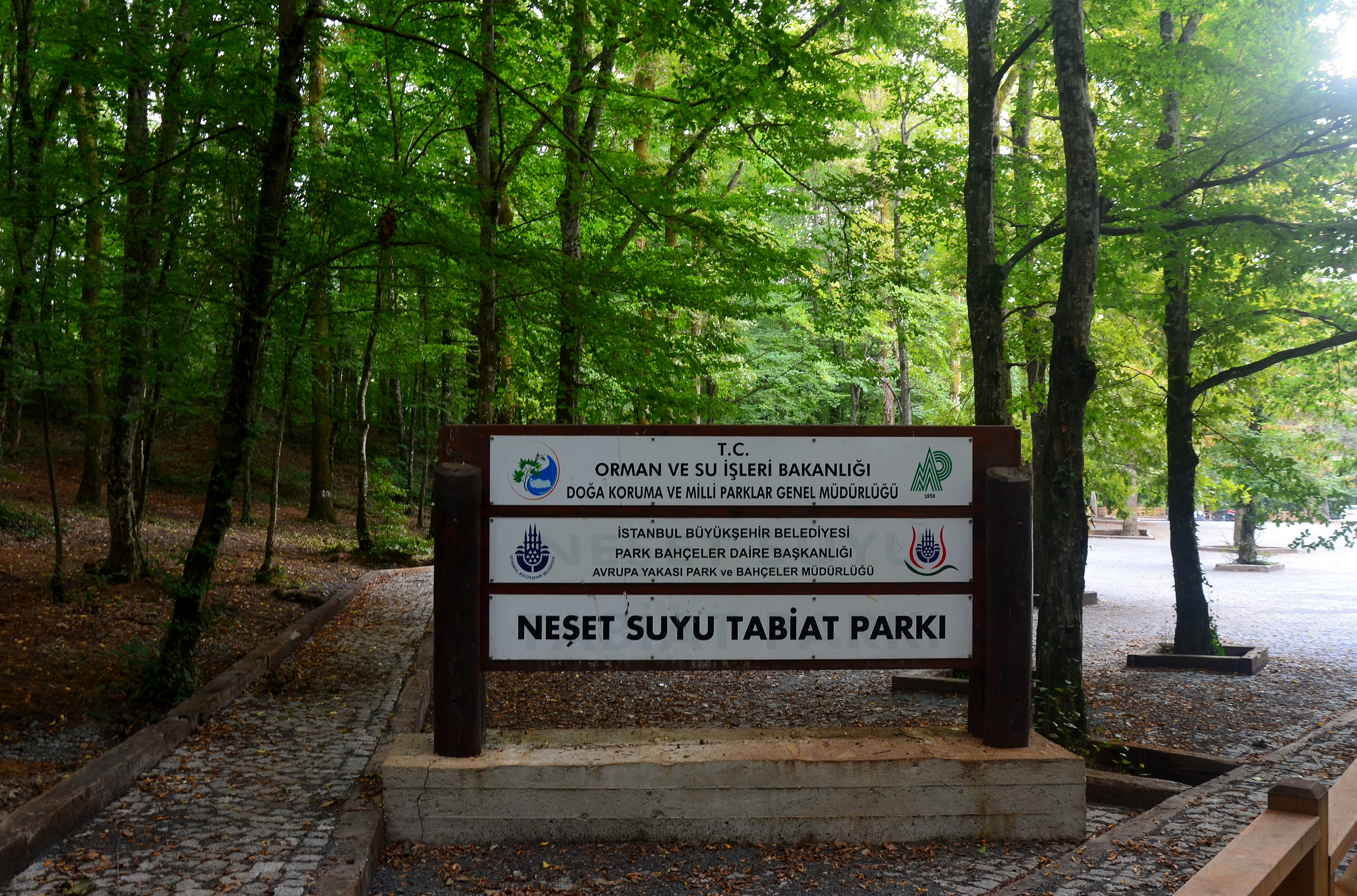

- Location within Istanbul
- Location: Bahçeköy, Sarıyer, Istanbul Province, Turkey
- Coordinates: 41°11′18″N 28°58′10″E
- Area: 67.47 ha (166.7 acres)
- Established: 2011
- Governing body: Directorate-General of Nature Protection and National Parks; Ministry of Environment and Forest

Neşet Suyu Nature Park, aka Neşetsuyu Nature Park, (Turkish: Neşet Suyu Tabiat Parkı or Neşetsuyu Tabiat Parkı) is a nature park located in Sarıyer district of Istanbul Province, Turkey.

Situated 6 km (3.7 mi) northwest of Bahçeköy neighborhood of Sarıyer and next to the Falih Rıfkı Atay Nature Park, it covers an area of 67.47 ha (166.7 acres). It was established in 2011, and is one of the nine nature parks inside the Belgrad Forest. The protected area is named in honor of Professor (Ottoman Turkish: Müderris) Neşet Bey (1881–1924).

Neşet Bey was born in Resen, Ottoman Empire, today in North Macedonia, in 1881. He taught at the (Ottoman Turkish: Orman Mekteb-i âlîsi), today Forestry Faculty of Istanbul University, and served as its rector. He was much respected for his works in forestry by his colleagues and students. A memorial marble inscription erected by the Turkish Directorate General of Forestry on September 21, 1953 is situated inside the nature park.

In the southwest of the nature park, the Büyük Bent (literally: Big Dam) is situated on the Kırkçeşme water canal. Remains of a cistern and the mihrab of an open-air prayer place (Turkish: namazgah) are registered protected cultural heritage in the park area.

In 2000, the soil in the park area, which is one of the most popular recreation places in Istanbul, was loosened up by earth movers since the soil became hardened throughout the years like concrete endangering the trees. It was found that the growth of the tree roots stopped, bacteria and fungi population increased due to lack of oxygen in the soil. Fallen leaves could not merge with the hardened soil to make it nutrient for the vegetation. The park area was closed to picnics until 2005.

== Ecosystem ==
The nature park has rich flora and fauna.

Flora

Dominant tree species of the nature park are oak and European hornbeam (Carpinus betulus). Other vegetation in the area are various shrubs and bushes.

Fauna

There are mammals and bird species in significant numbers in the Belgrad Forest. The main fauna species of the forestry are wild boar, golden jackal, deer, roe, fox, wolf, weasel, hare, squirrel, tortoise and hedgehog. As bird species observed are falcon, hawk, magpie, crow, woodpecker, sparrow, finch and goldfinch.

== Gallery ==
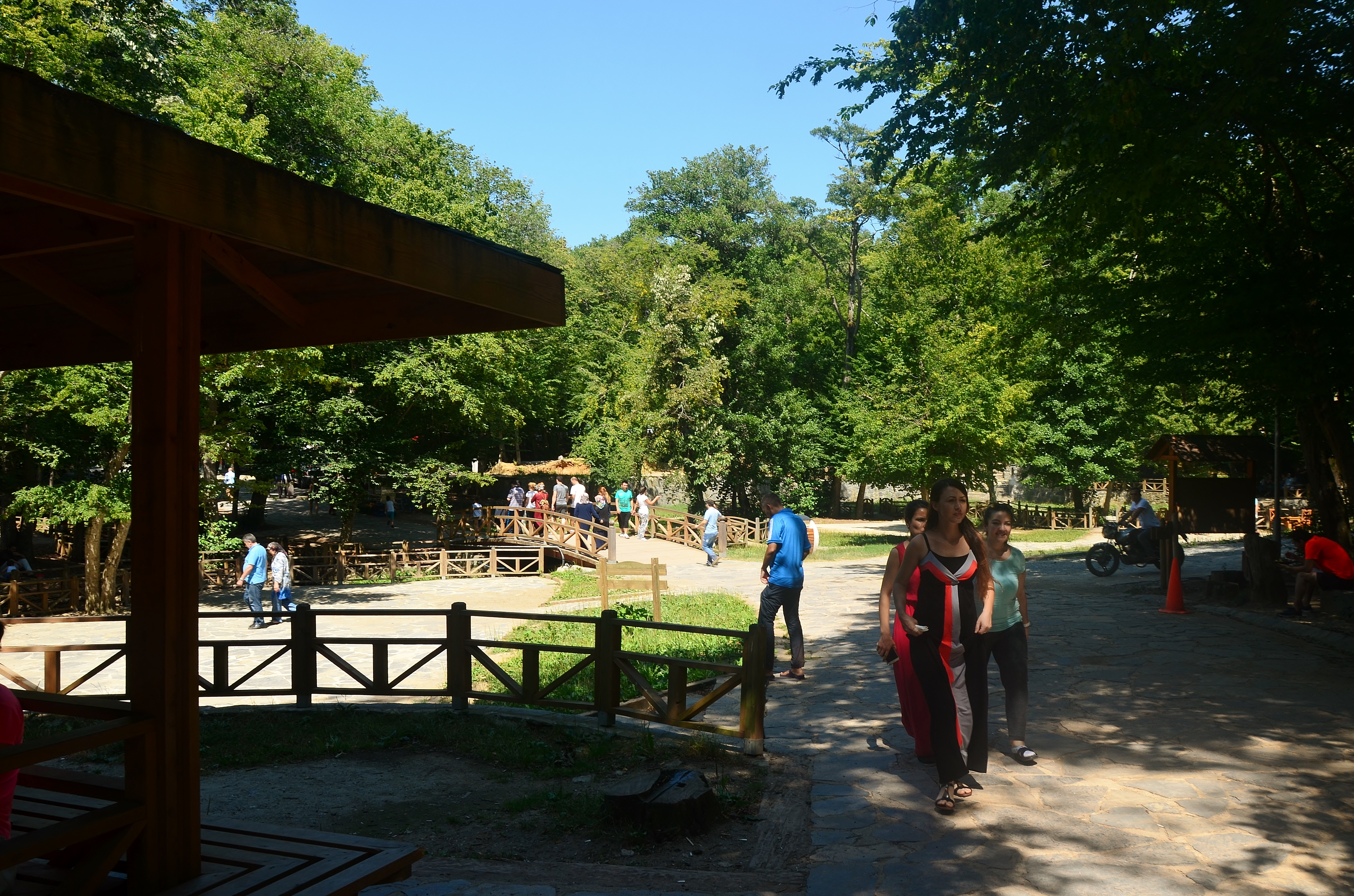
A view from the nature park.

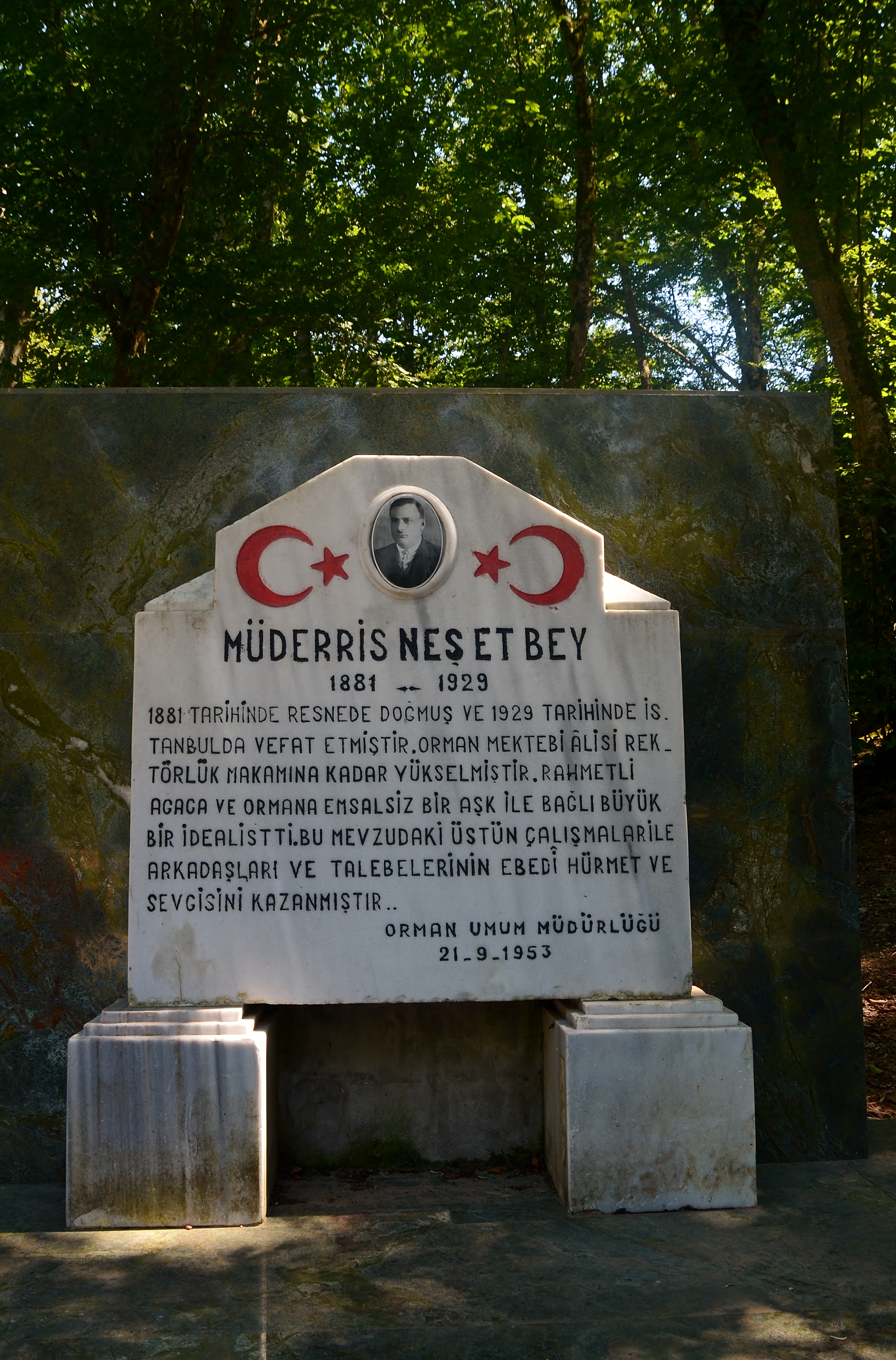
Memorial inscription for Professor Neşet Bey inside the nature park.

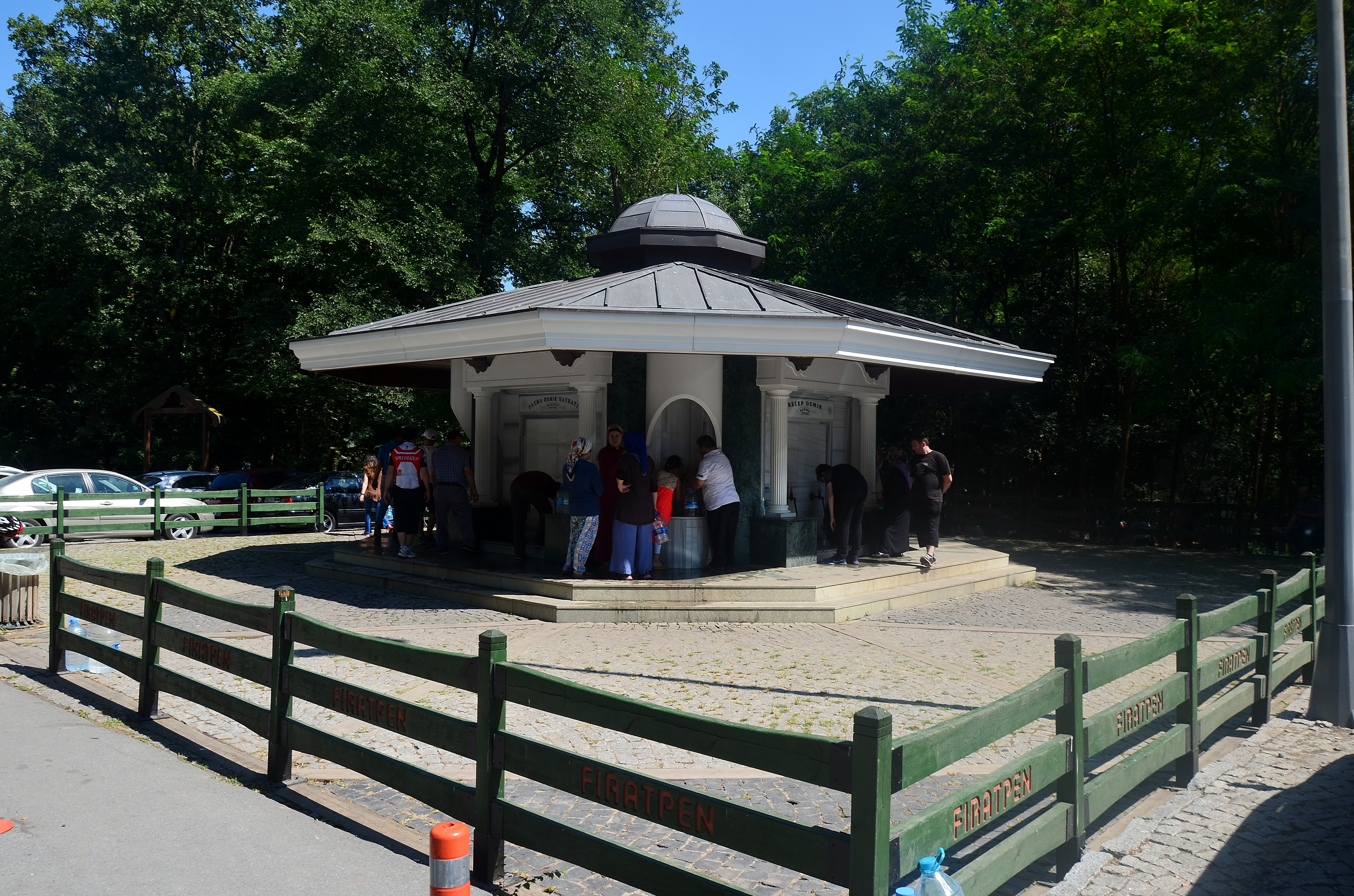
A fountain in the park.

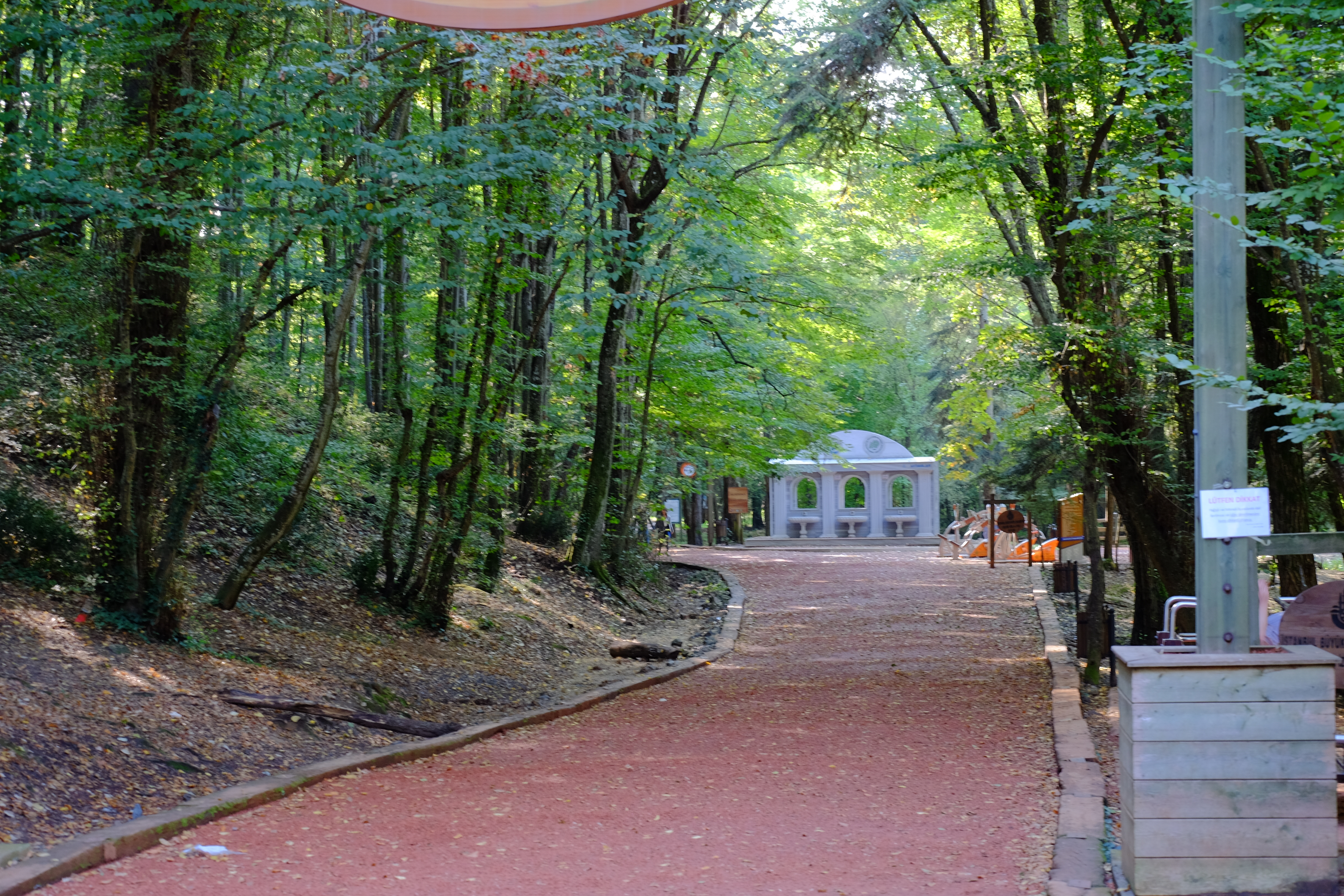

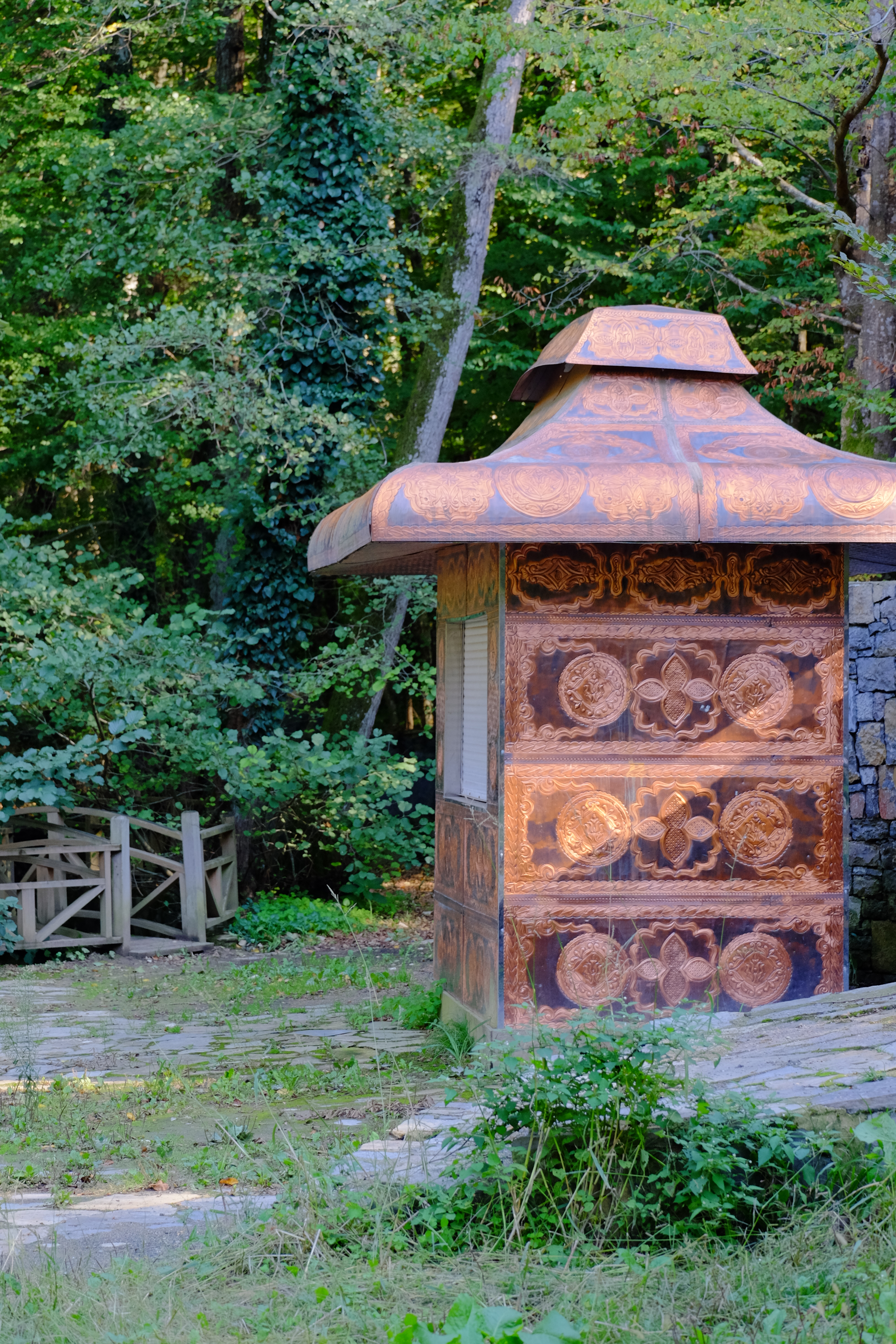

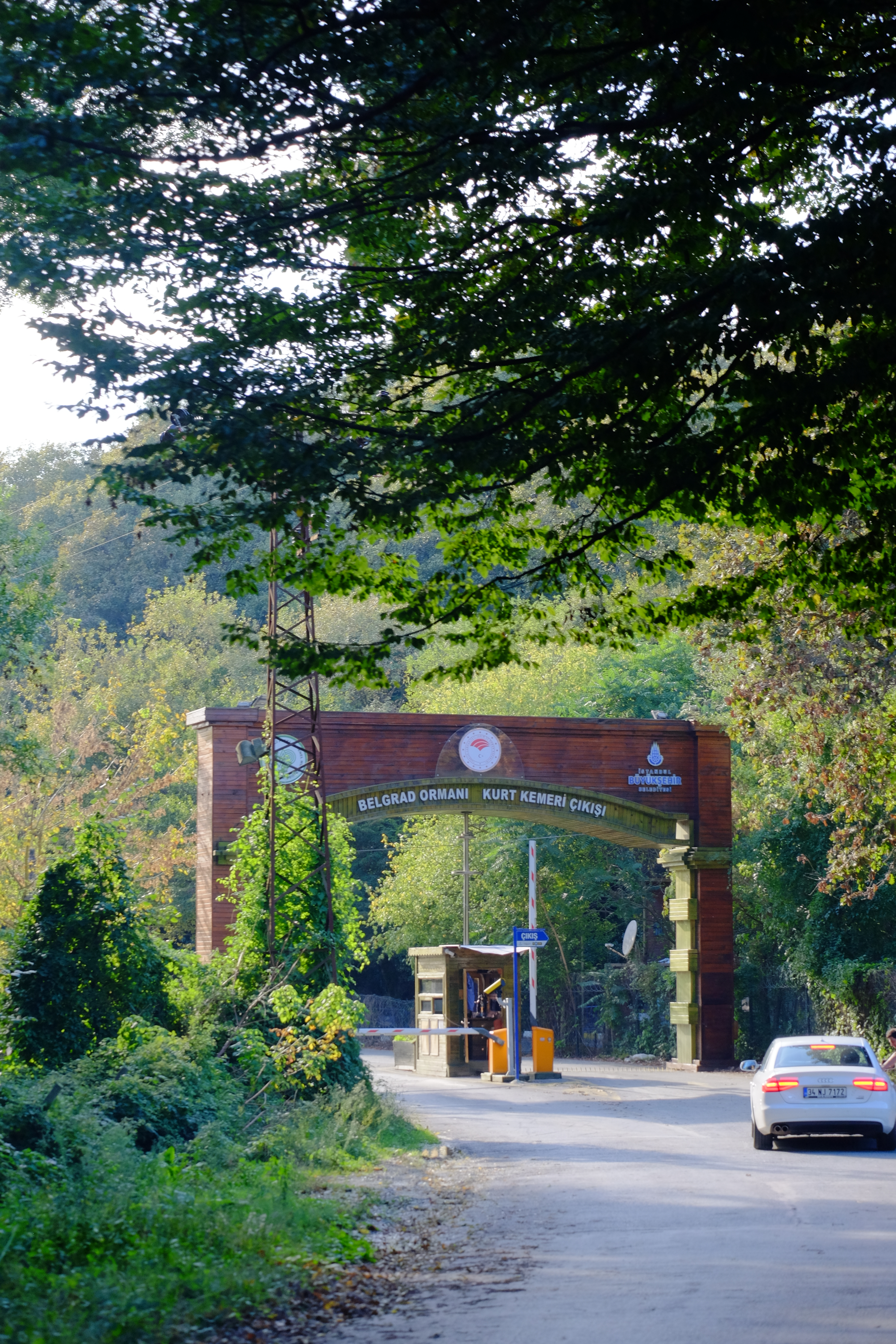

== See also ==
- Ayvat Bendi Nature Park
- Bentler Nature Park
- Falih Rıfkı Atay Nature Park
- Fatih Çeşmesi Nature Park
- Irmak Nature Park
- Kirazlıbent Nature Park
- Kömürcübent Nature Park
- Mehmet Akif Ersoy Nature Park
