= New Dam =

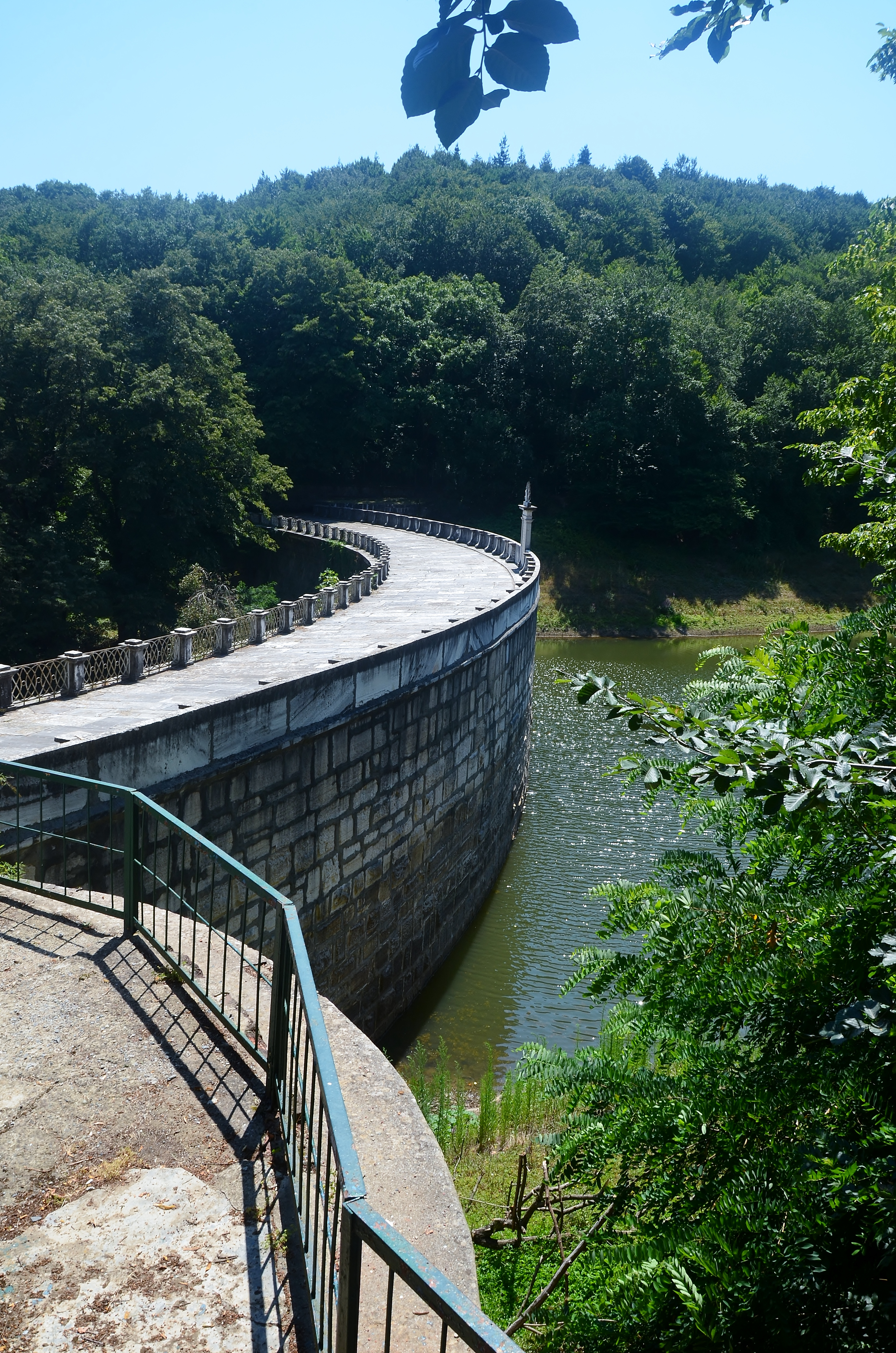
- New Dam (Mahmut II Dam) inside the Bentler Nature Park

- Location within Istanbul
- Official name: Yeni Bent
- Country: Turkey
- Location: Bahçeköy, Sarıyer, Istanbul Province
- Coordinates: 41°11′23″N 28°59′10″E
- Opening date: 1830

Dam and spillways
- Type of dam: Solid gravity dam
- Impounds: A tributary of Acıelma Creek
- Height (thalweg): 15.62 m (51.2 ft)
- Length: 101.55 m (333.2 ft)
- Width (crest): 6.90 m (22.6 ft)
- Width (base): 9.40 m (30.8 ft)

Reservoir
- Total capacity: 217,500 m^{3} (7,680,000 cu ft)
- Catchment area: 0.83 km^{2} (0.32 sq mi)

The New Dam (Turkish: Yeni Bent), a.k.a. Mahmud II Dam (Turkish: II. Mahmut Bendi), is a historic dam located in Sarıyer district of Istanbul Province, Turkey.

The New Dam was built in 1830 by Ottoman Sultan Mahmud II (reigned 1808–1839).

The dam is situated next to Valide Dam north of Bahçeköy, Sarıyer inside the Bentler Nature Park, which is part of the Belgrad Forest.

The New Dam impounds a tributary of Acıelma Creek and has a catchment area of 0.83 km^{2} (0.32 sq mi). It is a solid gravity dam constructed in masonry having a circular form. The dam is 15.62 m (51.2 ft) high from the thalweg and 101.55 m (333.2 ft) long at crest. The crest is 6.90 m (22.6 ft) and the base is 9.40 m (30.8 ft) wide. The dam has a reservoir capacity of 217,500 m^{3} (7,680,000 cu ft).
