= Belgrad Forest =

Forest in Istanbul, Turkey

Belgrad Forest Turkish: Belgrad Ormanı
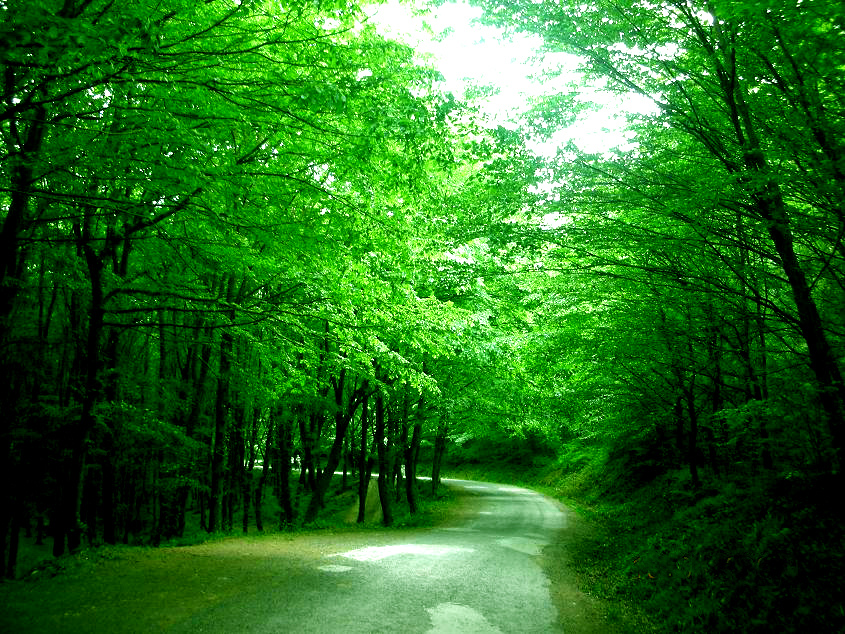
- View of Belgrad Forest

- Location within Turkey
- Interactive map of Belgrad Forest

Geography
- Location: Istanbul, Turkey
- Coordinates: 41°11′40″N 28°57′05″E
- Elevation: 135
- Area: 5,524 ha (13,650 acres)

Belgrad Forest (Turkish: Belgrad Ormanı) is a mixed deciduous forest lying adjacent to Istanbul, Turkey. It is named after the village next to the forest, settled by thousands of Serbs who were deported to the capital Constantinople from the city of Belgrade in 1521, when it fell to the Ottomans. Geographically, the forest is located at the easternmost point of the Thracian Peninsula. Forest terrain is divided between Sarıyer and Eyüp districts. Several historical reservoirs lie within the forest.

== History ==
This forest was one of the important water resources of Constantinople in the period of the Eastern Roman Empire, and after the fall of Constantinople Turks have respected and protected it. The Thracian village of Belgrad (from which the forest takes its name) was named after the thousands of Serbs that Suleiman the Magnificent had deported to Thrace after the 1521 Siege of Belgrade.

== Size and composition of the forest ==
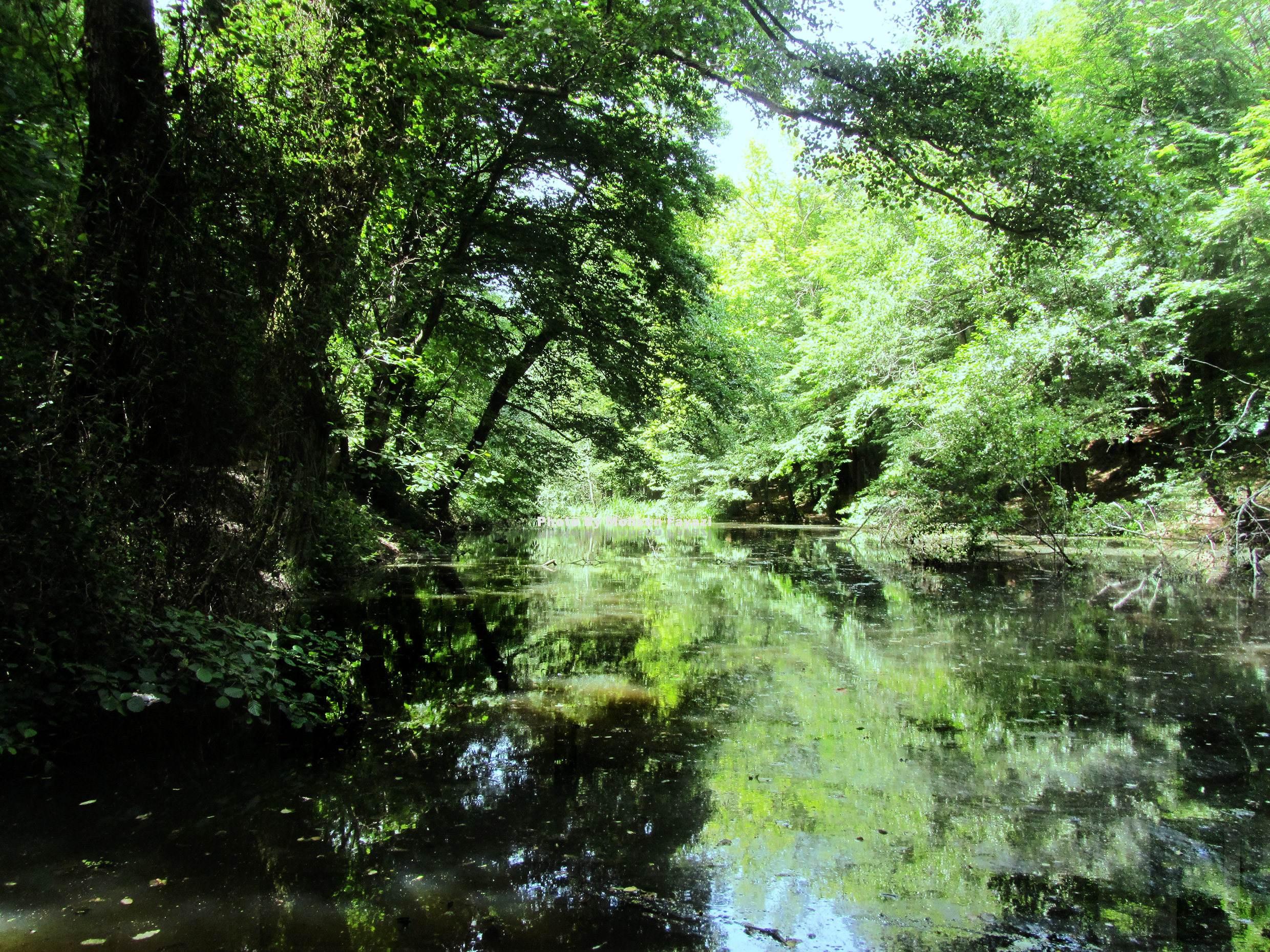
The marsh in the middle of the Belgrad Forest, Istanbul, Turkey.

With a region around 5,524 hectares of forest it houses many plant, bird and animal species. The most common tree in the forest is sessile oak (Quercus petraea). Belgrad Forest is under protection and is one of the most visited recreational areas of Istanbul. The building of the western section of the motorway running over the 3rd Bosphorus bridge (opened 2016) which runs through the northern part of the forest, the expansion of Istanbul (Maslak etc. ), the settlements which surround the forest, and new roads question the practical effect of the protection.

== Aqueducts ==
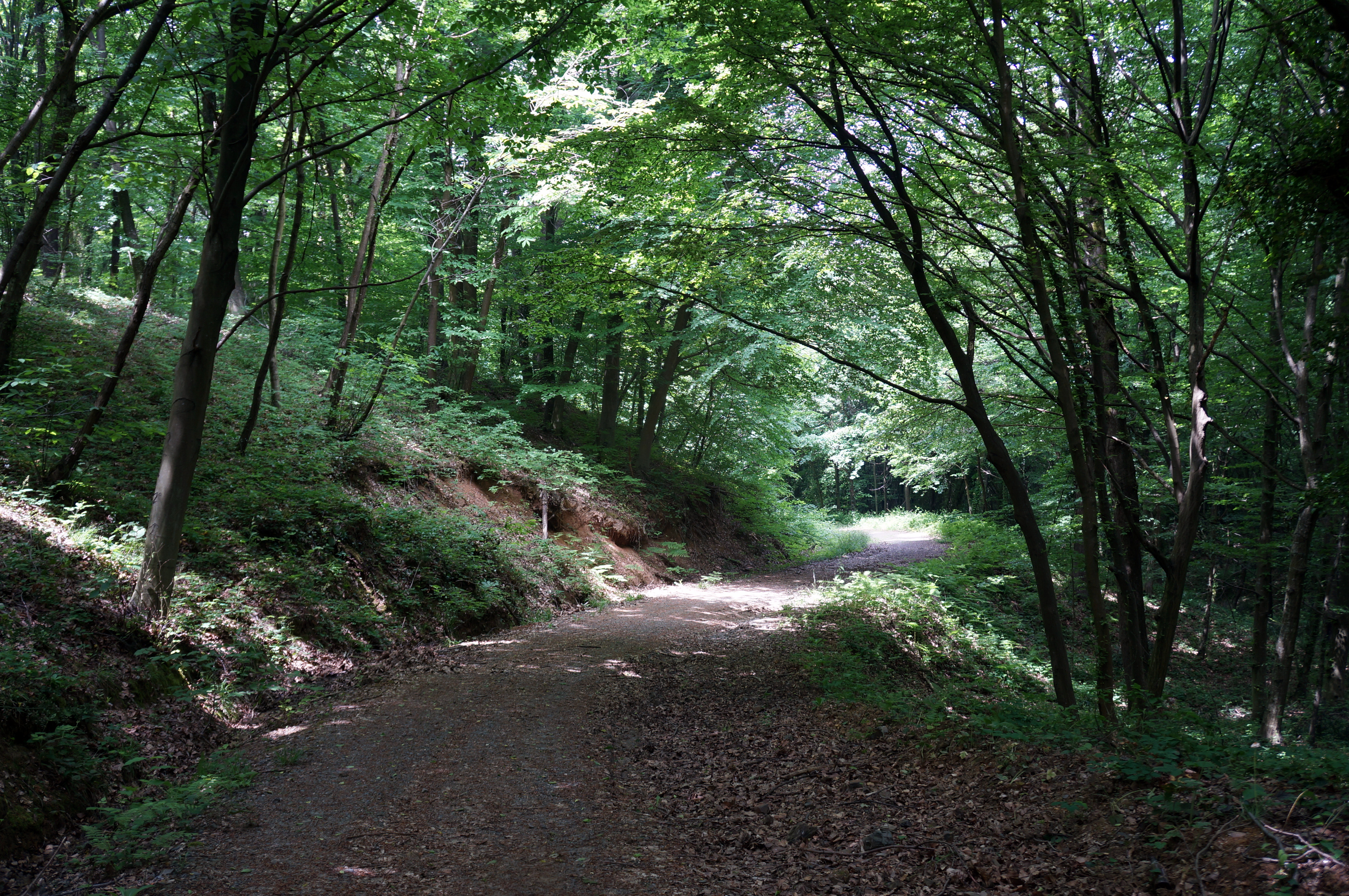
One of the many pathways in the forest, a favorite among Istanbulites for jogging and running.

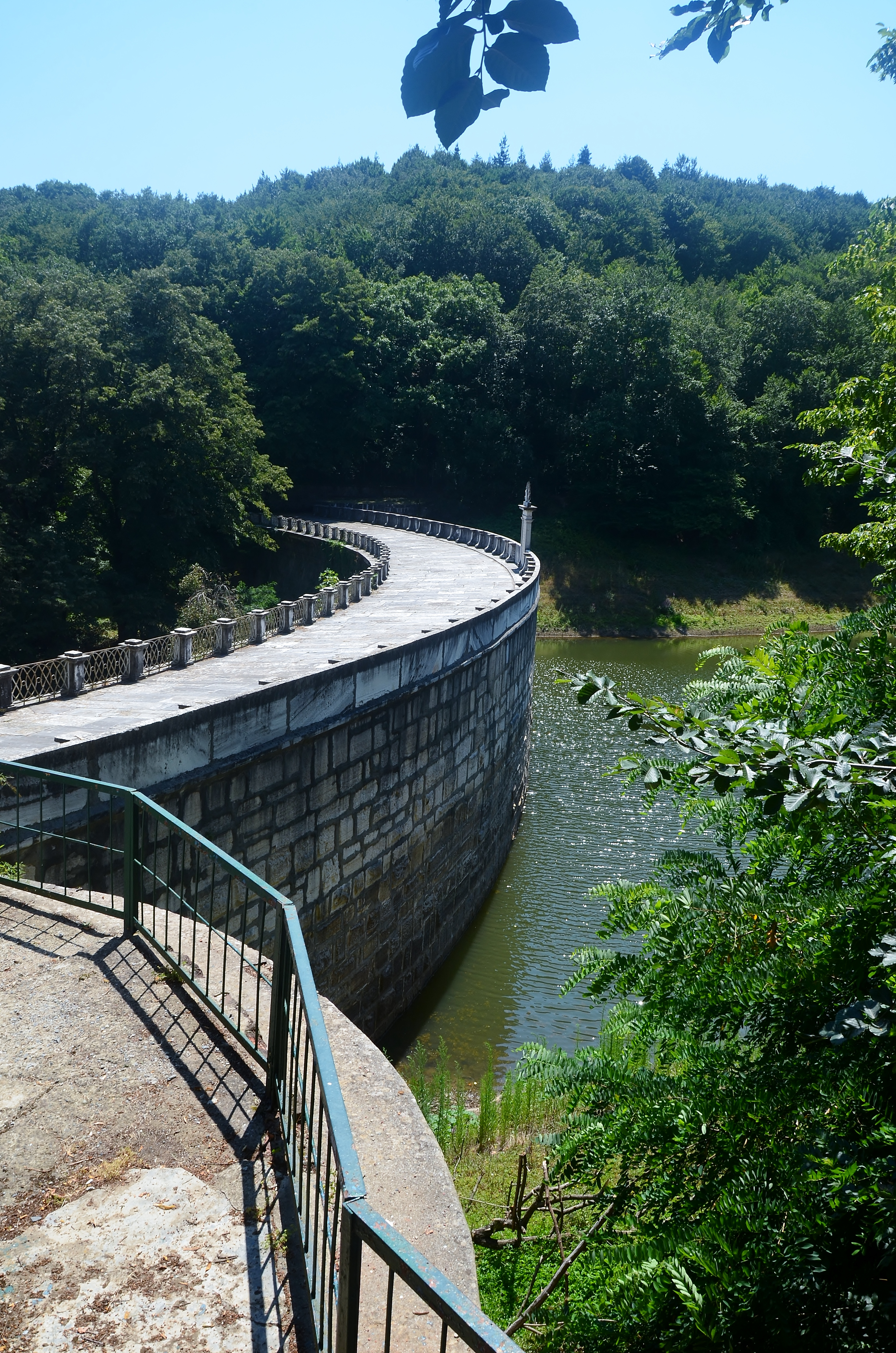
New Dam at the Bentler Nature Park inside the Belgrad Forest.

Instead of finding many Byzantine remains of aqueducts, there are mainly only Ottoman dams remaining, which were all built over a period of 150 years. The Valens Aqueduct that straddles busy Atatürk Bulvarı as it runs uphill from the Golden Horn is the largest of the monuments commemorating the complex system needed to bring the water into the city during the 16th-18th centuries.

In the forest there were two separate channeling systems. The older of the two was the Kırkçeşme system that directed water into town Eğrikapı hard against the city walls. Many of the aqueducts and reservoirs that supported this system were originally built in Roman and Byzantine times, but in the 16th century Suleiman the Magnificent commissioned the Ottoman architect Sinan to upgrade it all for the new aqueduct system that would lead into his city. The result was a series of magnificent aqueducts that criss-cross the roads near Kemerburgaz. The Maǧlova Aqueduct is the largest, with its exceptional architecture, strength and structure, and with a little effort is accessible to the public from both ends and can be safely walked through on its lower level. The Kemerburgaz aqueduct can be similarly traversed. The newly restored Uzunkemer still stands right across a busy road in the forest (not traversable).

As the population of İstanbul grew, the water supply system also had to be expanded to cope with the increasing numbers of people living in the city, which resulted in a second supply line; the Taksim system. Most of its aqueducts and reservoirs were built in the 18th century well after the reconstruction that took place earlier in the 16th century. The most noticeable monument is the Mahmud I Kemer, erected in 1732, that stands right beside the road in Bahçeköy. The Taksim system ended at the large reservoir in Taksim Square that now acts as a small art gallery used for tourism.

== Recreation and tourism ==
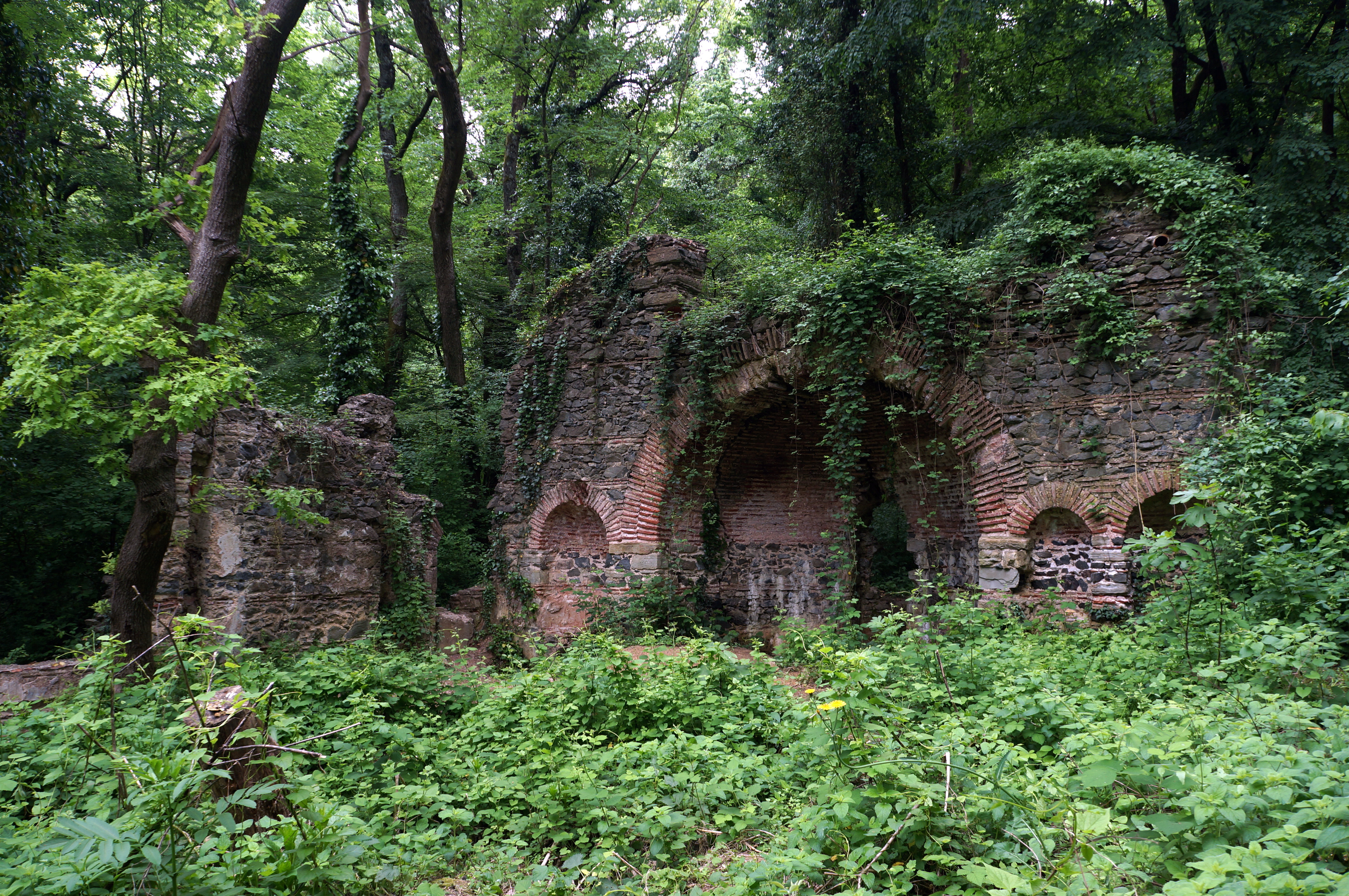
It is common to find historic ruins scattered around the forest, such as this church of St. George.

Walking, Jogging & Hiking: One of the most popular activities to do in the Belgrad Forest besides looking at the beautiful trees and enjoying nature is the fact that you can easily jog and hike through the trails. There is a jogging track that begins at a fountain by the Neset Suyu (Neset Spring) and weaves a 6 ½ km route with exercise equipment stationed along the way for public use, and the Istanbul Hash House Harriers often runs through this trail. There are many paths and tracks running through the Forest outside of the main recreational areas and a walker can pass hours in the Forest rarely meeting anyone else. The main complication is that there is no available map (satellite maps are useful for showing roads and the wider tracks but not for showing paths and fences) showing the paths and tracks - they have to be discovered. There are also some fenced-off areas and roads running through the Forest which can make finding a good walking route trickier. If going deeper into the Forest, a compass is recommended. A GPS device such as a smartphone is also very useful. The Forest is only mildly hilly and in many places can be walked through even where there is no path or track. The easiest place to start exploring the Forest is the small town of Bahçeköy which is almost in the middle of the Forest. Bahçeköy is well served by public buses. Most of the Ottoman dams and reservoirs are easily reachable from Bahçeköy.

Atatürk Arboretum: To see the forest’s foliage during the changing seasons, the best place to visit is the arboretum in the area, which is open during weekdays. In the facility, there is more than 2,000 plant species. The main attraction in the gardens is in the autumn when the collection of oak trees from all around the world can be viewed. As of 2016 the Arboretum is open every day except Mondays and entry is 5TL for students and 15TL for everyone else. The entrance is about a 20 minutes walk from the centre of Bahçeköy. A visit can easily take a couple of hours. Food (not water) is confiscated at the entrance but returned on leaving.

Eating & Drinking: One of the most common things for locals and travelers to do in Istanbul is to take a trip to the Belgrad Forest on the weekend to escape from the heat in the spring and summer months. There are areas specifically for recreation and travelers are even allowed to use portable barbecues to enjoy with friends and family. There are seven main picnic areas in the Forest; the most popular destination is Büyük Bent. This area has its own cafe where you are able to bring your own food and cook on the long wooden tables; drinks and snacks are sold on-site. If you are planning on cooking your own BBQ, it is suggested that you pay attention and use caution as firefighting facilities are not well prepared to deal with forest fires in the area. There are also a few other cafes scattered around the forest, making the area metropolis in some areas, however, most of the areas in the forest consist of wildlife.

=== Nature parks ===
There are nine nature parks in the Belgrad Forest:

- Ayvat Bendi Nature Park
- Bentler Nature Park
- Falih Rıfkı Atay Nature Park
- Fatih Çeşmesi Nature Park
- Irmak Nature Park
- Kirazlıbent Nature Park
- Kömürcübent Nature Park
- Mehmet Akif Ersoy Nature Park
- Neşet Suyu Nature Park

== See also ==
- Euxine-Colchic deciduous forests
- Balkan mixed forests
