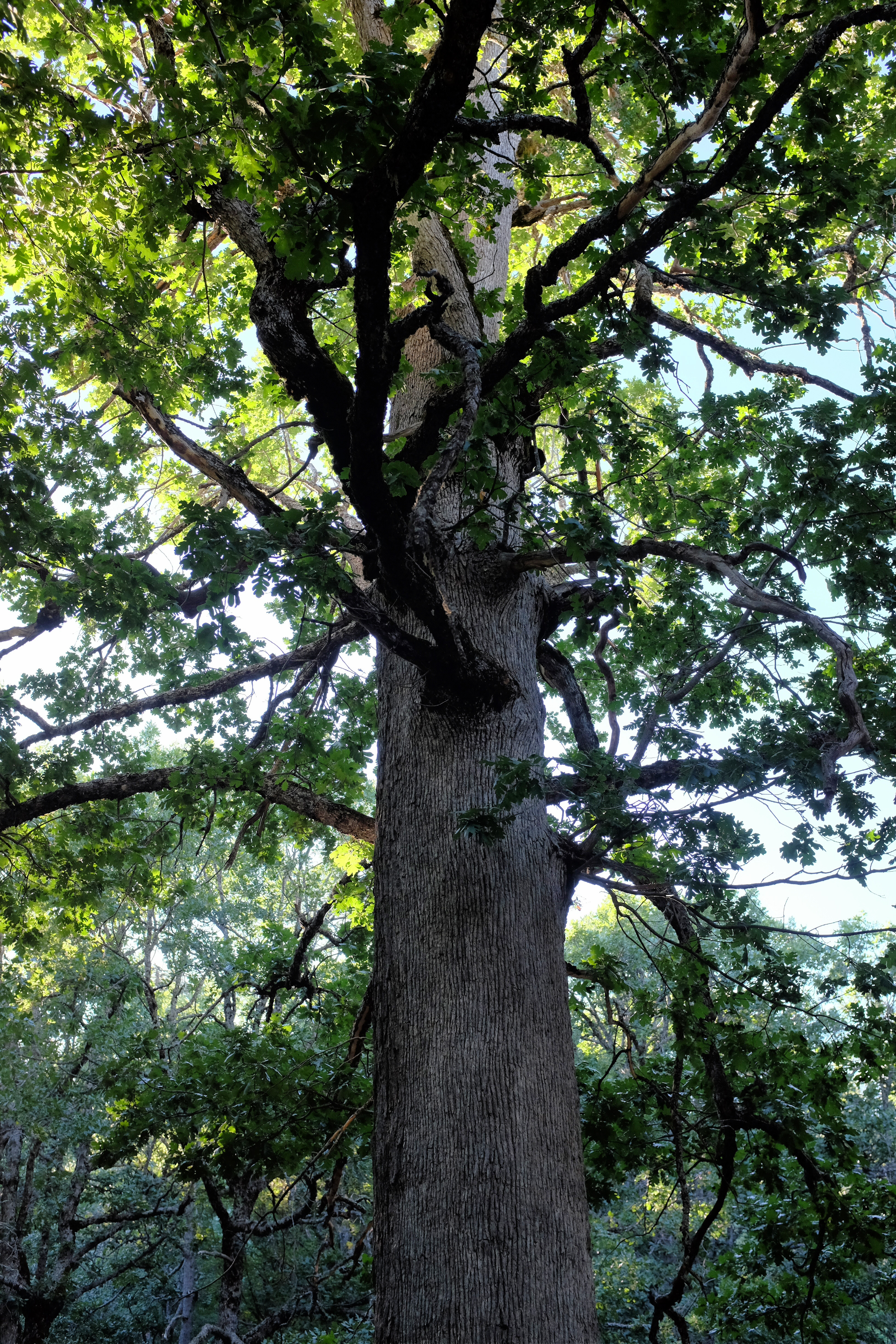

Conservation status
- Least Concern (IUCN 3.1)

Scientific classification
- Kingdom: Plantae
- Clade: Embryophytes
- Clade: Tracheophytes
- Clade: Angiosperms
- Clade: Eudicots
- Clade: Rosids
- Order: Fagales
- Family: Fagaceae
- Genus: Quercus
- Subgenus: Quercus subg. Quercus
- Section: Quercus sect. Quercus
- Species: Q. vulcanica

Binomial name
- Quercus vulcanica Boiss. & Heldr. ex Kotschy

= Quercus vulcanica =

Kasnak oak

Species of flowering plant

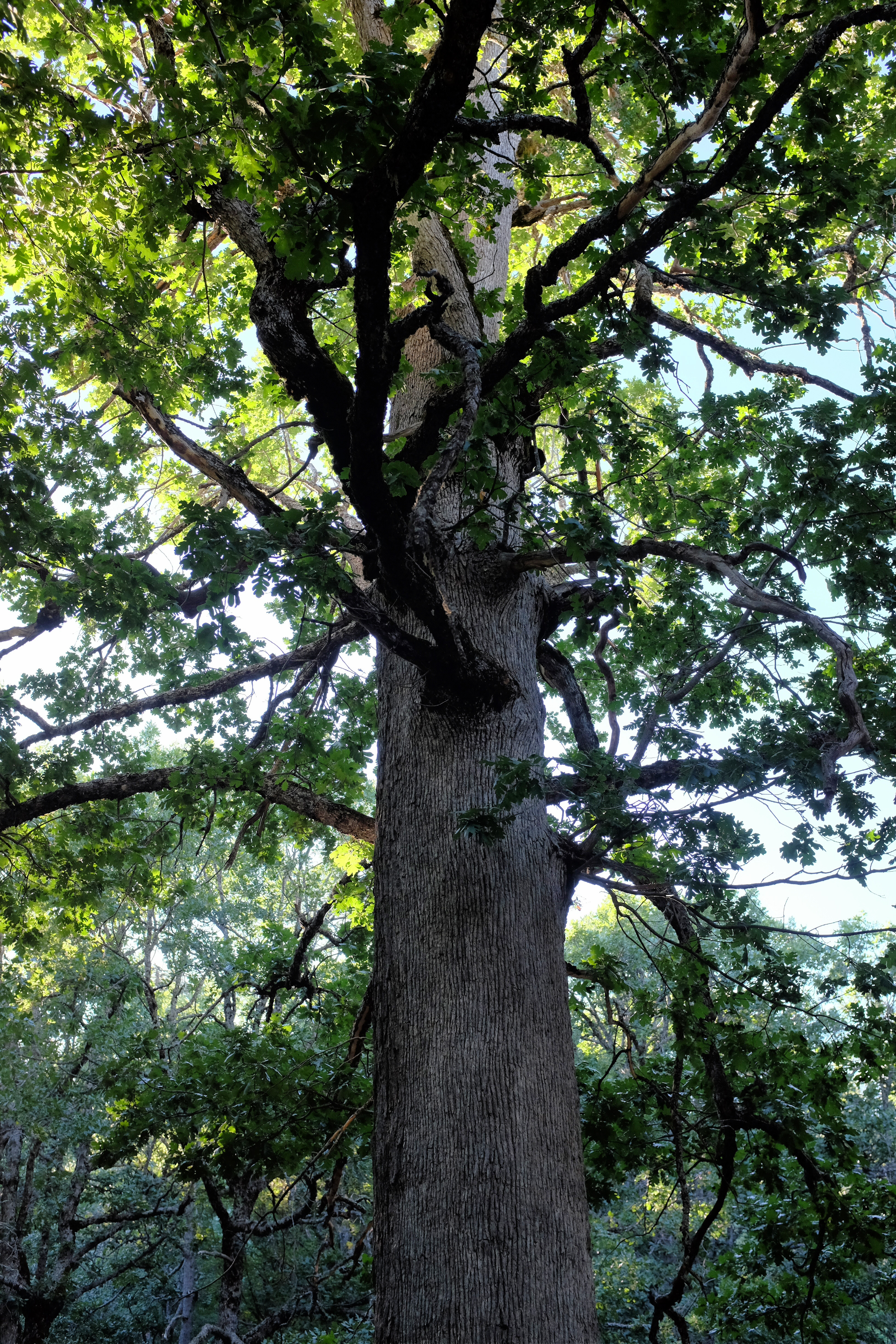
Quercus vulcanica located in Isparta Province, Turkey

Quercus vulcanica is a species of flowering plant in the Fagaceae family. It is referred to by the common name Kasnak oak, and is a rare species of tree native to Lebanon, Syria, and Turkey. It is placed in section Quercus.

Quercus vulcanica is highly valued in its native region as a source of lumber and also as an ornamental. It is a large tree up to 33 metres (108 feet) tall, with a trunk sometimes attaining 150 centimetres (59 inches) in diameter. The bark is gray and fissured. The leaves are up to 16 cm (6 1/4 in) long, egg-shaped with deep lobes, green on the top but yellow-green on the underside.
