= Bahçeköy, Sarıyer =

Bahçeköy
- Neighbourhood
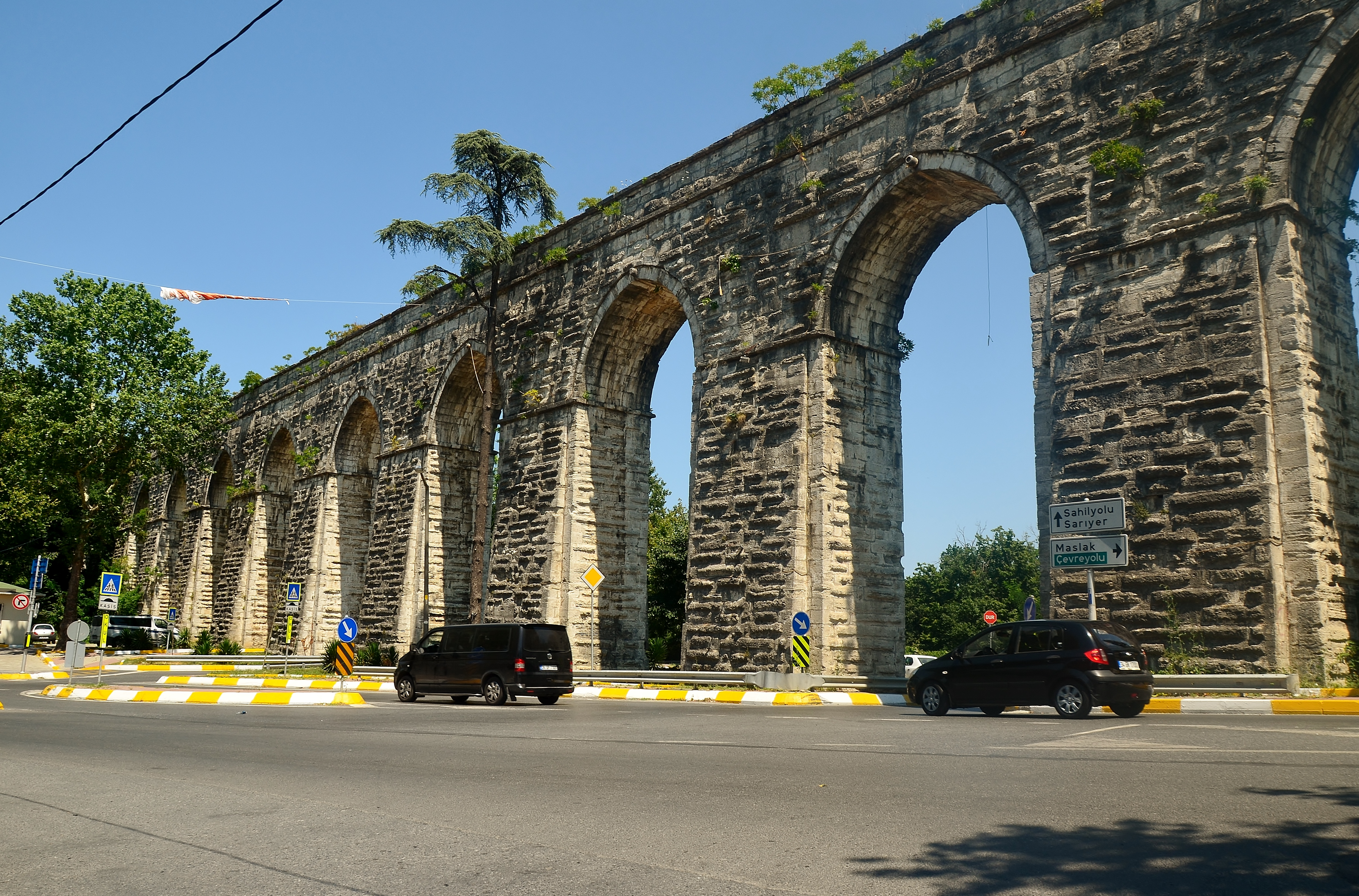
- Bahçeköy Aqueduct

- Location within Turkey Location within Istanbul
- Coordinates: 41°10′12″N 28°59′33″E
- Country: Turkey
- Province: Istanbul
- District: Sarıyer
- Population (2022): 3,737
- Time zone: UTC+3 (TRT)
- Postal code: 34473
- Area code: 0212

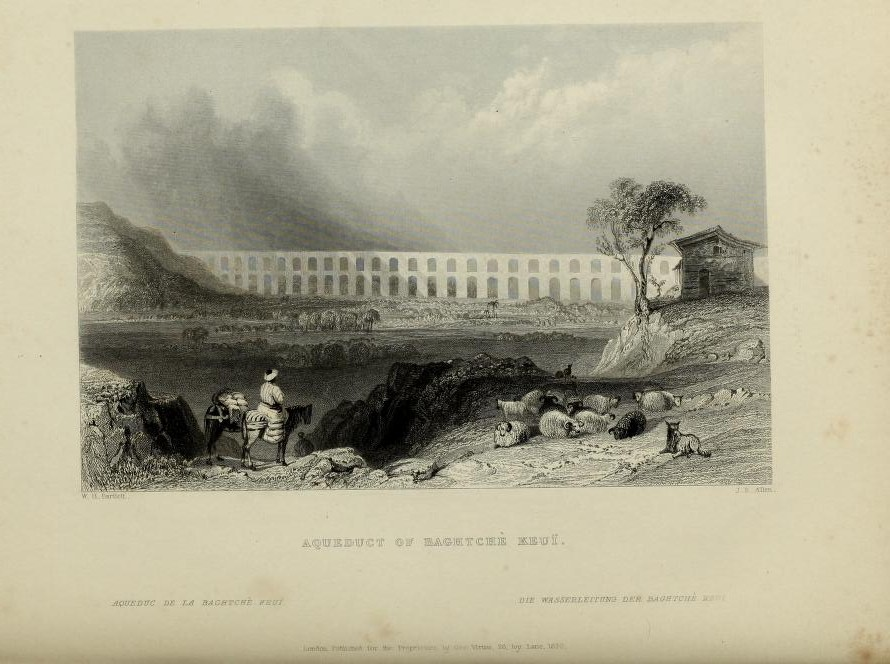
Aqueduct of Bahçeköy in İstanbul between 1809–1838

Bahçeköy or Bahçeköy Merkez is a neighbourhood in the municipality and district of Sarıyer, Istanbul Province, Turkey. Its population is 3,737 (2022).

Bahçeköy is situated 8 km (5.0 mi) from Sarıyer. It is bordered by Fatih Forest, Çayırbaşı, Büyükdere, Kemerburgaz, Zekeriyaköy and Gümüşdere.

Institutions within its boundaries are Faculty of Forestry, Forestry Administration, Water and Sewerage Authority. A number of historic dams, Belgrad Forest, Bentler Nature Park, Atatürk Arboretum are visitor attractions of Bahçeköy.

With annual precipitation around 1,200 millimetres (47 in), Bahçeköy is the wettest place in Istanbul.

== History ==
The establishment of Bahçeköy goes back to 1521 in the Ottoman Empire. Later, Muslim Turks from Salonica Vilayet, former territory of the Ottoman Empire, were settled here in the frame of population exchange between Greece and Turkey agreed with the Treaty of Lausanne in 1923. The settlement received migration from all over Turkey. As of 2010, the population of Bahçeköy is 3,870.

Following a local referendum, the settlement gained the right to be converted from a village status into a municipality. The first mayor election took place in 1997. It was merged into the municipality of Sarıyer in 2008.

== See also ==
- Topuzlu Dam, built in 1750
- Valide Dam, built in 1796
- New Dam, built in 1830
