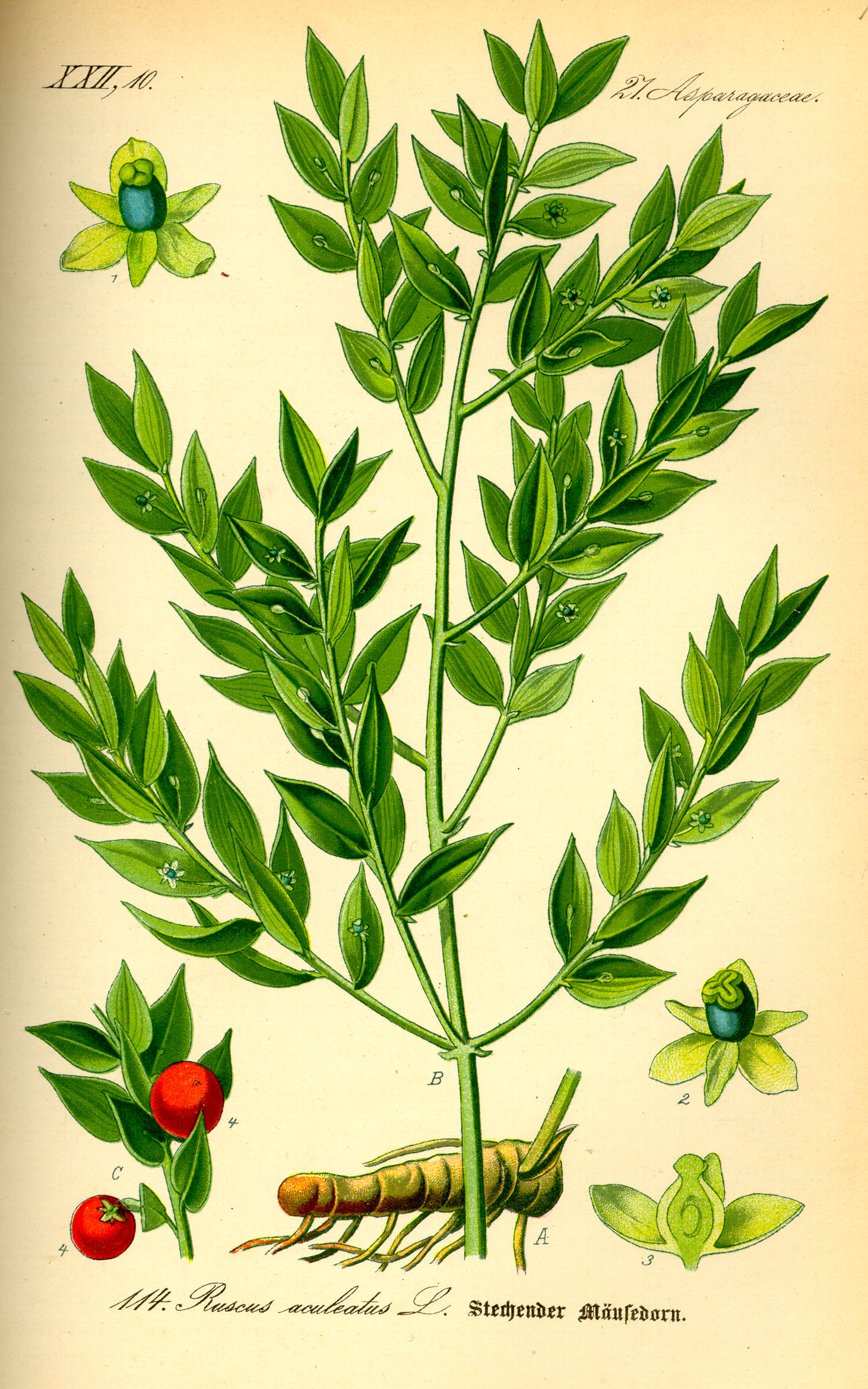

Scientific classification
- Kingdom: Plantae
- Clade: Tracheophytes
- Clade: Angiosperms
- Clade: Monocots
- Order: Asparagales
- Family: Asparagaceae
- Subfamily: Convallarioideae
- Genus: Ruscus
- Species: R. aculeatus

Binomial name
- Ruscus aculeatus L.

Synonyms
- Oxymyrsine pungens Bubani; Ruscus flexuosus Mill.; Ruscus laxus Sm.; Ruscus parasiticus Gueldenst.; Ruscus ponticus Woronow

= Ruscus aculeatus =

Butcher's-broom

Species of shrub

Ruscus aculeatus, known as butcher's-broom, is a low evergreen dioecious Eurasian shrub, with flat shoots known as cladodes that give the appearance of stiff, spine-tipped leaves. Small greenish flowers appear in spring, and are borne singly in the centre of the cladodes. The female flowers are followed by a red berry, and the seeds are bird-distributed, but the plant also spreads vegetatively by means of rhizomes. It is native to Eurasia and some northern parts of Africa. Ruscus aculeatus occurs in woodlands and hedgerows, where it is tolerant of deep shade, and also on coastal cliffs. Likely due to its attractive winter/spring color, Ruscus aculeatus has become a fairly common landscape plant. It is also widely planted in gardens, and has spread as a garden escapee in many areas outside its native range. The plant grows well in zones 7 to 9 on the USDA hardiness zone map.

The Latin specific epithet aculeatus means "prickly".

== History ==
=== Etymology ===
The common name, butcher's broom, hails from one of its original uses. In Europe, Ruscus species were traditionally harvested for their flat and stiff branches to make small brooms that were used for clearing off and cleaning butchering blocks. Recent research has uncovered that butcher's broom contains some antibacterial compounds. This suggests that in addition to the functional physical properties of Ruscus species, increased effectiveness in cleaning and producing safer products due to unrecognized antibacterial oils may have contributed to its popularity and subsequent nickname.

=== Traditional medicinal usage ===
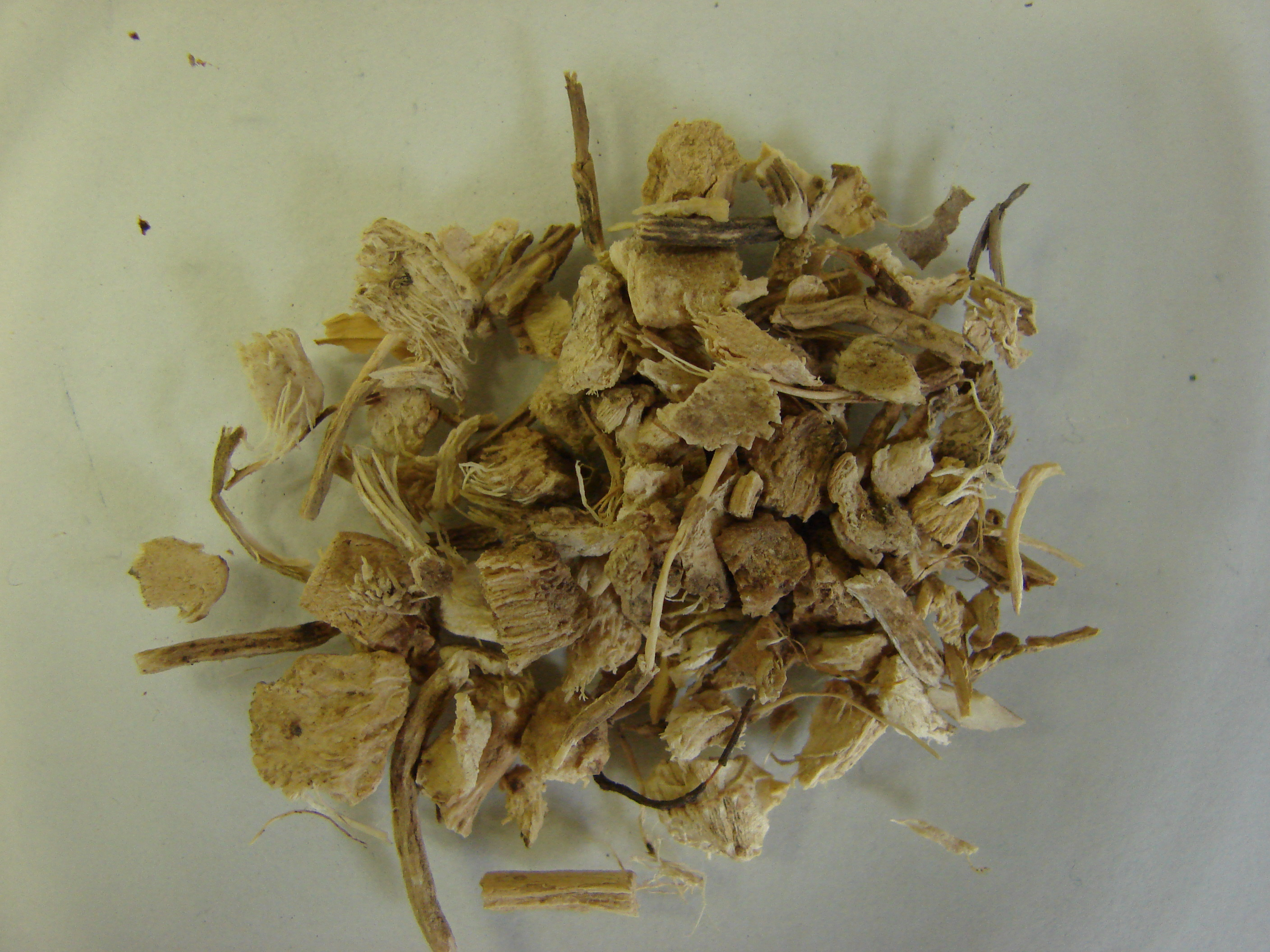
Ruscus aculeatus rhizoma used in traditional medicine

Butcher's broom has been used by a variety of peoples as a treatment for a variety of ailments. A classical remedy from Europe claimed that the rhizomes could be used as a diuretic. In ancient Greece, butcher's broom was used as a laxative or diuretic, and it was also believed to remove kidney stones when added to wine. Butcher's broom was also used to reduce swelling and to speed the recovery of fractures.

== Description ==
Grows to length of 80 cm (31 in) with stiff branches bearing cladodes (stems modified to look like leaves) up to 4 cm (1.6 in) long, while the true leaves are reduced to scales less than 5 mm. Flowers grow from axils of small bracts on the adaxial (upper) side of cladodes. The 6 tepals are pale green, and the ovary or stamens are violet (dioecious plant). Fruit about 1 cm red, thick and rigid.

== Distribution ==
In Great Britain it has been recorded from southern England to north Wales. In north-eastern Ireland it is extremely rare growing wild but has been recorded in Counties Down and Antrim.

== Phytochemicals ==
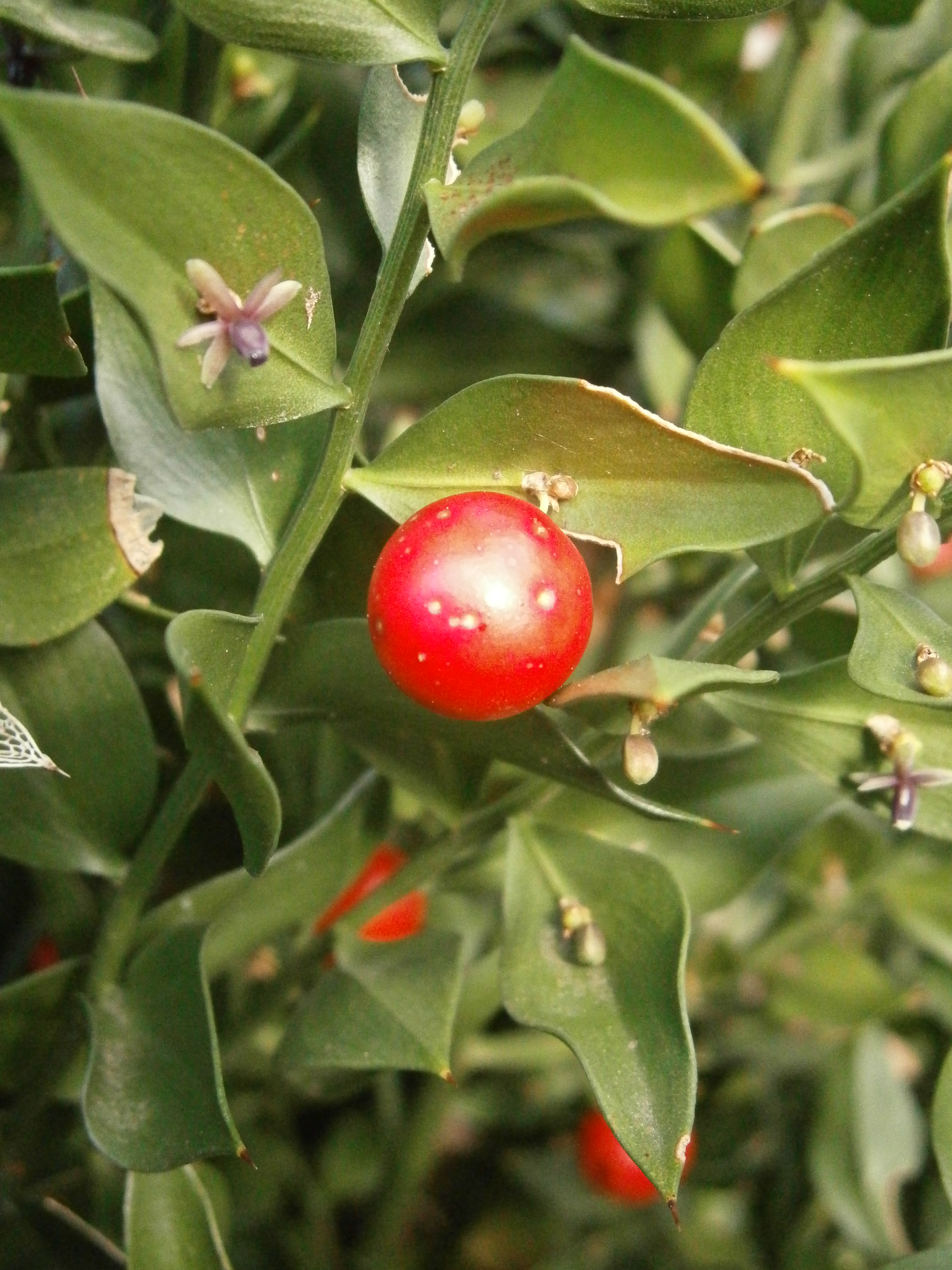
Flowers and fruits

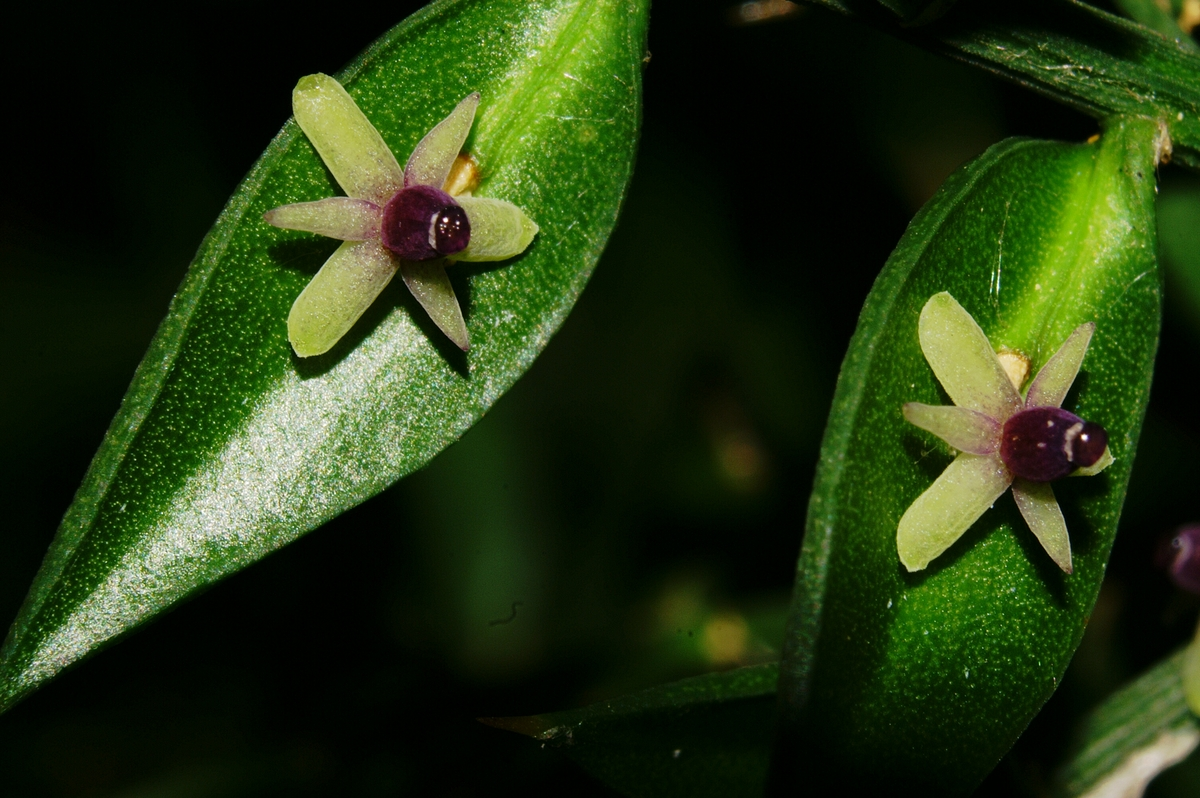
Close-up of flowers

The major phytochemicals in butcher's broom are steroidal saponins. Saponins occur naturally in plants as glycosides and have foam forming properties. The specific saponins found in butcher's broom are ruscogenins, ruscogenen and neoruscogenin, named for the genus Ruscus. Ruscogenins function as anti-inflammatory agents and are also believed to cause constriction in veins. Currently the mode of action of ruscogenins is not well understood, but one proposed mechanism suggests that ruscogenins suppresses leukocyte migration through both protein and mRNA regulation. Neoruscogenin has been identified as a potent and high-affinity agonist of the nuclear receptor RORα (NR1F1).

Newer research has also uncovered that there are polyphenols present in butcher's broom which may also be physiologically active, possibly as an antioxidant. As of yet there is not enough evidence to make a conclusion, but since they have now been synthesized in labs further research should be in progress.

=== Toxicity ===
The Milan Poison Control Centre handled 107 R. aculeatus poisoning cases in the period 1995–2007; subsequently 4 acute poisoning cases were recorded for the 2010–2011 season in Lombardy. The majority of cases were children who had consumed the attractive berries.

== Cultivars ==
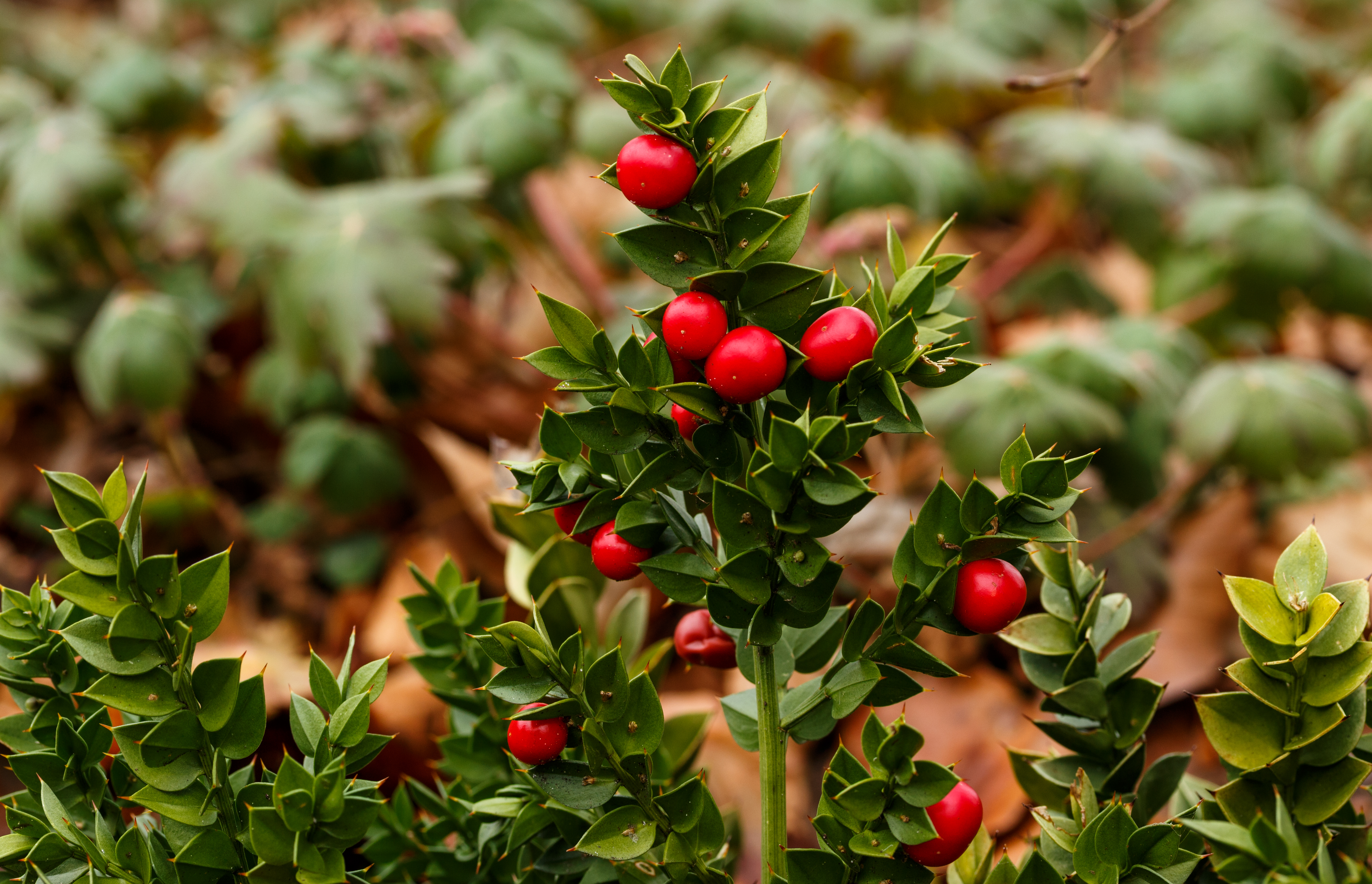
'John Redmond' cultivar

The dwarf cultivar 'John Redmond', growing to 50 cm (20 in) tall by 100 cm (39 in) broad, has gained the Royal Horticultural Society's Award of Garden Merit.

Other cultivars include 'Christmas Berry'.

== Bibliography ==
- Sadarmin, Praveen P.; Timperley, Jonathan (2013). "An Unusual Case of Butcher's Broom Precipitating Diabetic Ketoacidosis". The Journal of Emergency Medicine. 45 (3): e63–e65. doi:10.1016/j.jemermed.2012.11.087. eISSN 1090-1280. PMID 23849361.
- Banfi, Enrico; Colombo, Maria Laura; Davanzo, Franca; Falciola, Chiara; Galasso, Gabriele; Martino, Emanuela; Perego, Sandro (2012). "Piante velenose della flora italiana nell'esperienza del Centro Antiveleni di Milano" [Poisonous Plants of the Italian Flora in the Experience of the Milan Poison Control Centre] (PDF). Natura: Rivista di Scienze Naturali (in Italian). 102 (1). ISSN 0369-6243.
