= Pitheci Portus =

Town of ancient Thrace

Coordinates: 41°07′46″N 29°03′41″E

Pitheci Portus was a town of ancient Thrace, inhabited during Roman times.

Its site is located to the South of Sariyer, on the European side of Istanbul.
