= 2026 Istanbul floods =

Floods in Istanbul, Turkey, in October 2026

Floods in Istanbul
- Date: October 14, 2026
- Location: Istanbul
- Deaths: 8
- Missing: 6

The 2026 Istanbul floods were floods that struck the Marmara Region of Turkey on October 14, 2026. The disaster primarily affected Istanbul, resulting in at least 8 deaths and 6 people going missing.

== Background ==
Heavy downpours that began on the morning of October 14 intensified with increasing speed as the day progressed, causing rivers to overflow their banks and resulting in flooding.

== Consequences ==
As a result of the flood, 8 people died, the Ayazaga neighborhood of Sarıyer and surrounding areas were inundated, and the operation of some public transport routes was suspended due to the flooding. Shopping centers were forced to temporarily suspend operations, and it has been reported that 6 people are missing. With approximately 277.1 mm of rain, the volume of precipitation reached its highest level recorded since 1942. Following the disaster, the water in the Bosporus turned brown due to the ground becoming saturated with water.

=== Impact on reservoirs ===
Water levels in reservoirs have risen sharply due to heavy rainfall. The occupancy level of reservoirs in Istanbul increased by 6% following the initial night of rain. Rising by another 3% on the second day, the water level—based on measurements taken on the morning of October 17, 2026—climbed from 38% to 48% compared to the morning of October 14. The occupancy rate of the Omerli Reservoir, the primary water source for the Anatolian side of Istanbul, rose from 54% to 66%. The increase in the Omerli Reservoir alone is equivalent to approximately 10 days worth of water demand for the entire city of Istanbul.

On October 15, 2026, Istanbul's Vali (Governor) Davud Gul, speaking at the Disaster and Emergency Coordination Center, stated that the city had experienced its heaviest rainfall in the last 84 years.
