= British International School Istanbul =

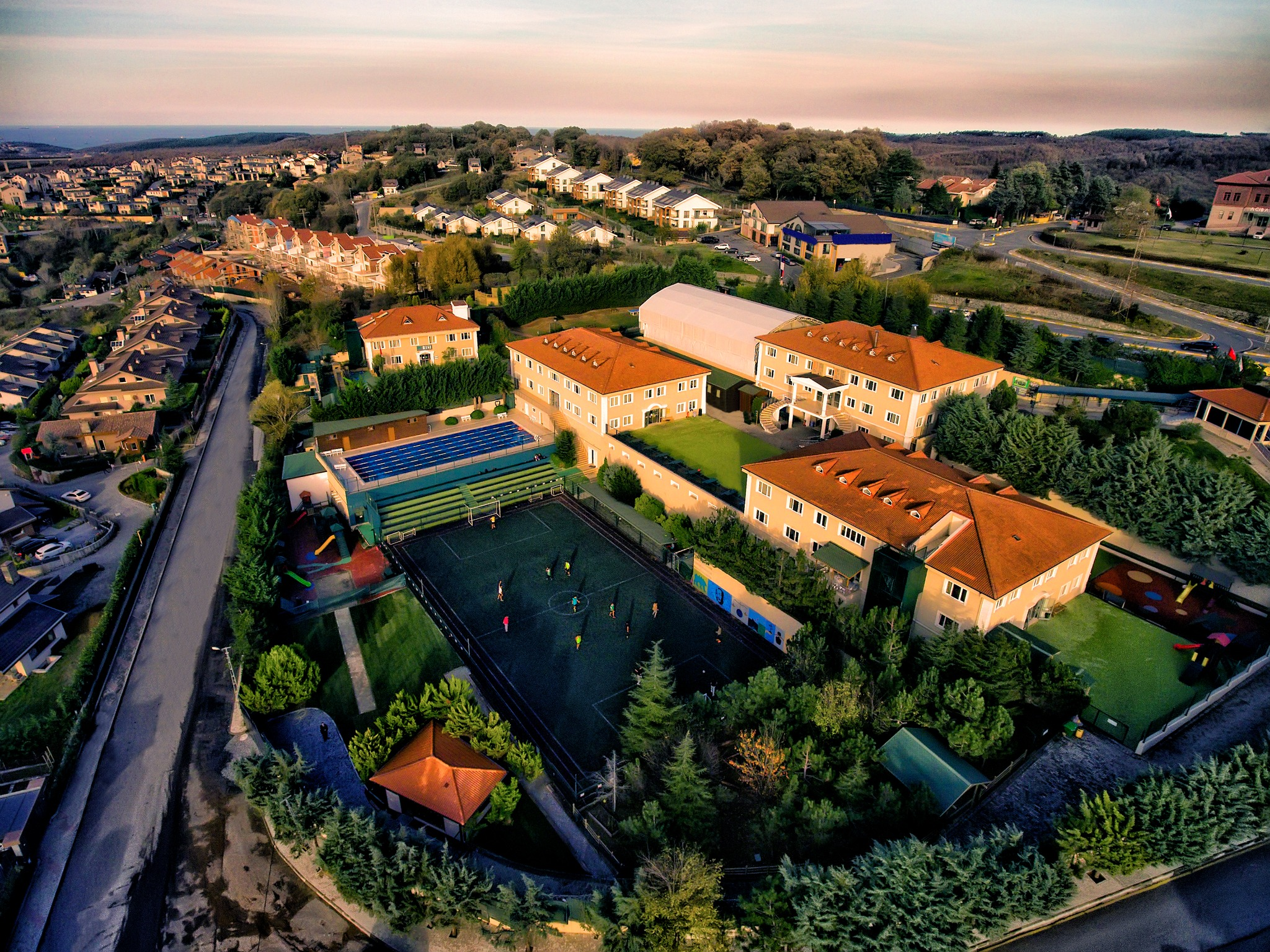

Location
- Istanbul; Turkey
- Coordinates: 41.205323°N 29.040061000000037°E

Information
- Type: Private, coeducational
- CEEB code: 696462
- Campuses: City and Suburban
- Nickname: BISI
- Website: http://www.bis.k12.tr

The British International School Istanbul (BISI) is a private international primary and secondary school in Istanbul, Turkey, offering a modified English National Curriculum, IGCSE and the International Baccalaureate Diploma Programme. The school comprises three campuses: a city campus in Etiler, Beşiktaş, serving preschool and primary students; a campus in Zekeriyaköy, Sarıyer, accommodating students from preschool to secondary education. The student body represents over 60 nationalities, with ages ranging from 3 to 18 years. As a private international institution, the school prepares its graduates for higher education, with many pursuing university studies. Graduates frequently pursue higher education at institutions in the United Kingdom and the United States.

It has three campuses:

- BISI STEAM Campus in Etiler, Beşiktaş, serving early years foundation stage and primary school. The current facility opened in January 2017
- Zekeriyaköy Forest Campus in Zekeriyaköy, Sarıyer serves all educational stages from preschool through senior school/sixth form
