= Fatih Sultan Mehmet, Sarıyer =

Fatih Sultan Mehmet
- Neighbourhood
- Location in Turkey Fatih Sultan Mehmet (Istanbul)
- Coordinates: 41°05′43″N 29°02′10″E
- Country: Turkey
- Province: Istanbul
- District: Sarıyer
- Population (2022): 15,725
- Time zone: UTC+3 (TRT)

Fatih Sultan Mehmet is a neighbourhood in the municipality and district of Sarıyer, Istanbul Province, Turkey. Its population is 15,725 as of 2022. It lies next to the TEM highway.

The parts of the neighbourhood close to the TEM are called Büyük Armutlu, and the parts further away are called Küçük Armutlu. A significant Alevi population settled in Küçük Armutlu from the Anatolian cities of Tokat, Sivas, Amasya, Kahramanmaraş and Tunceli. Büyük Armutlu is connected to Etiler by Narin Bridge. According to data from 2004, the literacy rate of women living in the neighbourhood is 80% and only 10% of this population is working. Most houses in the neighbourhood have a view of the Bosphorus Strait.
