= Sarıyer =

- District and municipality
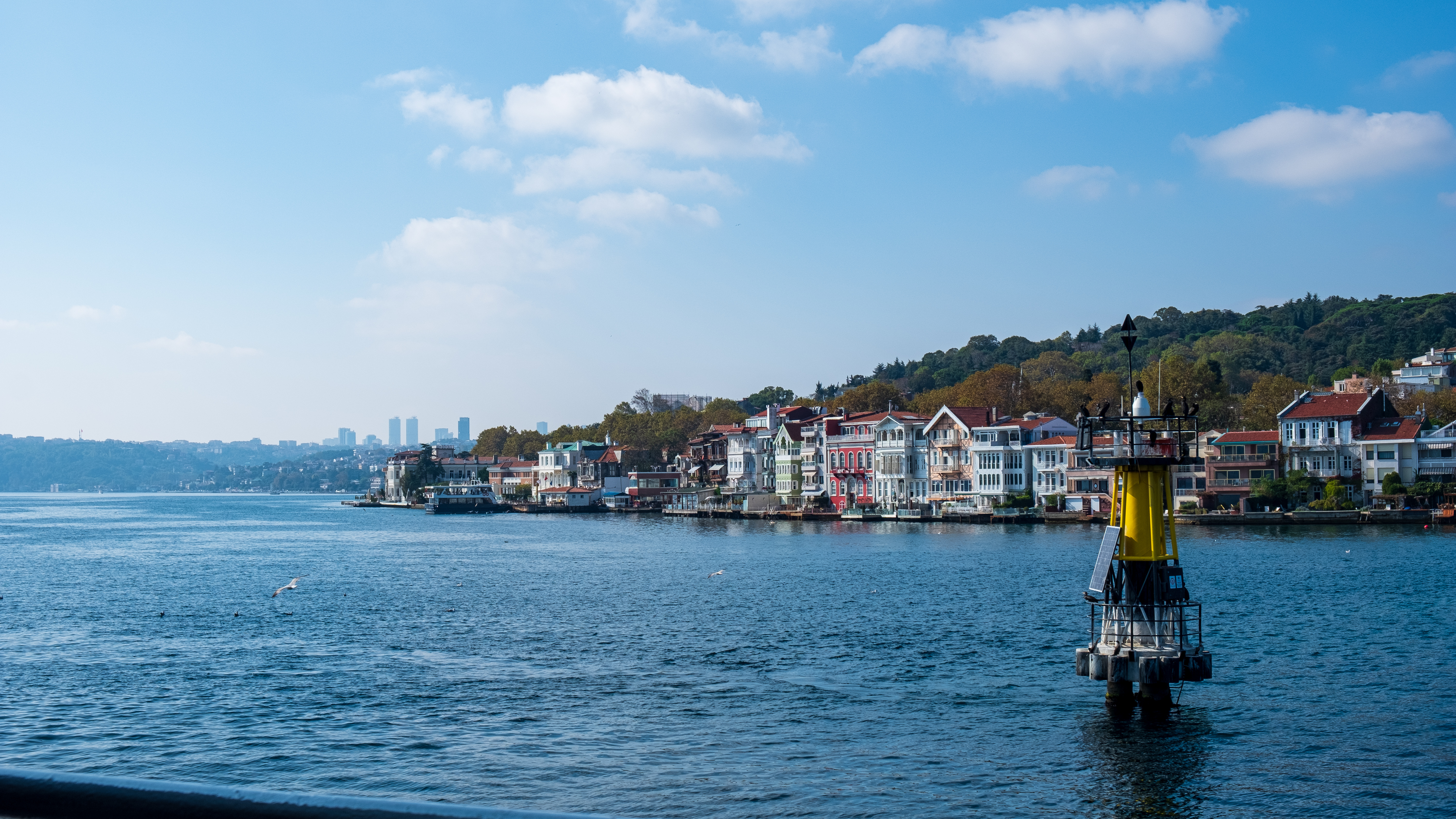
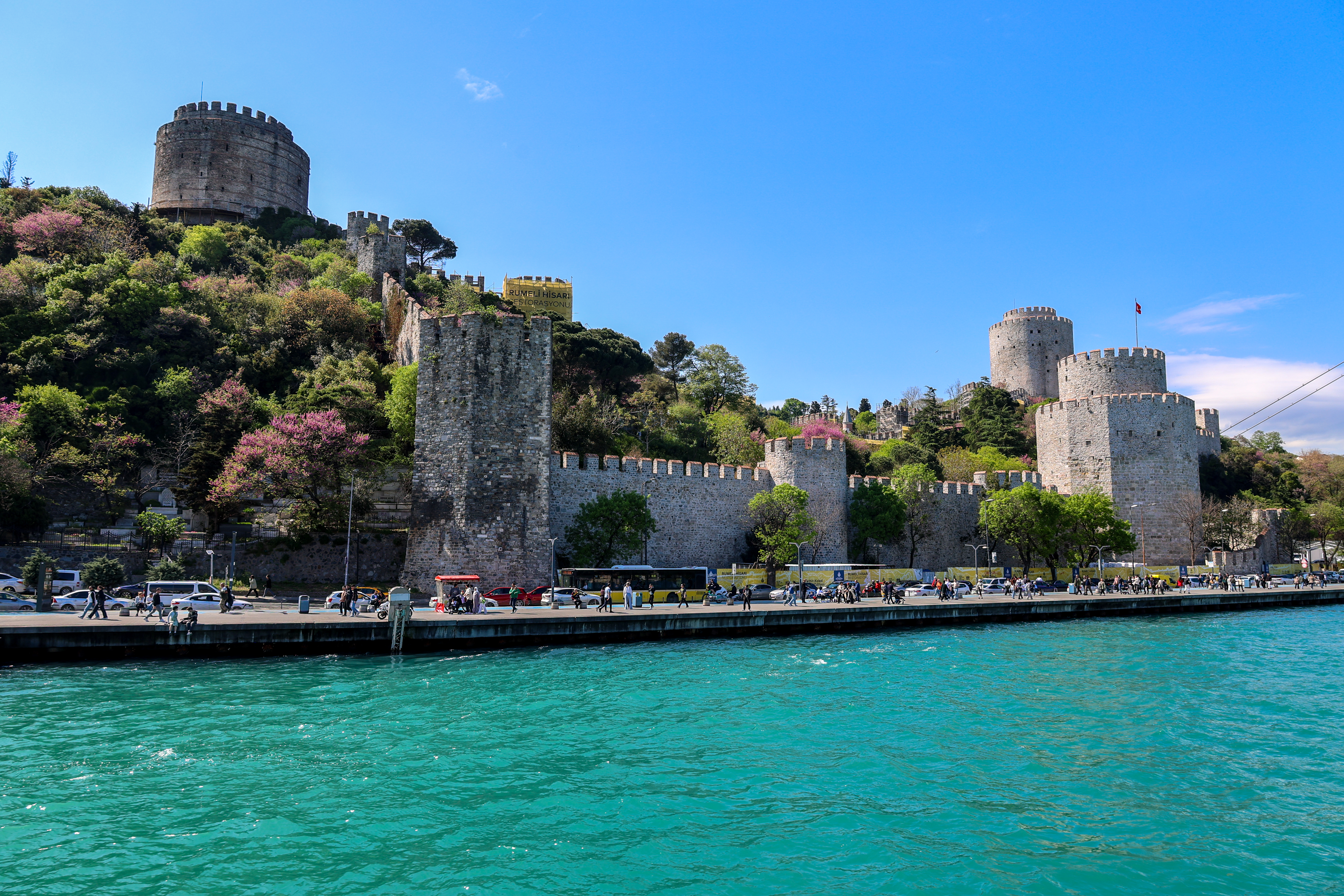
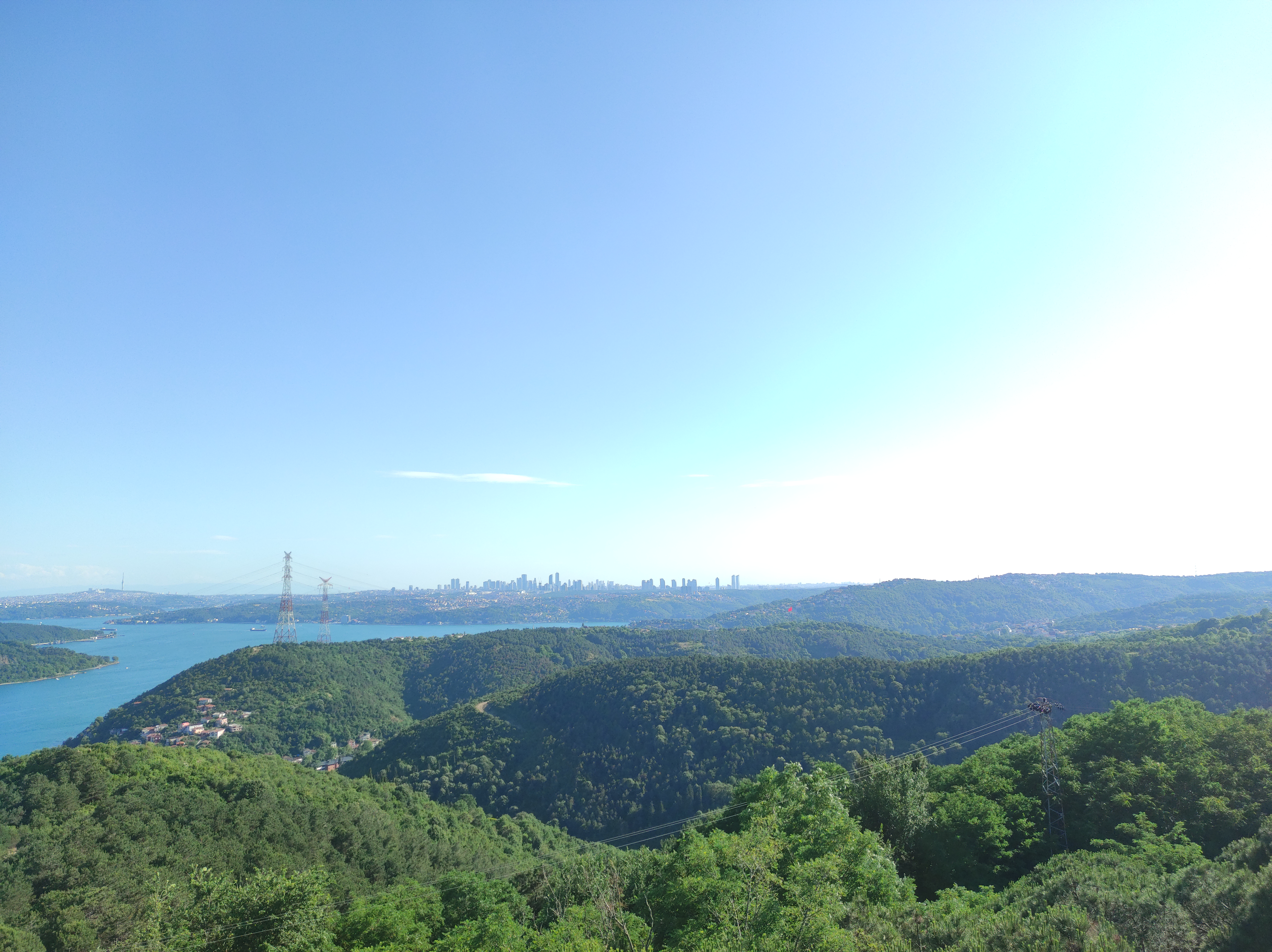
- Yeniköy Rumelihisarı Sarıyer as seen from the bird observatory tower

- Logo

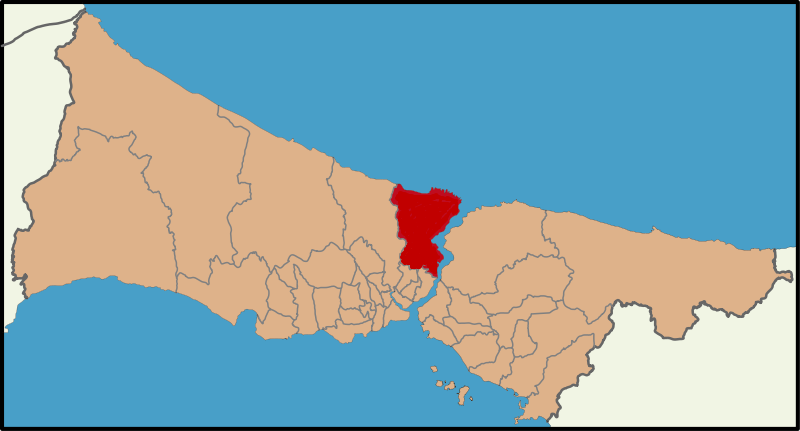
- Map showing Sarıyer District in Istanbul Province

- Location within Turkey Location within Istanbul
- Coordinates: 41°10′01″N 29°03′26″E
- Country: Turkey
- Province: Istanbul

Government
  - Mayor: Mustafa Oktay Aksu (CHP)
- Area: 177 km^{2} (68 sq mi)
- Population (2022): 350,454
  - Density: 1,980/km^{2} (5,130/sq mi)
- Time zone: UTC+3 (TRT)
- Area code: 0212
- Website: www.sariyer.bel.tr

Sarıyer (pronounced [saˈɾɯjeɾ]) is a municipality and district of Istanbul Province, Turkey. Its area is 177 km^{2} and its population is 350,454 (2022). It is on the northeastern part of Istanbul's European side. Sarıyer also administers the Black Sea coast to the west of the mouth of the Bosphorus, including the neighbourhood of Kilyos. It borders Eyüpsultan to the northwest, Beşiktaş to the south and Kağıthane to the west. The mayor is Mustafa Oktay Aksu of the Republican People's Party (CHP).

== History ==
It is the site of the ancient Greek city of Phinopolis (Greek: Φινούπολις), which was founded on an existent Thracian settlement. Sarıyer's Bosphorus villages, backed by steep hills, were once rural fishing communities. In the 18th century, palace officials and other people close to the Ottoman sultan started building their yalıs on the coastline. Around this time, wealthy foreign traders of Pera and Galata built summer residences in the area. In the beginning of the 19th century, the embassies, located in Istanbul proper, started acquiring plots of lands to build summer residences. Despite all this development, the villages remained quiet fishing towns up until the 1950s. In the 1950s and 60s, the Sarıyer villages were considered "holiday towns" for the people living in Istanbul. However, since the construction of the coast road, these villages, and increasingly the hillsides behind them, rapidly urbanized. By the 1980s, the coastal areas were full of newly built, expensive apartments, while the hillsides being built up with illegal housing called gecekondu.

The district Sarıyer was established in 1930 from parts of the districts of Beyoğlu and Çatalca. The district's boundaries shrunk after the neighbourhood of Kemerburgaz was given to the Eyüp district in 1936 and when the villages of Maslak and Ayazağa were given to Şişli district in 1954. The present boundaries of Sarıyer were created after incorporating the neighbourhoods of Maslak, Ayazağa and Huzur from the district of Şişli in 2012.

== Composition ==
There are 38 neighbourhoods in Sarıyer District:

- Ayazağa (includes Vadistanbul business district)
- Bahçeköy Kemer
- Bahçeköy Merkez
- Bahçeköy Yeni
- Baltalimanı
- Büyükdere
- Çamlıtepe
- Çayırbaşı
- Cumhuriyet
- Darüşşafaka
- Demirciköy
- Emirgan
- Fatih Sultan Mehmet
- Ferahevler
- Garipçe
- Gümüşdere
- Huzur
- İstinye
- Kazım Karabekir Paşa
- Kilyos (Kumköy)
- Kireçburnu
- Kısırkaya
- Kocataş
- Maden
- Maslak
- Pınar
- Poligon
- PTT Evleri
- Reşitpaşa
- Rumelifeneri
- Rumelihisarı
- Rumelikavağı
- Sarıyer
- Tarabya
- Uskumruköy
- Yeni
- Yeniköy
- Zekeriyaköy

== Sarıyer today ==
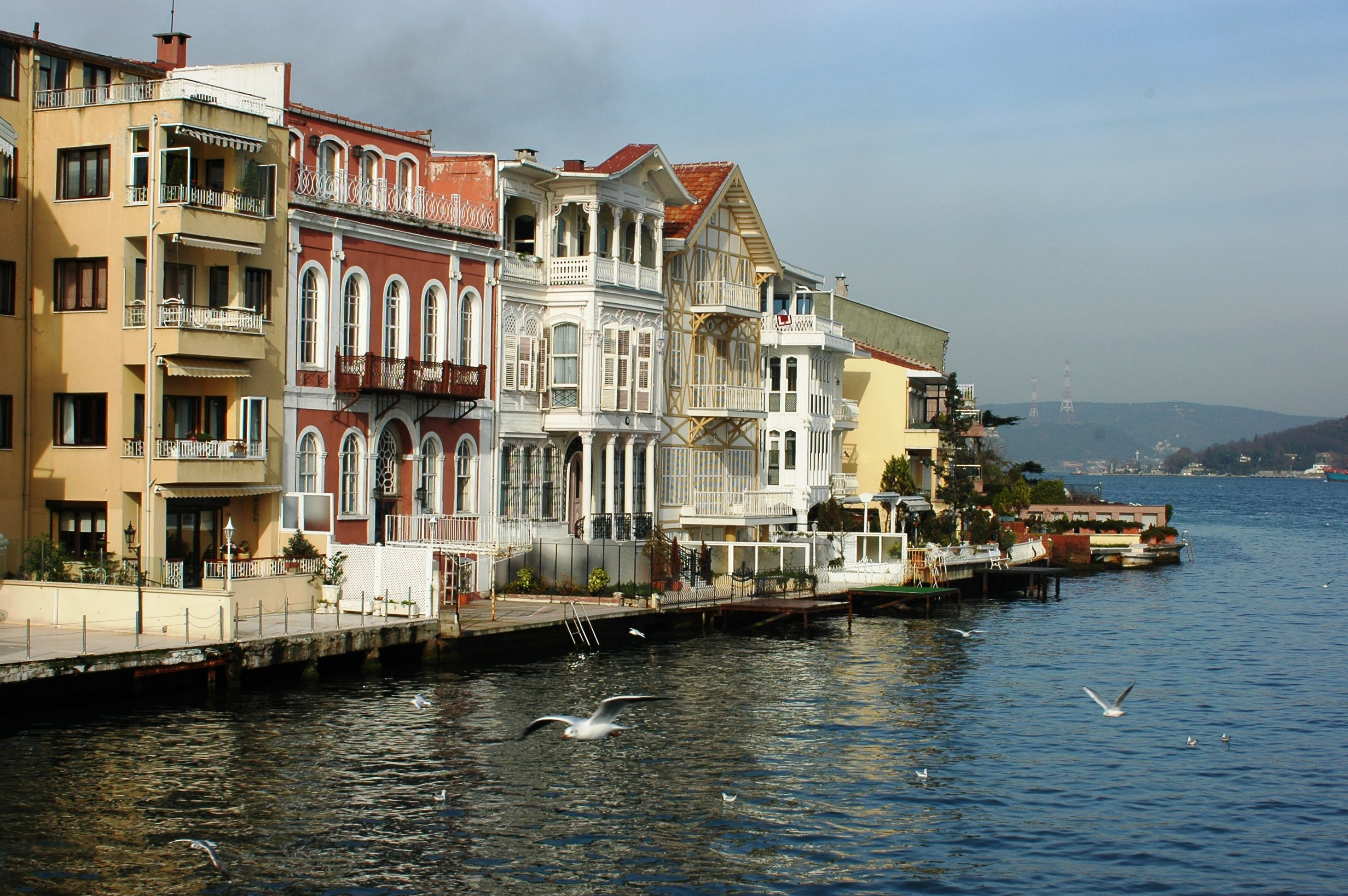
Yeniköy

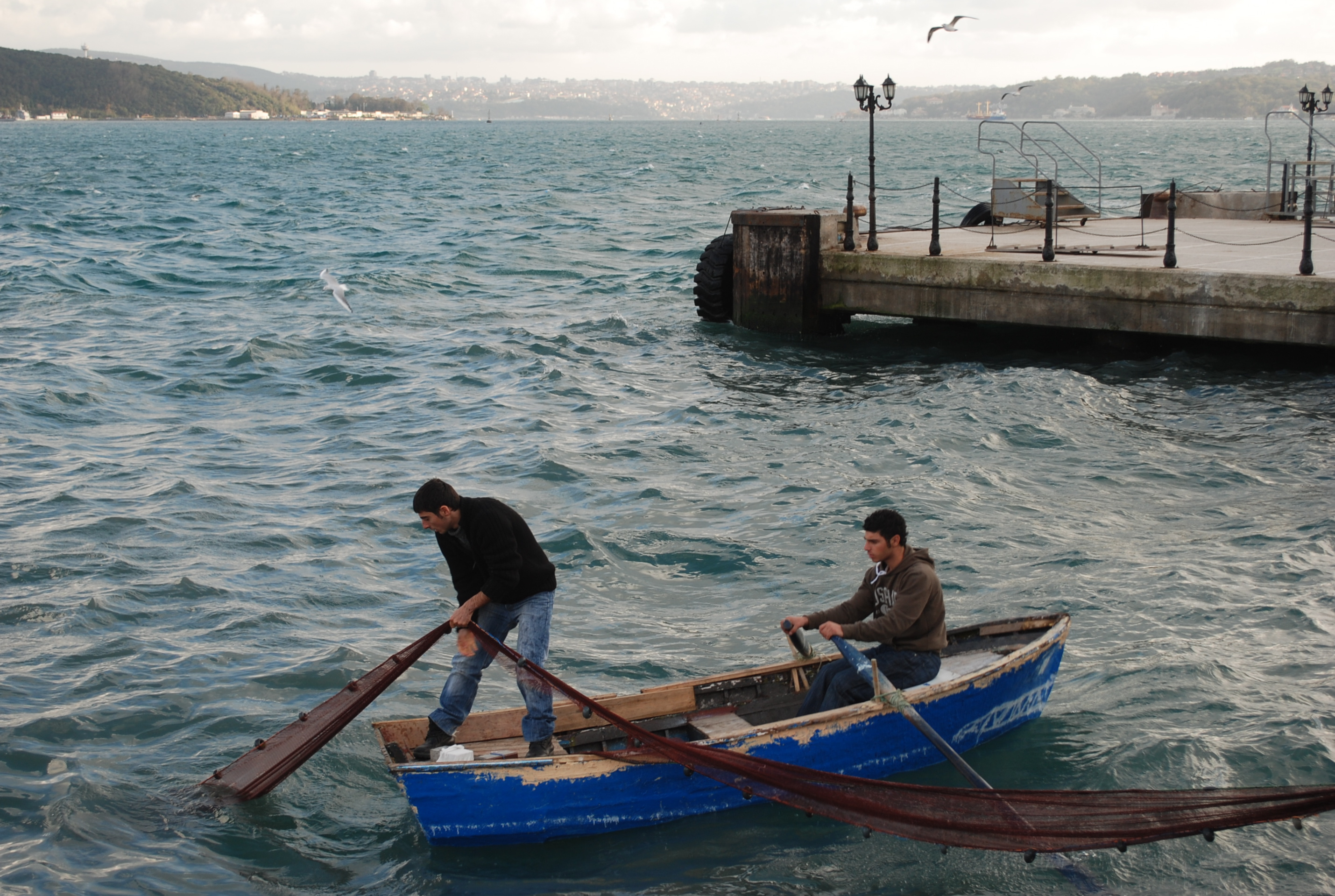
Fishermen in Sarıyer's harbour

Sarıyer is connected to downtown Istanbul by Büyükdere Avenue, the main road from Beşiktaş up to Maslak and beyond. There is also high-speed ferry boat service for commuting to the city. The M2 metro line runs via Maslak to Hacıosman.

Sarıyer itself is a traditional working-class Turkish suburb and has suffered from lacking infrastructure. The industry feeds the local fish market and a long line of famous fish restaurants. There are also a variety of cafés, kebab houses and bars, where many of İstanbul's residents come to eat and drink on weekends.

Emirgan is former retreat from the city, backed by a hillside still green despite the recent construction of villas within it. The district is named after Emir Güne Han, a Persian nobleman who was given 50 hectares of land in the area in 1635 by Murad IV after he surrendered Yerevan without a fight. There is a square in the center, shaded by a huge plane tree, with a cafe in the middle. It is home to the Sakıp Sabancı Museum. Emirgan Korusu, which hosts the Emirgan Tulip Festival annually, is also located in the neighborhood.

Reşitpaşa is a crowded district on the hill above Emirgan. It has both attractive villas and illegal gecekondu housing on a forested hillside. The modern campus of the Istanbul Stock Exchange is nearby, along with one of the campuses of Istanbul Technical University.

Istinye is a fishing port, which once contained a shipyard, with a village behind and tea gardens by the sea. As in so many other areas, luxury condos now rise from Istinye's hillsides. In 2003 the new American consulate was built here. One of Istanbul's most popular malls, Istinye Park, is named after the neighborhood but is actually located in the neighboring Pınar.

Yeniköy consists of luxury villas on a hillside and a small area of tightly packed old houses near the sea. The latter area, the old village, has a longstanding Greek community, evidenced by its Orthodox churches. Yeniköy has many long-established cafes and bakeries reminiscent of old Istanbul. Former prime minister Tansu Çiller lives in a town-house on the seafront. In recent years Yeniköy has acquired a community of Filipinos, working as domestic help in the big villas.

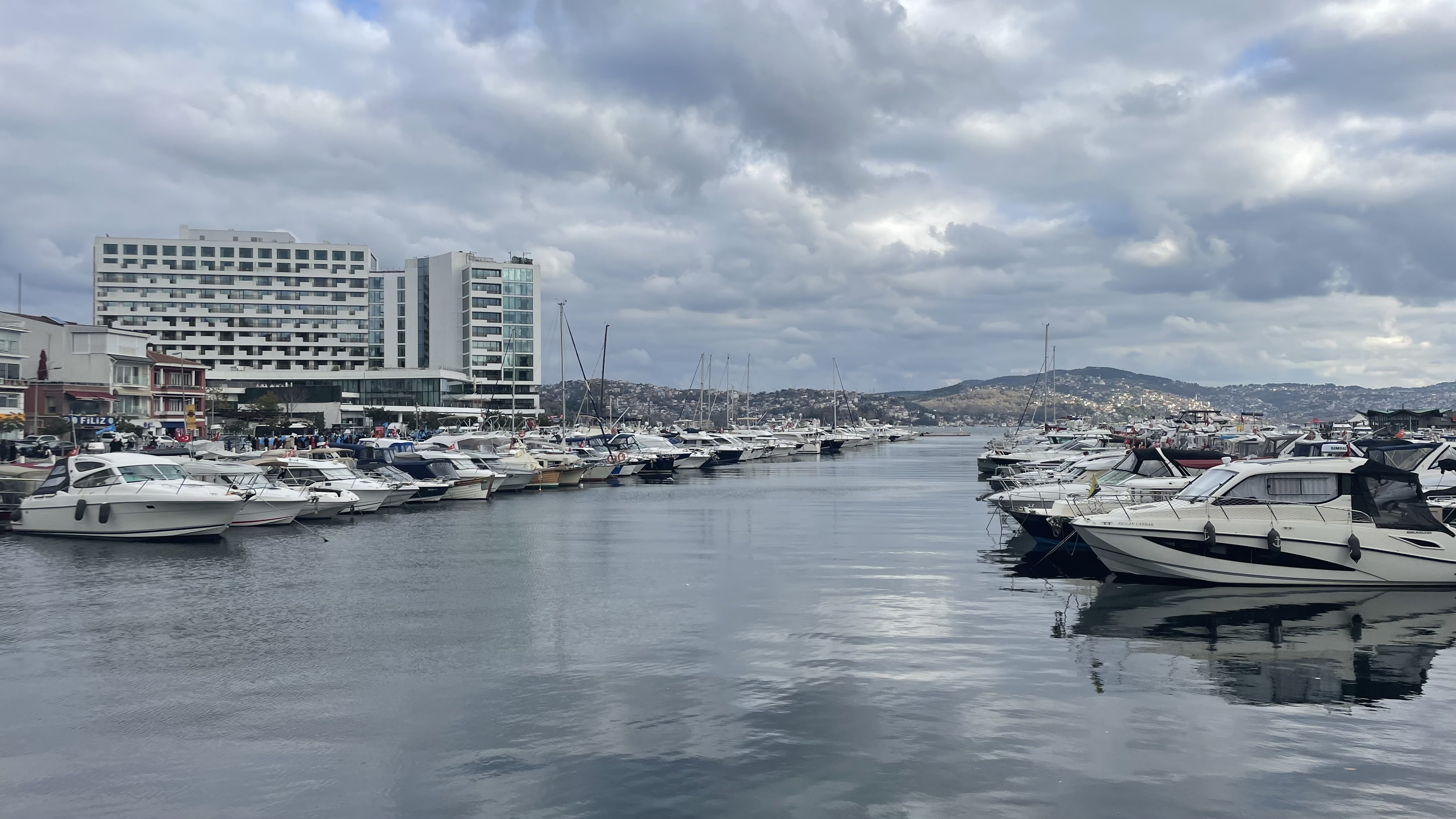
Tarabya Marina

Tarabya was formerly the Greek Theràpia, the name of which comes from the Greek word therapeia (therapy) and indicates the area's former use as a sanctuary from the city for the sick. It is now an affluent neighbourhood, dominated by the once grand Tarabya Hotel. There are fish restaurants and 'taverna' featuring traditional Turkish music, drink, and atmosphere. Marmara University has a small site here, teaching French, housed in a villa built by Alexander Ypsilantis. A stream once flowed to the Bosphorus, but is now covered by concrete. Tarabya also is home to the German consulate.

Büyükdere was formerly the Greek-Byzantine Vathys Kòlpos District, 'the deep gulf' in Greek. It was originally a residential area composed mostly of old, quiet neighborhoods. However, recent years have seen the construction of expensive apartments and condominiums. Home to a number of churches, the Spanish and Russian summer consulates and the Sadberk Hanım Museum. The area is also known for its börek.

Bahçeköy was formerly the Byzantine Petra district. It is one of the northern villages of Sarıyer. After Suleiman the Magnificent came back from Belgrade, he settled the Serbs in the nearby forest, which has since been known as the "Belgrade" Forest (Belgrad Ormanı.) In the 19th century, the village was inside the Belgrad Forest but due to the latter's retreat before development, Bahçeköy now sits on the forest's edge. Atatürk Arboretum is in Bahçeköy.

At one time, the Ottoman military would use the Belgrad Forest for military exercises. Today it is popular for picnics at the weekend, and the road to Kilyos passes through here. The woods are home to Istanbul University's department of forestry, and are accessible by public transport. There have always been rural communities here but since the 1990s, luxury housing and private schools have been built in parts of the forest. The largest of these developments is the new village of Zekeriyaköy, which is now one of the most expensive residential areas in Istanbul. The campus of the Koç University is also located in the forest. The growth of these areas may have, along with construction and poorly conceived traffic flow planning, contributed to the heavy traffic in the village of Sarıyer.

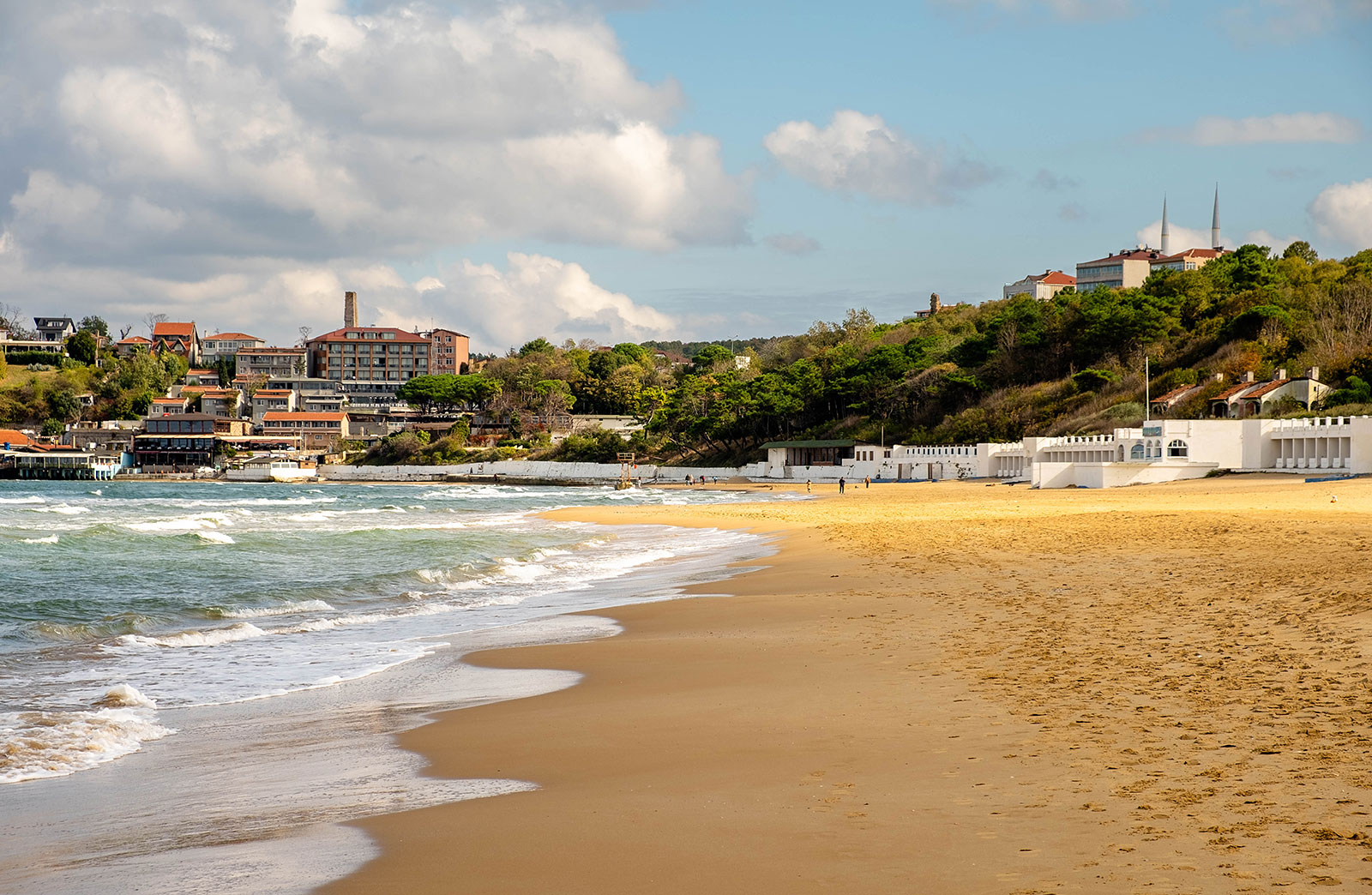
Shores of Kilyos

Kilyos is a small town, a summer retreat from the city, although it is often windswept in winter. Some Istanbul residents swim in the sea at Kilyos, although the rocky coast and strong currents, including, in places, a dangerous undertow, make swimming here risky. The road to Kilyos leads through the Belgrad Forest with its system of viaducts and reservoirs going back to the Ottoman period, although it is also accessible through the village of Sarıyer, leading to serious traffic delays during summer months. In recent years Kilyos has acquired a number of bars and cafés, including a couple of well-known private beach clubs and a rock festival in summer.

== Climate ==
Sarıyer's climate, typical of northern Istanbul, is oceanic (Cfb/Do) according to both Köppen and Trewartha climate classifications, with cool winters and warm summers. Sarıyer's climate is marked by high precipitation (the highest annual precipitation in Istanbul), milder summers and slightly colder winters than most of lowland Istanbul. It is classified as USDA hardiness zone 8b with pockets of 8a, and AHS heat zone 3.

Climate data for Bahçeköy, Istanbul (normals 1981–2010, snowy days 1990-1999)
Month	Jan	Feb	Mar	Apr	May	Jun	Jul	Aug	Sep	Oct	Nov	Dec	Year
Mean daily maximum °C (°F)	7.6 (45.7)	8.3 (46.9)	10.2 (50.4)	16.4 (61.5)	20.6 (69.1)	25.0 (77.0)	26.4 (79.5)	26.6 (79.9)	23.7 (74.7)	19.0 (66.2)	14.2 (57.6)	9.8 (49.6)	17.3 (63.2)
Daily mean °C (°F)	4.6 (40.3)	4.0 (39.2)	5.9 (42.6)	10.3 (50.5)	15.4 (59.7)	19.8 (67.6)	21.5 (70.7)	21.6 (70.9)	18.1 (64.6)	14.1 (57.4)	9.5 (49.1)	6.3 (43.3)	12.6 (54.7)
Mean daily minimum °C (°F)	1.3 (34.3)	1.1 (34.0)	2.5 (36.5)	6.4 (43.5)	10.6 (51.1)	14.7 (58.5)	17.0 (62.6)	17.9 (64.2)	13.9 (57.0)	10.7 (51.3)	6.8 (44.2)	3.4 (38.1)	8.9 (47.9)
Average precipitation mm (inches)	163.7 (6.44)	112.5 (4.43)	101.3 (3.99)	68.3 (2.69)	55.8 (2.20)	47.4 (1.87)	45.3 (1.78)	71.9 (2.83)	79.6 (3.13)	119.0 (4.69)	164.3 (6.47)	188.3 (7.41)	1,217.4 (47.93)
Average precipitation days (≥ 0.1 mm)	15.8	14.2	12.9	10.1	8.3	6.9	5.8	5.9	7.4	12.6	15.4	19.8	135.1
Average snowy days (≥ 0.1 cm)	4.6	5.2	1.7	0.4	0.0	0.0	0.0	0.0	0.0	0.0	0.3	4.0	16.2

== Places of interest ==
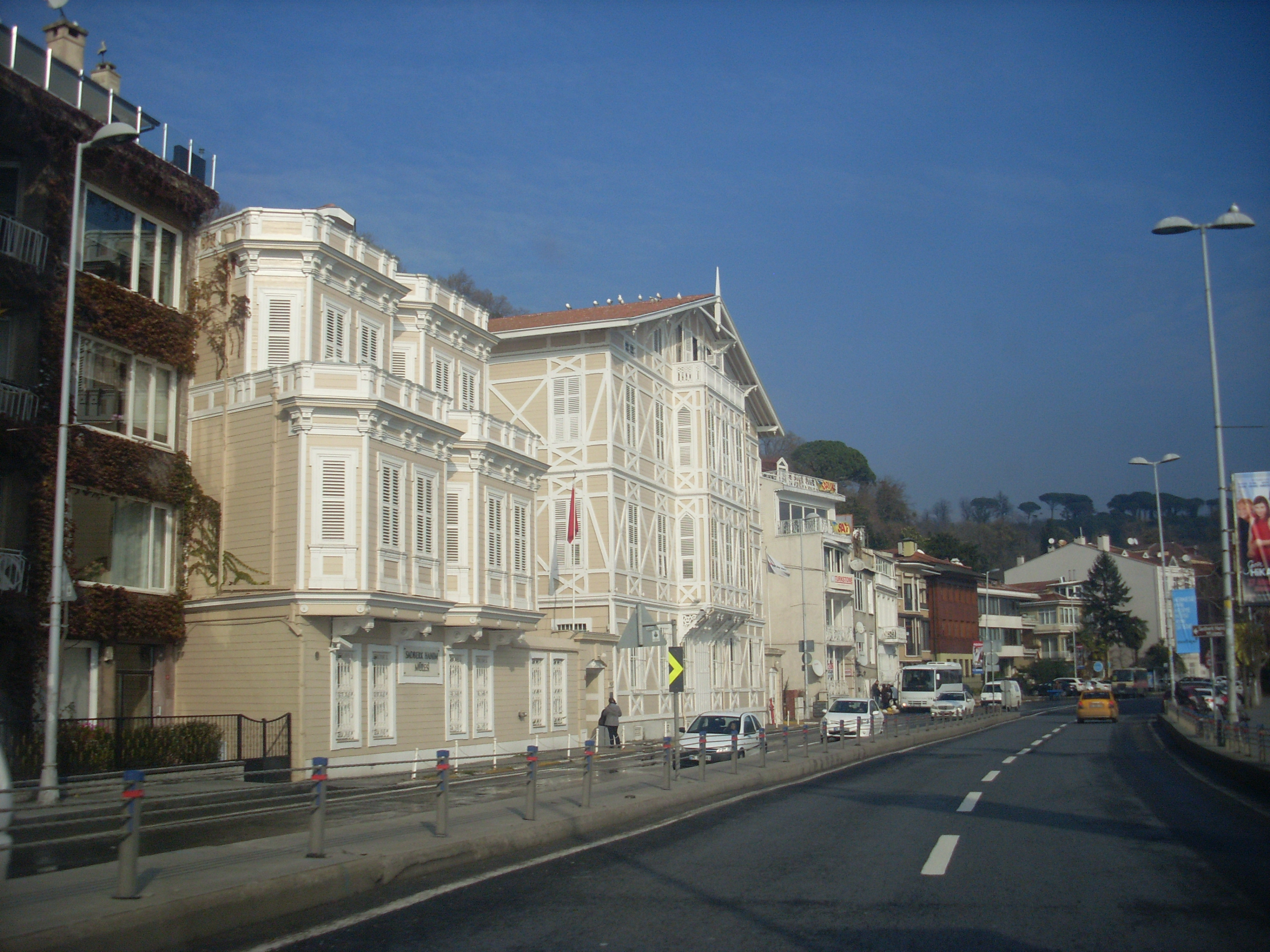
Sadberk Hanım Museum.

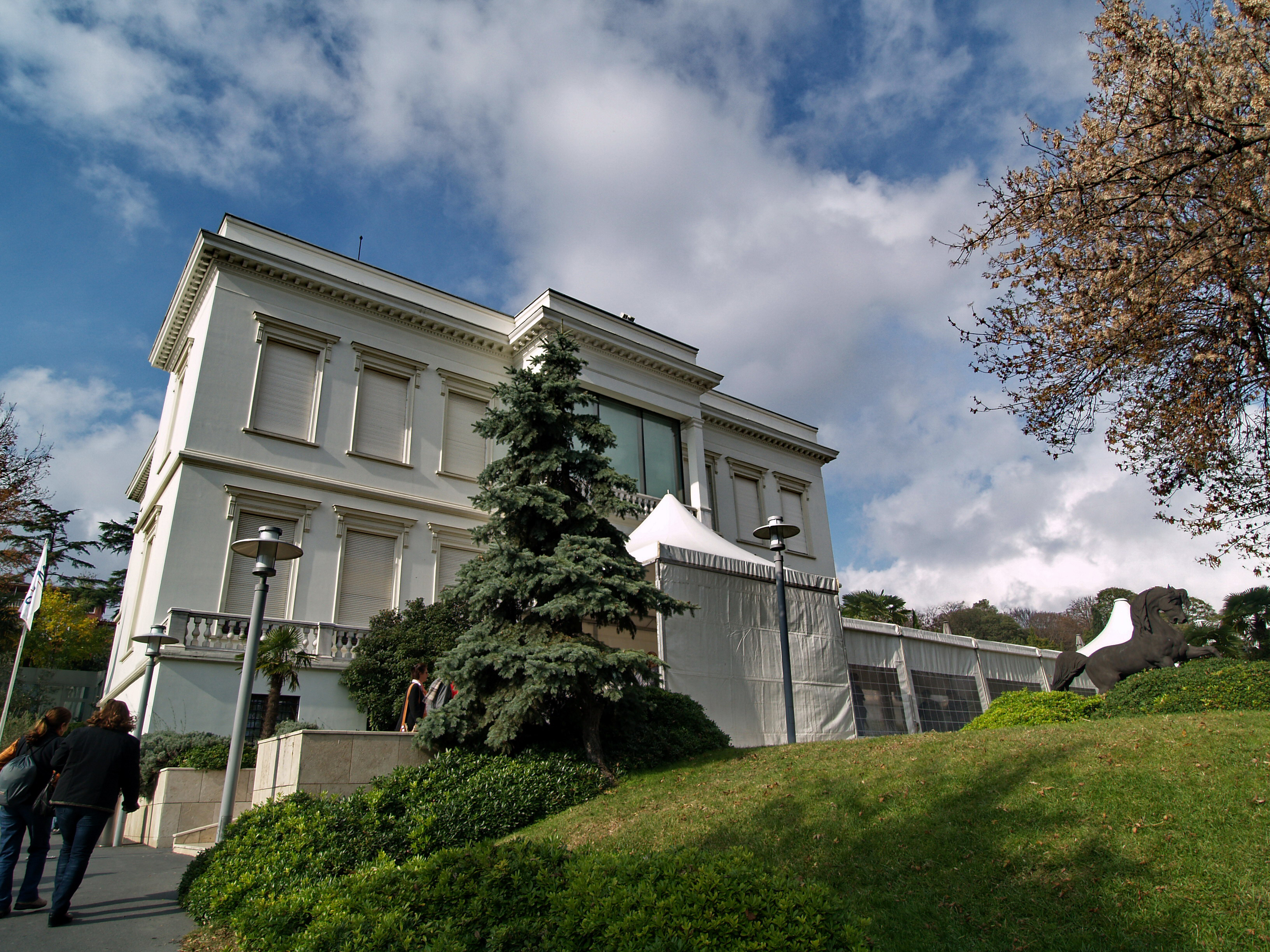
Sakip Sabanci Museum

- Rumelihisarı – the huge fortress on the Bosphorus built during the Ottoman Conquest of Istanbul.
- Sakıp Sabancı Museum
- Sadberk Hanım Museum
- Borusan Contemporary – a museum of contemporary fine arts.
- Rumeli Feneri – a historic lighthouse in the Rumelifeneri village.
- Ottoman era wooden seafront houses (yalı).
- The historic aqueducts of the Belgrad Forest – another important piece of historical architecture in the area.
- İstinye Park, one of the upmarket shopping malls in Istanbul.
- Istanbul Stock Exchange building at İstinye.
- Maslak business district.
- Telli Baba tomb of a Muslim saint
- Vadistanbul shopping centre and business district
- Nature parks:
  - Bentler Nature Park, a nature park with historic dams in Bahçeköy neighborhood,
  - Falih Rıfkı Atay Nature Park, a nature park inside Belgrad Forest,
  - Fatih Sultan Mehmet Nature Park
  - Irmak Nature Park, a nature park inside Belgrad Forest,
  - Kömürcübent Nature Park, a nature park inside Belgrad Forest,
  - Mehmet Akif Ersoy Nature Park, a nature park inside Belgrad Forest,
  - Neşet Suyu Nature Park, a nature park inside Belgrad Forest,
  - Türkmenbaşı Nature Park, a protected area in Çayırbaşı neighborhood.
- Garipçe, Sarıyer, a village on the Bosphorus popular for its fish restaurants.

== Sports ==
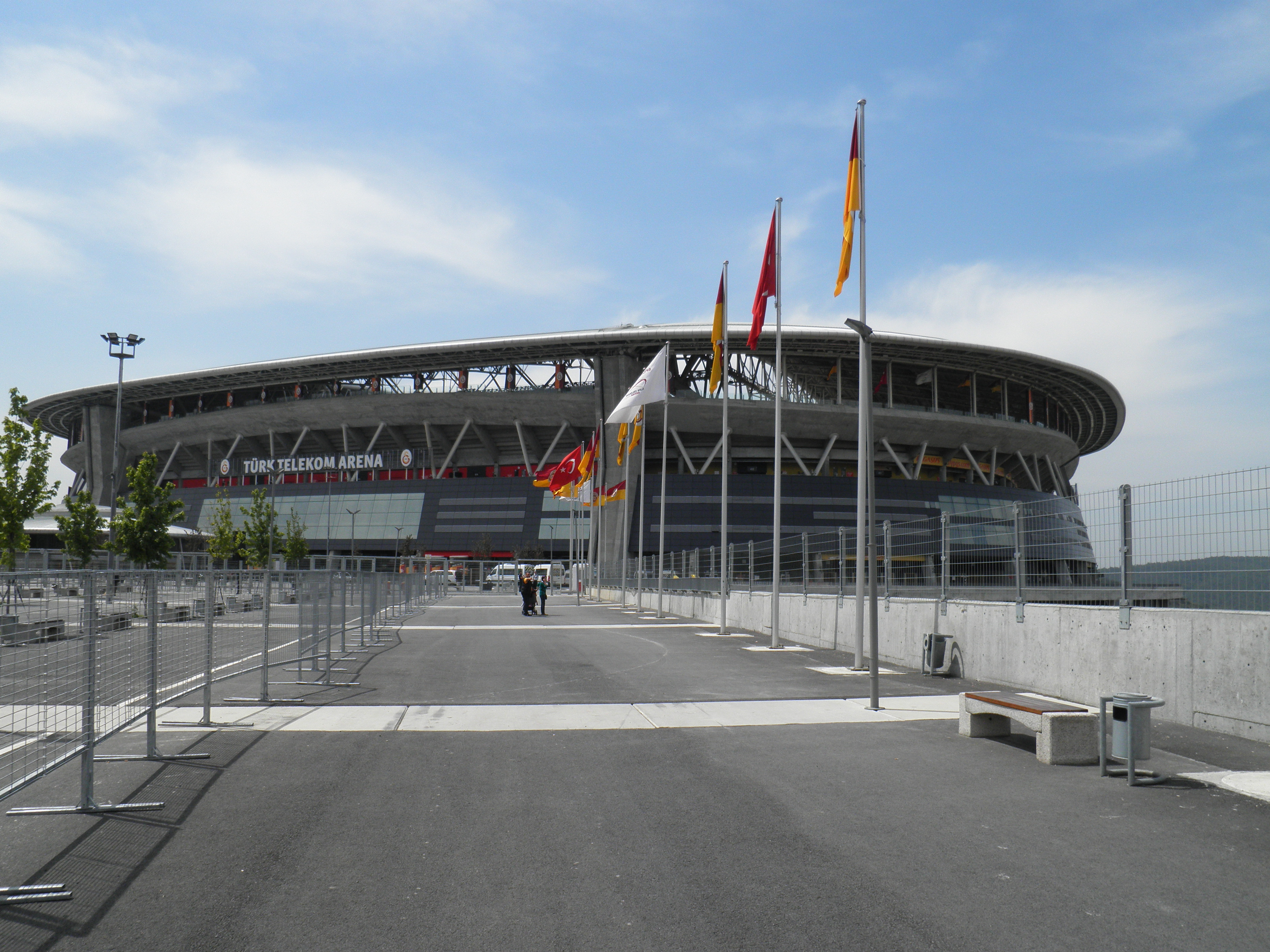
Rams Global Stadium is in Sarıyer

The football club Sarıyer S.K. was the winner of 1992 Balkans Cup winner and played in Süper Lig for 13 seasons. They are currently playing in the TFF First League.

Although Galatasaray S.K. established in 1905 at the Galatasaray High School which is located in Galatasaray district and the club keeps Hasnun Galip Club Administrative Center in Beyoğlu until 2011; Galatasaray S.K. relocated the Club Administrative Center to Rams Global Stadium in 2011, which is in Sarıyer, after the club left their former home ground Ali Sami Yen Stadium.

The women's football club Kireçburnu Spor play in the Turkish Women's First Football League.

The women's volleyball team of Sarıyer Belediyespor compete in the Turkish Women's Volleyball League.

Çayırbaşı Stadium is home to several football clubs in Sarıyer.

== Education ==
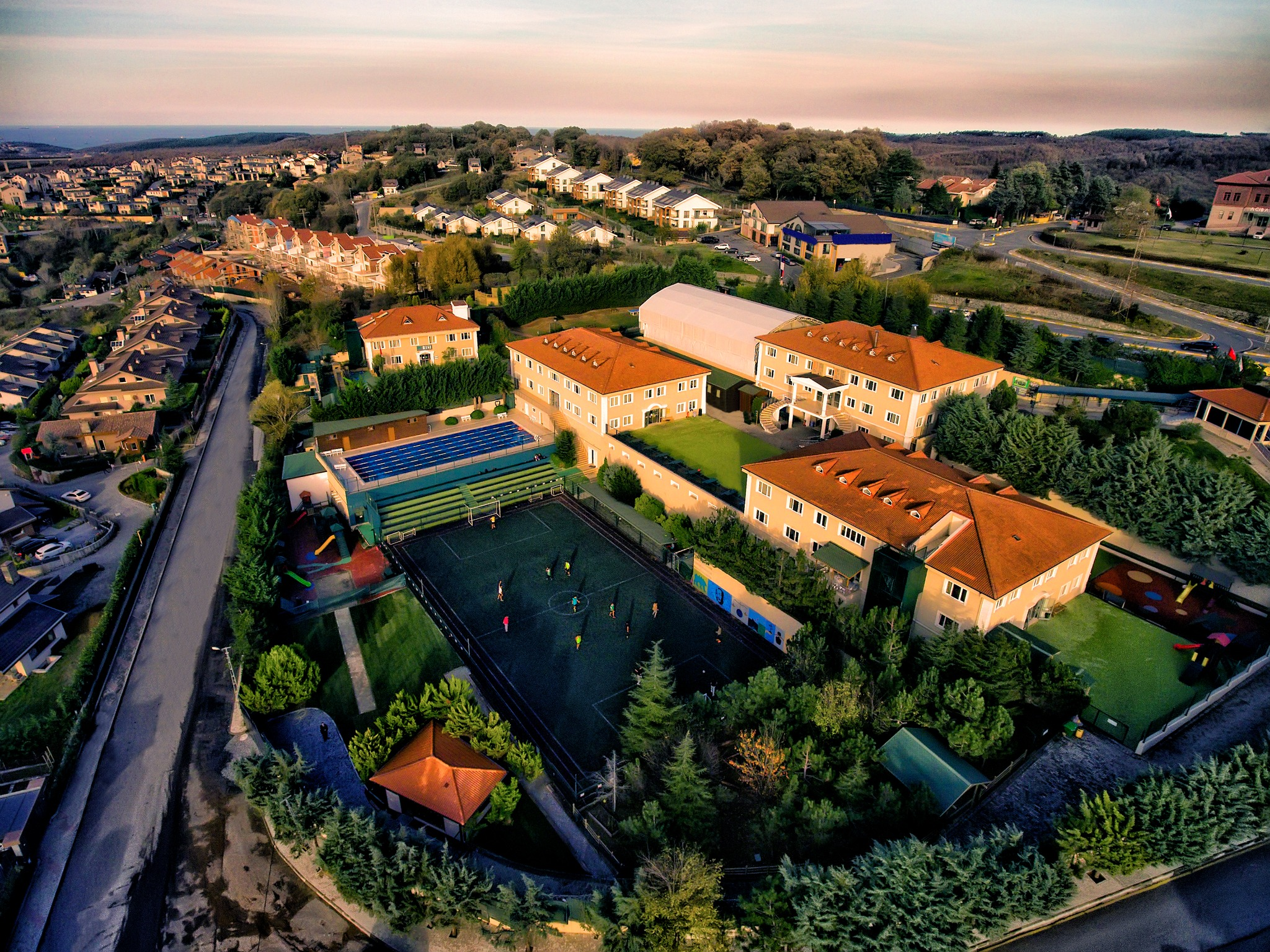
British International School Istanbul Zekeriyaköy Campus in Zekeriyaköy

Primary and secondary schools:

- British International School Istanbul Zekeriyaköy Campus in Zekeriyakoy
- Istanbul International Community School Hisar Campus
- Lycée Français Pierre Loti d'Istanbul Tarabya Campus
- Tarabya British Schools Tarabya and Yeniköy campuses

Universities:

- Beykent University Ayazağa - Maslak Campus
- Istanbul Technical University Ayazaga Campus
- Koç University Main & Batı Campus

== Twin towns ==
Sarıyer is twinned with:

- Aachen, Germany (2013)
- Salisbury, United Kingdom
- (Georgia (country)) Akhalkalaki, Georgia
- Puerto Princesa, Philippines
- Çekmeköy, Turkey
- Vác, Hungary
- Enfield, United Kingdom
- Gönyeli, Northern Cyprus

== See also ==
- Topuzlu Dam, built in 1750
- Valide Dam, built in 1796
- New Dam, built in 1830
