= Uskumruköy =

- Neighbourhood
- Location in Turkey Uskumruköy (Istanbul)
- Coordinates: 41°13′N 29°01′E
- Country: Turkey
- Province: Istanbul
- District: Sarıyer
- Elevation: 75 m (246 ft)
- Population (2022): 9,864
- Time zone: UTC+3 (TRT)
- Postal code: 34450
- Area code: 0212

Uskumruköy (literally mackerel village) is a neighbourhood in the municipality and district of Sarıyer, Istanbul Province, Turkey. Its population is 9,864 (2022). It is situated to the north of Belgrad Forest which is one of the most popular excursion areas of Istanbul citizens. It is 8 km (5 mi) west of Sarıyer centre and a suburb of Greater Istanbul.

Uskumruköy is an old village and the ruins of an observation tower around the village was probably built by Republic of Genoa in the Middle Ages. During Ottoman Empire era the village was a gathering place of the army prior to campaigns to west. The economy of the village used to depend on cattle breeding and woodchopping. But at the present, most of the village area was bought by the construction companies and modern houses for Istanbul residents are being built. According to muhtar there are about 2500 villas in the village area. On the other hand, new European quarters of Istanbul are planned to be built in a vast area which covers Uskumruköy.
