= Atatürk Arboretum =

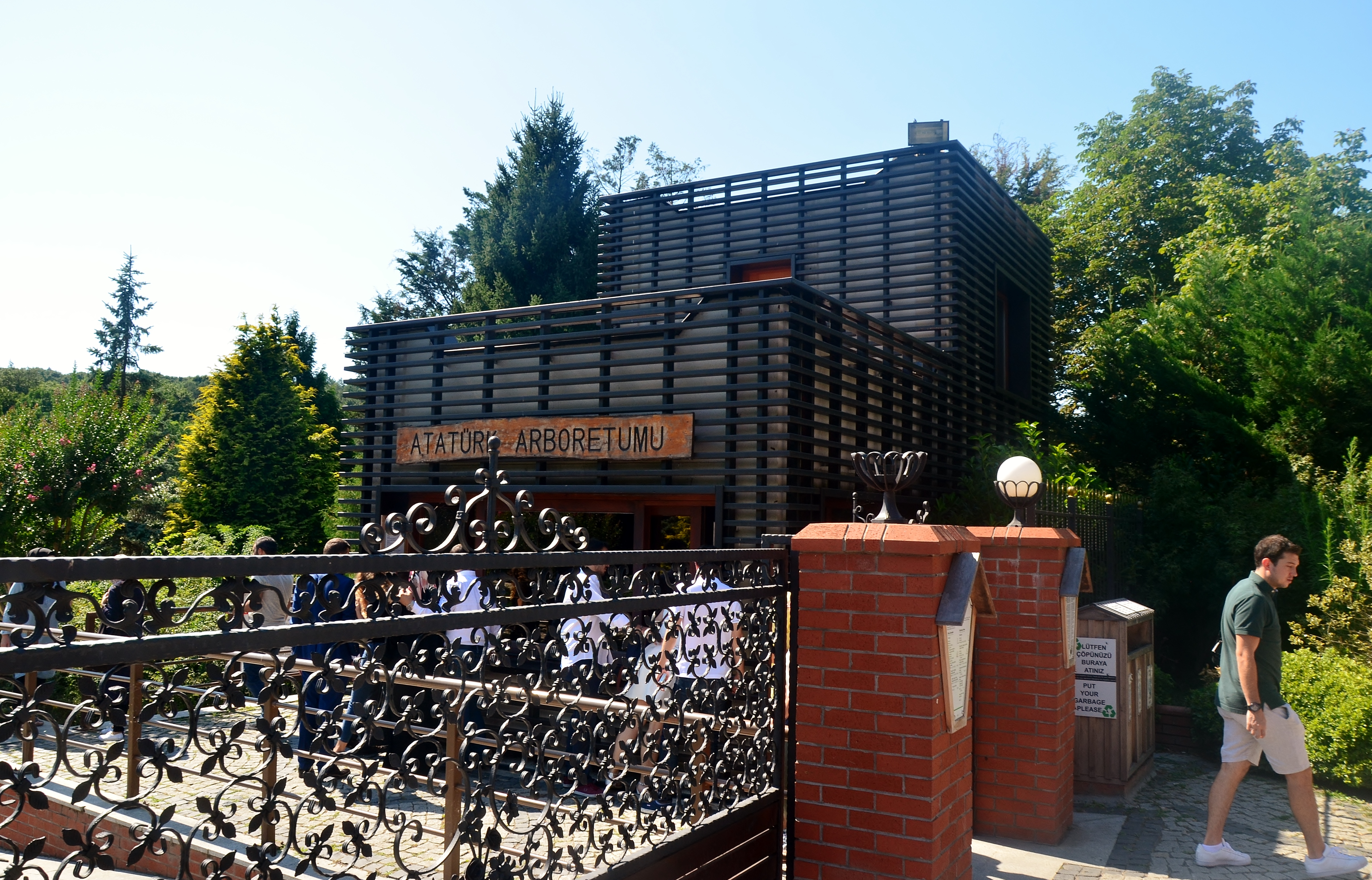
- Entrance of Atatürk Arboretum.

- Location within Istanbul
- Location: Bahçeköy, Sarıyer, Istanbul Province, Türkiye
- Nearest city: Sarıyer
- Coordinates: 41°10′35″N 28°59′06″E
- Area: 296 ha (730 acres)
- Created: July 12, 1982; 44 years ago
- Operator: Istanbul University, Faculty of Forestry

Atatürk Arboretum is an arboretum in Bahçeköy, Sarıyer, Istanbul Province, Türkiye.

The establishment of an arboretum was proposed by Hayrettin Kayacık, professor of the Faculty of Forestry at Istanbul University in 1949. Initially, an area of 38 ha (94 acres) was foreseen for the arboretum. Between 1959 and 1961, Camille Guinet, inspector of the Sorbonne University's botanical garden, planned the road network inside the arboretum. Due to financial shortages, accomplishment of the project took time. Opened on July 12, 1982, it was named in honor of Mustafa Kemal Atatürk (1881–1938), the founder of Turkish Republic, on his 100th birthday anniversary. It is owned and financed by the Directorate General of Forestry, which is also responsible for the administrative operation. Istanbul University's Faculty of Forestry is the scientific partner of the park's executive board.

The main goal of the arboretum is to serve the faculty and the students of Istanbul University's Forestry Department including the relevant agencies of the Ministry of Forest and Water Management, forest engineers, landscape architects, domestic and foreign scientists as well as nature lovers in their research work.

The arboretum covers an area of 296 ha (730 acres) southeast of Belgrad Forest. It contains the 1818-built Kirazlı Dam (Turkish: Kirazlıbent) and a 1916-establıshed plant nursery.

== Gallery ==
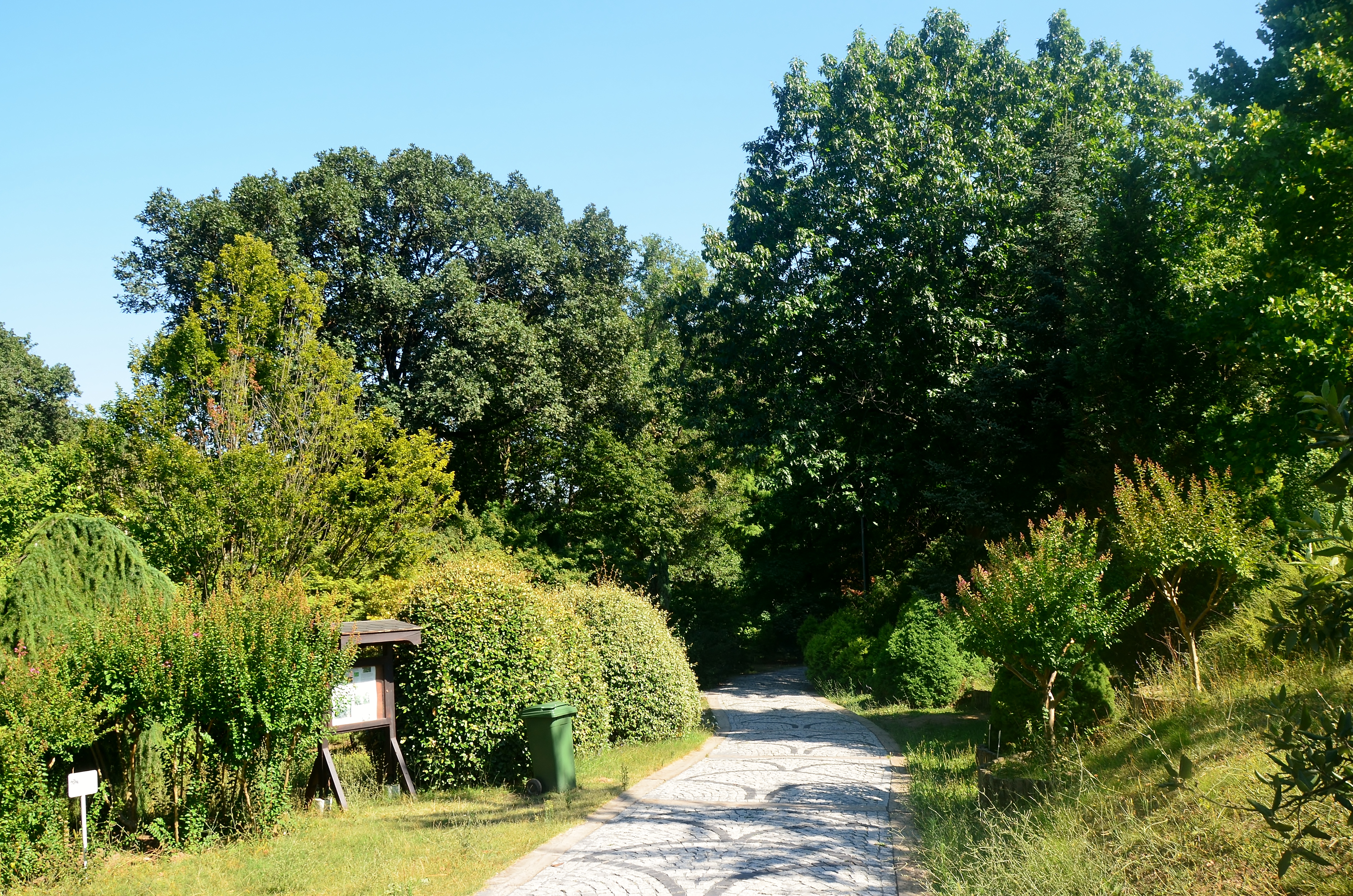
A view of the arboretum.

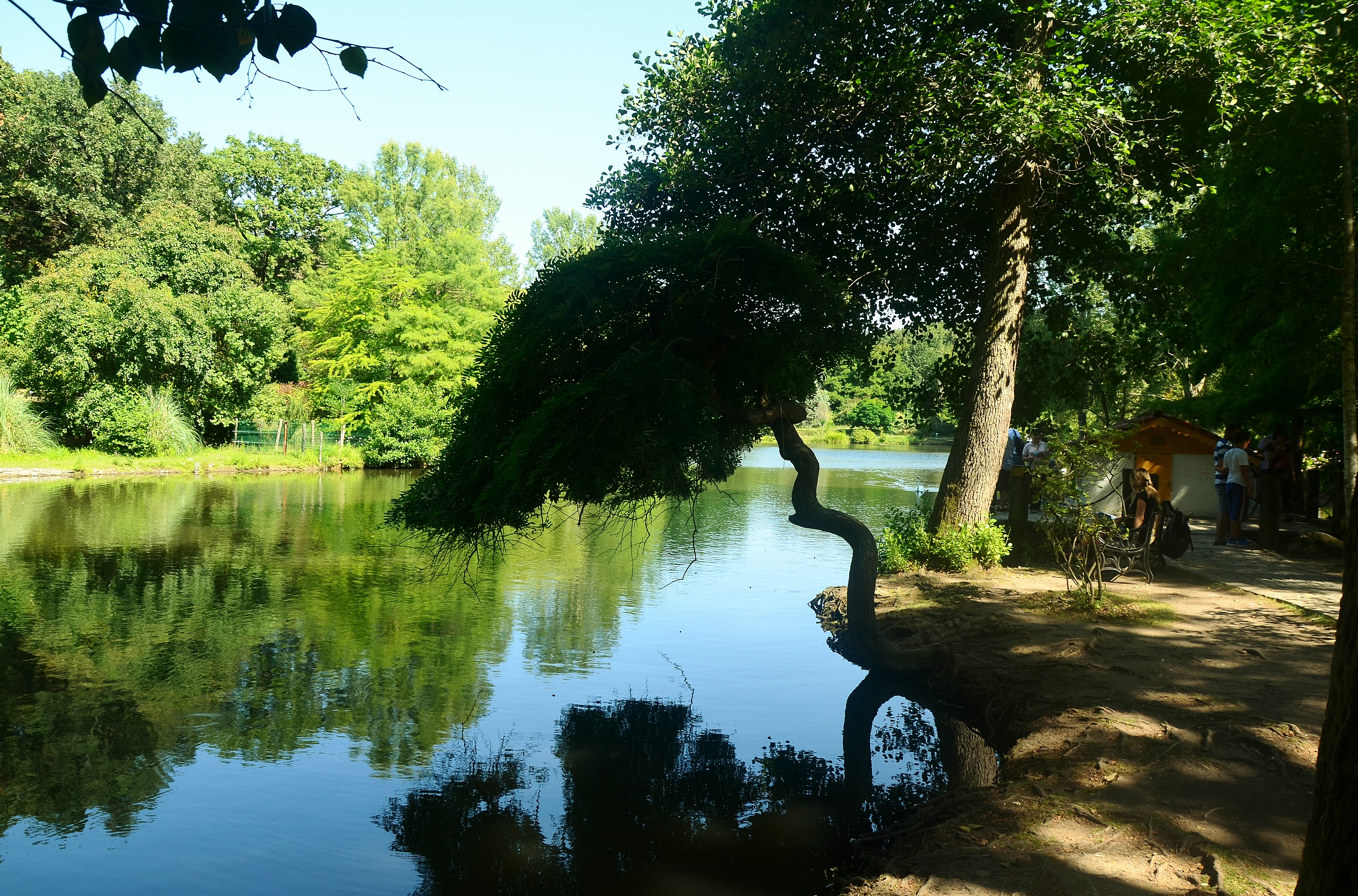
A view of the larger pond.

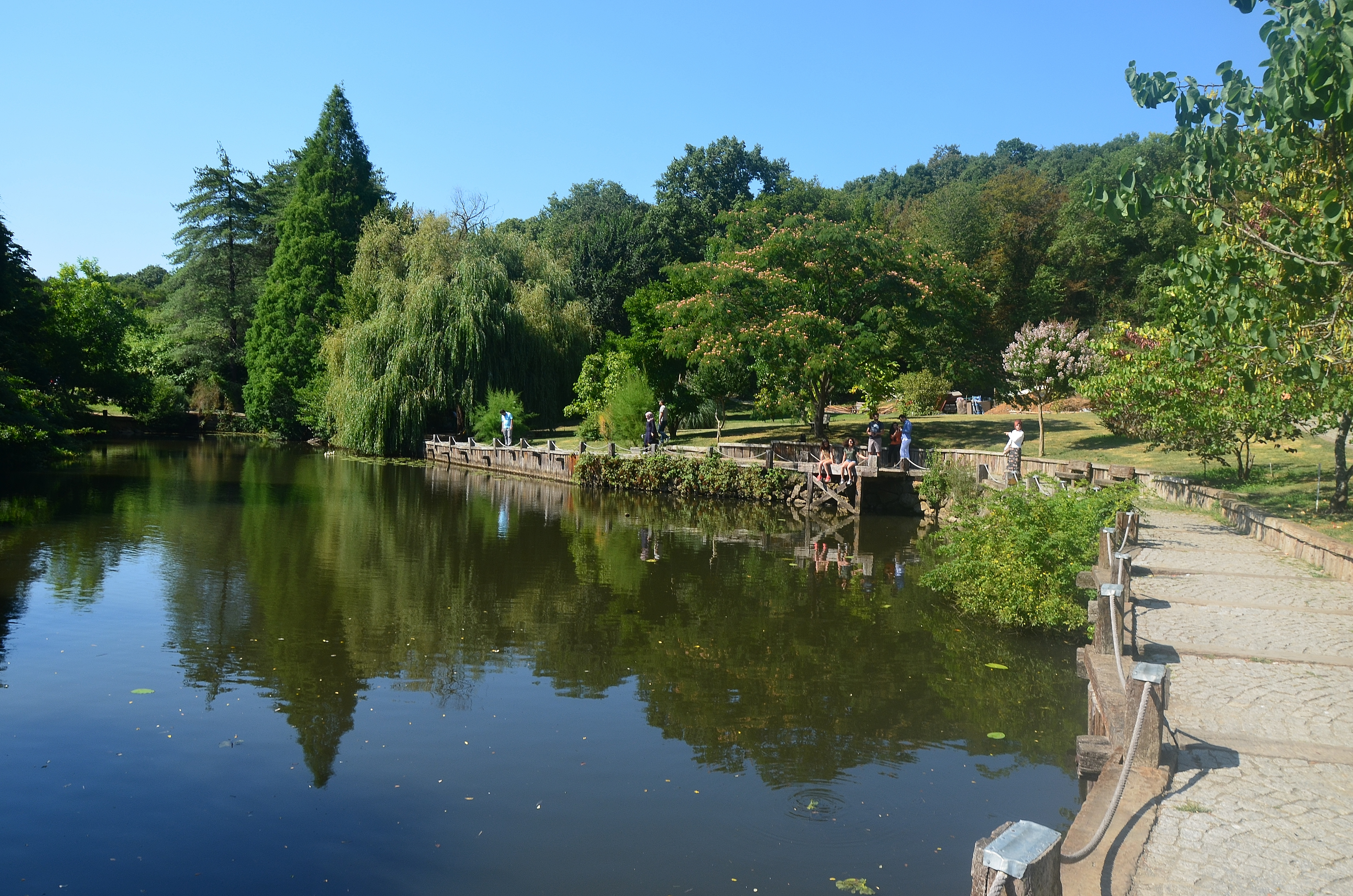
A view of the smaller pond.

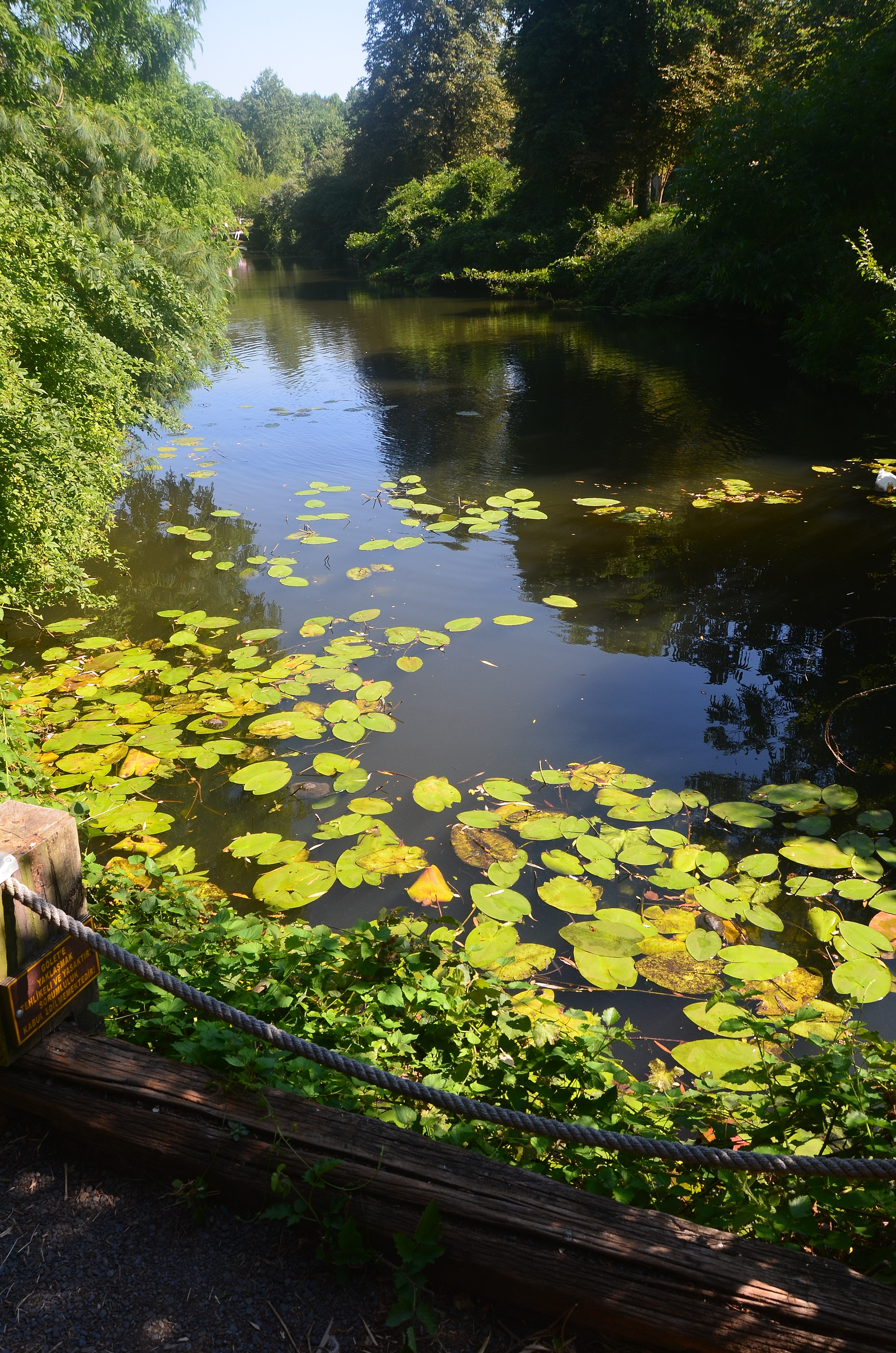
Pond lilies.

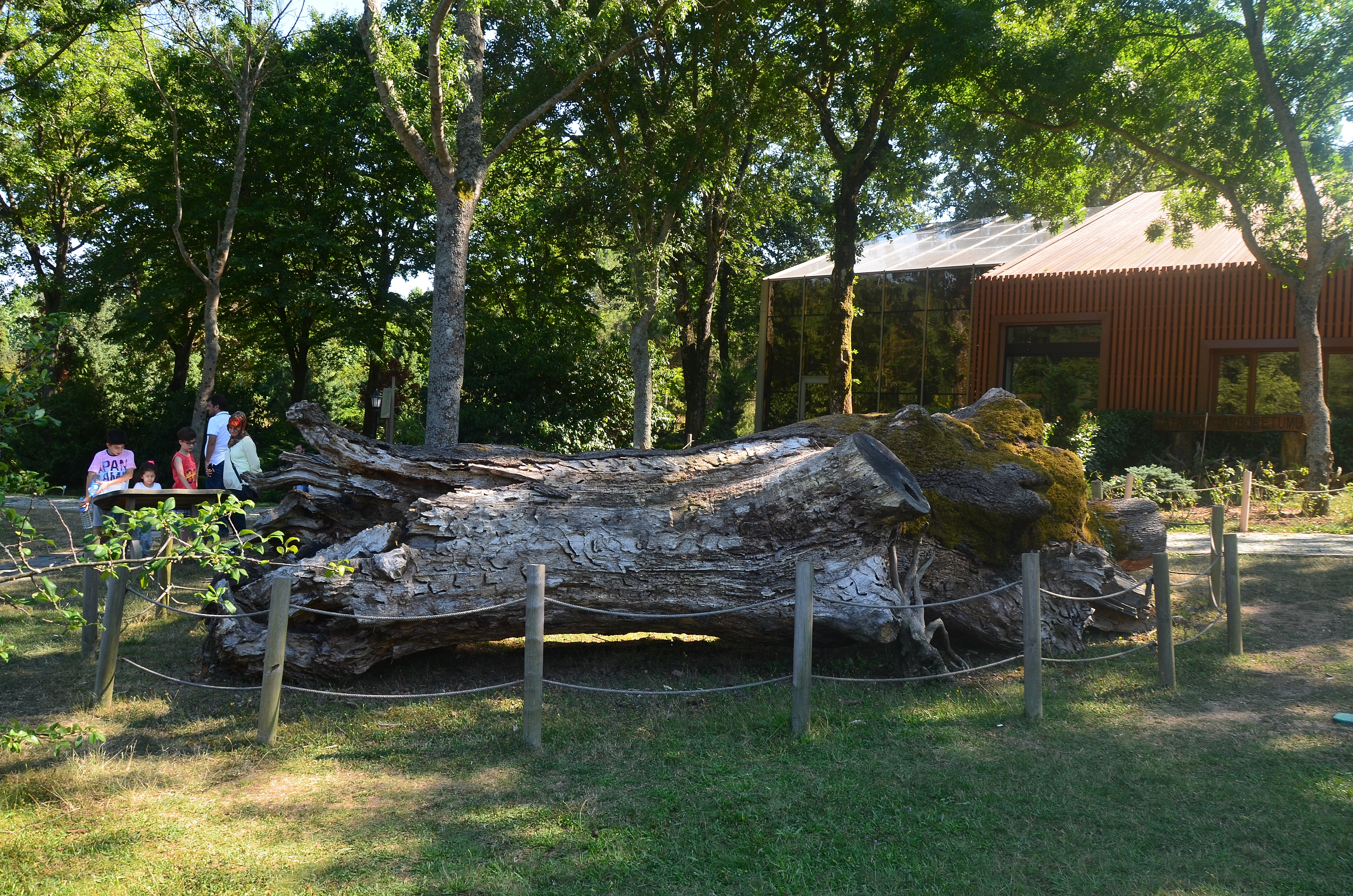
An old big dead oak tree trunk.

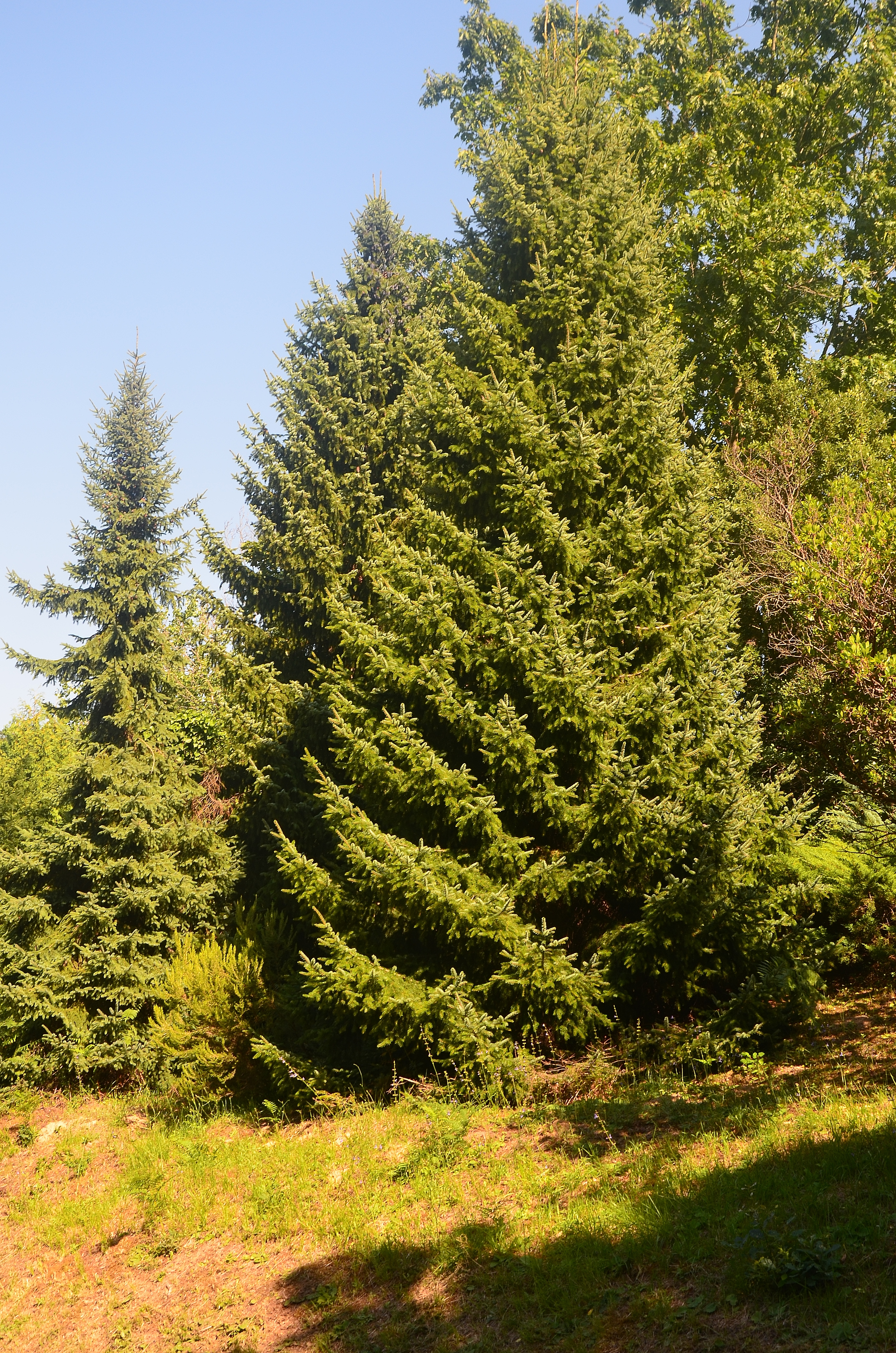
A conifer.

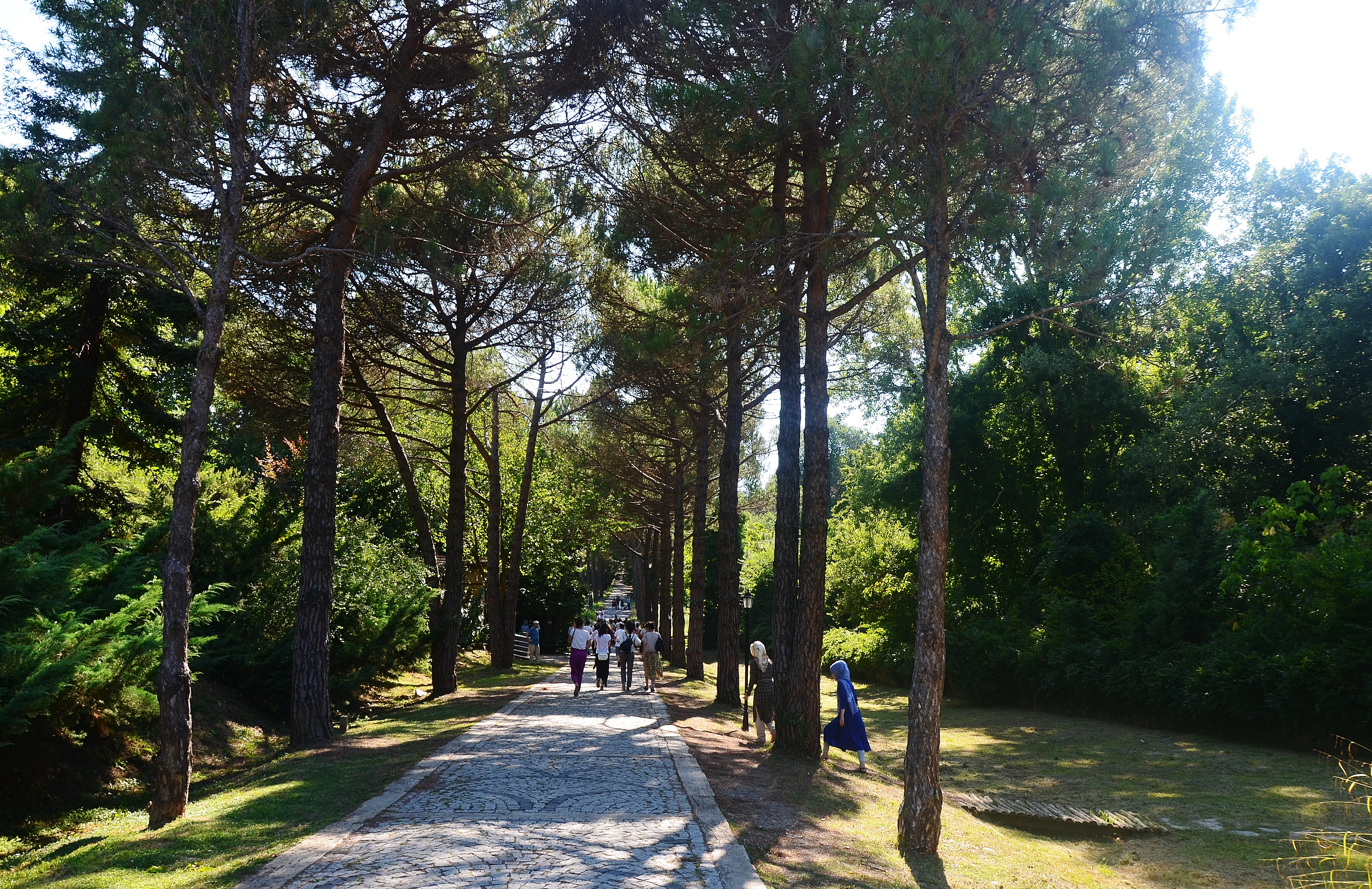
A walkway.

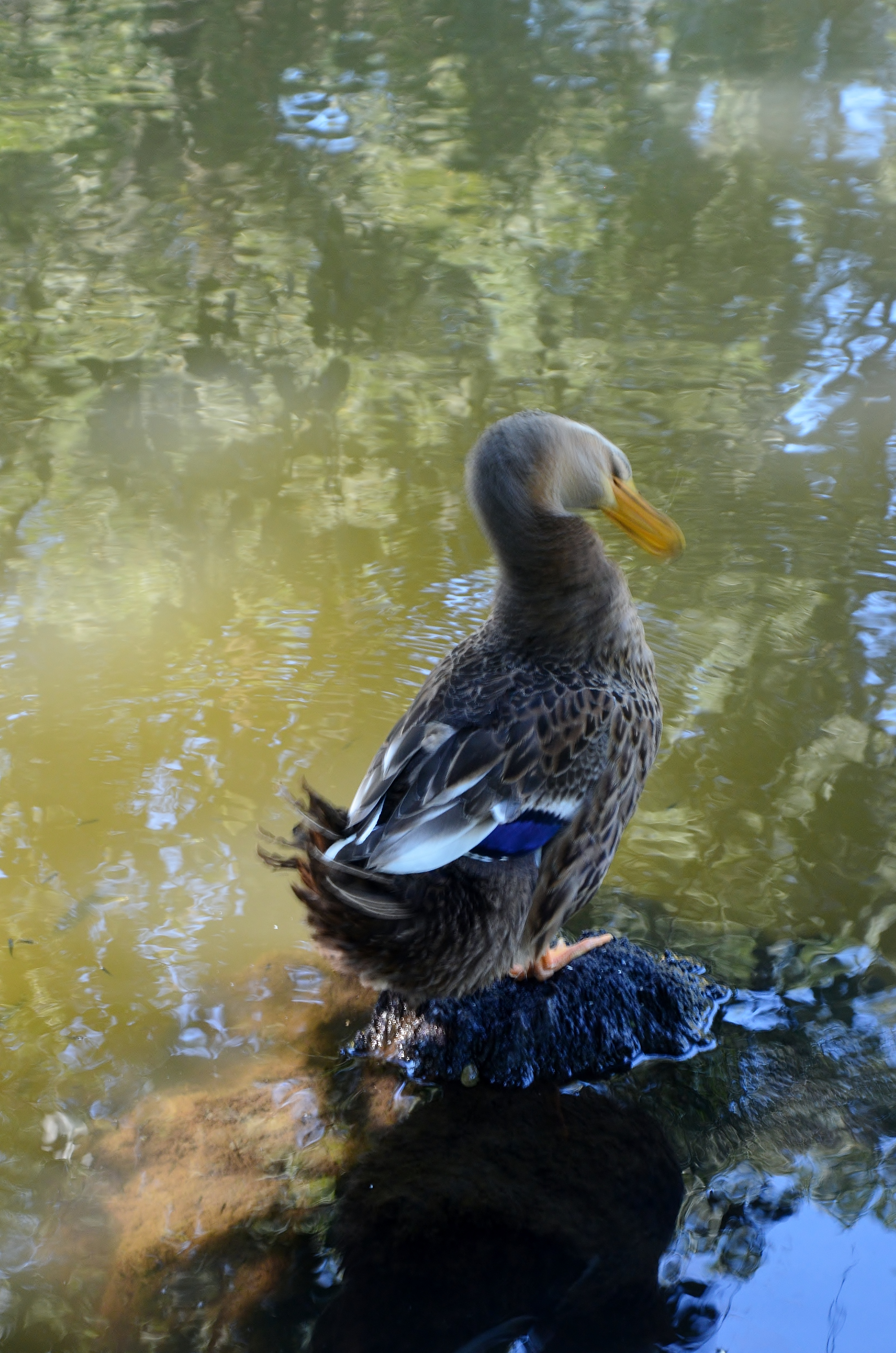
A duck in the larger pond.

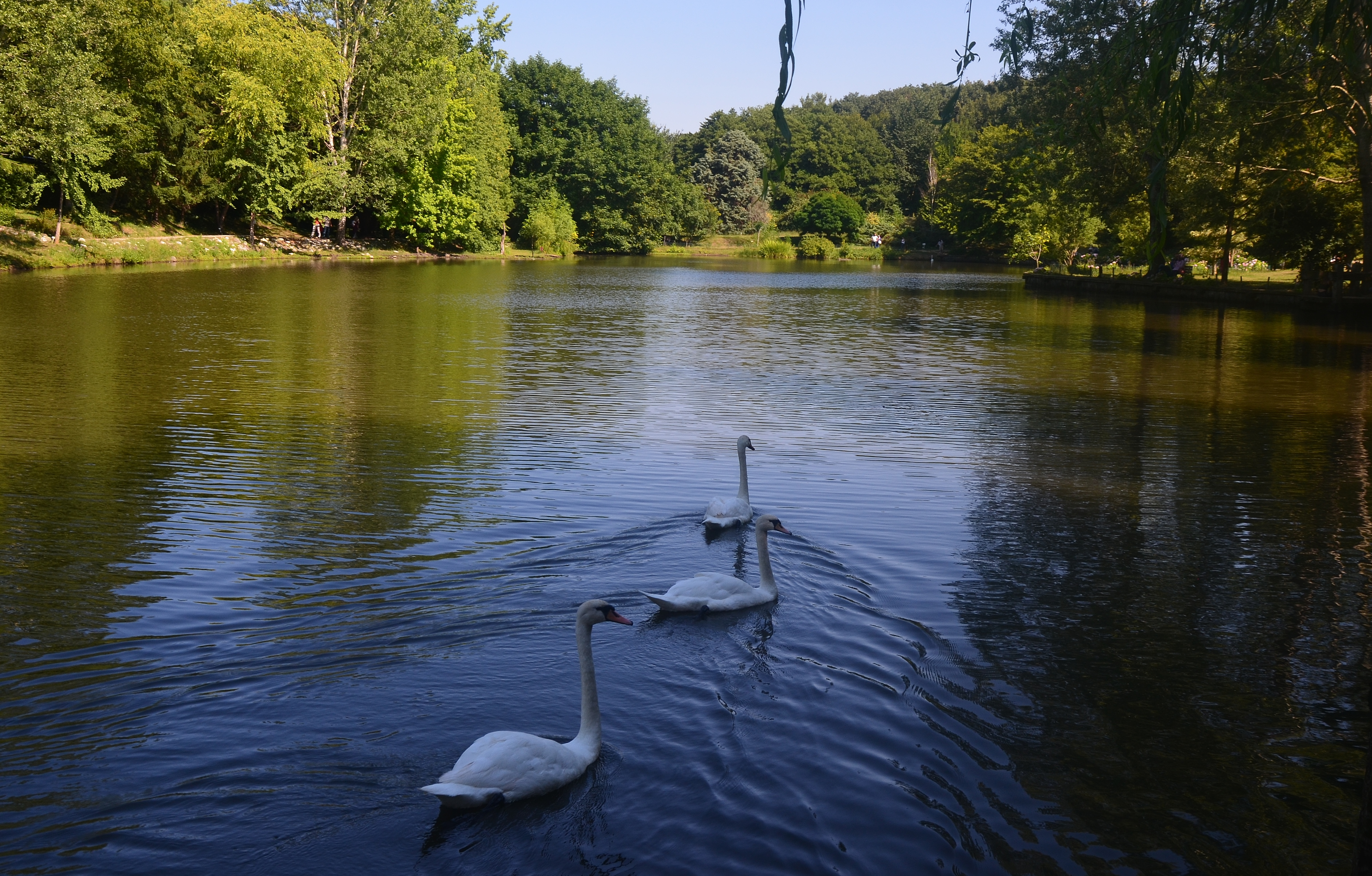
Swans in the larger pond.
