= Zekeriyaköy =

Zekeriyaköy may refer to the following places in Turkey:

- Zekeriyaköy, Ardanuç, a village in the district of Ardanuç, Artvin Province
- Zekeriyaköy, Gölyaka
- Zekeriyaköy, Istanbul, a village in the district of Sarıyer, Istanbul Province
- Zekeriyaköy, Yapraklı
