= Garipçe, Istanbul =

Garipçe
- Neighbourhood
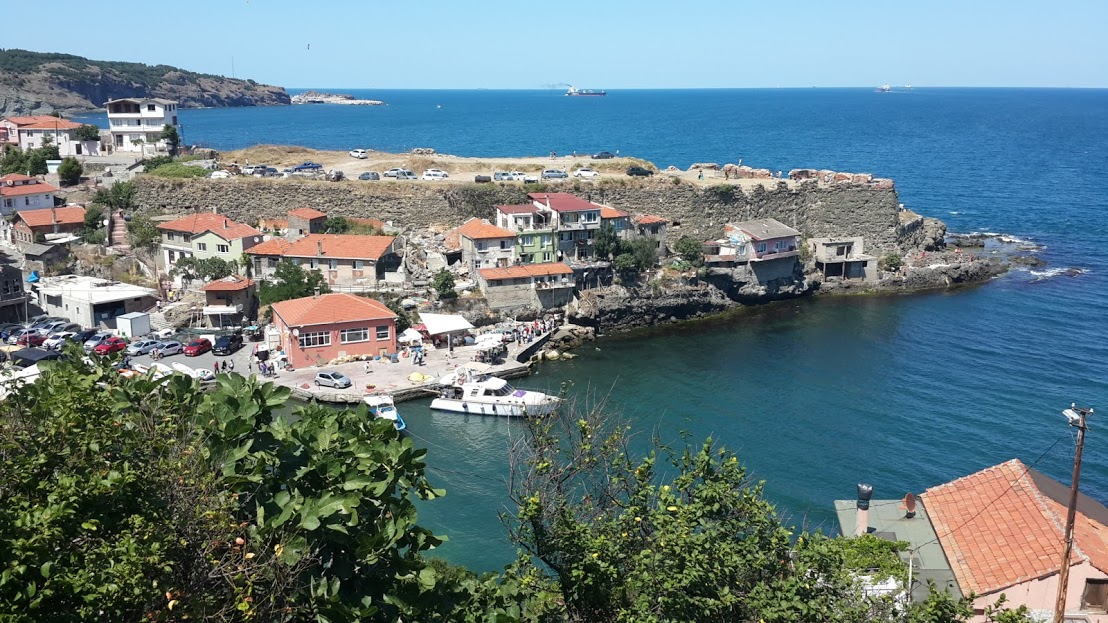

- Location within Turkey Location within Istanbul
- Coordinates: 41°12′51″N 29°06′30″E
- Country: Turkey
- Province: Istanbul
- District: Sarıyer
- Population (2022): 391
- Time zone: UTC+3 (TRT)
- Postal code: 34450
- Area code: 0212

Garipçe is a neighbourhood in the municipality and district of Sarıyer, Istanbul Province, Turkey. Its population is 391 (2022).

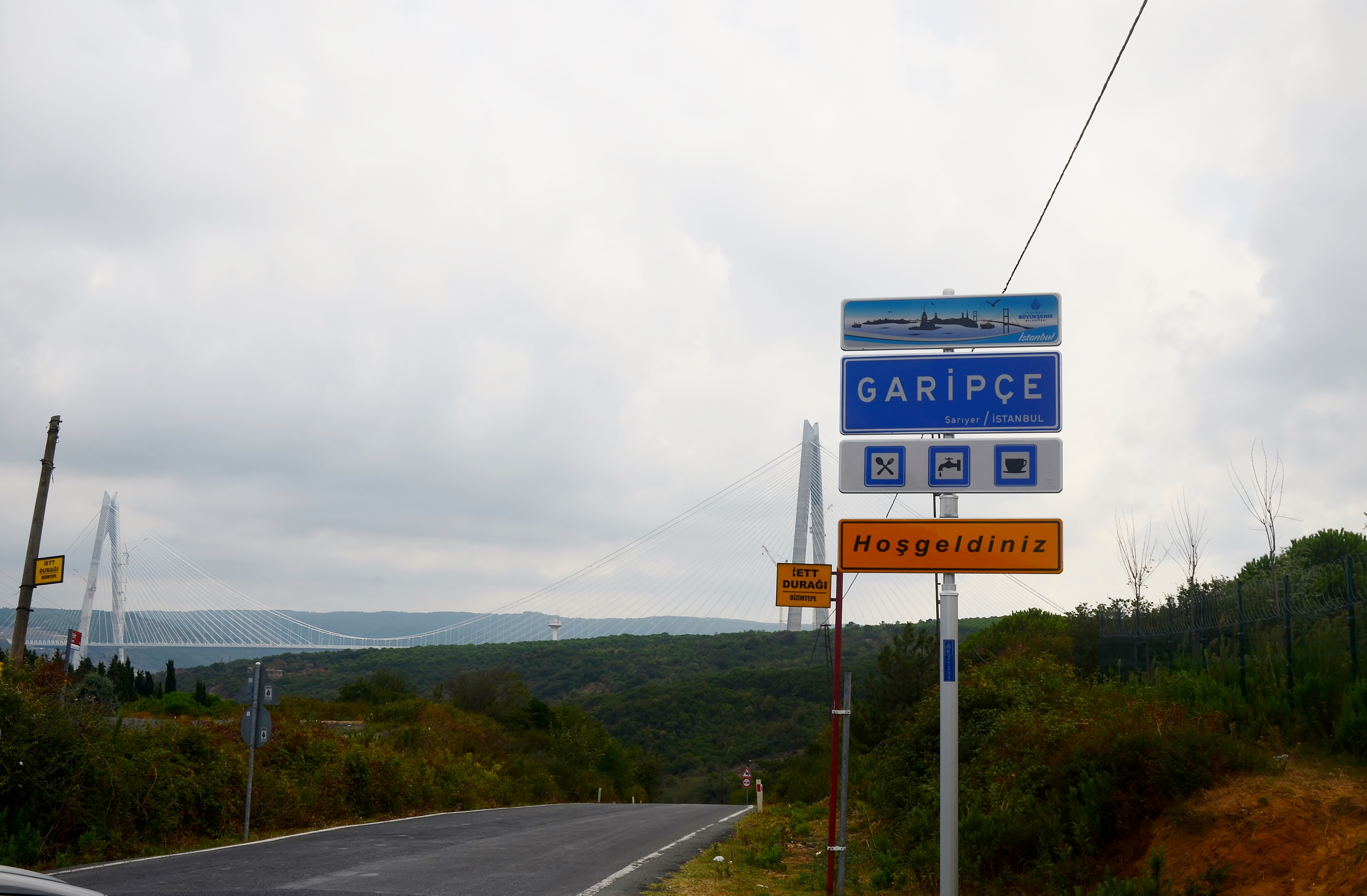
City limit of Garipçe and Yavuz Sultan Selim Bridge in the background.

Garipçe is located on a hillside at the Black Sea entrance of Istanbul Strait, the northernmost place of Bosphorus' European shore, south of Rumelifeneri village. The village Poyrazköy in Beykoz district of Istanbul Province on the Asian shore of Bosphorus is just across Garipçe. It was declared as a protected area for its nature and seascape. The village became popular through the 2016-built Yavuz Sultan Selim Bridge spanning over the Bosphorus between Garipçe and Poyrazköy.

A ruined historic fortress with a tower built by Genoese some 550 years ago is situated on a hill south of the village. The site, covering an area of 9,010 m^{2} (97,000 sq ft), has a panoramic view of Bosphorus.

Garipçe is a fishing community, popular for its fish restaurants. There is no lodging facility in the village.

Line #40 of the city bus İETT, running between Taksim Square and Rumelifeneri, serves Garipçe at late night, and Line 150, running between Hacıosman Bayırı and Rumelifeneri, serves in the day.
