= Topuzlu Dam =

- Location within Istanbul
- Official name: Topuzlu Bent
- Country: Turkey
- Location: Bahçeköy, Sarıyer, Istanbul Province
- Coordinates: 41°10′58″N 28°59′36″E
- Opening date: 1750

Dam and spillways
- Type of dam: Solid gravity dam
- Impounds: Eskibağlar Creek
- Height (thalweg): 14.00 m (45.93 ft)
- Length: 80.65 m (264.6 ft)
- Width (crest): 4.30 m (14.1 ft)
- Width (base): 7.00 m (22.97 ft)

Reservoir
- Total capacity: 160,000 m^{3} (5,700,000 cu ft)
- Catchment area: 0.92 km^{2} (0.36 sq mi)

Topuzlu Dam (Turkish: Topuzlu Bent) is a historic dam located in Sarıyer district of Istanbul Province in Turkey.

Topuzlu Dam was built in 1750 by Ottoman Sultan Mahmud I (reigned 1730–1754). In 1786, its crest was raised about 3.40 m (11.2 ft) higher by Abdul Hamid I (reigned 1774–1789). The dam is named "Topuzlu" meaning "bulged" due to a bulge-formed central part of the upstream wall side.

The dam is situated just north of Bahçeköy, Sarıyer inside the Bentler Nature Park, which is part of the Belgrad Forest.

Topuzlu Dam impounds Eskibağlar Creek and has a catchment area of 0.92 km^{2} (0.36 sq mi). It is a solid gravity dam constructed in masonry. The dam is 14.00 m (45.93 ft) high from the thalweg and 80.65 m (264.6 ft) long at crest. The crest is 4.30 m (14.1 ft) and the base is 7.00 m (22.97 ft) wide. The dam has a reservoir capacity of 160,000 m^{3} (5,700,000 cu ft).
