= Pharmakia =

Town of ancient Thrace

Coordinates: 41°08′00″N 29°03′00″E

Pharmakia or Therapeia (Ancient Greek: Θεραπειά) was a town of ancient Thrace, inhabited during Roman and Byzantine times.

Its site is located near Tarabya in European Turkey.
