= Tarabya =

- Neighbourhood
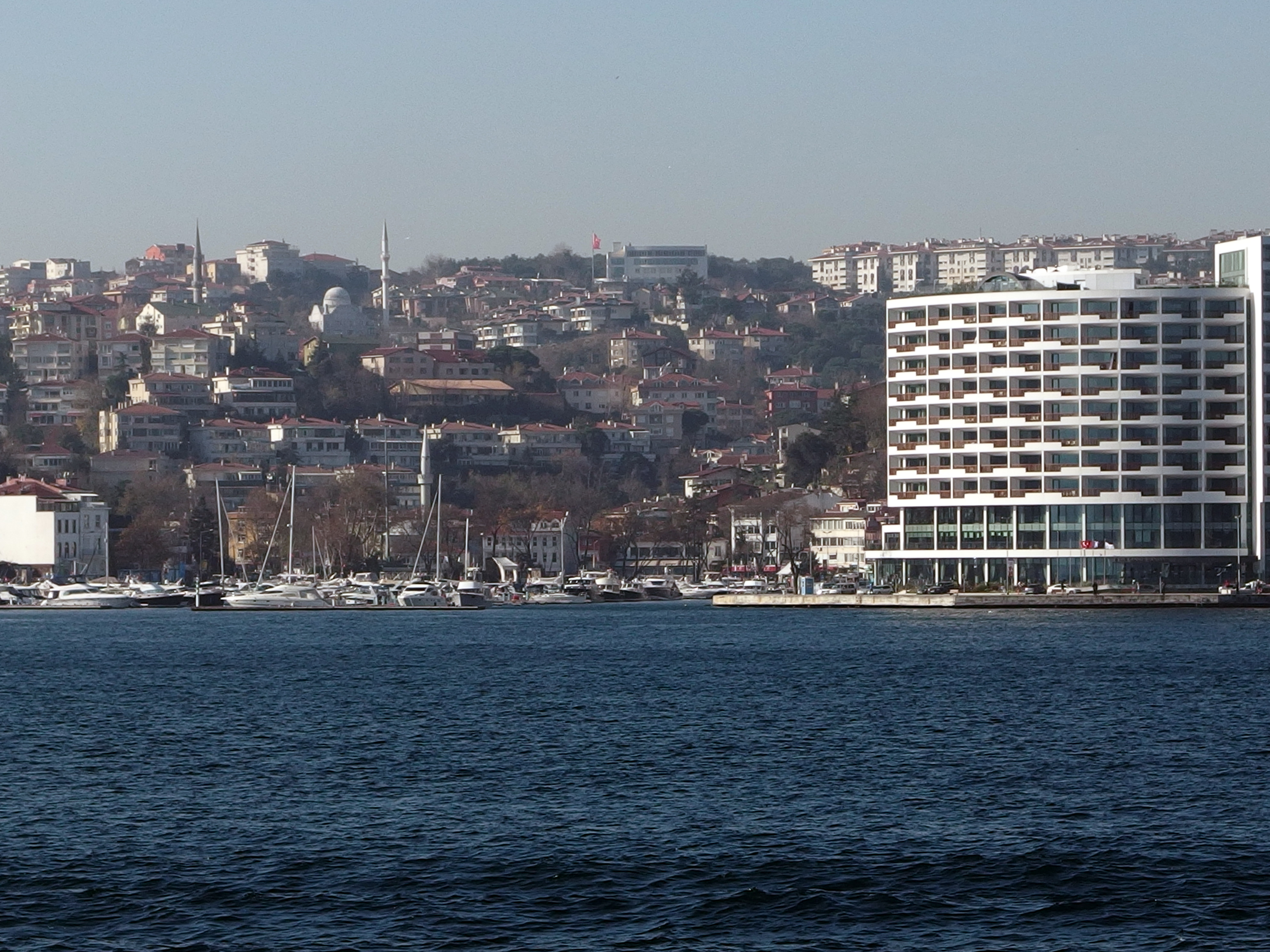

- Location within Turkey Location within Istanbul
- Coordinates: 41°08′N 29°03′E
- Country: Turkey
- Province: Istanbul
- District: Sarıyer
- Population (2022): 17,852
- Time zone: UTC+3 (TRT)

Tarabya (Ottoman Turkish: Tarabiye, Greek: Θεραπειά, romanized: Therapiá) is a neighbourhood in the municipality and district of Sarıyer, Istanbul Province, Turkey. Its population is 17,852 (2022). It is located on the European shoreline of the Bosphorus strait, between the neighbourhoods of Yeniköy and Kireçburnu. It is famous for its coastal fish restaurants. Lycée Français Pierre Loti d'Istanbul and Tarabya British Schools both have high school campuses in Tarabya.

== Geography ==
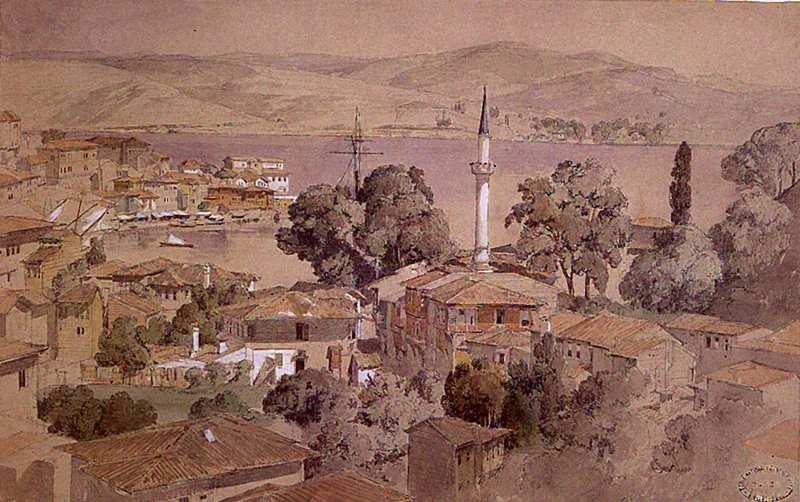
Panorama of the bay and the village of Tarabya

With its greenery, the Huber Mansion and a marina which houses tens of boats and yachts, it is one of the most famous neighborhoods in Istanbul. The last station of the M2 (Istanbul Metro), Hacıosman (Istanbul Metro) is located here, approximately 3 kilometers from the coast.

== History ==
The area used to be called Pharmakia. This name is believed to have been given here by Medea, the names means "poison" in Ancient Greek. According to tradition, Attikos, an Orthodox patriarch was uncomfortable with the name being related to poison, so changed it to "Therapia". Therapia was conquered by the Ottomans in 1453. Then a minor Byzantine castle, it fell during the first few days of the Fall of Constantinople, and 40 Roman soldiers were executed.

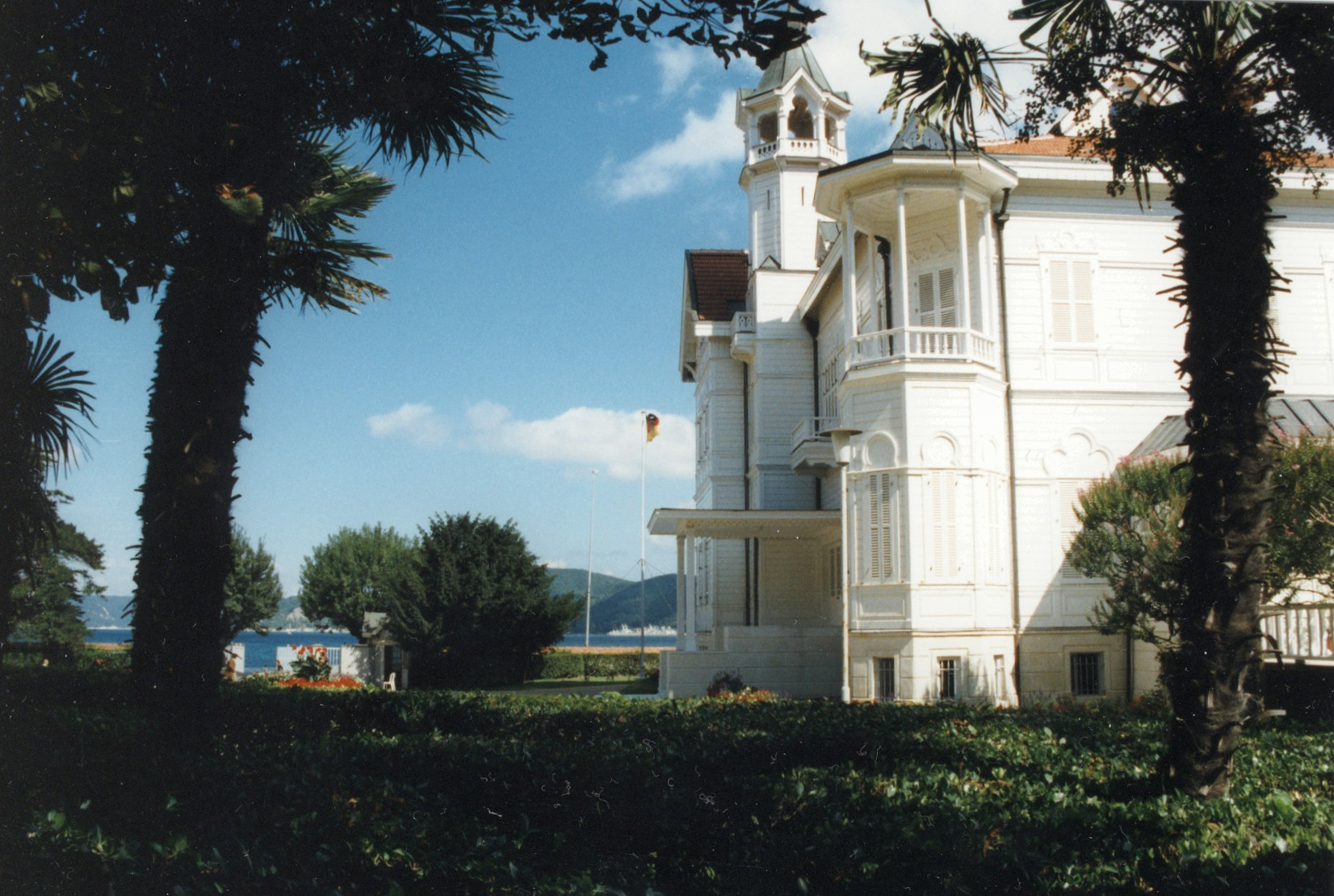
Tarabya, historical summer residence of the German ambassador to the Ottoman Empire

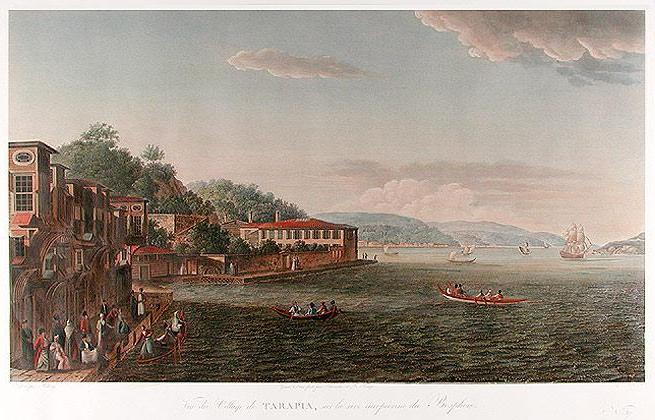
A painting by Antoine Ignace Melling (1763-1831), showing the state of the Ipsilanti Mansion in Tarabya during 1809-1819.

It was noted as a Greek village in the 17th century, but around a hundred years a few Armenians and Muslims also lived there. Over time, it became a tiny fishing village inhabited almost completely by Orthodox Christians. The village became the centre of the Terkos Metropolis in 1655, which transformed the village. Thanks to its new religious position and relative proximity to Constantinople, it became one of the most important settlements on the European side of the Bosphorus. Due to its great climate and safety from diseases such as Cholera, many members of the Greek aristocracy moved their place of residence here. Many foreign embassies and merchants also started to move here, and became the favourite place of the ruling Greek elite. Some Greek families kept their property here until the Greek war of Independence in 1821, after which they were confiscated. The town remained mostly Greek until around the middle of the 20th century. During the Istanbul pogrom, a church built in 1796 and the metropolitan residence was put to fire. During the following years, due to the worsening Turkish-Greek relations and the invasion of Cyprus, most Greeks were forced to move out. The Greek school was closed down in 1985. Around this time, around 50 Greeks -mostly elderly- lived in Tarabya.

== Sights ==
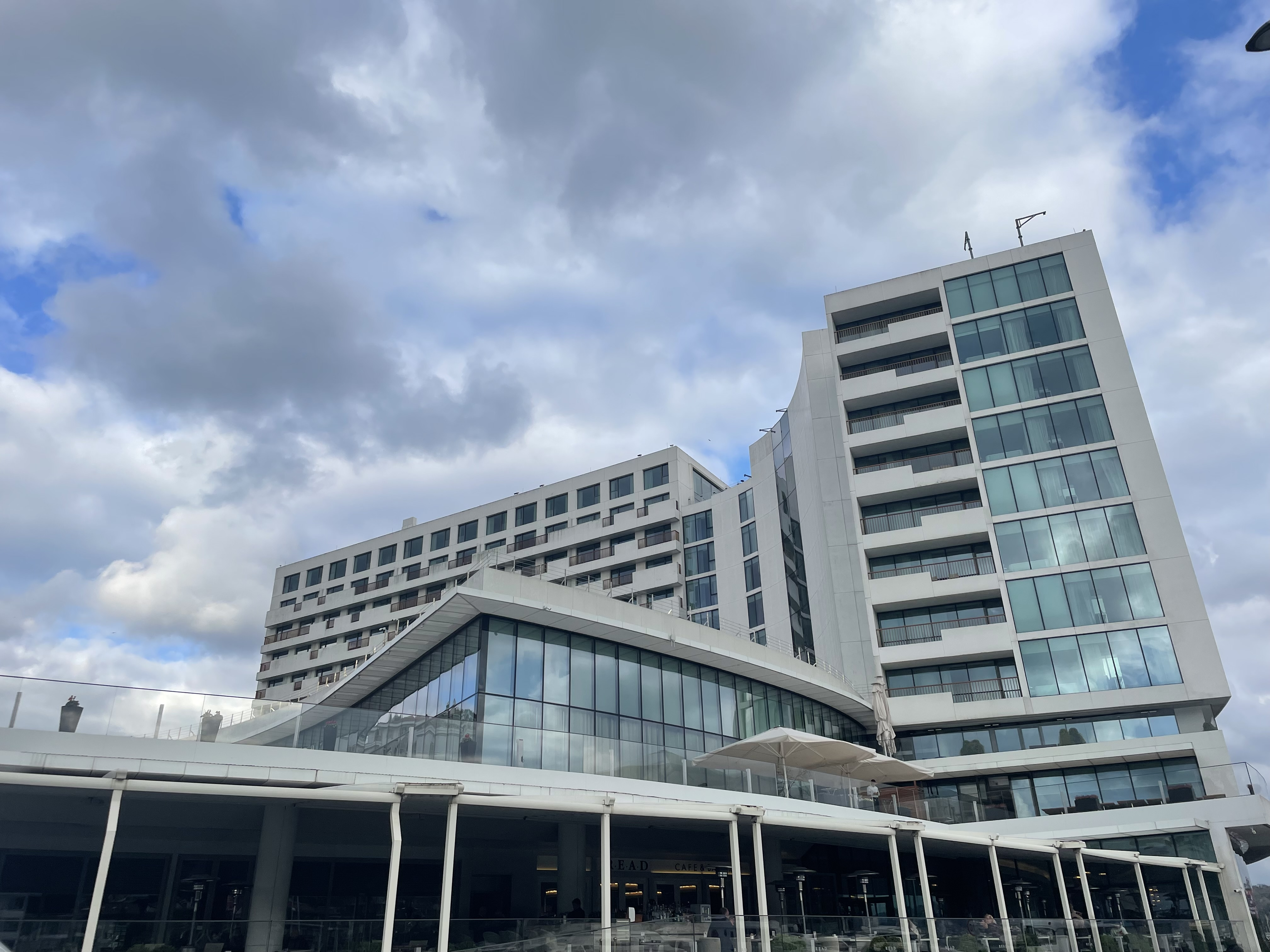
Tarabya Hotel

Tarabya has many historical buildings. Churches, hotels, foreign palaces and fountains, their history dates all the way back to the 17th century. The former residence of the Metropolitan used to be right next where the Grand Tarabya Hotel is located now. A former popular hotel, Sümer Palas, built in the 1890s was demolished in the 1950s, and a new apartment complex with the same name lies there now. Hotel d'Angleterre was also built here during the Crimean War. Later in its place was built the Tokatlıyan Hotel, which got burned down in 1954. The Grand Tarabya Hotel, built in its place is the only current hotel in the neighborhood, which opened in 1966. The two notable parks are: Atsushi Miyazaki Park and Şalcıkır park. Atsushi Miyazaki Park is dedicated to a Japanese volunteer in the 2011 Van Earthquake. Şalcıkır park is a minor park built next to the Tarabya stream. It has a children's area, basketball court and a few fitness machines. The main historical mosque is the Köstenceli Hacı Osman Mosque. The two main historical fountains are the Bezm-i Alem Valide Sultan fountain and the Sultan Mahmud II fountain. Three holy wells were also present here, two of which still exist, they are: Aya Marina, Aya Ioannis and Aya Kiriaki, which is currently in the Atsushi Miyazaki Park.

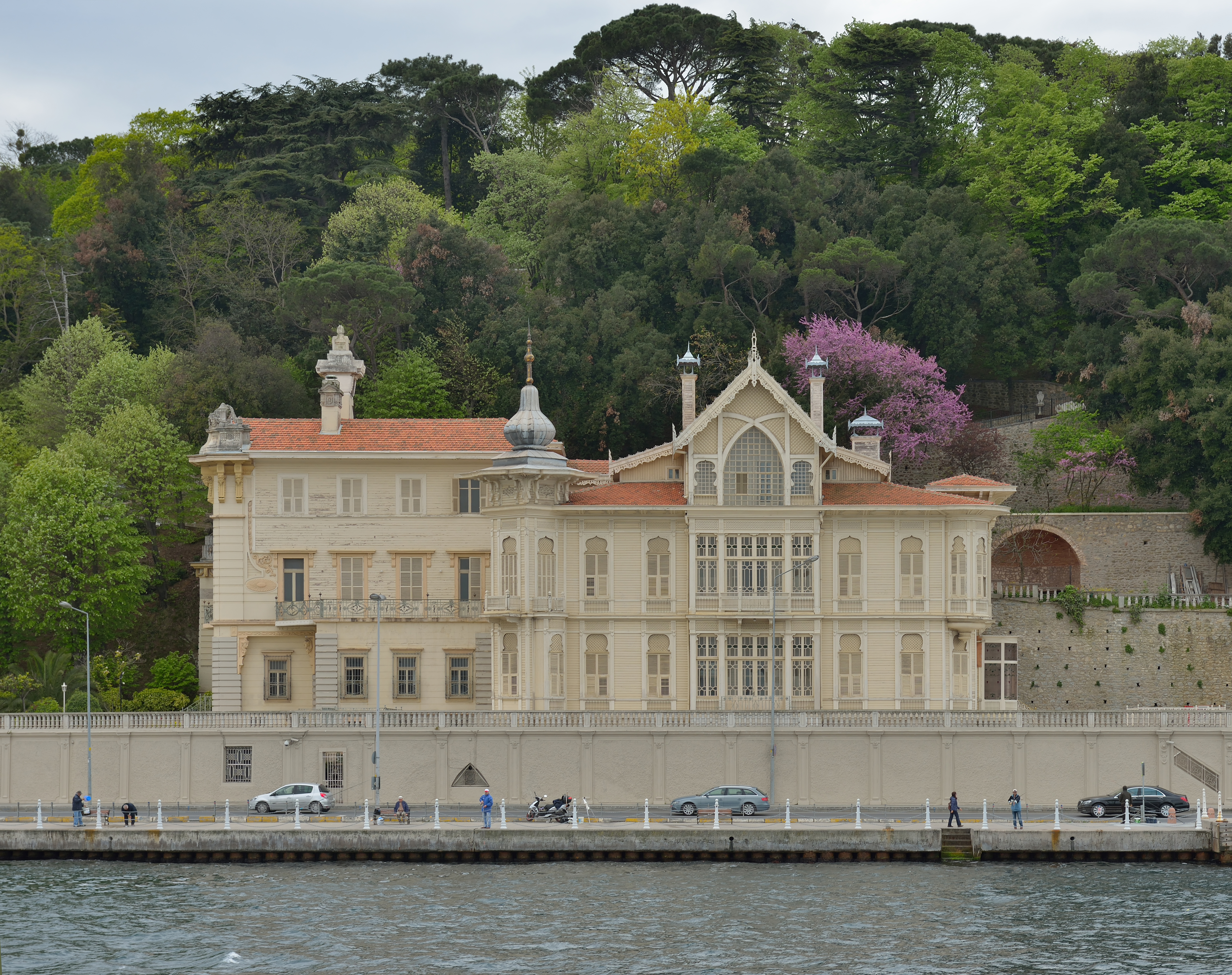
Huber Mansion

Some notable sights include:

- Church of Aya Paraskevi
- Fountain of Sultan Mahmud II
- Fountain of Bezm-i Alem Valide Sultan
- Tarabya Cultural Academy, former summer residence of the German Embassy
- Huber Mansion (currently used as the Presidential residence in Istanbul)
- Yalı of Hristaki Zoğrafos
- Yalı of Prince Ypsilantis (later summer residence of the French Embassy)
- Grand Tarabya Hotel (built on the former site of the historic Tokatlıyan Tarabya Hotel)
- Surp Andon Armenian church
- Köstenceli Hacı Osman Mosque

== Districts ==
- Hacıosman
- Ferahevler
- Kalender
- Aydınevler
- Şenevler
- Ömertepe
