= Valide Dam =

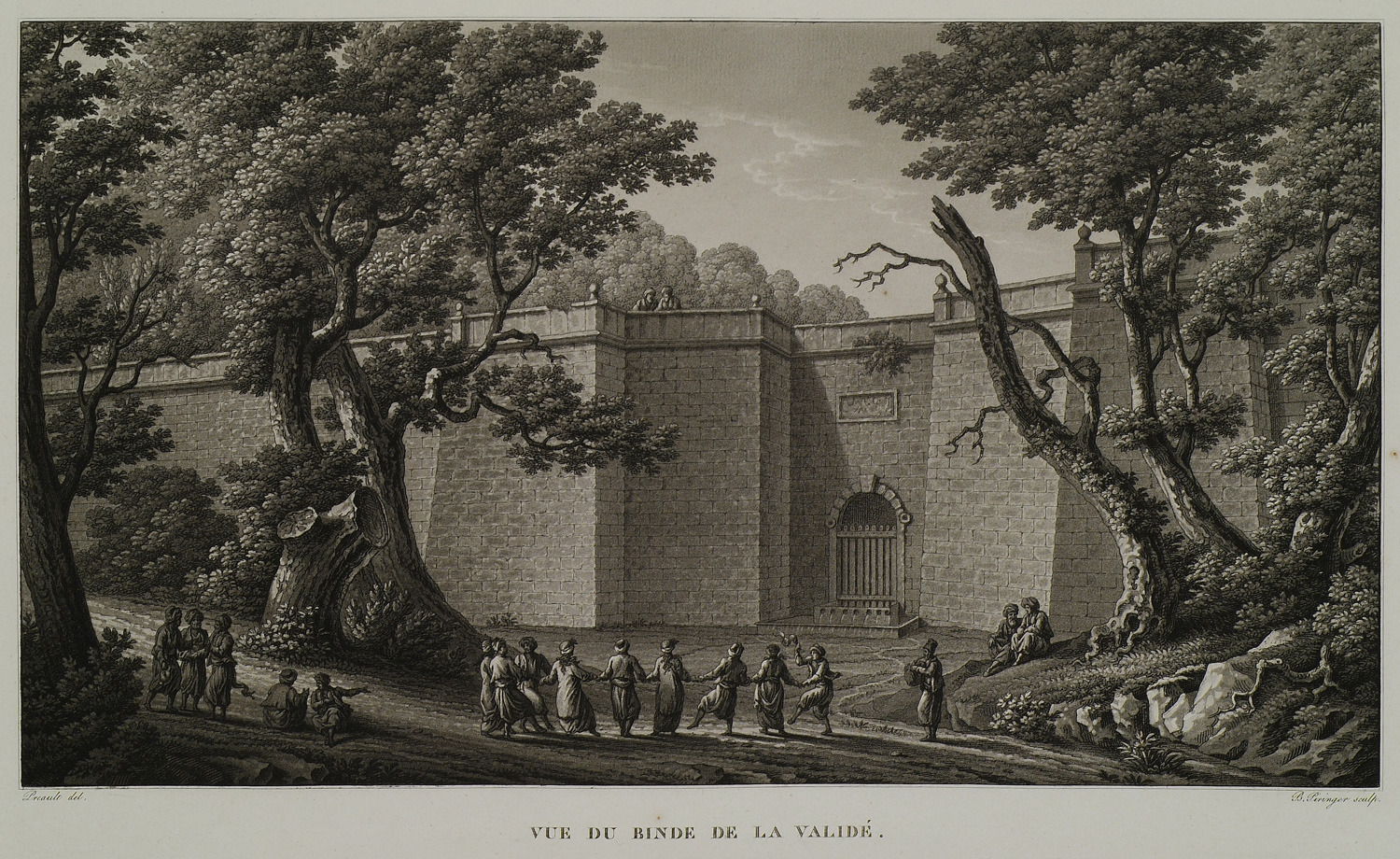

- Location within Istanbul
- Official name: Valide Bendi
- Country: Turkey
- Location: Bahçeköy, Sarıyer, Istanbul Province
- Coordinates: 41°11′28″N 28°59′16″E
- Opening date: 1796; 230 years ago

Dam and spillways
- Type of dam: Solid gravity dam
- Impounds: Ayazağa Creek
- Height (thalweg): 11.25 m (36.9 ft)
- Length: 103.90 m (340.9 ft)
- Width (crest): 4.72 m (15.5 ft)
- Width (base): 6.30 m (20.7 ft)

Reservoir
- Total capacity: 255,000 m^{3} (9,000,000 cu ft)
- Catchment area: 1.825 km^{2} (0.705 sq mi)

Valide Dam (Turkish: Valide Bendi) is a historic dam located in Sarıyer district of Istanbul Province, Turkey.

Valide Dam was built in 1796 by Ottoman Sultan Selim III (reigned 1789–1807) to provide water for the donations in Eyüp of his mother Mihrişah Sultan (c. 1745–1805), who was titled Valide sultan during his reign.

The dam is situated north of Bahçeköy, Sarıyer inside the Bentler Nature Park, which is part of the Belgrad Forest.

Valide Dam impounds Ayazağa Creek, a tributary of Acıelma Creek, and has a catchment area of 1.825 km^{2} (0.705 sq mi). It is a solid gravity dam constructed in masonry with its crest and the waterside wall covered by marble. Two buttresses in 6.30 m (20.7 ft) distance at toe are attached to the downstream wall to reinforce the structure. The dam is 11.25 m (36.9 ft) high from the thalweg and 103.90 m (340.9 ft) long at crest. The crest is 4.72 m (15.5 ft) and the base is 6.30 m (20.7 ft) wide. The dam has a reservoir capacity of 255,000 m^{3} (9,000,000 cu ft).
