= Lycée Français Pierre Loti d'Istanbul =

Location
- Tarabya Campus: Haydar Aliyev Caddesi n°128 Beyoğlu Campus: Tomtom Kaptan Sok. Beyoğlu

Information
- Principal: Frédéric Colombel
- Website: pierreloti.k12.tr

Lycée Français Pierre Loti d'Istanbul is an international French school located in Istanbul. It was formerly known as "Papillon" and later took its name from the French writer Pierre Loti, who lived in Istanbul for a period of time. The school provides education from preschool to the final year of high school. It has two campuses, one in Tarabya and the other in Beyoğlu. In the late 1990s and early 2000s, due to the earthquake risk associated with the building in Beyoğlu, the middle school and high school were relocated to Tarabya, while continuing their educational activities. The preschool and primary school, however, remained in Beyoğlu.

Lycée Français Pierre Loti d'Istanbul Campuses
