= Zekeriyaköy, Istanbul =

Turkish village

Zekeriyaköy
- Neighbourhood
- Location within Turkey Location within Istanbul
- Coordinates: 41°12′31″N 29°01′23″E
- Country: Turkey
- Province: Istanbul
- District: Sarıyer
- Population (2022): 22,558
- Time zone: UTC+3 (TRT)

Zekeriyaköy is an area of Sarıyer district in the European side of Istanbul. It is an upscale area in the hills to the north of downtown Istanbul. It is near the Black Sea coast and the Belgrad Forest.

== Development ==
In recent decades, Zekeriyaköy has undergone significant development. The area features villas, gated communities, and modern residential complexes.

== Amenities and attractions ==
- Education: Zekeriyaköy is home to several prestigious international and private schools.
- Recreation: The village is close to the Belgrad Forest, offering numerous outdoor activities such as hiking, biking, and picnicking.
- Shopping and dining: Zekeriyaköy offers various shops, cafes, and restaurants.

== Name ==
Zekeriyaköy takes its name from the türbe of Zekeriya Baba, which is behind the village mosque.
