= List of nature parks of Turkey =

Protected areas of Turkey
| Type | Number | Area (ha) |
|---|---|---|
| National parks (list) | 48 | 911,204 |
| Nature parks (list) | 261 | 108,332 |
| Nature preserve areas (list) | 31 | 46,455 |
| Wildlife protection areas (list) | 85 | 1,165,448 |
| Nature monuments (list) | 113 | 8,357 |
| Protected Plains (list) | 25 | 221,229 |
| Wetlands (National) | 59 | 869,697 |
| Wetlands (Local) | 32 | 92,236 |
| Grand total | 654 | 3,422,958 |
| Wetlands (Ramsar) (list) | 14 | 184,487 |

This is a list of nature parks of Turkey. As of October 2010, there are twelve nature reserves located at the coastal regions of the country. These protected areas are administered by the Directorate-General of Nature Protection and National Parks (Turkish: Doğa Koruma ve Milli Parklar Genel Müdürlüğü) of the Ministry of Environment and Forest.

| # | Name | Location | Area (ha) | Established |
|---|---|---|---|---|
| 1 | Ölüdeniz-Kıdrak Nature Park | Muğla | 1,020 | 1983 |
| 2 | Çorum-Çatak Nature Park | Çorum | 379 | 1984 |
| 3 | Lake Abant Nature Park | Bolu | 1,242.23 | 1988.10.21 |
| 4 | Yazılı Canyon Nature Park | Isparta | 546 | 1989 |
| 5 | Uzungöl Nature Park | Trabzon | 1,642 | 1989 |
| 6 | Kurşunlu Waterfall Nature Park | Antalya | 559 | 1991 |
| 7 | Gölcük Nature Park | Isparta | 5,888 | 1991 |
| 8 | Lake Bafa Nature Park | Aydın | 11,842 | 1994 |
| 9 | Polonezköy Nature Park | İstanbul | 2,931 | 1994 |
| 10 | Ayvalık Islands Nature Park | Balıkesir | 19,624.27 | 1995.04.21 |
| 11 | Ballıkayalar Nature Park | Kocaeli | 1,603 | 1995 |
| 12 | Beşkayalar Nature Park | Kocaeli | 1,099 | 1998 |
| 13 | Türkmenbaşı Nature Park | İstanbul | 6 | 1998 |
| 14 | Kocakoru Ormanı Nature Park | Konya | 331 | 1998 |
| 15 | Artabel Lakes Nature Park | Gümüşhane | 5,819.86 | 1998.12.22 |
| 16 | Akdağ Nature Park | Denizli | 14,692.33 | 2000.06.29 |
| 17 | Karagöl Nature Park | Artvin | 368 | 2002 |
| 18 | İncekum Nature Park | Antalya | 27 | 2006 |
| 19 | Ballıca Mağarası Nature Park | Tokat | 483 | 2007 |
| 20 | Hamsilos Bay Nature Park | Sinop | 68 | 2007 |
| 21 | 26 Agustos Nature Park | Afyonkarahisar | 66.90 | 2008.04.03 |
| 22 | Çamkoru Nature Park | Ankara | 215 | 2008 |
| 23 | Meryemana Nature Park | İzmir | 363 | 2008 |
| 24 | Mesir Nature Park | Manisa | 12 | 2008 |
| 25 | Örnekköy Nature Park | İzmir | 199 | 2008 |
| 26 | Gölbaşı Gölleri Nature Park | Adıyaman | 2,080 | 2008 |
| 27 | Fatih Forest Nature Park | İstanbul | 148 | 2008 |
| 28 | Kapıçam Nature Park | K.Maraş | 179 | 2008 |
| 29 | Karaahmetli Nature Park | Kırıkkale | 108 | 2009 |
| 30 | Mavikent Nature Park | Antalya | 43 | 2009 |
| 31 | Sıklık Nature Park | Çorum | 64 | 2009 |
| 32 | Şahinler Nature Park | Ankara | 34 | 2009 |
| 33 | Hazım Dağlı Nature Park | Çankırı | 126 | 2009 |
| 34 | Ulugöl Nature Park | Ordu | 26 | 2009 |
| 35 | Turgut Özal Nature Park | Malatya | 40 | 2009 |
| 36 | Davulbaztepe Nature Park | Yozgat | 73 | 2009 |
| 37 | Yavşan Yaylası Nature Park | Kahramanmaraş | 340 | 2009 |
| 38 | Aşıkpaşa Nature Park | Kırşehir | 127.59 | 2010.11.08 |
| 39 | Ağaçbaşı Nature Park | Giresun | 89.32 | 2010.02.10 |
| 40 | Sera Gölü Nature Park | Trabzon | 22 | 2010 |
| 41 | Dağılcak Nature Park | Adana | 3 | 2011 |
| 42 | Karataş Nature Park | Adana | 30 | 2011 |
| 43 | Okturdede Nature Park | Afyonkarahisar | 57 | 2011 |
| 44 | Şahin Yaylası 75. Yıl Göleti Nature Park | Amasya | 48 | 2011 |
| 45 | Eğriova Nature Park | Bolu | 10 | 2011 |
| 46 | Karagöl Nature Park | Ankara | 11 | 2011 |
| 47 | Kartaltepe Nature Park | Ankara | 93 | 2011 |
| 48 | Sorgun Göleti Nature Park | Ankara | 50 | 2011 |
| 49 | Tekkedağı Nature Park | Ankara | 100 | 2011 |
| 50 | Aluçdağı Nature Park | Ankara | 96.52 | 2011.07.11 |
| 51 | Cemal Tural Nature Park | Ardahan | 35 | 2011.07.11 |
| 52 | Tavşanburnu Nature Park | Aydın | 14 | 2011 |
| 53 | Sarımsaklı Nature Park | Balıkesir | 2 | 2011 |
| 54 | Değirmenboğazı Nature Park | Balıkesir | 25 | 2011 |
| 55 | Darıdere Nature Park | Balıkesir | 10 | 2011 |
| 56 | Balamba Nature Park | Bartın | 12 | 2011 |
| 57 | Ahatlar Nature Park | Bartın | 9.35 | 2011.07.11 |
| 58 | Malabadi Nature Park | Batman | 24 | 2011 |
| 59 | Küçükelmalı Nature Park | Bilecik | 10 | 2011 |
| 60 | Lake Sünnet Nature Park | Bolu | 80 | 2011 |
| 61 | Karagöl Nature Park | Bolu | 35 | 2011 |
| 62 | Gölcük Nature Park | Bolu | 38 | 2011 |
| 63 | Beşpınarlar Nature Park | Bolu | 27 | 2011 |
| 64 | Göksu Nature Park | Bolu | 25 | 2011 |
| 65 | Salda Gölü Nature Park | Burdur | 12 | 2011 |
| 66 | Serenler Tepesi Nature Park | Burdur | 38 | 2011 |
| 67 | Suuçtu Nature Park | Bursa | 10 | 2011 |
| 68 | Ayazmapınarı Nature Park | Çanakkale | 5.85 | 2011.07.11 |
| 69 | Kenbağ Nature Park | Çankırı | 36 | 2011 |
| 70 | Kurugöl Nature Park | Düzce | 22 | 2011 |
| 71 | Güzeldere Waterfall Nature Park | Düzce | 20 | 2011 |
| 72 | Gökçetepe Nature Park | Edirne | 50 | 2011 |
| 73 | Danişment Nature Park | Edirne | 13 | 2011 |
| 74 | Lake Hazar Nature Park | Elazığ | 23 | 2011 |
| 75 | Musaözü Nature Park | Eskişehir | 50 | 2011 |
| 76 | Fidanlık Nature Park | Eskişehir | 12 | 2011 |
| 77 | Dülükbaba Nature Park | Gaziantep | 306 | 2011 |
| 78 | Koçkayası Nature Park | Giresun | 354 | 2011 |
| 79 | Tomara Waterfall Nature Park | Gümüşhane | 7 | 2011 |
| 80 | Lake Limni Nature Park | Gümüşhane | 72 | 2011 |
| 81 | Başpınar Nature Park | Isparta | 40 | 2011 |
| 82 | Şamlar Nature Park | İstanbul | 335 | 2011 |
| 83 | Marmaracık Koyu Nature Park | İstanbul | 7 | 2011 |
| 84 | Kirazlıbent Nature Park | İstanbul | 19 | 2011 |
| 85 | Falih Rıfkı Atay Nature Park | İstanbul | 16 | 2011 |
| 86 | Bentler Nature Park | İstanbul | 16 | 2011 |
| 87 | Neşet Suyu Nature Park | İstanbul | 67 | 2011 |
| 88 | Fatih Çeşmesi Nature Park | İstanbul | 30 | 2011 |
| 89 | Mihrabat Nature Park | İstanbul | 20 | 2011 |
| 90 | Fatih Sultan Mehmet Nature Park | İstanbul | 112 | 2011 |
| 91 | Elmasburnu Nature Park | İstanbul | 13 | 2011 |
| 92 | Avcıkoru Nature Park | İstanbul | 649.37 | 2011.07.11 |
| 93 | Çilingoz Nature Park | İstanbul | 18 | 2011 |
| 94 | Irmak Nature Park | İstanbul | 10 | 2011 |
| 95 | Mehmet Akif Ersoy Nature Park | İstanbul | 23 | 2011 |
| 96 | Kömürcübent Nature Park | İstanbul | 3 | 2011 |
| 97 | Ayvat Bendi Nature Park | İstanbul | 51.05 | 2011.07.11 |
| 98 | Büyükada Nature Park | İstanbul | 4 | 2011 |
| 99 | Değirmenburnu Nature Park | İstanbul | 12 | 2011 |
| 100 | Dilburnu Nature Park | İstanbul | 7 | 2011 |
| 101 | Göktürk Göleti Nature Park | İstanbul | 56 | 2011 |
| 102 | Yamanlardağı Nature Park | İzmir | 40 | 2011 |
| 103 | Ekmeksiz Beach Nature Park | İzmir | 15 | 2011 |
| 104 | Karagöl Nature Park | İzmir | 19 | 2011 |
| 105 | Efeoğlu Nature Park | İzmir | 23 | 2011 |
| 106 | Gümüldür Nature Park | İzmir | 7 | 2011 |
| 107 | Gümüşsuyu Nature Park | İzmir | 2 | 2011 |
| 108 | Çiçekli Nature Park | İzmir | 21 | 2011 |
| 109 | Tanay Nature Park | İzmir | 30 | 2011 |
| 110 | Çamlık Nature Park | Karabük | 15 | 2011 |
| 111 | Gürleyik Nature Park | Karabük | 15 | 2011 |
| 112 | Soğuksu Nature Park | Ankara | 11 | 2011 |
| 113 | Dipsizgöl Nature Park | Kastamonu | 5 | 2011 |
| 114 | Yeşilyuva Nature Park | Kastamonu | 5 | 2011 |
| 115 | Şerifebacı Nature Park | Kastamonu | 10 | 2011 |
| 116 | Derebağ Waterfall Nature Park | Kayseri | 10 | 2011 |
| 117 | Kavaklımeşe Korusu Nature Park | Kırklareli | 36 | 2011 |
| 118 | Hisar Çamlığı Nature Park | Kilis | 16 | 2011 |
| 119 | Kuzuyayla Nature Park | Kocaeli | 110 | 2011 |
| 120 | Uzuntarla Nature Park | Kocaeli | 36 | 2011 |
| 121 | Suadiye Nature Park | Kocaeli | 37 | 2011 |
| 122 | Eriklitepe Nature Park | Kocaeli | 63 | 2011 |
| 123 | Akyokuş Nature Park | Konya | 21.57 | 2011.07.11 |
| 124 | Yakamanastır Nature Park | Konya | 89 | 2011 |
| 125 | Enne Barajı Nature Park | Kütahya | 47 | 2011 |
| 126 | Çamlıca Nature Park | Kütahya | 35 | 2011 |
| 127 | Süreyya Nature Park | Manisa | 5 | 2011 |
| 128 | Pullu I Nature Park | Mersin | 10.3 | 2011 |
| 129 | Talat Göktepe Nature Park | Mersin | 26 | 2011 |
| 130 | Pullu II Nature Park | Mersin | 34 | 2011 |
| 132 | Karaekşi Nature Park | Mersin | 9 | 2011 |
| 133 | Gümüşkum Nature Park | Mersin | 23 | 2011 |
| 134 | Şehitlik Nature Park | Mersin | 6 | 2011 |
| 135 | Kuyuluk Nature Park | Mersin | 20 | 2011 |
| 136 | Usuluk Bay Nature Park | Muğla | 14 | 2011 |
| 137 | Katrancu Bay Nature Park | Muğla | 21 | 2011 |
| 138 | İnbükü Nature Park | Muğla | 36 | 2011 |
| 139 | Çubucak Nature Park | Muğla | 21 | 2011 |
| 140 | Kovanlık Nature Park | Muğla | 4 | 2011 |
| 141 | Küçük Kargı Nature Park | Muğla | 15 | 2011 |
| 142 | Ömer Eşen Nature Park | Muğla | 4 | 2011 |
| 143 | Güvercinlik Nature Park | Muğla | 3 | 2011 |
| 144 | Çetibeli Nature Park | Muğla | 5 | 2011 |
| 145 | 80. Yıl Cumhuriyet Hatıra Nature Park | Muş | 15 | 2011 |
| 146 | Çınarsuyu Nature Park | Ordu | 7 | 2011 |
| 147 | Çiftmazı Nature Park | Osmaniye | 23 | 2011 |
| 148 | Province Forest Nature Park | Sakarya | 103 | 2011 |
| 149 | Lake Poyrazlar Nature Park | Sakarya | 231 | 2011 |
| 150 | Kuzuluk Nature Park | Sakarya | 12 | 2011 |
| 151 | Sarıgazel Nature Park | Samsun | 127 | 2011 |
| 152 | Vezirsuyu Nature Park | Samsun | 35 | 2011 |
| 153 | Çamlıgöl Nature Park | Samsun | 25 | 2011 |
| 154 | Hz. Veysel Karani Nature Park | Siirt | 13 | 2011 |
| 155 | Tatlıca Nature Park | Sinop | 45 | 2011 |
| 156 | Topalçam Nature Park | Sinop | 15 | 2011 |
| 157 | Kızılkavraz Nature Park | Sivas | 6 | 2011 |
| 158 | Karşıyaka Nature Park | Sivas | 23 | 2011 |
| 159 | Gölpınar Nature Park | Şanlıurfa | 199 | 2011 |
| 160 | Çamlıkoy Nature Park | Tekirdağ | 45 | 2011 |
| 161 | Atatürk Forest Nature Park | Tekirdağ | 28 | 2011 |
| 162 | Orman Evleri Nature Park | Tokat | 5 | 2011 |
| 163 | Lake Zinav Nature Park | Tokat | 50 | 2011 |
| 164 | Görnek Nature Park | Trabzon | 5 | 2011 |
| 165 | Kayabaşı Nature Park | Trabzon | 120 | 2011 |
| 166 | Çamburnu Nature Park | Trabzon | 5 | 2011 |
| 167 | Çalcamili Nature Park | Trabzon | 17 | 2011 |
| 168 | Örenönü Nature Park | Tunceli | 12 | 2011 |
| 169 | Evrendede Nature Park | Uşak | 7 | 2011 |
| 170 | İpekyolu Nature Park | Van | 3 | 2011 |
| 171 | Harmankaya Nature Park | Yalova | 1 | 2011 |
| 172 | Delmece Yaylası Nature Park | Yalova | 20 | 2011 |
| 173 | Kadıpınarı Nature Park | Yozgat | 9 | 2011 |
| 174 | Oluközü Nature Park | Yozgat | 29 | 2011 |
| 175 | Üçtepeler Nature Park | Yozgat | 172 | 2011 |
| 176 | Göldağı Nature Park | Zonguldak | 14 | 2011 |
| 177 | İncüvez Çamlığı Nature Park | Zonguldak | 8 | 2011 |
| 178 | Milli Egemenlik Nature Park | Zonguldak | 29 | 2011 |
| 179 | Sülüklügöl Nature Park | Bolu | 803 | 2011 |
| 180 | Burç Nature Park | Gaziantep | 192 | 2012 |
| 181 | Hacet Creek Nature Park | İstanbul | 16 | 2012 |
| 182 | Kadınçayırı Nature Park | Çankırı | 422 | 2012 |
| 183 | Harmankaya Canyon Nature Park | Bilecik | 260 | 2012 |
| 184 | Kuzalan Nature Park | Giresun | 482 | 2013 |
| 185 | Yedideğirmenler Nature Park | Giresun | 103 | 2013 |
| 186 | Ulubey Canyon Nature Park | Uşak | 119 | 2013 |
| 187 | Gürcüoluk Mağarası Nature Park | Bartın | 50 | 2013 |
| 188 | Tunca Valley Nature Park | Rize | 4,082 | 2013 |
| 189 | Altıparmak Nature Park | Artvin | 2,110.92 | 2013.07.11 |
| 190 | Danamandıra Nature Park | Istanbul | 381.09 | 2015.12.16 |
| 191 | Akgöl Nature Park | Sinop | 40.01 | 2018.05.28 |
| 192 | Akyamaç Waterfall Nature Park | Rize | 49.90 | 2014.08.25 |
| 193 | Alleben Nature Park | Gaziantep | 282.45 | 2016.04.22 |
| 194 | Amazon Nature Park | Samsun | 562.59 | 2015.09.21 |
| 195 | Aydıncık Nature Park | Mersin | 23.71 | 2011.07.11 |
| 196 | Aydınpınar Waterfalls Nature Park | Düzce | 100.60 | 2014.08.25 |
| 197 | Ayıkayası Nature Park | Bolu | 248.32 | 2014.08.29 |
| 198 | Aymaç Nature Park | Giresun | 40.25 | 2017.09.22 |

== See also ==
- List of national parks of Turkey
