= Usuluk Bay Nature Park =

Nature park in Usuluk Bay, Muğla, Turkey

- Usuluk Koyu Tabiat Parkı
- Location within Turkey
- Location: Torba, Bodrum, Muğla Province, Turkey
- Nearest city: Bodrum
- Coordinates: 37°05′00″N 27°28′15″E
- Established: July 2011; 15 years ago
- Governing body: Directorate-General of Nature Protection and National Parks; Ministry of Environment and Forest

Usuluk Bay Nature Park (Turkish: Usuluk Koyu Tabiat Parkı) is a nature park at Usuluk Bay in Muğla Province, southwestern Turkey.

Usuluk Bay is located on the highway Bodrum-Milas D.330 at Torba village, northeast of Bodrum in Muğla Province. The area at Usuluk Bay coast was a popular picnic place for the Bodrum residents, used free of charge in the past. In 2005, the area was leased to a private company for a lease term of 27 years with the purpose to run the place with an entrance fee and payment for campers and caravan travelers. Since the related bylaws did not permit the use of the area with diversified purposes, the residents protested against the ruling of the Ministry of Forest and Water Management. In July 2011, the status of Usuluk Bay was changed from the "A-grade resort" to a nature park by the ministry.
