= Uzunkum Nature Park =

Coastal area nature park in Kocaeli Province, Turkey

- Uzunkum Tabiat Parkı
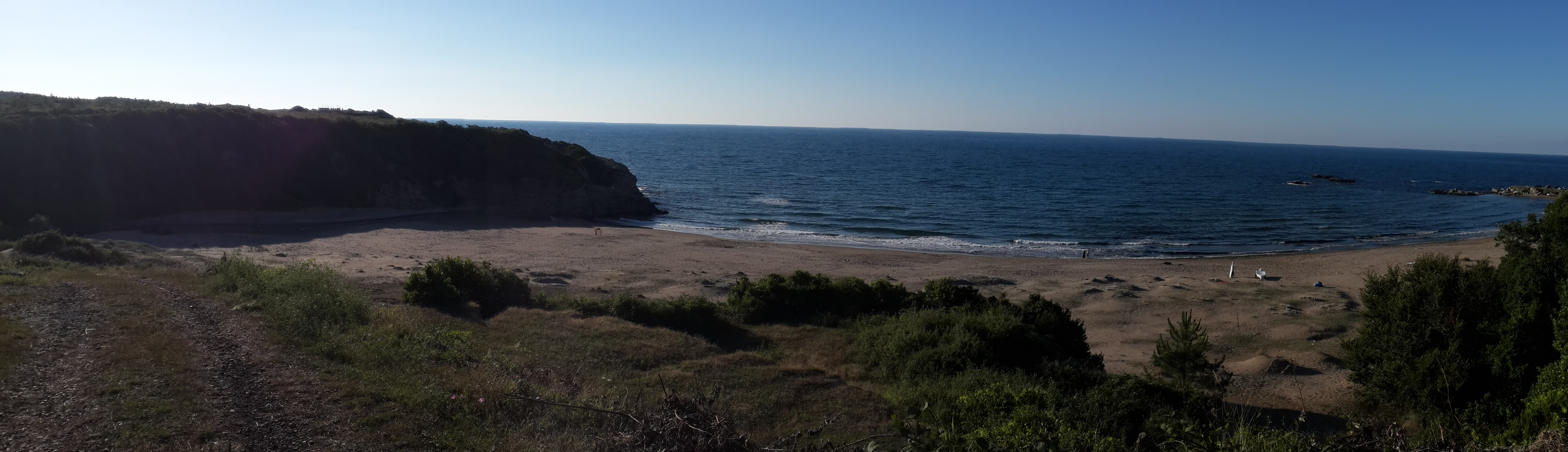

- Location within Turkey
- Location: Kandıra, Kocaeli Province, Turkey
- Nearest city: Kandıra
- Coordinates: 41°12′00″N 30°16′29″E
- Area: 80 ha (200 acres)
- Established: 2014; 12 years ago
- Governing body: Directorate-General of Nature Protection and National Parks; Ministry of Environment and Forest
- Website: www.sunnetgolu.com

Uzunkum Nature Park (Turkish: Uzunkum Tabiat Parkı) is a nature park declared coastal area in Kocaeli Province, northwestern Turkey.

Uzunkum, literally long sandy beach, is located at Black Sea east of Cebeci village in Kandıra district of Kocaeli Province. The area was declared a nature park by the Ministry of Environment and Forest in 2014. The nature park consists of the parts, the sandy beach in the north and forested hillside. It covers an area of 235 ha (580 acres).

The nature park offers outdoor recreational activities like hiking, swimming, surfing and angling.

Flora

The vegetation of the nature park consists of the endangered sea daffodil (Pancratium maritimum), Syrian juniper (Juniperus drupacea), juniper, Valonia oak (Quercus macrolepis), laurel (Laurus nobilis), oak, hornbeam (Carpinus), common ash (Fraxinus excelsior), cedar (Cedrus), cypress, willow, rose hip, buxus, European cornel (Cornus mas), spurge (Cornus mas), Cercis, pilewort, Crocus, trefoil (Trifolium), hemp and diverse algae species.

Fauna

The nature is habitat for the mammals fox, jackal, hare, beaver, badger, crested porcupine, the reptile tortoise, the bird species woodcock, quail, gull, black cormorant, francolin, partridge, common blackbird, kingfisher and owl.
