= Karaekşi Nature Park =

Nature park in Turkey

- Karaekşi Tabiat Parkı
- Location within Turkey
- Location: Hacınuhlu, Mut, Mersin Province, Turkey
- Coordinates: 36°40′46″N 33°28′01″E
- Area: 8.5 ha (21 acres)
- Established: 2011; 15 years ago
- Governing body: Directorate-General of Nature Protection and National Parks; Ministry of Forest and Water Management

Karaekşi Nature Park (Turkish: Karaekşi Tabiat Parkı or more formally, Karaekşi Nature Park and Trout Hatchery Turkish: Karaekşi Tabiat Parkı ve Alabalık Üretme İstasyonu) is a nature park in Mersin Province, Turkey

The nature park situated in Hacınuhlu village of Mut ilçe (district) in Mersin Province at 36°40′46″N 33°28′01″E. Its distance to Mut is about 7 km (4.3 mi). It was declared a nature park by the Ministry of Forest and Water Management in 2011. It covers an area of 8.5 ha (21 acres). The park is in a forest of plane trees and Turkish pines. It stretches along a creek flowing into Göksu River. There are trout ponds, restaurants, children parks, a parking lot etc. in Karaekşi.
