= Elmasburnu Nature Park =

Nature park in Beykoz, Istanbul, Turkey

- Elmasburnu Tabiat Parkı
- Location within Istanbul
- Location: Riva, Beykoz, Istanbul Province, Turkey
- Nearest city: Riva, Beykoz
- Coordinates: 41°13′39″N 29°13′08″E
- Area: 13.34 ha (33.0 acres)
- Established: 2011
- Governing body: Directorate-General of Nature Protection and National Parks; Ministry of Environment and Forest

Elmasburnu Nature Park (Turkish: Elmasburnu Tabiat Parkı) is a nature park in Istanbul Province, Turkey.

Elmasburnu (literally "Cape Diamond") is situated east of Riva village in the north of Beykoz district in Istanbul Province on the coast of Black Sea. An area just south of the cape was declared a nature park by the Ministry of Environment and Forest in 2011. It covers an area of about 13.34 ha (33.0 acres).

== See also ==
- Polonezköy Nature Park, in Beykoz
