= Başpınar Nature Park =

Nature park in Isparta, Turkey

Baspınar Nature Park
- Başpınar Tabiat Parkı
- Location within Turkey
- Location: Aksu, Isparta Province, Turkey
- Coordinates: 37°50′00″N 31°06′31″E
- Area: 395 daa (0.395 km^{2}; 0.153 sq mi)
- Established: 2011; 15 years ago
- Governing body: Directorate-General of Nature Protection and National Parks; Ministry of Forest and Water Management

Başpınar Nature Park (Turkish: Başpınar Tabiat Parkı) is a nature park in Isparta Province, Turkey

Başpınar Nature Park is in the rural area of Aksu ilçe (district) of Isparta Province at 37°50′00″N 31°06′31″E. Its distance to Aksu is 7 km (4.3 mi). It was declared a nature park by the Ministry of Forest and Water Management on 11 July 2011. It is situated in the valley of a tributary of Aksu River and to the east of Sorgun Dam. Its elevation is 1,365 m (4,478 ft) The nature park covers an area of 395 daa (0.395 km^{2}; 0.153 sq mi). Nearby visitor attractions are the dam or the Zindan Cave.
