= Pullu I Nature Park =

Nature park in Anamur, Mersin, Turkey

- Pullu I Tabiat Parkı
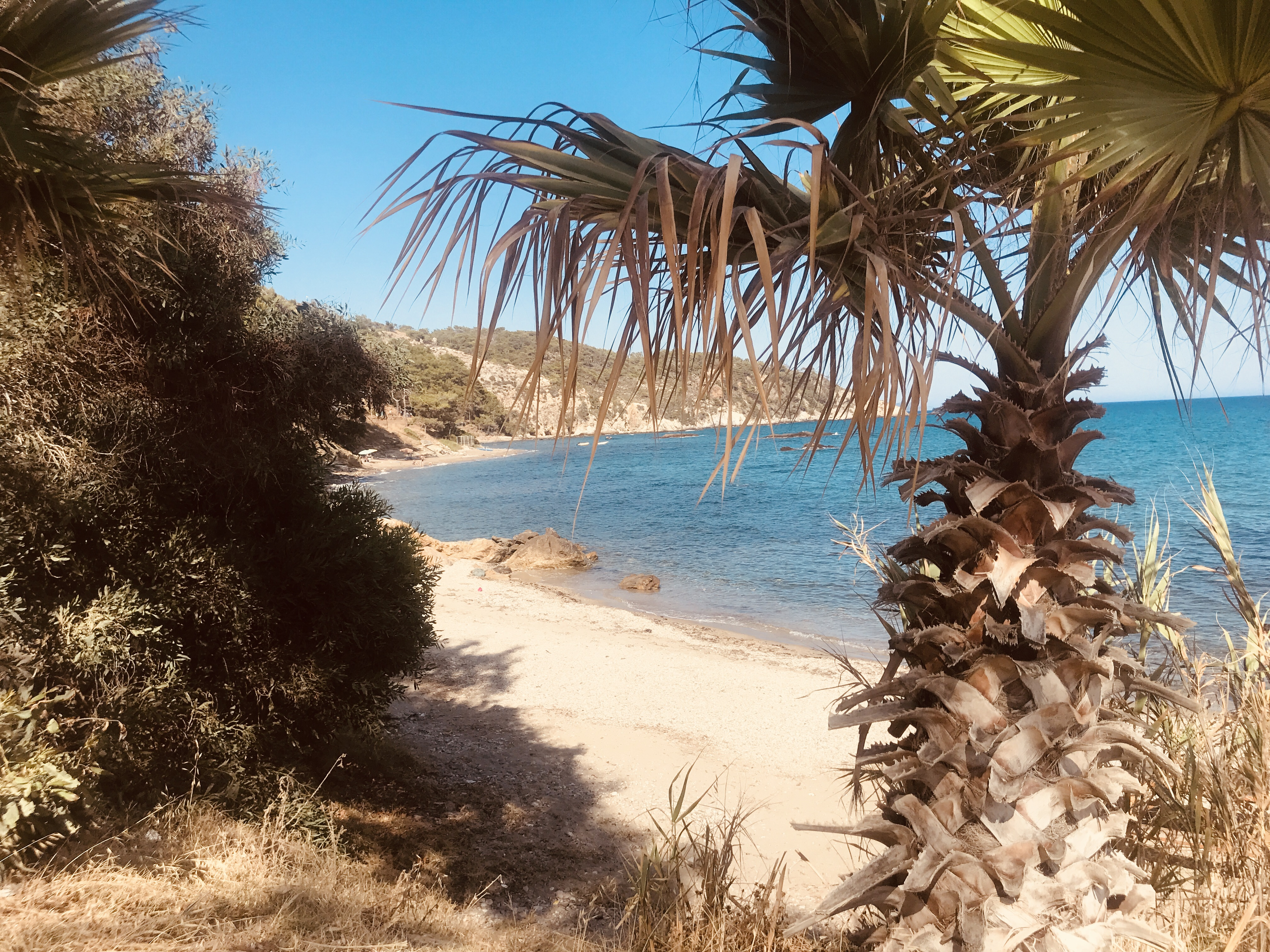

- Location within Turkey
- Location: Anamur, Mersin Province, Turkey
- Coordinates: 36°05′15″N 32°54′38″E
- Area: 10.3 ha (25 acres)
- Established: 2011; 15 years ago
- Governing body: Directorate-General of Nature Protection and National Parks; Ministry of Environment and Forest

Pullu I Nature Park (Turkish: Pullu I Tabiat Parkı) is a coastal nature park in Anamur ilçe (district) of Mersin Province, Turkey. The index "I" is to distinguish the park from a neighboring park with the same name.

The park is a coastal park between the Mediterranean Sea and the Mersin-Anamur highway D.400, which runs parallel to Mediterranean Sea coast. Anamur and Mamure Castle are to the west, Bozyazı and Mersin are to the east and Bozdoğan village is to the north of the park. Its distance to Anamur is 7 km (4.3 mi) and to Mersin is 220 km (140 mi). It covers an area of 10.3 ha (25 acres). In 1980, the area at the Mediterranean Sea side was declared a recreation area. In 2011, it was registered as a nature park by the Ministry of Environment and Forest.

The nature park offers outdoor recreational activities for 1,000–1,500 visitors on daily basis such as hiking, swimming and picnicing. Camping and renting of cottages or bungalows are also available. The park offers place for 180 campers and 30 caravans.

The nature park has Mediterranean climate. Dominant vegetation in the park are the trees red pine (Pinus resinosa) and jarrah (Eucalyptus marginata) as well as the shrubs topped lavender (Lavandula stoechas), marjoram (Origanum) and caper spurge (Euphorbia lathyris). The sandy beach of the nature park is an egg laying site for the loggerhead sea turtle (Caretta caretta). The Mediterranean monk seal (Monachus monachus), living in the coastal sea of Anamur, may be also observed at site.

== See also ==
- 100th Anniversary (Gümüşkum) Nature Park
