= Harmankaya =

Harmankaya can refer to:

- Harmankaya Canyon Nature Park
- Harmankaya, Cumayeri
- Harmankaya, Kemaliye
- Harmankaya Nature Park
