= Lake Sünnet Nature Park =

Nature park in Bolu, Turkey

- Sünnet Gölü Tabiat Parkı
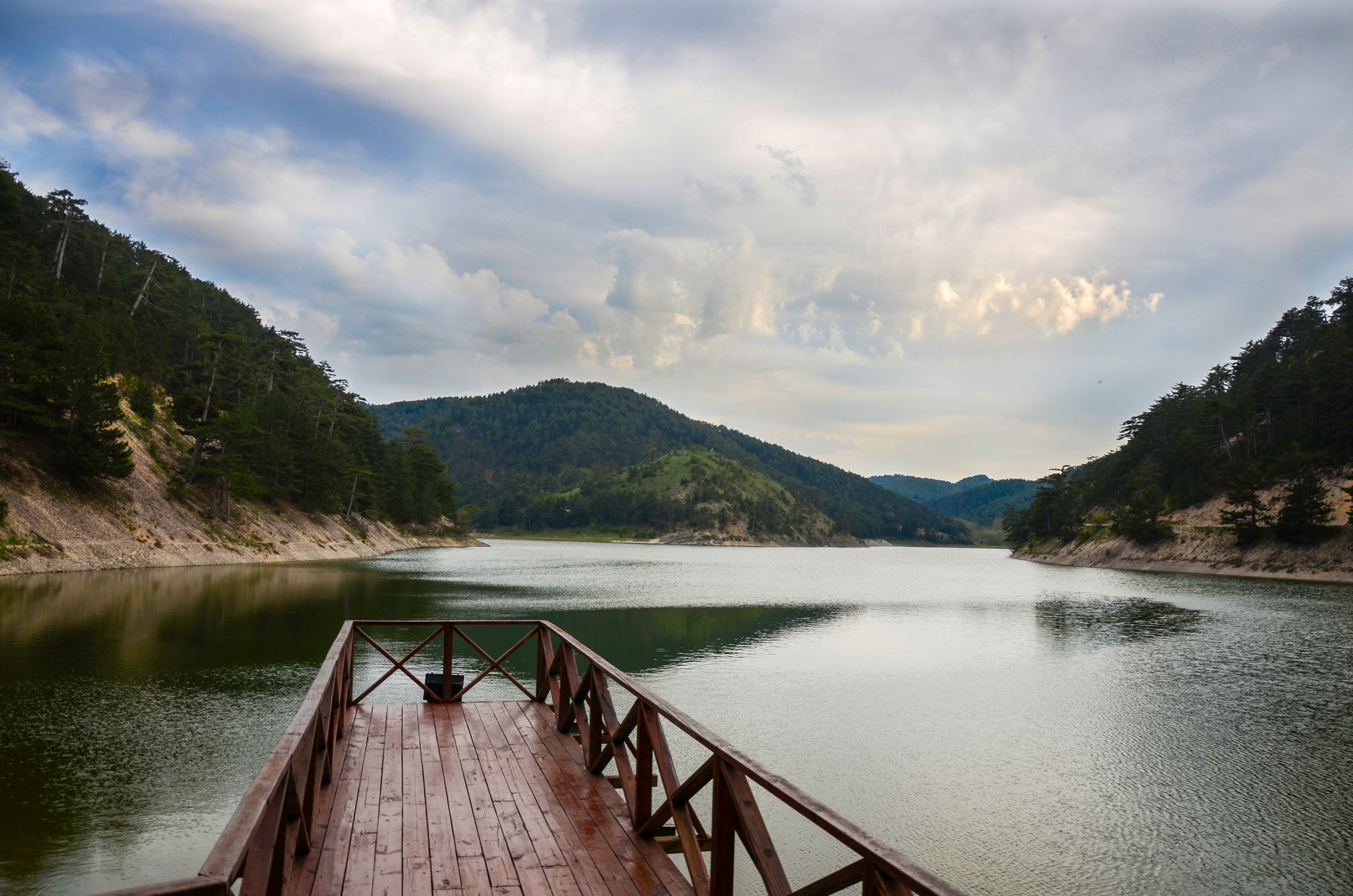
- A view from Lake Sünnet.

- Location within Turkey
- Location: Göynük, Bolu Province, Turkey
- Nearest city: Göynük
- Coordinates: 40°25′33″N 30°57′23″E
- Area: 80 ha (200 acres)
- Established: July 11, 2011; 14 years ago
- Governing body: Directorate-General of Nature Protection and National Parks; Ministry of Environment and Forest
- Website: www.sunnetgolu.com

Lake Sünnet Nature Park (Turkish: Sünnet Gölü Tabiat Parkı) is a nature park declared protected area at Lake Sünnet in Bolu Province, northwestern Turkey.

Lake Sünnet is located about 27 km (17 mi) east of Göynük and 105 km (65 mi) southwest of Bolu in Bolu Province. It was formed by landslide in a narrow and deep valley between Kurudağ and Erenler Hill. The lake covers an area of 18 ha (44 acres) at 820 m (2,690 ft) high above mean sea level. Its depth reaches up to 22 m (72 ft). The lake is fed by creeks and springs around.

An 80 ha (200 acres)-area at the lake was registered as A-grade Forest Recreational Area in 1973. On July 11, 2011, the area was declared a nature park by the Ministry of Environment and Forest.

The nature park offers outdoor recreational activities like hiking, biking and picnicking.

A hotel with 45 rooms and 115 beds, a restaurant, an outdoor coffeehouse and a sport court are available at the nature park.
