= Dilburnu Nature Park =

Protected area in Turkey

- Dilburnu Tabiat Parkı
- Location within Istanbul
- Location: Büyükada, Adalar, Istanbul Province, Turkey
- Nearest city: Büyükada
- Coordinates: 40°51′16″N 29°07′06″E
- Area: 6.88 ha (17.0 acres)
- Established: 2011
- Governing body: Directorate-General of Nature Protection and National Parks; Ministry of Environment and Forest

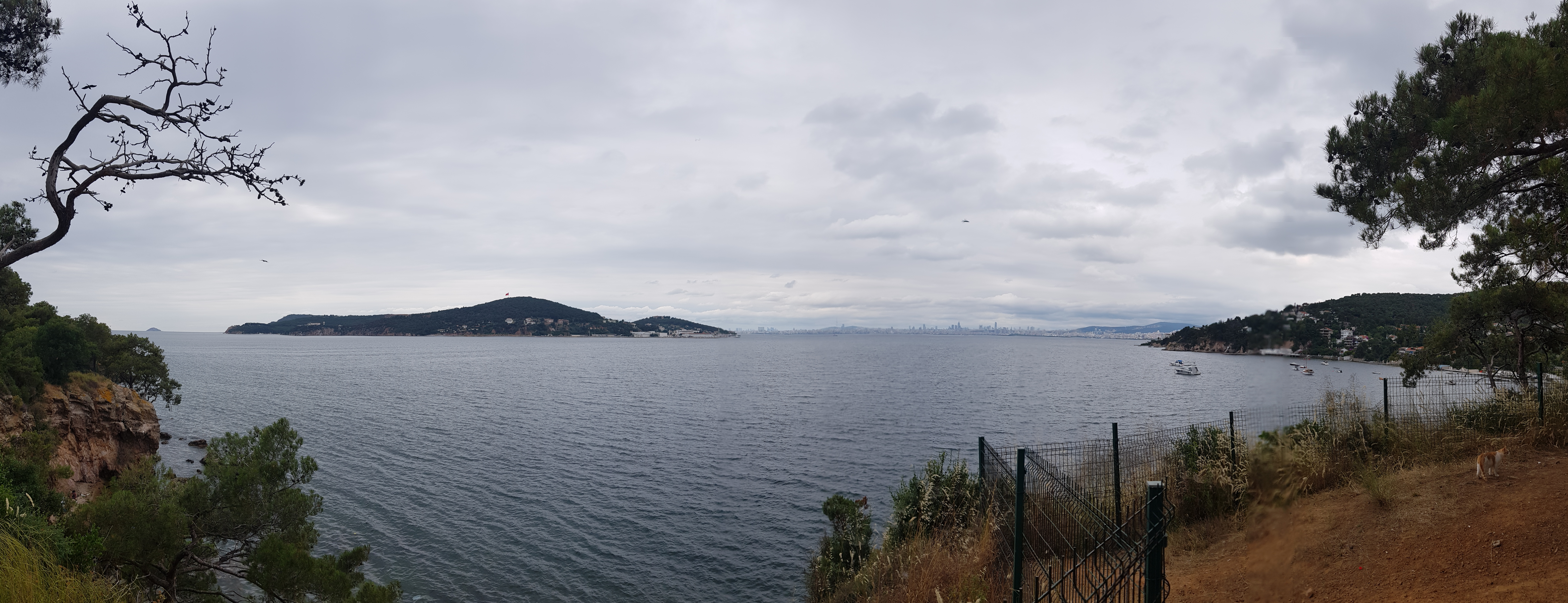
Dilburnu Nature Park

Dilburnu Nature Park (Turkish: Dilburnu Tabiat Parkı) is a nature park in Istanbul Province, Turkey.

== Geography ==
Dilburnu (literally "Cape Tongue") is situated on the western part of Büyükada (literally: Big Island), the biggest of the Princes' Islands, a group of nine islands in the Sea of Marmara, in Adalar district southeast of Istanbul Province. Dilburnu and its surrounding area were declared a nature park by the Ministry of Environment and Forest in 2011. It covers an area of about 6.88 ha (17.0 acres).

== See also ==
- Büyükada Nature Park, on the eastern part of Büyükada
- Değirmenburnu Nature Park, on the neighboring island Heybeliada
