= Başpınar =

Başpınar is a Turkish place name meaning "the head (main) spring" and may refer to the following places in Turkey:

- Başpınar, Adıyaman, a village in the District of Adıyaman, Adıyaman Province
- Başpınar, Aydıntepe, a village in the District of Aydıntepe, Bayburt Province
- Başpınar, İspir
- Başpınar, Kemaliye
- Başpınar, Korkuteli, a village in the District of Korkuteli, Antalya Province
- Başpınar, Osmancık

== See also ==
- Başpınar Nature Park
