= Lake Poyrazlar Nature Park =

Lake in Sakarya, Turkey

- Poyrazlar Gölü Tabiat Parkı
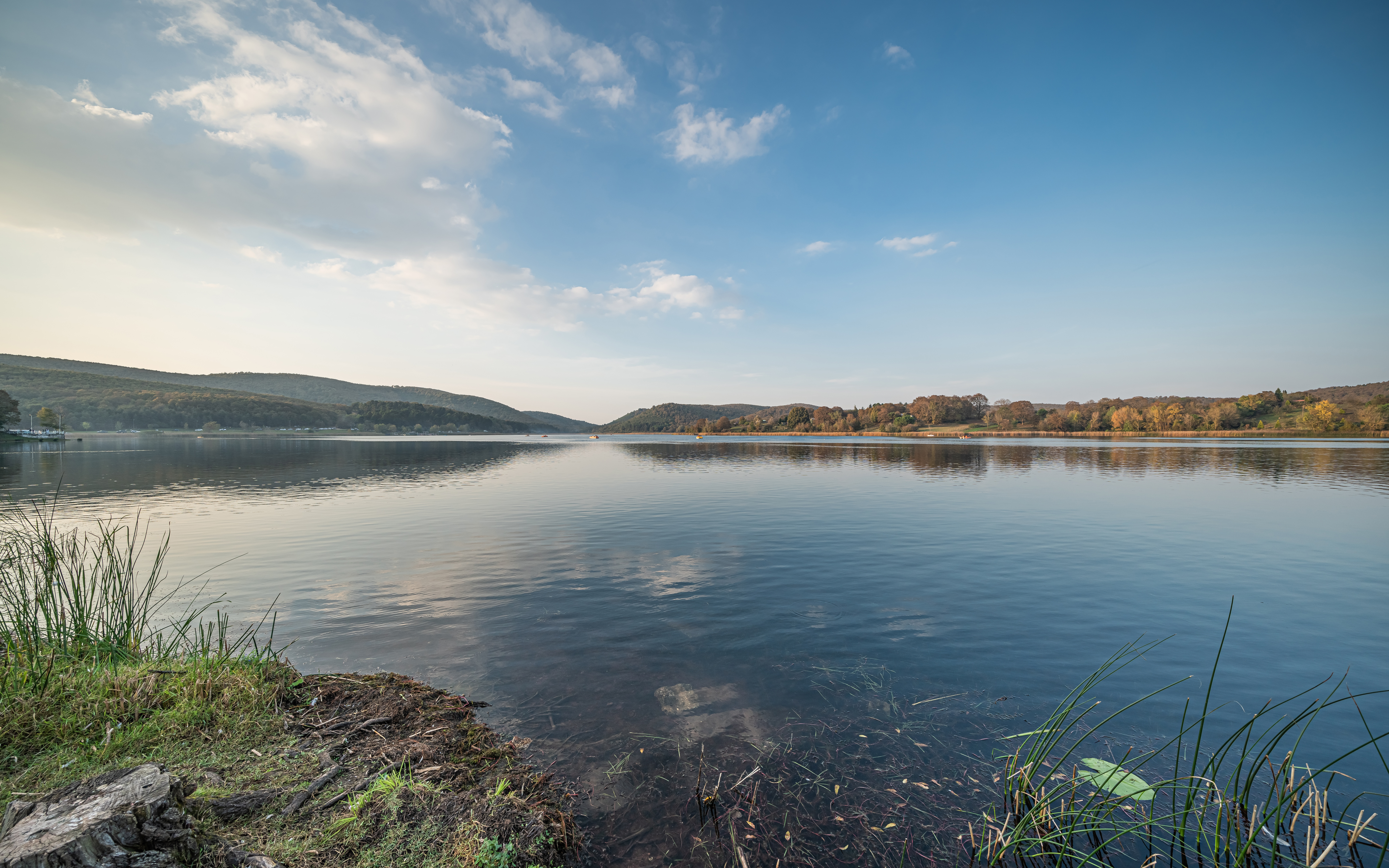
- A view of Lake Poyrazlar.

- Location within Turkey
- Location: Poyrazlar village, Adapazarı, Sakarya Province, Turkey
- Nearest city: Adapazarı
- Coordinates: 40°49′58″N 30°28′05″E
- Established: 2011; 15 years ago
- Governing body: Directorate-General of Nature Protection and National Parks; Ministry of Environment and Forest

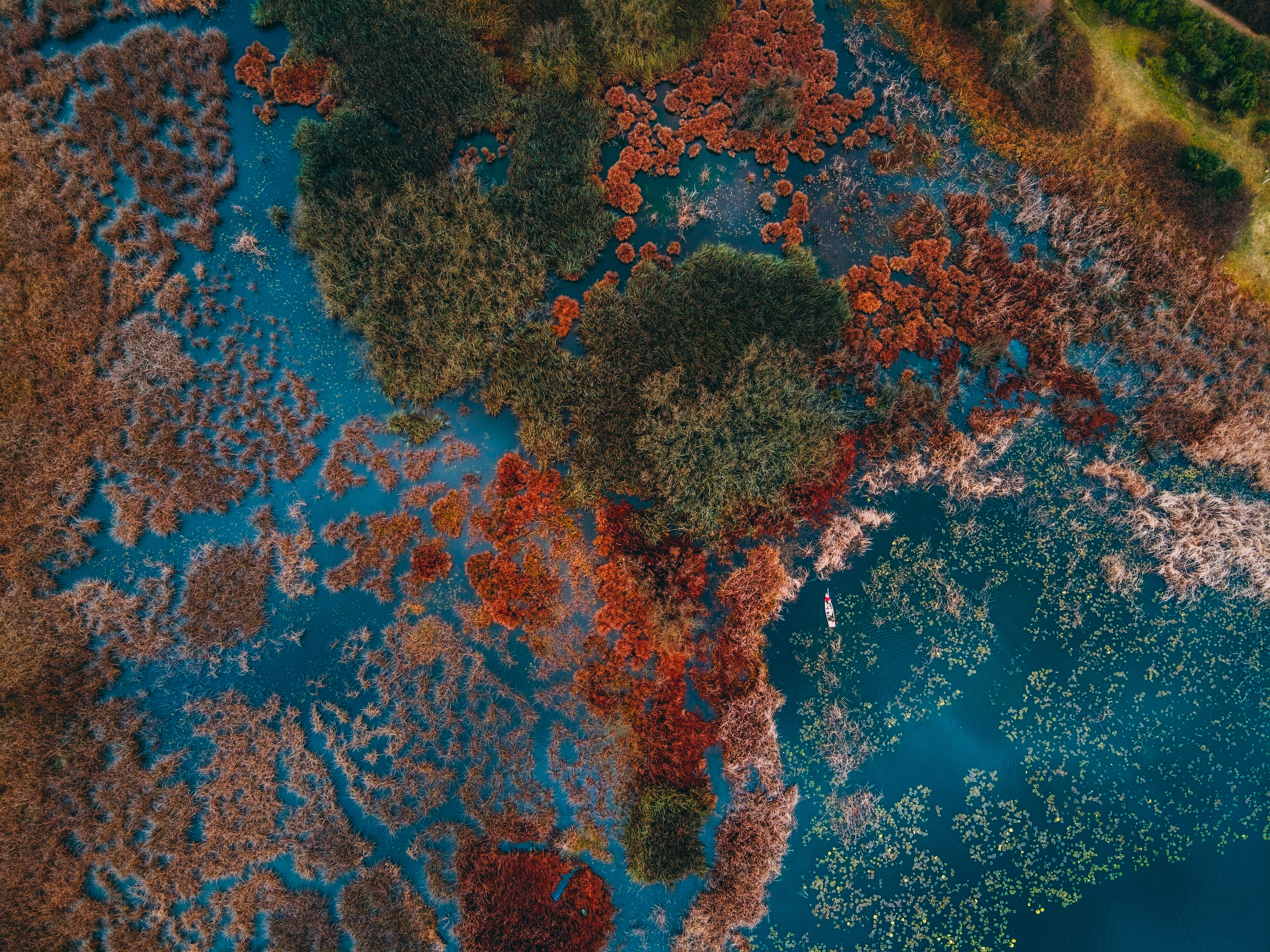
Aerial view of Lake Poyrazlar

Lake Poyrazlar Nature Park (Turkish: Poyrazlar Gölü Tabiat Parkı) is a nature park declared lake in Sakarya Province, northwestern Turkey.

Lake Poyrazlar, also known as Lake Teke, is located in Poyrazlar village, 8 km (5.0 mi) northeast of Adapazarı, north of the highway D.650 in Sakarya Province. The lake covers an area of 67 ha (170 acres) and its banks are 2.4 km (1.5 mi) long. The depth of the water varies between 3–8 m (9.8–26.2 ft).

The lake and its surroundings was declared a first-grade natural protected area in 1993 by the Council for the Protection of Cultural and Natural Heritage. In 1995, a development plan for the area was worked out, and it was officially registered. The area was leased for a lease term of five years in 2009. The area on the west bank of Lake Poyrazlar was declared a nature park in 2011 by the Ministry of Forest and Water Management.

The lake is a habitat for 153 bird species, of which 64 are resident, 36 live in winter and 47 in summer, and six stop by as migrating birds. A wide variety of butterflies can be observed during early May. Freshwater fish as food is also popular at the site.

Among other outdoor sport activities, paddling and all-terrain vehicle riding are offered in the nature park.
