= Fatih Sultan Mehmet Nature Park =

Nature park in Sarıyer, Istanbul, Turkey

- Fatih Sultan Mehmet Tabiat Parkı
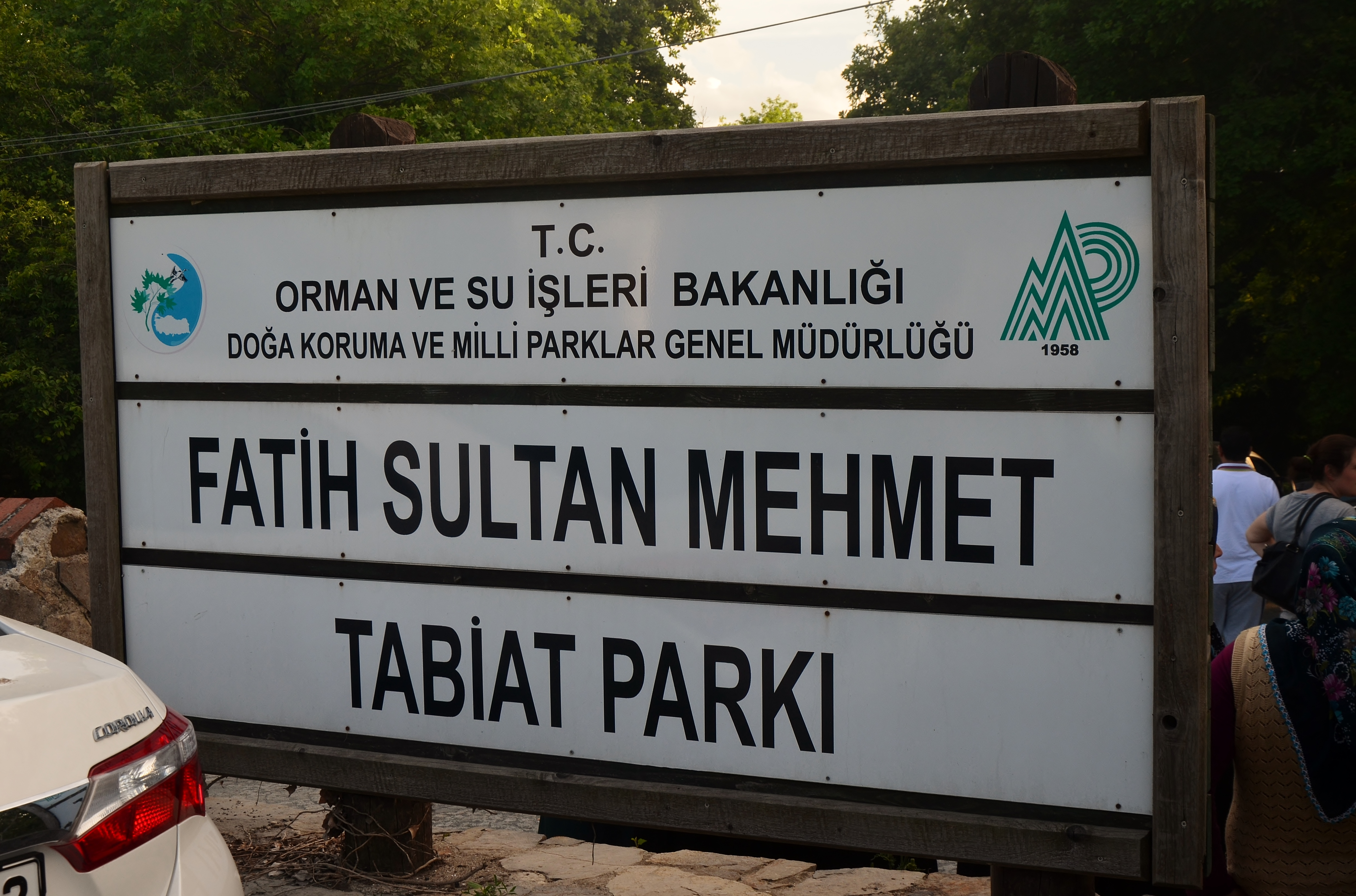

- Location within Istanbul
- Location: Bahçeköy, Sarıyer, Istanbul Province, Turkey
- Coordinates: 41°08′46″N 29°00′58″E
- Area: 111.85 ha (276.4 acres)
- Established: 2011
- Governing body: Directorate-General of Nature Protection and National Parks; Ministry of Environment and Forest

Fatih Sultan Mehmet Nature Park (Turkish: 'Fatih Sultan Mehmet Tabiat Parkı) is a nature park located in Sarıyer district of Istanbul Province, Turkey.

Fatih Sultan Mehmet Nature Park is situated southwest of Sarıyer and southeast of Belgrad Forest. It covers an area of 111.85 ha (276.4 acres). It was established in 2011 by the Ministry of Environment and Forest. The protected area is named in honor of Ottoman sultan Mehmed the Conqueror (reigned 1444–1446, 1451–1481), who conquered Istanbul in 1453.

The nature park offers outdoor recreational activities for visitors on daily basis. There are playgrounds for children. Marsh area around the pond has to be avoided for security reasons. Admission is charged for visitors and vehicles.

== Ecosystem ==
Flora

The nature park is situated inside the Fatih Forest, which has a dense middle-aged vegetation. The plants are mostly deciduous trees, however there are also coniferous trees. These are Kasnak oak (Quercus vulcanica), Turkey oak (Quercus cerris), common hornbeam (Carpinus betulus), sweet chestnut (Castanea sativa), oriental plane (Platanus orientalis), common ash (Fraxinus excelsior), blackthorn (Prunus spinosa), black pine (Pinus nigra), black pine (Pinus nigra), blackbeery (Rubus), spineless butcher's-broom (Ruscus hypoglossum), giant heather (Erica arborea), Japanese laurel (Aucuba japonica), laurestine (AViburnum tinus), Australian laurel (Pittosporum tobira) and European ivy (Hedera helix).

Fauna

The nature park is habitat for the wild life observed in the Belgrad Forest due to its location. The animals of the park are the mammals wild boar, grey wolf, jackal, fox, squirrel, mole and the bird species passer, finch, woodpecker and magpie.
