= Avcıkoru Nature Park =

Nature park in Istanbul Province, Turkey

- Avcıkoru Tabiat Parkı
- Location within Istanbul
- Location: Şile, Istanbul Province, Turkey
- Coordinates: 41°06′02″N 29°24′03″E
- Area: 648.72 ha (1,603.0 acres)
- Established: 2011
- Governing body: Directorate-General of Nature Protection and National Parks; Ministry of Environment and Forest

Avcıkoru Nature Park (Turkish: Avcıkoru Tabiat Parkı) is a nature park located in Şile district of Istanbul Province, Turkey.

Avcıkoru Nature Park is situated north of Ömerli Dam on the highway D.020. The area was declared a nature park by the Ministry of Environment and Forest in 2011. It covers an area of about 648.72 ha (1,603.0 acres). The protected area is named after the village close to it. In the northwest of the nature park, there is an artificial pond formed by flooding of a mine pit.

Avcıkoru Nature Park offers outdoor recreational activities on daily basis such as hiking and picnicing. It features an outdoor cafeteria and cottages for lodging.

== Ecosystem ==
Flora

The vegetation of the nature park are mostly wide-leaved trees. Some plants are pedunculate oak (Quercus robur), sessile oak (Quercus petraea), sweet chestnut (Castanea sativa), oriental beech (Fagus orientalis) and hornbeam (Carpinus betulus).

Fauna

Animals observed in the park area are the mammals roe deer, wild boar, squirrel, jackal, fox, marten and the bird species goldfinch, serinus, magpie, passer, common blackbird, hawk and common buzzard.
