= Kuyuluk Nature Park =

Nature park in Fındıkpınarı, Mersin, Turkey

- Kuyuluk Tabiat Parkı
- Location within Turkey
- Location: Fındıkpınarı yolu, Mersin, Turkey
- Coordinates: 36°46′25″N 34°28′51″E
- Area: 19.83 ha (49.0 acres)
- Established: 2011; 15 years ago
- Governing body: Directorate-General of Nature Protection and National Parks; Ministry of Environment and Forest

Kuyuluk Nature Park is a nature park in Turkey.

The park is in the Mezitli second level municipality of Mersin at 36°46′25″N 34°28′51″E. It is situated on the road to Fındıkpınarı in the southern slopes of the Toros Mountains. Its distance to Mersin is only 25 kilometres (16 mi). It was declared a picnic area in 1984 and a nature park in 2011.

The area of the nature park is 19.83 hectares (49.0 acres). It is surrounded by Turkish pine (Pinus brutia) and Mediterranean type scrub.
