= Büyükada Nature Park =

Nature park in Büyükada, Istanbul, Turkey

- Büyükada Tabiat Parkı
- Location within Istanbul
- Location: Büyükada, Adalar, Istanbul Province, Turkey
- Nearest city: Büyükada
- Coordinates: 40°50′56″N 29°07′23″E
- Area: 4.45 ha (11.0 acres)
- Established: 2011
- Governing body: Directorate-General of Nature Protection and National Parks; Ministry of Environment and Forest

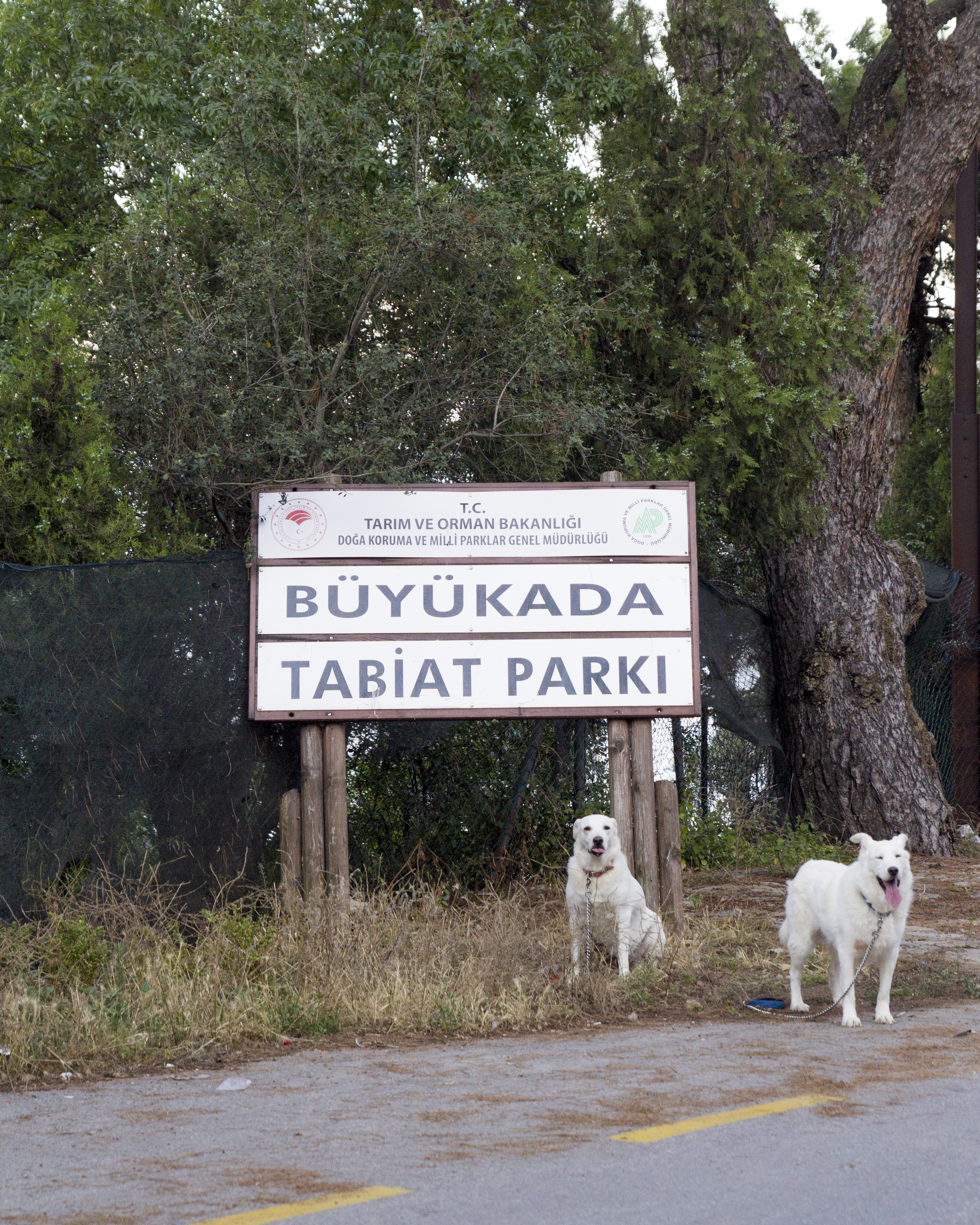
Photo of the entrance of the park

Büyükada Nature Park (Turkish: Büyükada Tabiat Parkı) is a nature park in Istanbul Province, Turkey.

Büyükada (literally: Big Island) is the biggest of the Princes' Islands, a group of nine islands in the Sea of Marmara, in Adalar district southeast of Istanbul Province. An area east of the island was declared a nature park by the Ministry of Environment and Forest in 2011. It covers an area of about 4.45 ha (11.0 acres).

== See also ==
- Dilburnu Nature Park, on the western part of Büyükada
- Değirmenburnu Nature Park, on the neighboring island Heybeliada
