= Değirmenburnu Nature Park =

Nature park in Heybeliada, Istanbul, Turkey

- Değirmenburnu Tabiat Parkı
- Location within Istanbul
- Location: Heybeliada, Adalar, Istanbul Province, Turkey
- Nearest city: Heybeliada
- Coordinates: 40°53′02″N 29°05′37″E
- Area: 12.28 ha (30.3 acres)
- Established: 2011
- Governing body: Directorate-General of Nature Protection and National Parks; Ministry of Environment and Forest

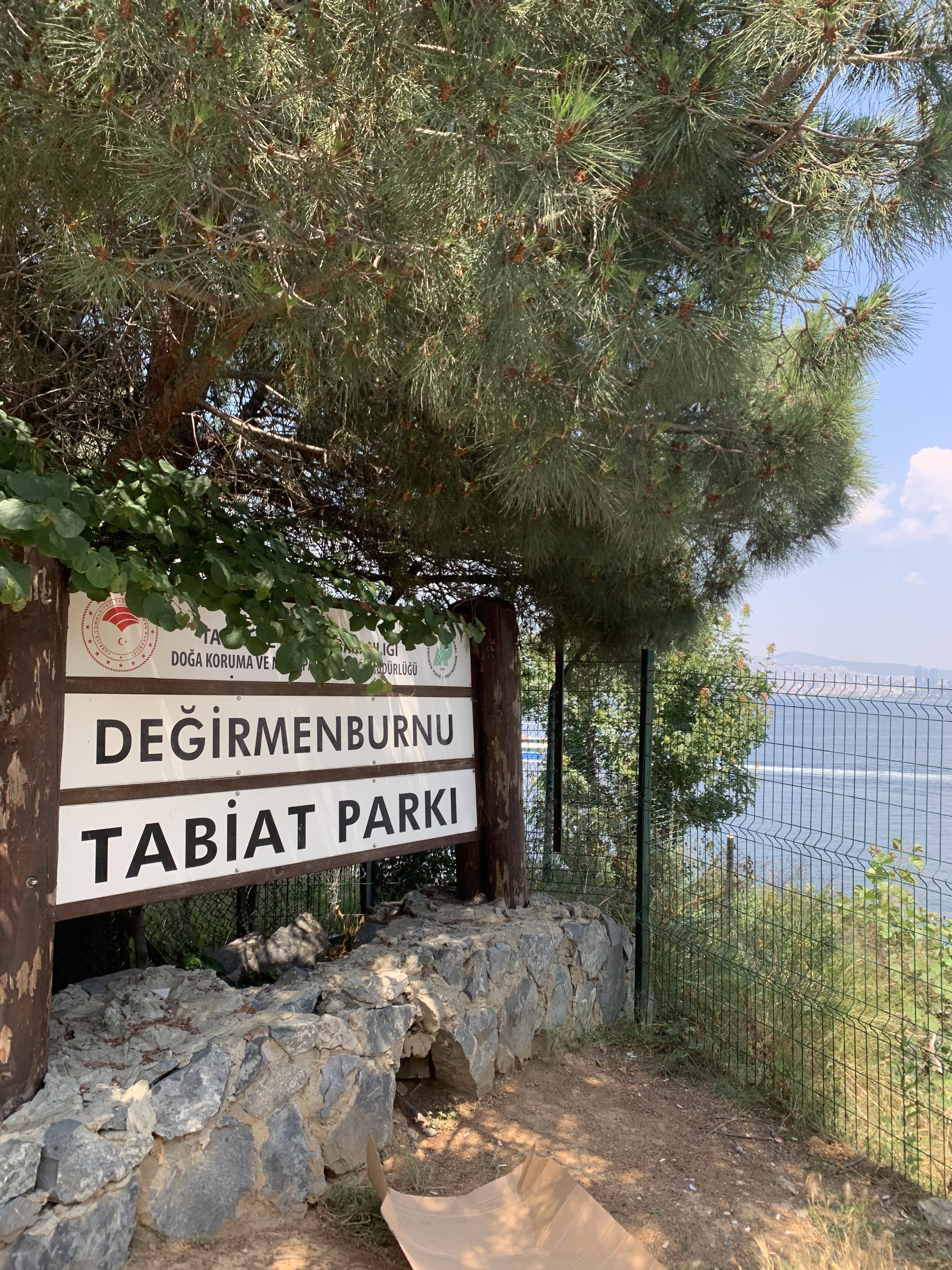
Değirmenburnu Nature Park

Değirmenburnu Nature Park (Turkish: Değirmenburnu Tabiat Parkı) is a nature park in Istanbul Province, Turkey.

== Nature park ==
Değirmenburnu (literally "Cape Mill") is situated north of Heybeliada in Adalar district southeast of Istanbul Province. Heybeliada is the second biggest of the Princes' Islands, a group of nine islands in the Sea of Marmara. An area north of the island was declared a nature park by the Ministry of Environment and Forest in 2011. It covers an area of about 12.28 ha (30.3 acres).

In addition to outdoor activity of hiking and swimming, the nature park offers phaeton riding and bike rental on daily basis. There is an outdoor coffeehouse in the park.

Historic buildings such as the Heybeliada Sanatorium, the Eastern Orthodox Church Theological School of Halki and a mill are interesting sites in the park area to visit.

The island is accessible by passenger ferries from Kabataş at 20 km (12 mi; 11 nmi), from Bostancı at 10 km (6.2 mi; 5.4 nmi) and from Kartal at 6.5 km (4.0 mi; 3.5 nmi) distance.

== Climate ==
The area's climate is also effected by Mediterranean climate. Summers are hot and dry, winters are mild and rainy. The temperature difference between night and day is little. Dominnat wind direction is northwest. The winds are effective in the year around, and strong winds blow in the northwest direction in February and June. The lowest temperature observed in terms of seasonal temperatures is 4.3 °C (39.7 °F) in February, and the highest temperature being 31 °C (88 °F) in July. Relative humidity does not fall below 70% even in June or July.

== Ecosysten ==
Flora

The flora of the nature park mainly consists of Turkish pine (Pinus brutia), stone pine (Pinus pinea), maritime pine (Pinus pinaster), blackthorn (Prunus spinosa), bay laurel (Laurus nobilis), Mediterranean cypress (Cupressus sempervirens), southern magnolia (Magnolia grandiflora), Atlas cedar (Cedrus atlantica), Loquat (Eriobotrya japonica), Mediterranean hackberry (Celtis australis), Judas tree (Cercis siliquastrum), pink rock-rose (Cistus creticus), pink rock-rose (Cistus creticus), Spanish broom (Spartium junceum), common ivy (Hedera helix), Chinese photinia (Photinia serratifolia) and Sally-my-handsome (Carpobrotus acinaciformis).

Fauna

Animals observed in the nature park are the mammals squirrel, porcupine, hare, mole and the bird species magpie, passer and crow.

== See also ==
- Büyükada Nature Park, on the eastern part of the neighboring island Büyükada
- Dilburnu Nature Park, on the western part of Büyükada
