= Polonezköy Nature Park =

Nature park in Polonezköy, Istanbul, Turkey

- Polonezköy Tabiat Parkı
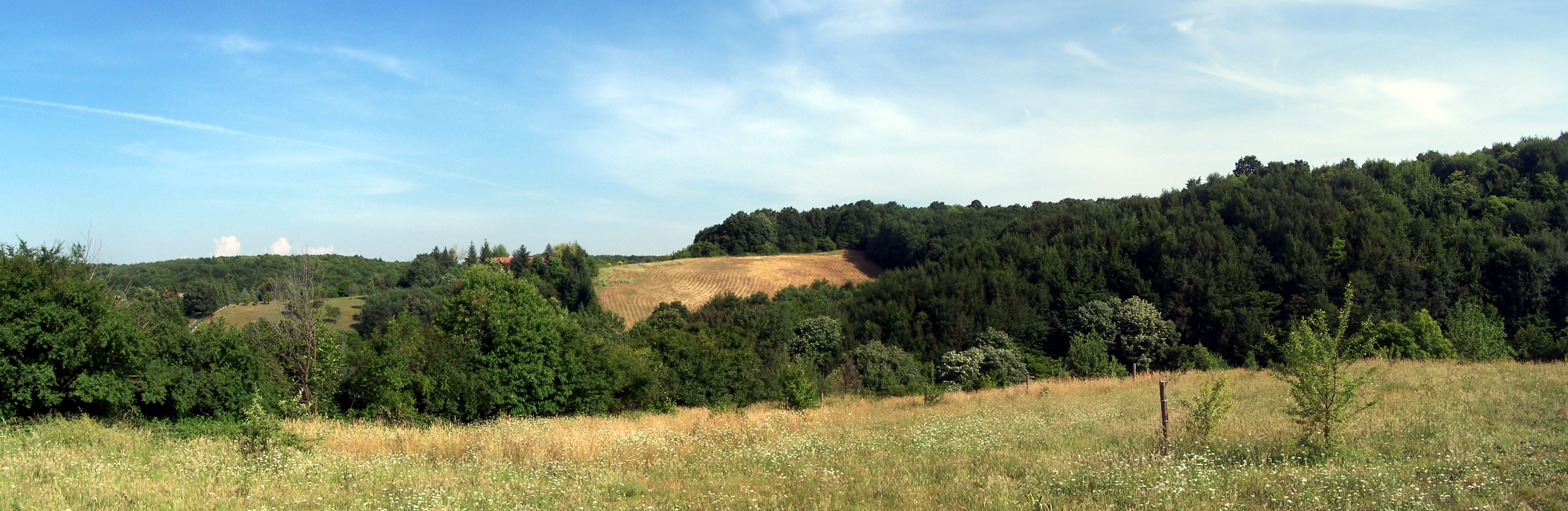
- A view of the Polonezköy landscape.

- Location within Istanbul
- Location: Polonezköy, Beykoz, Istanbul
- Coordinates: 41°07′04″N 29°12′37″E
- Area: 3,004 ha (7,420 acres)
- Established: 1994
- Governing body: Ministry of Environment and Forests; Directorate-General of Nature Protection and National Parks

Polonezköy Nature Park (Turkish: Polonezköy Tabiat Parkı) is a nature park in the village of Polonezköy in Istanbul, Turkey.

Polonezköy is situated in the Beykoz district of Istanbul Province. The area was declared a nature park by the Ministry of Environment and Forests in 1994. It covers an area of about 3,004 ha (7,420 acres). It is the province's first, and in terms of area, largest, nature park. The protected area is named after the village of Polonezköy, which was settled in 1842 by a small group of Polish emigrants, after the failed November Uprising. The settlement was initially named "Adamköy" or "Adampol" (literally Adamville) in honor of Adam Jerzy Czartoryski, and was renamed later to "Polonez Karyesi". In 1923, it was changed to its current official name.

The nature park offers many outdoor recreational activities such as picnicking, camping, trekking and orienteering. There is a 5 km (3.1 mi)-long hiking, cycling, and jogging course, as well as observation towers. There are also a number of restaurants. Lodging is available in a number of boarding houses and hotels in the village.

== Ecosystem ==
=== Flora ===
The nature park has a very rich variety of vegetation. Common plants include black pine (Pinus nigra), Turkish pine (Pinus brutia), Scots pine (Pinus sylvestris), pedunculate oak (Quercus robur), sessile oak (Quercus petraea), Turkey oak (Quercus cerris), Hungarian oak (Quercus frainetto), horse-chestnut (Aesculus hippocastanum), sweet chestnut (Castanea sativa), Norway spruce (Picea abies), oriental plane (Platanus orientalis), Mediterranean cypress (Cupressus sempervirens), common hornbeam (Carpinus betulus), Scots elm (Ulmus glabra), alder (Alnus orientalis), oriental beech (Fagus orientalis), silver linden (Tilia tomentosa), oriental arborvitae (Platycladus orientalis), Smilax (Smilax excelsa), bay laurel (Laurus nobilis), strawberry tree (Arbutus unedo), common laurel (Laurocerasus officinalis), cotoneaster (Cotoneaster horizontalis), common hawthorn (Crataegus monogyna), scarlet firethorn (Pyracantha coccinea), giant heather (Erica arborea) and guelder-rose (Viburnum opulus).

=== Fauna ===
There is a pheasant farm and a deer farm inside the nature park. Wild animals observed in the protected area include mammals like red deer, roe deer, wild boars, jackals, squirrels, martens, weasels, and the bird species of pheasant, partridge, hawk, buzzard, falcon, eurasian blackbird, European goldfinch, common wood pigeon, owl, magpie and sparrow.
