= Harmankaya Nature Park =

Nature park in Turkey

- Harmankaya Tabiat Parkı
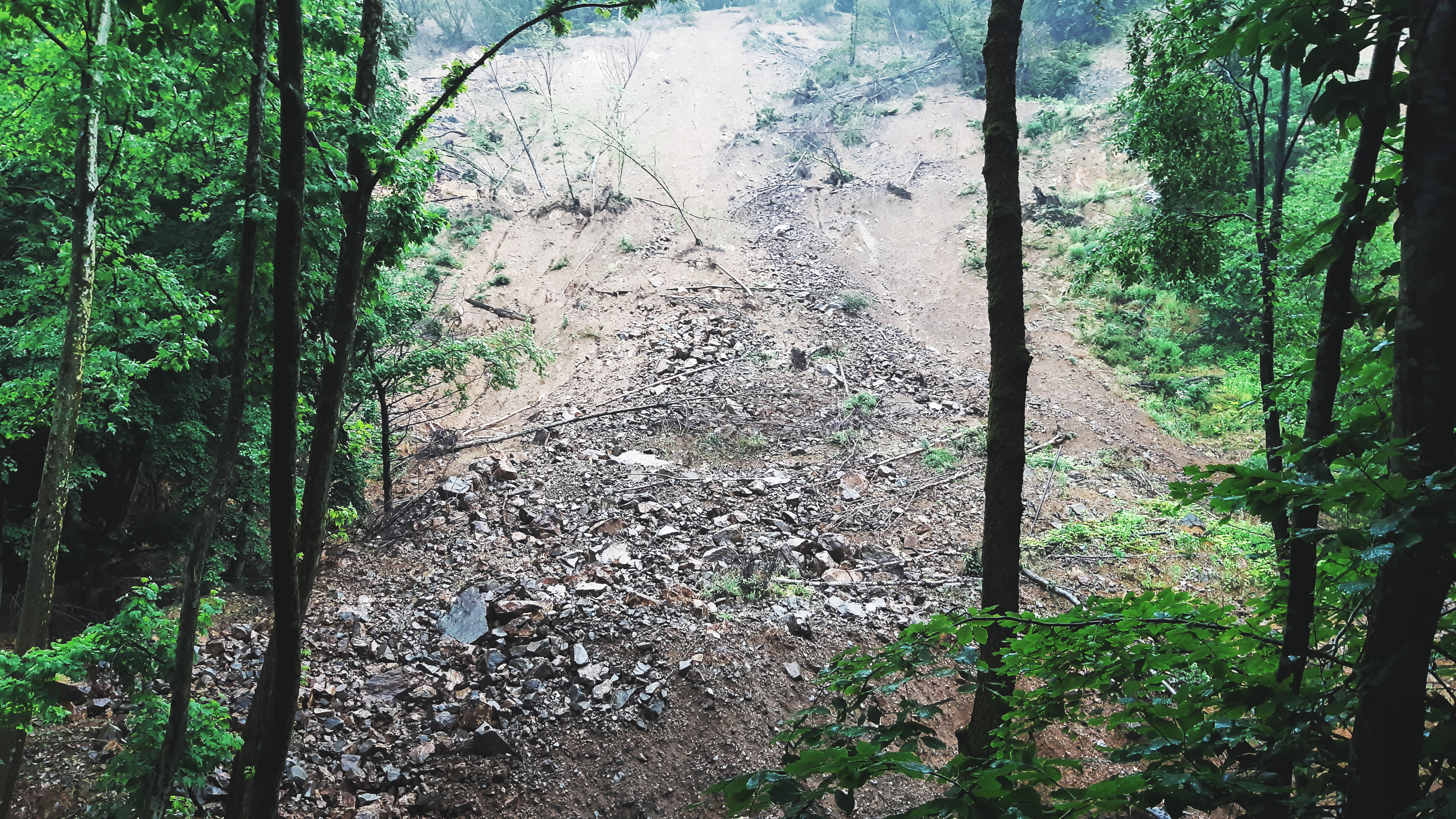
- A photo showing the damage caused by road work in Harmankaya Nature Park.

- Location within Turkey
- Location: Termal, Yalova Province, Turkey
- Coordinates: 40°34′32″N 29°08′59″E
- Area: 1 ha (2.5 acres)
- Established: July 11, 2011; 14 years ago
- Governing body: Directorate-General of Nature Protection and National Parks; Ministry of Environment and Forest

Harmankaya Nature Park (Turkish: Harmankaya Tabiat Parkı) is a nature park located in Termal district of Yalova Province, northwestern Turkey.

Harmanlı Nature Park is located 18 km (11 mi) to Yalova, 6 km (3.7 mi) to Termal and 5 km (3.1 mi) to Üvezpınar village, and situated south of Termal district on the road between Üvezpınar and Sudüşen Waterfall close to the provincial border to Bursa. The area covering 1 ha (2.5 acres), which formerly had a registered recreational area status, was declared a nature park by the Ministry of Environment and Forest on July 11, 2011.

== Ecosystem ==
Flora

The protected area is covered mainly by beech (Fagus orientalis). Other flora of the park are the trees silver linden (Tilia argentea), sweet chestnut (Castanea sativa), common hornbeam (Carpinus betulus), Hungarian oak (Quercus frainetto), sessile oak (Quercus petraea) and Turkey oak (Quercus cerris), as well as the flowering plants greater snowdrop (Galanthus elwesii), toothpickweed (Ammi visnaga), Italian arum (Arum italicum), bellflower (Campanula lyrata), peach-leaved bellflower (Campanula persicifolia), bladder campion (Silene vulgaris), leafy goosefoot (Chenopodium foliosum), nettle-leaved goosefoot (Chenopodium murale), charlock mustard (Sinapis arvensis), whitetop (Lepidium draba), stinkwort (Inula graveolens), coltsfoot (Tussilago farfara), golden marguerite (Anthemis tinctoria), common wormwood (Artemisia vulgaris), spear thistle (Cirsium vulgare), musk thistle (Carduus nutans), yellow star-thistle (Centaurea solstitialis) and many others.

Fauna

Observed fauna are the mammals gray wolf, jackal, fox, wild boar, the amphibian frog, the reptiles tortoise, lizard, snake and some bird and songbird species.
