= Sorgun Dam =

- Location: Isparta Province, Turkey
- Coordinates: 37.8361°N 31.1025°E

Sorgun Dam is a dam in Isparta Province, Turkey. The development was backed by the Turkish State Hydraulic Works.

== See also ==
- List of dams and reservoirs in Turkey
