= Hacınuhlu =

- Neighbourhood
- Location in Turkey
- Coordinates: 36°41′N 33°29′E
- Country: Turkey
- Province: Mersin
- District: Mut
- Elevation: 565 m (1,854 ft)
- Population (2022): 372
- Time zone: UTC+3 (TRT)
- Postal code: 33600
- Area code: 0324

Hacınuhlu is a neighbourhood in the municipality and district of Mut, Mersin Province, Turkey. Its population is 372 (2022). It is situated in the slopes of Toros Mountains facing the Göksu River valley. Its distance to Mut is 10 km (6.2 mi) and to Mersin is 170 km (110 mi). Olive is the main product of the village.
