= Erdemli Pine Groove =

Nature park in Erdemli, Mersin, Turkey

Erdemli Pine Groove is a nature park in Turkey. It is also called "Talat Göktepe Groove" to commemorate Talat Göktepe a former director of Forestry in Çanakkale who died while fighting against forest fire in 1994. It is located at 36°35′28″N 34°17′10″E to the west of Erdemli ilçe (district) of Mersin Province. It lies between the Turkish state highway D.400 and the Mediterranean Sea coast.

It was declared a picnic place in 1962 and a nature park in 2011.

The length of the grove is about 3 kilometres (1.9 mi) in northeast to southwest direction. Its width is about 500 metres (1,600 ft). The total area is 26.14 hectares (64.6 acres). The coastal part is a sandy beach. There are some sand dunes on the beach. The back part is a groove. Most of the trees are Turkish pine (Pinus brutia), Umbrella pine (Sciadopitys) and myrtle (Myrtus).
