= 100th Anniversary (Gümüşkum) Nature Park =

Nature park in Mezitli, Mersin, Turkey

- 100. Yıl (Gümüşkum) Tabiat Parkı
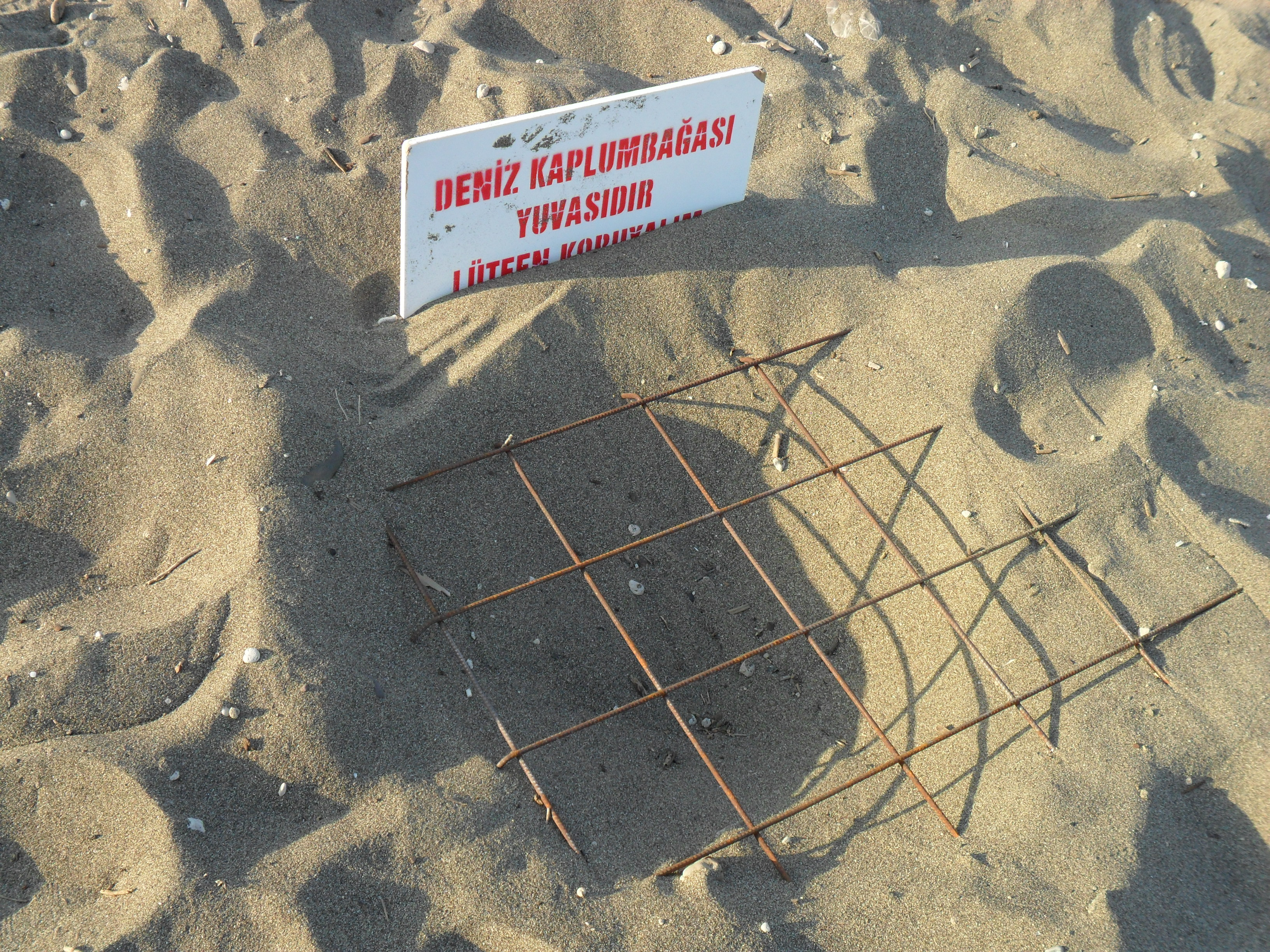
- A sea turtle spawning place in Gümüşkum

- Location within Turkey
- Location: Mezitli, Mersin, Turkey
- Coordinates: 36°43′15″N 34°29′43″E
- Area: 22.98 ha (56.8 acres)
- Established: July 11, 2011; 15 years ago
- Governing body: Directorate-General of Nature Protection and National Parks; Ministry of Environment and Forest

100th Anniversary (Gümüşkum) Nature Park (Turkish: 100. Yıl (Gümüşkum) Tabiat Parkı) is a coastal nature park in Mersin, Turkey.

The park at 36°43′15″N 34°29′43″E is in Davultepe town, which merged to Mersin urban fabric. It is located on the Mediterranean Sea coast covering an area of 22.98 hectares (56.8 acres). It is on the Mersin-Silifke highway D.400 12 km (7.5 mi) southwest of Mersin. In 1977, the grove at the Mediterranean Sea side was declared a recreation area. On July 11, 2011, the area was declared a nature park by the Ministry of Environment and Forest. However the ministry decided to end its status as a nature park and there is a heated discussion on its future status

It has a 1.8 km (1.1 mi) long sandy beach. "Gümüşkum" means literally "Silver sand". The nature park offers outdoor recreational activities for visitors on a daily basis such as hiking, swimming and picnicing. Camping and renting of cottages or bungalows are also available.

The trees in the park are Turkish pine (Pinus brutia) and eucalyptus. The endemic plant sea daffodil (Pancratium maritimum) is endangered. A section of the sandy beach in the nature park is used by green sea turtles (Chelonia mydas) and loggerhead sea turtles (Caretta caretta) for ovulation. A treatment and rehabilitation center for the sea turtles is situated inside the nature park.

The status of the protected area as "nature park" was revoked on July 14, 2015. It was decided to decrease its status to "recreation area of grade A". Upon protests of the residents of Mersin to protect and conserve the sea turtles, the Ministry cancelled its decision within about one month, and the status of the protected area remained unchanged.
