= Torba, Bodrum =

Torba
- Neighbourhood
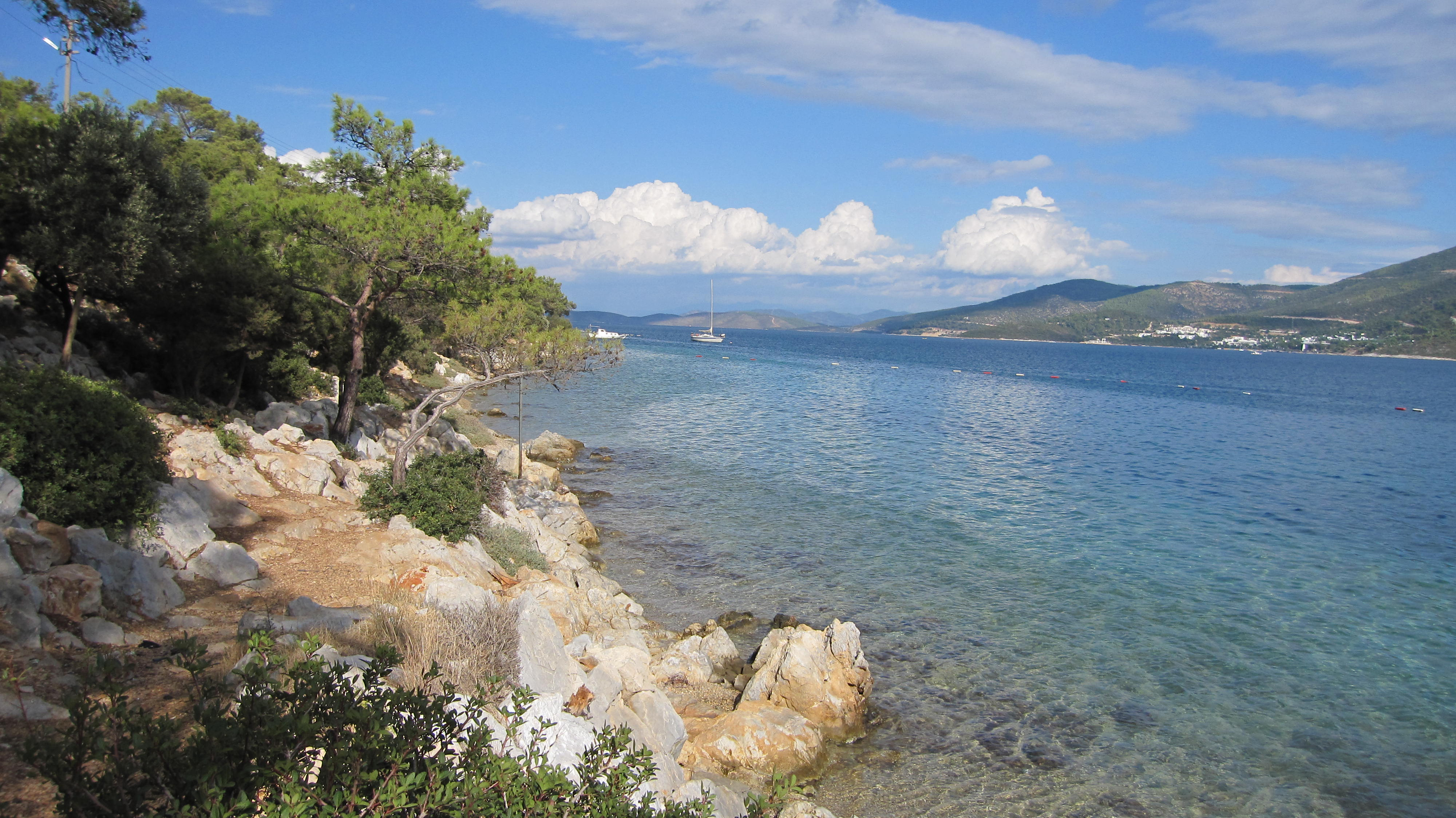

- Location within Turkey Location within Turkey Aegean
- Coordinates: 37°04′28″N 27°27′33″E
- Country: Turkey
- Province: Muğla
- District: Bodrum
- Population (2022): 2,671
- Time zone: UTC+3 (TRT)

Torba is a neighbourhood of the municipality and district of Bodrum, Muğla Province, Turkey. Its population is 2,671 (2022).

Torba is a sea-side village located approximately 6 km (3.7 mi) northeast of the resort town, Bodrum. The hillsides are clad in olive groves and pine forests. The shoreline is dotted with cafes and open-air restaurants, specializing in catch-of-the-day seafood, lamb kebabs and traditional mezes (Turkish tapas). Despite some recent upmarket developments, the village has retained a relaxed, rural ambience. Because of its close proximity to Bodrum town, Torba is popular with day-trippers who come for a swim, a stroll along the idyllic shoreline or a candle-lit dinner on the beach. Hotels and all-inclusive resorts are there as well.

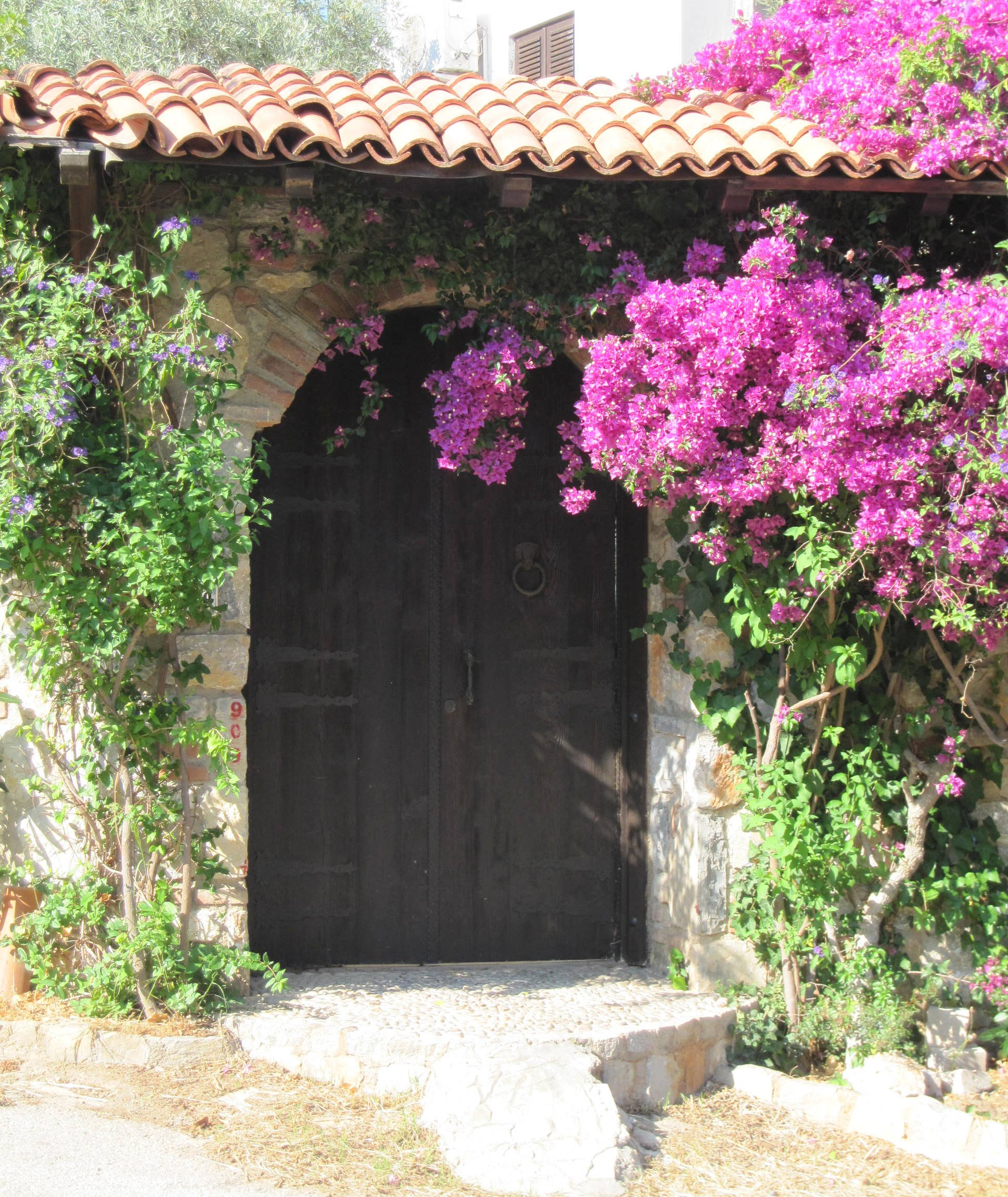
Entrance to a villa in Torba

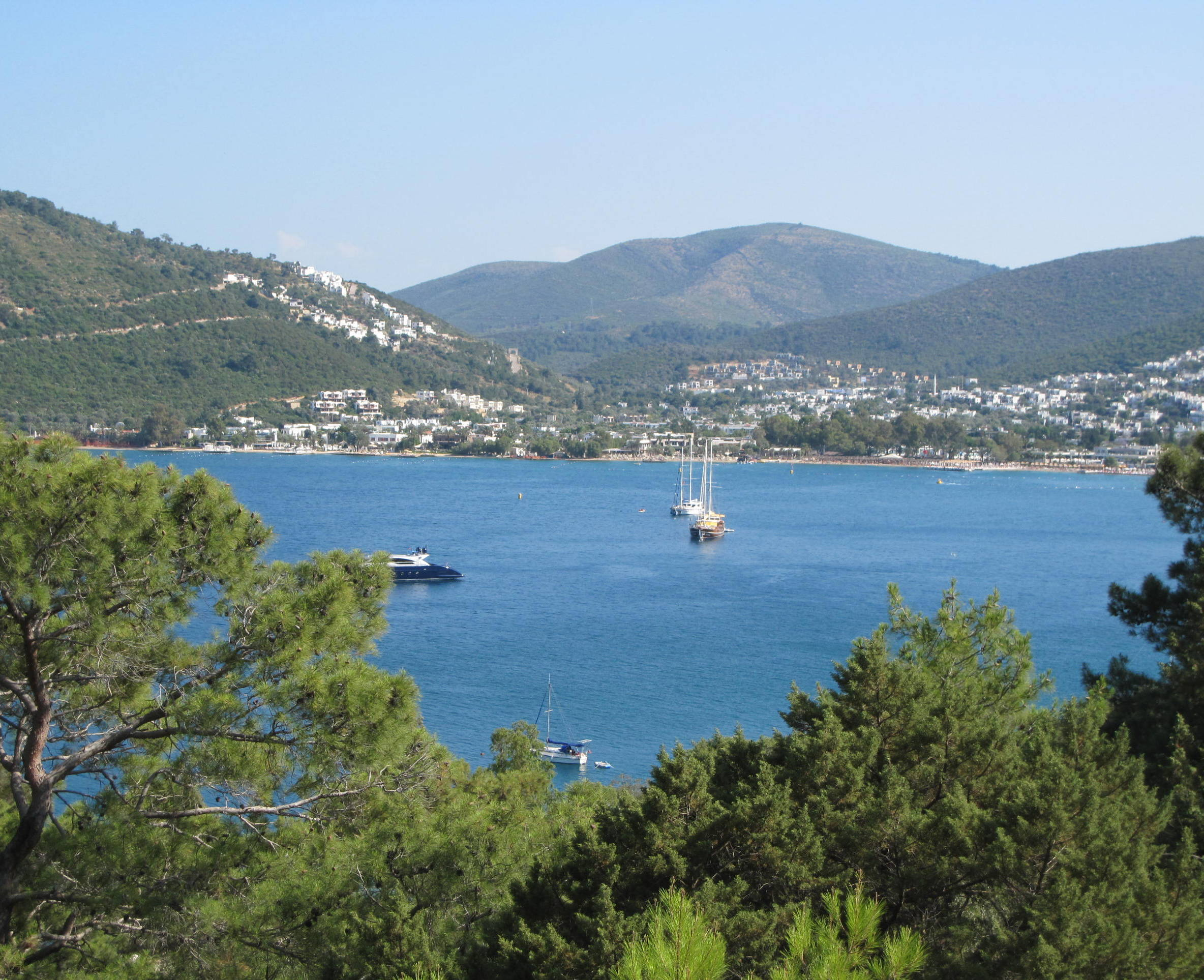
Torba Bay

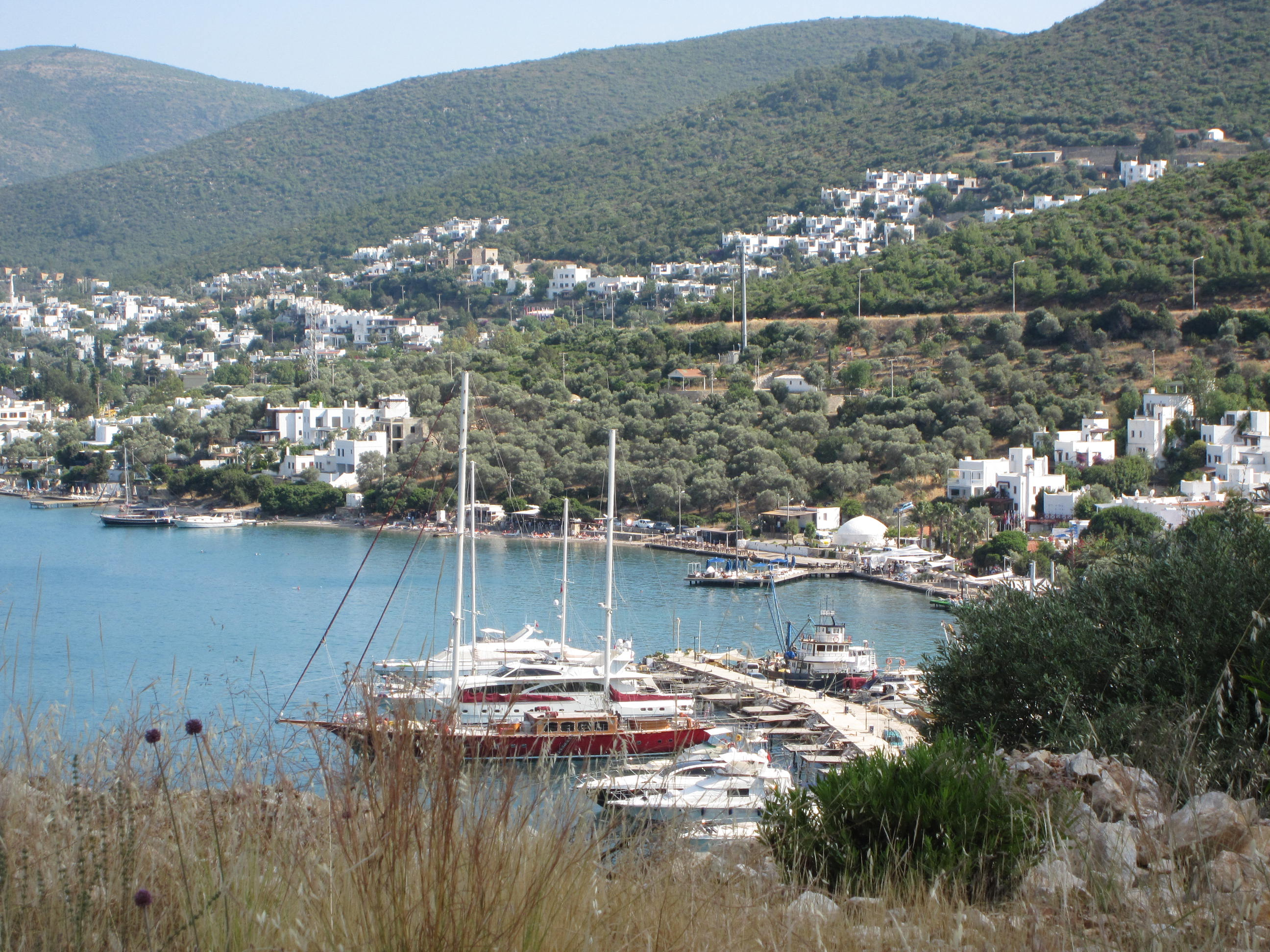
Torba's marina

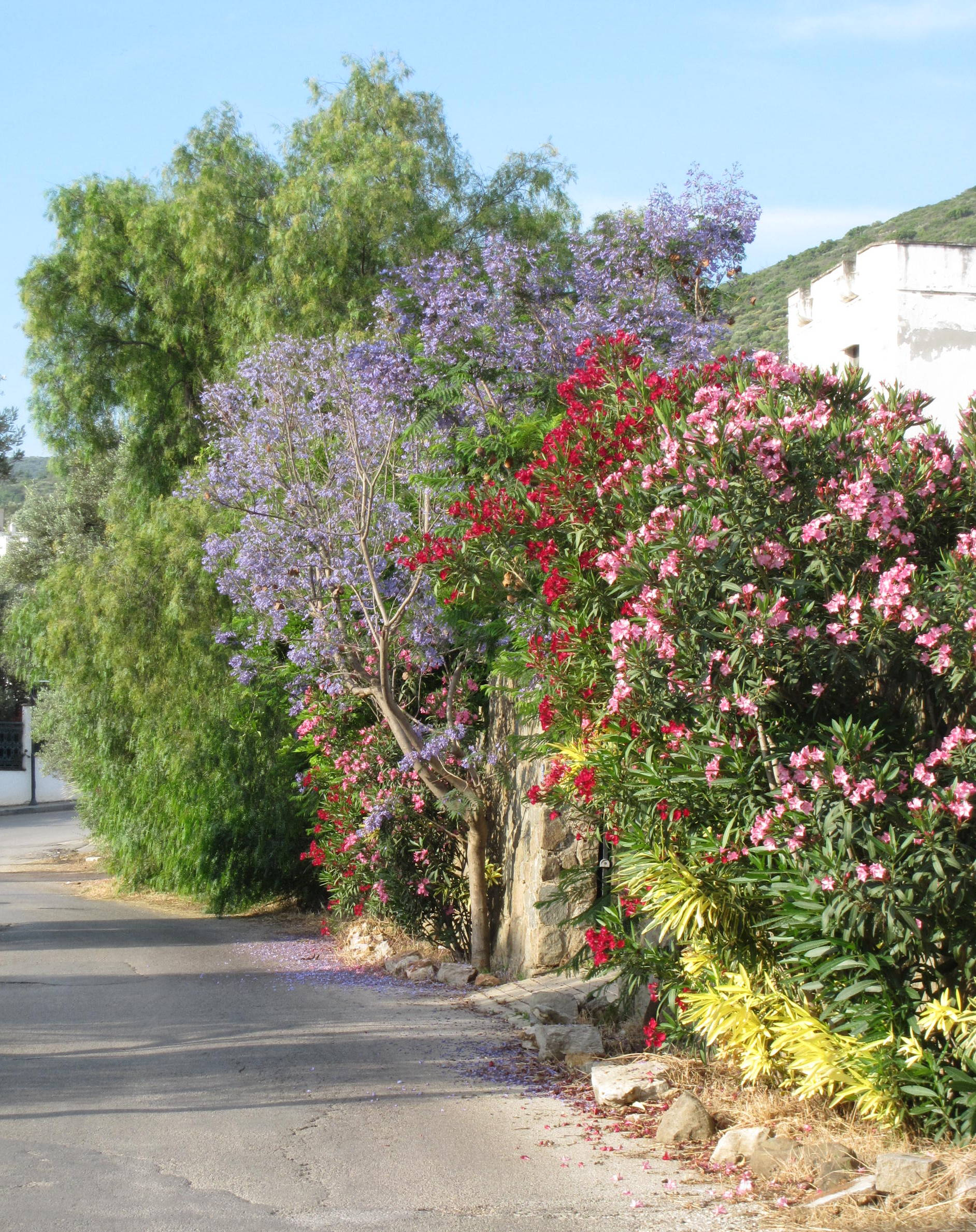
Village street

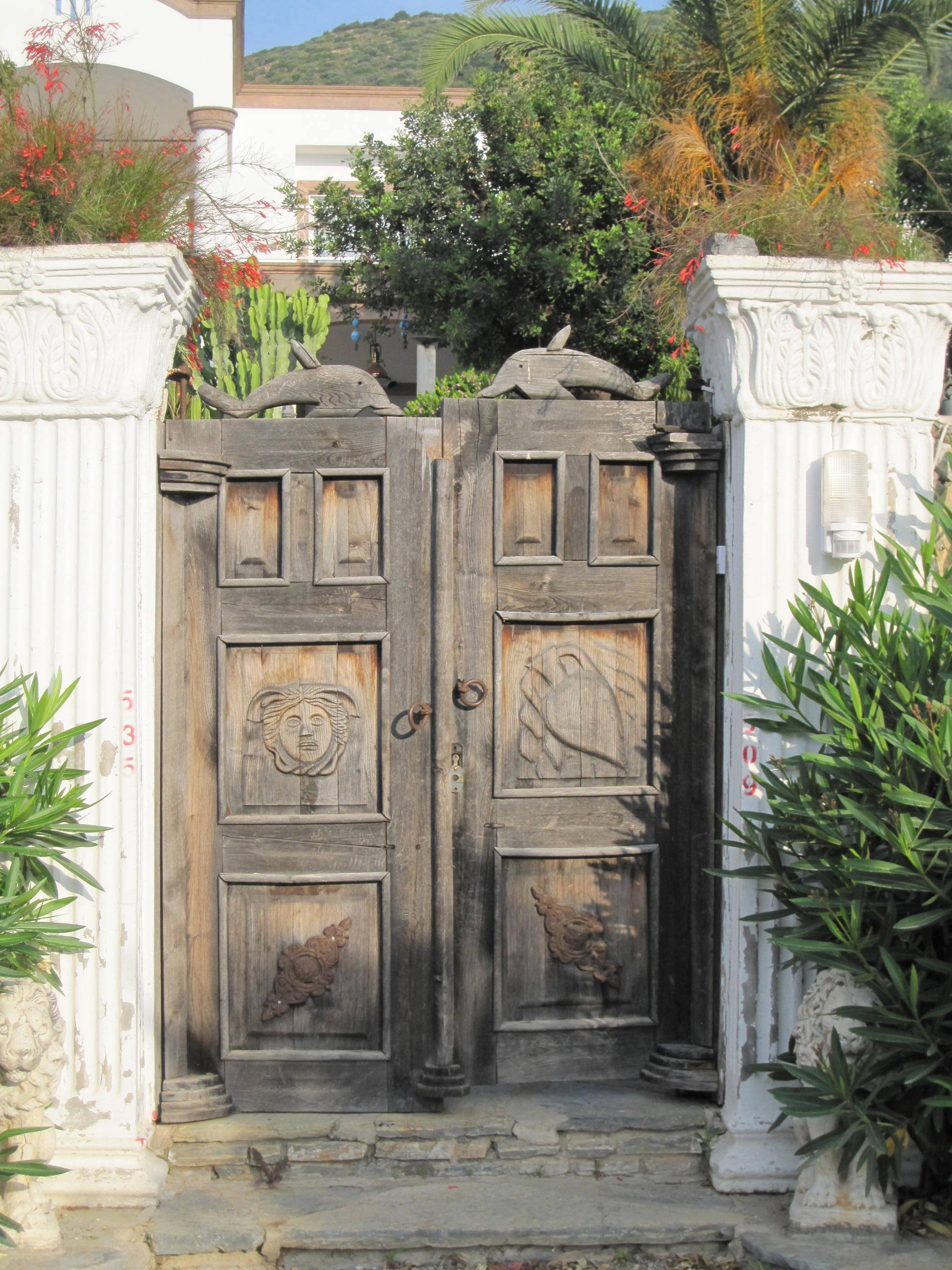
Entrance to another Torba villa

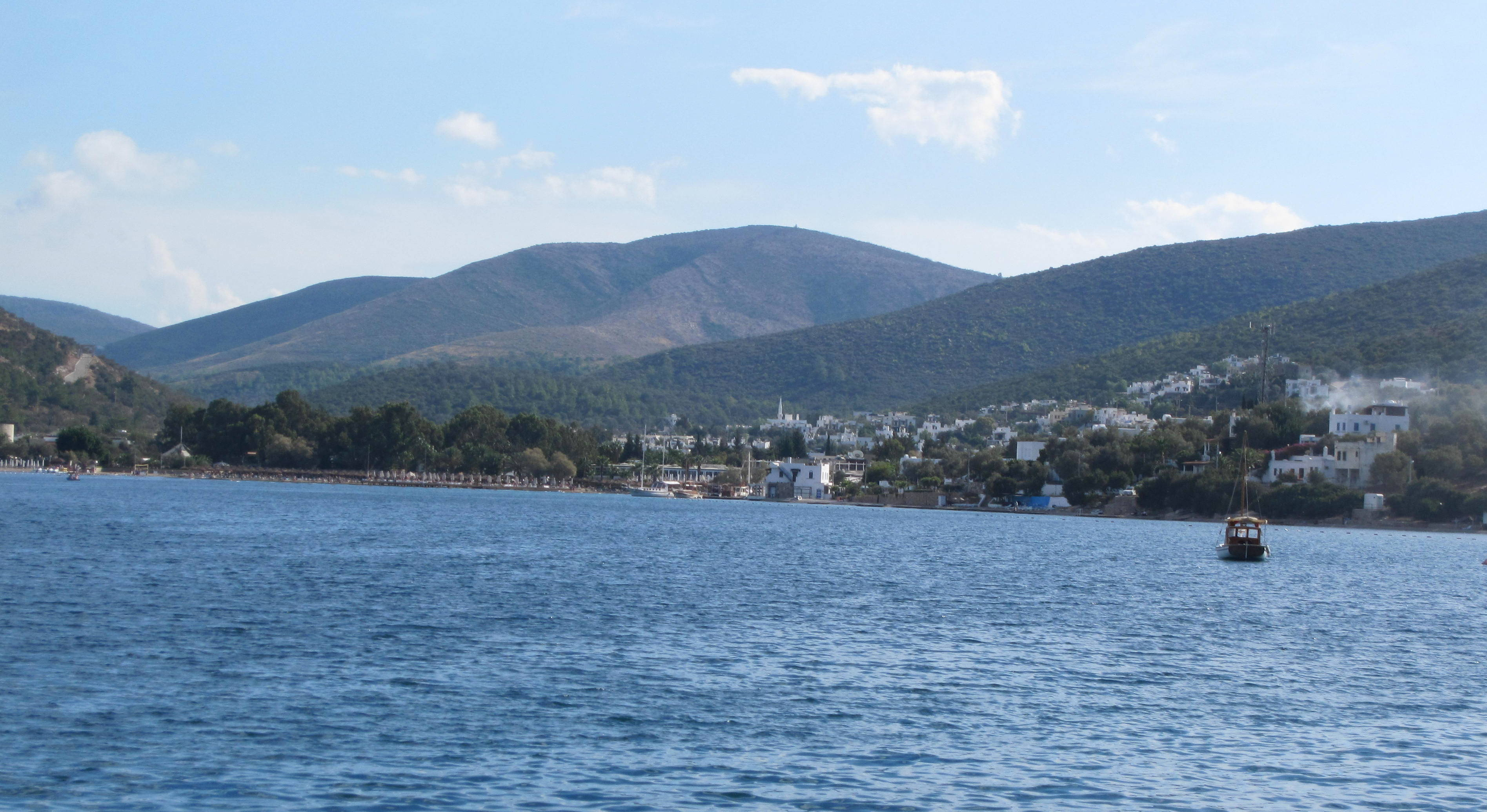
Torba village view

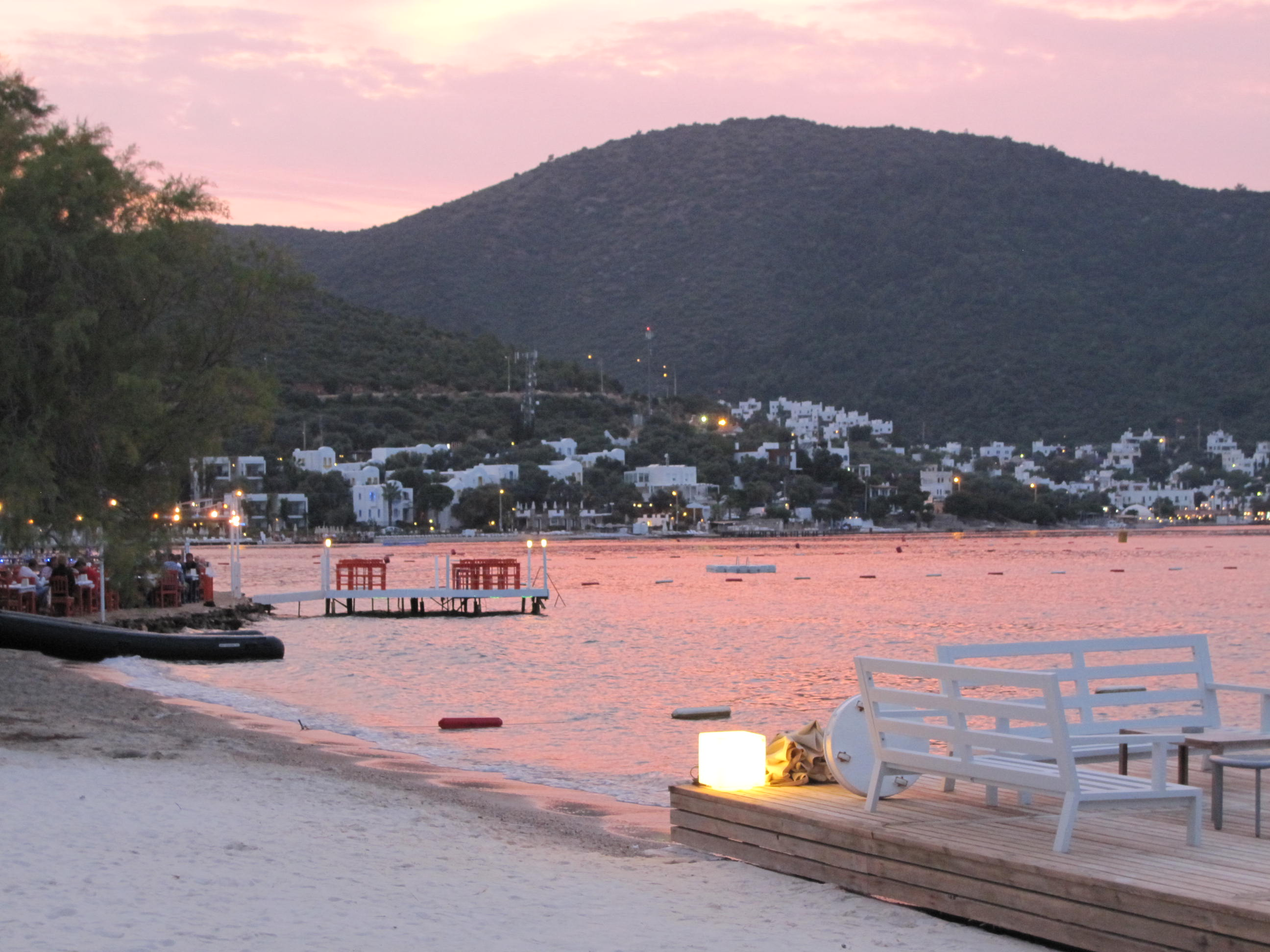
Torba Bay at dusk

Some of the fish in Torba Bay include sea bass and gilt-head bream. Other marine life include sea turtles, dolphins or the rare Mediterranean monk seal.
