= AgroEurasia =

Agricultural exhibition in Eurasia

The AgroEurasia International Agriculture Fair (Turkish: Avrasya Tarim) is one of the largest agricultural exhibitions in Eurasia. Since 2006, it has been held in December in the Tuyap Fair and Congress Center in Istanbul, Turkey. With an exhibition area of roughly 40,000 square metres (430,000 sq ft), an average of 350 company and company representatives participating and over 45,000 visitors from about 40 countries, it is a meeting place for the Eurasian agricultural sector. In 2011, over 3,000 international visitors from 34 countries attended: Afghanistan, Albania, Azerbaijan, Belarus, Bosnia Herzegovina, Bulgaria, Canada, Croatia, Denmark, Finland, France, Georgia, Greece, Hungary, Iraq, Iran, Israel, Kazakhstan, Kyrgyzstan, Kosovo, Libya, Macedonia, Moldova, Russia, Sudan, Saudi Arabia, Syria, Tajikistan, Turkmenistan, Ukraine, and Uzbekistan.

The exhibition is organised by TÜYAP Fairs and Exhibitions Inc. in cooperation with the Turkish Ministry of Agriculture, the Union of Turkish Chambers of Agriculture, and the Turkish Association of Agricultural Machinery Manufacturers (TARMAKBİR). The fair is supported by the İstanbul Directorate of Urban Agriculture, the Union of İstanbul Chambers of Agriculture and the Oilseeds & Agricultural Sales Cooperatives Union of Thrace.
