= Ministry of Agriculture and Forestry (Turkey) =

Government ministry of Turkey

- Tarım ve Orman Bakanlığı

Agency overview
- Formed: 1924; 102 years ago
- Preceding agencies: Ministry of Food, Agriculture and Livestock; Ministry of Forestry and Water Management
- Jurisdiction: Government of Turkey
- Headquarters: Ankara
- Minister responsible: İbrahim Yumaklı
- Deputy Ministers responsible: Ebubekir Gizligider; Veysel Tiryaki; Ahmet Bağcı; Ahmet Gümen
- Website: www.tarimorman.gov.tr

The Ministry of Agriculture and Forestry (Turkish: Tarım ve Orman Bakanlığı) is a government ministry of the Republic of Turkey, responsible for agriculture and forestry.

== General Directorate of Forestry ==
It is responsible for forests in Turkey. This includes reforestation efforts, which are important to combat climate change in Turkey.

== See also ==
- AgroEurasia
- List of agriculture ministries
