= List of tunnels in Turkey =

This incomplete list of tunnels in Turkey includes any road, rail, or waterway tunnel in Turkey. Tunnels are listed in decreasing order of their length.

== Road tunnels ==
- Trabzon (Maçka) - Gümüşhane (Torul), New Zigana Tunnel – 14,448 m left, 14,477 m right
- Rize (İkizdere) - Erzurum (İspir), Ovit Tunnel – 2 x 14,346 m
- Giresun, Dereli-Şebinkarahisar, Eğribel Tunnel – 2 x 5,900 m
- İstanbul, Eurasia Subsea Tunnel (subsea) – 2 x 5,400 m
- Çankırı (Ilgaz) - Kastamonu, Ilgaz Tunnel – 5,488 m and 5,480 m.
- Artvin, Hopa (Çavuşlu) - Borçka (Çifteköprü), T3 (3. Cankurtaran) Tunnel – 2 x 5,200 m
- Antalya(İbradı)-Konya(Derebucak), Demirkapı Tunnel – 2 x 5,068 m
- Bayburt (Aydıntepe) - Gümüşhane - Trabzon (Araklı), Salmankaş (Şehit Hamit Şahin) Tunnel – 2 x 4,150 m
- İzmir-Manisa, Sabuncubeli Tunnel – 2 x 4,070 m
- Kahramanmaraş-Göksun, Nuri Pakdil Tunnel – 2 x 4,044 m
- Çanakkale, Ayvacık-Küçükkuyu, T2 (Troya) Tunnel – 2 x 4,017 m
- Hakkari, Yüksekova-Yeniköprü, T1 Tunnel – 2 x 3,965 m
- Rize, İyidere-İkizdere, Güneyce Tunnel – 2 x 3,920 m
- Ordu, Perşembe-Fatsa, Nefise Akçelik (Hapan/Hapağan) Tunnel – 2 x 3,825 m
- İstanbul, Çamlıca-Libadiye Tunnel – 2 x 3,690 m
- Ordu Ring Road, Boztepe Tunnel – 2 x 3,313 m
- Van, Başkale-Gürpınar, Güzeldere (32 Curve) Tunnel – 2 x 3,137 m
- Erzurum-İspir, Dallıkavak (Kuzgun) Tunnel – 2 x 3,105 m
- Rize Ring Road, Salarha Tunnel – 2 x 2,977 m
- Kahramanmaraş-Göksun, Aşık Mahzuni Şerif Tunnel – 2 x 2,895 m
- Trabzon, Maçka New Tunnel – 2 x 2,802 m
- Trabzon(Maçka)-Gümüşhane(Torul), Başar Tunnel – 2 x 2,676 m
- Denizli, Honaz Tunnel – 2 x 2,640 m
- Gümüşhane-Bayburt, Gümüşhane T5 Tunnel – 2 x 2,564 m
- Çanakkale, Eceabat-Gelibolu, Anafartalar Tunnel – 1 x 2,560 m
- Kahramanmaraş-Göksun, Mehmet Akif İnan Tunnel – 2 x 2,545 m
- Bilecik-Vezirhan, Osmangazi (Kocatepe) Tunnel – 2 x 2,474 m
- Trabzon, Coastal Highway, Akyazı (Yıldızlı) Tunnel – 2 x 2,472 m
- Malatya-Elazığ, Kömürhan Tunnel – 2 x 2,400 m
- İstanbul, Dolmabahçe-Bomonti Tunnel – 2 x 2,390 m
- Bartın, Çakraz-Kurucaşile, Dizlermezeci (T3) Tunnel – 2 x 2,350 m
- Bursa-Orhaneli, Doğancı Variant Tunnel – 1 x 2,344 m
- Mersin, Yenikaş-Gözce, Karadere Tunnels, T8 Tunnel – 2 x 2,309 m
- Ardahan, Çıldır-Aktaş, Aşık Şenlik (Mozeret) Tunnel – 2 x 2,308 m
- Van (Gevaş) - Bitlis (Tatvan), Kuskunkıran (Kuzgunkıran) Tunnel – 2 x 2,306 m (2nd tube projected)
- Artvin-Yusufeli, Oruçlu Ripage Tunnel – 1 x 2,277 m
- Erzurum(Uzundere)-Artvin(Yusufeli), Pirinkayalar (Lake Tortum) Tunnel – 1 x 2,272 m
- Rize, Ardeşen-Ayder, Hala Tunnel – 1 x 2,265 m
- Gümüşhane-Bayburt, Gümüşhane T4 Tunnel – 2 x 2,255 m
- Giresun-Tirebolu, Tirebolu Volunteer 42nd Regiment Tunnels, Tirebolu Variant-1 (T1) Tunnel – 2 x 2,175 m
- Yalova, Esenköy-Armutlu, T1 Tunnel - 1 x 2,077 m
- Ankara (Kızılcahamam) – Çankırı (Çerkeş) Tunnel – 1 x 2,071 m
- Ordu Ring Road, Öceli Tunnel – 2 x 2,034 m
- İstanbul, Sarıyer-Çayırbaşı Tunnel – 2 x 2,025 m
- Sinop-Boyabat, Ahmet Muhip Dıranas Tunnel – 1 x 2,016 m
- Ordu, Ünye Bypass Road, Yunus Emre (Saca) Tunnel – 2 x 1,996 m
- Bitlis Bypass Road, T1 (8 August/Bitlis) Tunnel – 2 x 1,947 m
- Gümüşhane, Kürtün-Torul, Budak Tunnel – 2 x 1,942 m
- Bartın, Çakraz-Kurucaşile, Çakraz (T1) Tunnel – 2 x 1,936 m
- Ordu, Mesudiye (Pınarlı-Topçam), T2 (Topçam) Tunnel – 1 x 1,920 m
- Trabzon, Araklı-Arsin, Araklı (Konakönü) Tunnel – 2 x 1,906 m
- Gümüşhane, Kürtün-Torul, Kirazlık Tunnel – 1 x 1,851 m
- Giresun (Doğankent) - Gümüşhane (Kürtün), Güvenlik (Doymuş) Tunnel – 1 x 1,835 m
- Malatya (Doğanşehir) - Adıyaman (Gölbaşı), Erkenek Tunnel – 2 x 1,830 m
- Ordu, Altınordu (Gümüşköy) - Mesudiye (Pınarlı), T10 (Çağlayan) Tunnel – 1 x 1,767 m
- Gümüşhane-Bayburt, Gümüşhane T1 Tunnel – 2 x 1,720 m
- Trabzon (Maçka) - Gümüşhane (Torul), Old Zigana Tunnel – 1 x 1,702 m
- Çanakkale, Ayvacık-Küçükkuyu, T1 (Assos) Tunnel – 2 x 1,693 m
- Antalya, Alanya-Gazipaşa, Hasbahçe-Kargıcak Tunnels, T2 (Dim / Kestel) Tunnel – 2 x 1,692 m
- Sinop-Gerze, Demirciköy Tunnel – 2 x 1,680 m
- İzmir, Konak Tunnel – 2 x 1,674 m
- Karaman (Taşkent) - Antalya (Alanya), Çayarası-3 Tunnel – 1 x 1,671 m
- Gümüşhane-Bayburt, Mescitli Varyant 2 Tunnel – 2 x 1,660 m
- Sivas, Ulaş-Kangal, Yağdonduran Tunnel – 2 x 1,650 m
- İstanbul, Kağıthane-Piyalepaşa Tunnel – 2 x 1,625 m
- Yalova, Esenköy-Armutlu, T2 Tunnel - 1 x 1,609 m
- Malatya, Akçadağ-Darende, Karahan Tunnel – 2 x 1,600 m
- Bartın, Çakraz-Kurucaşile, Cumayanı (T2) Tunnel – 2 x 1,600 m
- Sinop (Gerze) - Samsun (Yakakent), Yenikent Tunnel – 2 x 1,598 m
- Çorum-Laçin, Kırkdilim T3 Tunnel – 2 x 1,578 m
- Mersin, Silifke-Aydıncık, Boğsak Tunnel - 2 x 1,573 m
- Zonguldak-Kilimli, Mithatpaşa-2 (Prof Dr. Teoman Duralı Tunnel-2 / İkinci Makas) Tunnel – 2 x 1,546 m
- Karaman (Taşkent) - Antalya (Alanya), Çayarası-5 Tunnel – 1 x 1,514 m
- İstanbul, Sabiha Gökçen Airport Cut-Cover Tunnel – 2 x 1,500 m
- Kahramanmaraş-Göksun, Necip Fazıl Kısakürek Tunnel – 2 x 1,492 m
- Zonguldak, Kozlu-Ereğli, Değirmenağzı-4 (Ilıksu-4) Tunnel – 1 x 1,468 m
- Kahramanmaraş-Göksun, Sezai Karakoç Tunnel – 2 x 1,463 m
- Giresun-Dereli, Duroğlu Tunnel – 1 x 1,412 m
- Çorum-Laçin, Kırkdilim T1 Tunnel – 2 x 1,409 m
- Van, Bahçesaray-Çatak, Karabet Snow Tunnel – 1 x 1,400 m
- Rize (Çayeli) - Artvin (Pazar), Çayeli Tunnel – 2 x 1,392 m
- Artvin, Kemalpaşa-Hopa, Selimiye Tunnel – 1 x 1,366 m
- Çanakkale, Eceabat-Gelibolu, Conkbayırı Tunnel – 1 x 1,355 m
- İstanbul, Kasımpaşa-Hasköy Tunnel – 2 x 1,316 m
- Trabzon-Maçka, Deliklitaş Tunnel – 2 x 1,306 m
- Antalya, Kemer-Kumluca, Phaselis (Alacasu) Tunnel – 2 x 1,305 m
- Sinop-Gerze, Çiftlik (Çiflikköy) Tunnel – 2 x 1,285 m
- Erzurum (İspir) - Artvin (Yusufeli), T2 (Arkun / Arkın) Tunnel – 1 x 1,275 m
- Gümüşhane (Kürtün) - Giresun (Doğankent), Elceğiz Tunnel – 1 x 1,265 m
- Ankara, Çayırhan-Nallıhan, Çayırhan Connection Tunnel – 2 x 1,262 m
- Rize, Pazar-Çayeli, Pazar-1 Tunnel – 2 x 1,238 m
- Karaman (Taşkent) - Antalya (Alanya), Çayarası-4 Tunnel – 1 x 1,211 m
- Kahramanmaraş-Göksun, Cahit Zarifoğlu Tunnel – 2 x 1,205 m
- Çorum-Laçin, Kırkdilim T2 Tunnel – 2 x 1,197 m
- Gaziantep, Şahinbey 100. Yıl Tunnel – 2 x 1,178 m
- Artvin, Hopa-Kemalpaşa, Kopmuş Tunnel – 1 x 1,162 m
- Kahramanmaraş-Göksun, Bahaettin Karakoç Tunnel – 2 x 1,143 m
- Mersin, Yenikaş-Gözce, Karadere Tunnels, T4 Tunnel – 2 x 1,124 m
- Rize (Fındıklı) - Artvin (Arhavi), Kıyıcık Tunnel – 2 x 1,121 m
- Trabzon, Of-Çaykara, T2 Tunnel – 2 x 1,115 m
- Antalya-Göynük, Orhan Büyükalp Tunnel – 2 x 1,100 m
- Ordu, Topçam-Mesudiye, Mesudiye Tunnel – 1 x 1,109 m
- Trabzon (Maçka) - Gümüşhane (Torul), Torul Tunnel – 2 x 1,103 m
- Bartın-Amasra, Amasra Tunnel – 1 x 1,065 m
- Artvin, Arhavi-Hopa, Arhavi Tunnel – 2 x 1,052 m
- Bolu (Mengen) - Zonguldak (Devrek), Dorukhan Tunnel – 2 x 1,050 m
- Ordu, Topçam-Mesudiye, Çaltepe Tunnel – 1 x 1,042 m
- Ordu, Mesudiye (Pınarlı-Topçam), T1 (Topçam) Tunnel – 1 x 1,040 m
- Mersin, Silifke-Aydıncık, Karayar Tunnel – 2 x 1,033 m
- Trabzon Bypass Road, Beşirli Tunnel – 2 x 1,031 m
- Hakkari (Çukurca) - Şırnak (Uludere), Çukurca Tunnel – 1 x 1,029 m
- Ordu, Altınordu (Gümüşköy) - Mesudiye (Pınarlı), T6 (Akpınar) Tunnel – 1 x 1,016 m
- Antalya-Göynük, Altan Ayağ (Beldibi) Tunnel – 2 x 1,013 m
- Amasya-Tokat(Turhal), Aydınca Şehit Ahmet Özsoy Tunnel – 2 x 1,010 m
- Rize, İyidere-Derepazarı, Sarayköy-1 Tunnel – 2 x 1,004 m
- Giresun, Espiye-Keşap, Uluburun Tunnel – 2 x 980 m
- Amasya, Ferhat Tunnel – 1 x 970 m
- Rize, Ardeşen-Ayder, Çamlıhemşin Tunnel – 1 x 955 m
- Muğla, Fethiye-Dalaman, Göcek Tunnel – 2 x 950 m
- Gümüşhane-Bayburt, Gümüşhane T2 Tunnel – 2 x 936 m
- Samsun (Havza) - Amasya (Suluova), Havza Tunnel – 2 x 923 m
- Amasya(Gümüşhacıköy)-Çorum(Osmancık), Badal Tunnel – 2 x 921 m
- Trabzon (Maçka) - Gümüşhane (Torul), Kürtün Intersection Tunnel – 2 x 916 m
- Yalova, Esenköy-Armutlu, T3 Tunnel - 1 x 907 m
- Rize, İyidere-İkizdere, Hurmalık-1 Tunnel – 2 x 878 m
- Amasya-Taşova, Akdağ Tunnel – 1 x 875 m
- Rize, İyidere-Derepazarı, Sarayköy-2 Tunnel – 2 x 856 m
- Mersin, Silifke-Aydıncık, Limankale Tunnel - 2 x 851 m
- Bilecik-Vezirhan, Ertuğrulgazi (Kaletepe) Tunnel – 2 x 840 m
- Mersin, Silifke-Aydıncık, Büyükeceli T2 Tunnel – 2 x 836 m
- Amasya Beltway, T1 Tunnel – 2 x 829 m
- Mersin (Anamur) - Antalya (Gazipaşa), Anamur-T5 Tunnel – 2 x 827 m
- Şırnak-Cizre, Cudi-2 (Şehit Jandarma Yüzbaşı Mustafa Erdal) Tunnel – 2 x 822 m
- Mersin, Yenikaş-Gözce, Karadere Tunnels, T7 Tunnel – 2 x 820 m
- Rize, İyidere-İkizdere, Hurmalık-2 Tunnel – 2 x 815 m
- İstanbul, Taksim Square Cut-Cover Tunnel – 2 x 800 m
- Artvin-Yusufeli, Şehirler-1 Tunnel – 1 x 800 m
- İstanbul, Şile-Ağva, T5 Tunnel – 2 x 795 m
- Çanakkale, Eceabat-Gelibolu, 57. Alay (Eceabat) Tunnel – 1 x 792 m
- Artvin, Hopa-Borçka, T1 (1. Cankurtaran) Tunnel – 2 x 780 m
- Rize, İyidere-İkizdere, Güneyce 2 Tunnel – 2 x 762 m
- Gümüşhane-Bayburt, Gümüşhane T3 Tunnel – 2 x 754 m
- Şırnak-Cizre, Cudi-1 (Şehit Güvenlik Korucusu Dündar Page) Tunnel – 2 x 751 m
- Ordu, Ünye Bypass Road, Bayramca (Gürecili/Gürecülü) Tunnel – 2 x 741 m
- Ordu, Topçam-Mesudiye, Ilışar Tunnel – 1 x 729 m
- İstanbul, Ümraniye-Üsküdar, Vecdi Diker Tunnel – 2 x 720 m
- Karabük-Yenice National Road, Suçatı Tunnel – 1 x 705 m
- Gümüşhane, Kürtün-Torul, Özkürtün Tunnel – 1 x 704 m
- Yalova, Esenköy-Armutlu, T4 Tunnel - 1 x 701 m
- İstanbul, Beykoz-Kavacık, Halil Ulukurt Tunnel – 2 x 690 m
- Trabzon Bypass Road, Boztepe Tunnel – 2 x 687 m
- Malatya, Hekimhan-Yazıhan, Hasançelebi Variant T3 Tunnel – 2 x 669 m
- Gümüşhane-Bayburt, Taşocağı Tunnel – 2 x 663 m
- Giresun, Tirebolu Volunteer 42nd Regiment Tunnels, Tirebolu Variant-2 (T2) Tunnel – 2 x 661 m
- Rize, Pazar-Çayeli, Pazar-2 Tunnel – 2 x 660 m
- Antalya, Alanya-Gazipaşa, Hasbahçe-Kargıcak Tunnels, T1 (Oba / Tosmar) Tunnel – 2 x 653 m
- Ordu, Altınordu (Gümüşköy) - Mesudiye (Pınarlı), T7A (Darıcabaşı/Şehit Onur Karakuş) Tunnel – 1 x 653 m
- Çanakkale, Eceabat-Gelibolu, Arıburnu (Bigalı) Tunnel – 1 x 644 m
- Batman, Hasankeyf-Gercüş, Hasankeyf Tunnel – 2 x 638 m
- Artvin, Hopa-Kemalpaşa, Esenkıyı Tunnel – 1 x 638 m
- Zonguldak-Devrek, Üzülmez (Asma) Tunnel – 2 x 630 m
- Malatya, Hekimhan-Yazıhan, Çebiş (Hekimhan/Çepiç) Tunnel - 2 x 626 m
- Ordu, Altınordu (Uzunisa-Gümüşköy), T2 (Gümüşköy) Tunnel - 1 x 620 m
- Kahramanmaraş-Göksun, Rasim Özdenören Tunnel – 2 x 615 m
- Bursa (İnegöl) - Bilecik (Bozüyük), Mezit Tunnel – 1 x 606 m
- Gümüşhane (Kürtün) - Giresun (Doğankent), Günyüzü-2 Tunnel – 1 x 605 m
- Artvin-Yusufeli, İşhan-3 Tunnel - 1 x 600 m
- Erzurum (İspir) - Rize (İkizdere), Özbağ-1 Tunnel – 2 x 593 m
- Trabzon (Maçka) - Gümüşhane (Torul), Köprübaşı Tunnel – 2 x 589 m
- Burdur (Bucak) - Antalya (Aksu), Kargı Tunnel – 1 x 580 m
- Adapazarı, Karasu-Kaynarca, Kaynarca Tunnel – 2 x 576 m
- Trabzon, Of-Çaykara, T1 Tunnel – 1 x 575 m
- Giresun (Eynesil) - Trabzon (Beşikdüzü), Eynesil Tunnel – 2 x 574 m
- Trabzon, Sürmene-Of, Çamburnu Tunnel – 1 x 573 m
- Zonguldak-Devrek, Sapça Tunnel – 2 x 571 m
- Ordu, Altınordu (Gümüşköy) - Mesudiye (Pınarlı), T7B (Darıcabaşı) Tunnel – 1 x 565 m
- Ordu, Altınordu (Gümüşköy) - Mesudiye (Pınarlı), T5 (Yeşilpınar/Şehit Şeref Kıran) Tunnel – 1 x 558 m
- Samsun (Vezirköprü) - Sinop (Durağan), Kocakaya Tunnel – 1 x 553 m
- Sivas Urban Road, Mevlana Tunnel – 2 x 550 m
- Erzurum (İspir) - Artvin (Yusufeli), Güllübağ Tunnel – 1 x 550 m
- Artvin, Kemalpaşa-Hopa, Liman Tunnel – 1 x 546 m
- İstanbul, Şile-Ağva, T7 Tunnel – 2 x 540 m
- Mersin (Anamur) - Antalya (Gazipaşa), Anamur-T1 Tunnel – 2 x 537 m
- Trabzon Bypass Road, Bahçecik Tunnel – 2 x 534 m
- Rize, Pehlivantaşı-Kalkandere, Pehlivantaşı T-3 Tunnel – 2 x 530 m
- Ordu, Altınordu (Uzunisa-Gümüşköy), T3 (Gümüşköy) Tunnel – 1 x 525 m
- Kahramanmaraş-Göksun, Abdurrahim Karakoç Tunnel – 2 x 518 m
- Erzurum (İspir) - Rize (İkizdere), Özlüce Tunnel – 2 x 516 m
- Yalova, Esenköy-Armutlu, T6 Tunnel - 1 x 512 m
- Mersin (Anamur) - Antalya (Gazipaşa), Anamur-T2 Tunnel – 2 x 501 m
- Elazığ, Maden-Sivrice, Maden Tunnel – 1 x 486 m
- İstanbul, Şile-Ağva, T6 Tunnel – 2 x 464 m
- Karaman, Ermenek-Görmeli, Ermenek Tunnel – 1 x 457 m
- Rize, Ardeşen-Ayder, Hala-2 Tunnel – 1 x 450 m
- Hakkari, Yüksekova-Esendere, Sarıtaş Tunnel – 1 x 445
- Erzurum, İspir-Pazaryolu, İspir Tunnel – 2 x 536 m
- Kahramanmaraş-Göksun, Erdem Bayazıt Tunnel – 2 x 488 m
- Gümüşhane-Bayburt, Hacıemin-1 Tunnel – 1 x 469 m
- Ordu, Altınordu (Gümüşköy) - Mesudiye (Pınarlı), T3 (Pınarlı/Şehit Ahmet Güneşdoğdu) Tunnel – 1 x 445 m
- Trabzon Coastal Highway, Akyazı (Kanuni) Connection Tunnel – 1 x 441 m
- Zonguldak-Kilimli, Aslankaya (Aslankayası) Tunnel – 2 x 440 m
- Malatya, Hekimhan-Yazıhan, Hasançelebi Variant T1 Tunnel – 2 x 440 m
- Amasya Beltway, T2 Cut-Cover Tunnel – 2 x 425 m
- Konya, Bozkır-Hadim, Eğiste Viaduct Cut-Cover Tunnel – 2 x 420 m
- Bitlis-Siirt (Baykan), T3 (Deliklitaş-2/Semiramis-2) Tunnel – 1 x 420 m
- Gümüşhane (Kürtün) - Giresun (Doğankent), Taşlıca Tunnel – 1 x 416 m
- Ordu, Topçam-Mesudiye, Geyikkaya (Bayırköy/Şehit Özer Ayrancı) Tunnel – 1 x 410 m
- Karabük-Yenice National Road, Yellikaya Tunnel – 1 x 410 m
- Amasya Beltway, T4 (Turan Eren) Tunnel – 2 x 409 m
- Siirt (Baykan)-Bitlis, Demirışık (Demir Işık) Cut-Cover Tunnel – 2 x 403 m
- Mersin, Silifke-Aydıncık, Büyükeceli T1 Tunnel – 2 x 396 m
- Erzurum (İspir) - Artvin (Yusufeli), T1 (Karakale) Tunnel – 1 x 395 m
- Gümüşhane-Bayburt, Mescitli-2 Tunnel – 1 x 395 m
- Samsun (Havza) - Amasya (Suluova), Şehzadeler Tunnel – 2 x 392 m
- Sivas (Koyulhisar) - Tokat (Reşadiye), Aşağıkale (Kaletepe) Tunnel – 1 x 390 m
- Giresun-Dereli, Taşlıca Tunnel – 1 x 386 m
- Mersin, Yenikaş-Gözce, Karadere Tunnels, T5 Tunnel – 2 x 385 m
- Malatya-Elazığ, Martyr Burhan Gatfar Tunnel – 2 x 382 m
- Artvin, Kemalpaşa-Sarp Kemalpaşa Tunnel – 1 x 377 m
- Ordu, Altınordu (Uzunisa-Gümüşköy), T6 (Kuylu) Tunnel – 1 x 371 m
- Bitlis-Siirt (Baykan), T2 (Deliklitaş-1/Semiramis-1) Tunnel – 1 x 369 m
- Giresun, Espiye-Keşap, Arıdurak Tunnel – 2 x 366 m
- Artvin, Hopa-Borçka, T2 (2. Cankurtaran) Tunnel – 2 x 365 m
- Afyonkarahisar Beltway, Karahisar Tunnel – 2 x 365 m
- Antalya, Alanya-Gazipaşa, Hasbahçe-Kargıcak Tunnels, T3 (Mahmutlar) Tunnel – 2 x 363 m
- Giresun, Espiye-Keşap, Geçilmez Tunnel – 1 x 362 m
- Rize, Pehlivantaşı-Kalkandere, Pehlivantaşı T-1 Tunnel – 2 x 361 m
- Malatya, Hekimhan-Yazıhan, Hasançelebi Variant T2 Tunnel – 2 x 357 m
- Artvin, Kemalpaşa-Sarp, Üçkardeşler-2 Tunnel – 1 x 353 m
- Sinop, Gerze Tunnel – 2 x 352 m
- Gümüşhane (Kürtün) - Giresun (Doğankent), Günyüzü-1 Tunnel – 1 x 351 m
- Zonguldak, Kozlu-Ereğli, Değirmenağzı-5 (Ilıksu-5) Tunnel – 1 x 350 m
- Karabük-Yenice National Road, Balıkısık-1 Tunnel – 1 x 350 m
- Trabzon, Maçka Old Tunnel – 1 x 340 m
- Trabzon Bypass Road, Çukurçayır-1 Tunnel – 2 x 338 m
- Zonguldak-Kilimli, Mithatpaşa-1 (Prof Dr. Teoman Duralı Tunnel-1 / Bağlık) Tunnel – 2 x 337 m
- Yalova, Esenköy-Armutlu, T5 Tunnel - 1 x 334 m
- Antalya-Beldibi, Adnan Sezgin Tunnel – 2 x 332 m
- Erzurum (İspir) - Rize (İkizdere), Özbağ-2 Tunnel – 2 x 332 m
- Giresun-Dereli, Dereli Tunnel – 1 x 331 m
- Karabük-Eskipazar, Cildikısık Tunnel – 2 x 330 m
- Mersin, Yenikaş-Gözce, Karadere Tunnels, T6 Tunnel – 2 x 330 m
- Malatya (Doğanşehir) - Adıyaman (Gölbaşı), Erkenek Old Tunnel – 1 x 330 m
- Erzincan (Üzümlü) - Erzurum (Tercan), Mutu (Muti) Tunnel – 2 x 328 m
- Gümüşhane-Bayburt, Gümüşhane Tunnel – 1 x 323 m
- İstanbul, Haliç Congress Center, Sütlüce Cut-Cover Tunnel – 2 x 320 m
- Ordu, Altınordu (Gümüşköy) - Mesudiye (Pınarlı), T8 (Özlükent/Şehit Ozan Özmen) Tunnel – 1 x 316 m
- Muğla (Yatağan) - Aydın (Çine), Gökbel Tunnel – 2 x 315 m
- Ordu, Perşembe-Fatsa, Asarkayası Tunnel – 2 x 314 m
- Amasya Beltway, T3 Cut-Cover Tunnel – 1 x 304 m
- Trabzon(Maçka)-Gümüşhane(Torul), Dikkaya Tunnel – 2 x 300 m
- Ordu, Altınordu (Uzunisa-Gümüşköy), T5 (Kuylu) Tunnel – 1 x 300 m
- Karabük-Yenice National Road, Şahinkayası Tunnel – 1 x 298 m
- Malatya, Hekimhan-Yazıhan, Hasançelebi Tunnel – 2 x 297 m
- Gümüşhane-Bayburt, Gümüşhane K-1 Kavşak Kolu Tunnel – 1 x 295 m
- Malatya (Hekimhan) - Sivas (Kangal), Karakısık-1 Tunnel – 2 x 293 m
- İstanbul, Ümraniye-Üsküdar, Tantavi Tunnel – 2 x 290 m
- Kahramanmaraş-Göksun, Alaeddin Özdenören Tunnel – 2 x 285 m
- Malatya (Hekimhan) - Sivas (Kangal), Karakısık-2 Tunnel – 2 x 281 m
- Samsun (Havza) - Amasya (Suluova), 19 May Tunnel – 2 x 280 m
- Karabük-Yenice National Road, Balıkısık-2 Tunnel – 1 x 280 m
- Trabzon, Çarşıbaşı-Akçaabat, Yoroz Tunnel – 1 x 274 m
- Ordu, Altınordu (Gümüşköy) - Mesudiye (Pınarlı), T1 (Pınarlı/Şehit Osman Güner) Tunnel – 1 x 271 m
- Çorum (İskilip) - Kastamonu (Tosya), İskilip Tunnel – 1 x 269 m
- İstanbul, Altıntepe (Bostancı) Tunnel (1957) – 1 x 268 m
- Zonguldak, Kozlu-Ereğli, Değirmenağzı-1 (Ilıksu-1) Tunnel – 1 x 268 m
- Ordu, Altınordu (Gümüşköy) - Mesudiye (Pınarlı), T9 (Özlükent) Tunnel – 1 x 263 m
- Mersin, Silifke-Aydıncık, Büyükeceli T3 Tunnel – 2 x 262 m
- Ordu, Perşembe-Fatsa, Kozbükü Tunnel – 2 x 261 m
- Ordu, Altınordu (Gümüşköy) - Mesudiye (Pınarlı), T4 (Pınarlı/Şehit Murat Öndin) Tunnel – 1 x 259 m
- Ordu, Altınordu (Gümüşköy) - Mesudiye (Pınarlı), T2 (Pınarlı/Şehit Canip Demircan) Tunnel – 1 x 257 m
- Gümüşhane, İkisu-Şiran, Gümüşkaya (Aynalı, Aynalı Viraj) Tunnel – 1 x 254 m
- Giresun-Dereli, Iklıkçı Tunnel – 1 x 252 m
- Kocaeli, Başiskele-Gölcük, Bahçecik Cut-Cover Tunnel – 2 x 250 m
- Van, Çatak-Gevaş, Çatak Snow Tunnel – 1 x 250 m
- Rize, Pehlivantaşı-Kalkandere, Pehlivantaşı T-2 Tunnel – 2 x 249 m
- Karaman (Taşkent) - Antalya (Alanya), Çayarası-2 Tunnel – 1 x 247 m
- Malatya, Hekimhan-Yazıhan, Sarsap (Karaca/Yazıhan) Tunnel – 2 x 240 m
- Trabzon Bypass Road, Beşirli Cut-Cover Tunnel – 2 x 240 m
- Karabük-Yenice National Road, İkizdere Tunnel – 1 x 240 m
- Karabük-Yenice National Road, Bolkuş Tunnel – 1 x 239 m
- Muğla, Bafa-Milas, Karacabel Tunnel – 2 x 236 m
- Bitlis-Siirt (Baykan), T4 (Buzlupınar) Tunnel – 2 x 233 m
- Ordu, Altınordu (Uzunisa-Gümüşköy), T1 (Karaağaç) Tunnel – 1 x 232 m
- Gümüşhane-Bayburt, Mescitli-1 Tunnel – 2 x 226 m
- Kahramanmaraş-Göksun (Tekir) Ridgeway, Püren Tunnel – 1 x 225 m
- Karabük-Yenice National Road, Çakmakkaya Tunnel – 1 x 225 m
- Karaman (Taşkent) - Antalya (Alanya), Çayarası-1 Tunnel – 1 x 224 m
- Trabzon Bypass Road, Çatak Cut-Cover Tunnel – 2 x 223 m
- Ordu, Altınordu (Uzunisa-Gümüşköy), T4 (Kuylu) Tunnel – 1 x 220 m
- Zonguldak, Kozlu-Ereğli, Değirmenağzı-3 (Ilıksu-3) Tunnel – 1 x 219 m
- Giresun-Dereli, Çalca Tunnel – 1 x 217 m
- Artvin, Kemalpaşa-Sarp, Üçkardeşler-1 Tunnel – 1 x 216 m
- Artvin, Arhavi-Hopa, Arhavi Old Tunnel – 1 x 212 m
- Karabük-Yenice National Road, Yassıkaya Tunnel – 1 x 212 m
- Gümüşhane-Bayburt, Hacıemin-3 Tunnel – 1 x 210 m
- Gümüşhane-Bayburt, Gümüşhane Cut-Cover Tunnel – 2 x 207 m
- Trabzon (Maçka) - Gümüşhane (Torul), Harmancık Tunnel – 2 x 205 m
- Karabük-Yenice National Road, Yalnızca Tunnel – 1 x 205 m
- Giresun, Tirebolu-Espiye, Kiliseburnu Tunnel – 2 x 200 m
- Giresun-Keşap, Aksu (Keşap) Tunnel – 2 x 199 m
- Ordu, Altınordu (Gümüşköy) - Mesudiye (Pınarlı), T9A (Özlükent) Tunnel – 1 x 195 m
- Ordu, Altınordu (Gümüşköy) - Mesudiye (Pınarlı), T11 (Gelinkaya) Tunnel – 1 x 192 m
- Gümüşhane-Bayburt, Pınarın Tunnel – 2 x 191 m
- Kütahya, Simav-Gediz, Uğurlugüme Cut-Cover Tunnel – 2 x 190m
- Rize, Pazar-Çayeli, Pazar Entrance Cut-Cover Tunnel – 2 x 188 m
- Karabük-Yenice National Road, Keltepe Tunnel – 1 x 185 m
- Trabzon, Of-Çaykara, T4 Tunnel – 2 x 182 m
- Gümüşhane-Bayburt, Gümüşhane K-3 Kavşak Kolu Tunnel – 1 x 182 m
- Zonguldak-Devrek, Gökgöl Tunnel – 1 x 180 m
- Ordu, Perşembe-Fatsa, Tekkebak Tunnel – 2 x 170 m
- Sinop-Gerze, Lala Cut-Cover Tunnel – 2 x 168 m
- Bitlis-Siirt (Baykan), T5 (Doğudeniz/Sarıkonak) Tunnel – 2 x 160 m
- Sinop, Dikmen-Akgüney, Güzelçay Tunnel – 1 x 160 m
- Kastamonu, İnebolu-Küre, Yenigün Tunnel – 1 x 160 m
- Artvin, Kemalpaşa-Sarp, Sarp-3 Tunnel – 1 x 157 m
- Artvin, Kemalpaşa-Sarp, Sarp-2 Tunnel – 1 x 152 m
- Ordu, Bolaman-Perşembe, Çaka (Hoynat) Tunnel – 1 x 151 m
- Ordu, Perşembe-Fatsa, Kadıoğlu Tunnel – 2 x 150 m
- Sinop, Boyabat-Saraydüzü, Yeşilyurt Cut-Cover T2 Tunnel – 1 x 146 m
- Trabzon Coastal Highway, Trabzon (Çömlekçi) Tunnel – 2 x 144 m
- Gümüşhane-Bayburt, Hacıemin-2 Tunnel – 1 x 141 m
- İstanbul, Cebeci Road, Habibler Cut-Cover Tunnel – 2 x 135 m
- Zonguldak, Kozlu-Ereğli, Değirmenağzı-2 (Ilıksu-2) Tunnel – 1 x 132 m
- Zonguldak-Kilimli, Kapuz-Uzunkum Cut-Cover (T0) Tunnel – 2 x 131 m
- İstanbul, Beylerbeyi-Kuzguncuk, Beylerbeyi Köprüaltı Tunnel – 1 x 130 m
- Gümüşhane-Bayburt, Gümüşhane K-2 Kavşak Kolu Tunnel – 1 x 130 m
- Sinop-Boyabat, Hıdırlı Cut-Cover Tunnel – 2 x 129 m
- Karabük-Yenice, Karabük Downtown Cut-Cover Tunnel – 1 x 120 m
- Karabük-Yenice National Road, Alaçamkaya Tunnel – 1 x 117 m
- Rize, Pazar-Çayeli, İkiztepe (Pazar) Tunnel – 1 x 115 m
- Artvin, Kemalpaşa-Sarp, Sarp-1 Tunnel – 1 x 108 m
- Hakkari-Yüksekova, Erzikli Tunnel – 1 x 107 m
- Karabük-Yenice National Road, Deligeçit Tunnel – 1 x 104 m
- Karabük-Yenice National Road, Ezankaya Tunnel – 1 x 98 m
- Sinop, Boyabat-Saraydüzü, Yeşilyurt Cut-Cover T1 Tunnel – 1 x 96 m
- Hakkari-Yüksekova, Arslankaya Tunnel – 1 x 96 m
- Gümüşhane-Bayburt, Mescitli Varyant 1 Tunnel – 1 x 84 m
- Giresun-Dereli, Çınarcık (T5) Tunnel – 1 x 75 m
- İstanbul, Silahtarağa Tunnel – 1 x 75 m
- Gümüşhane-Bayburt, Gümüşhane K-3 Kavşak Tunnel – 1 x 74 m
- Rize (Çayeli) - Artvin (Pazar), Çayeli Old Tunnel – 2 x 70 m
- Karabük-Yenice National Road, Pirinçlik Tunnel – 1 x 69 m
- Ordu-Perşembe, Perşembe Tunnel – 1 x 67 m
- Şanlıurfa, Birecik Tunnel – 1 x 66 m
- Hakkari-Yüksekova, Yeniköprü Tunnel – 1 x 67 m
- Gümüşhane (Kürtün) - Giresun (Doğankent), Uluköy Tunnel – 1 x 60 m
- Karabük-Yenice National Road, Ulubelen Tunnel – 1 x 36 m

== Road tunnels (under construction) ==
- Hatay, Dörtyol-Hassa, Amanos Tunnel (under construction) – 2 x 18,800 m
- Antalya(Gazipaşa-Güneyköy)-Mersin(Anamur-Kaledran), Gökçebelen Tunnel (under construction) – 2 x 11,250 m
- Antalya(Akseki)-Konya(Seydişehir), Alacabel Tunnel (under construction) – 2 x 7,360 m
- Erzurum-İspir, Kırık (Hortik/Gölyurt) Tunnel (under construction) – 2 x 7,105 m
- İstanbul, Sarıyer-Kilyos Tunnel (under construction) – 2 x 6,875 m
- Bayburt(Maden)-Erzurum(Aşkale), Kop Tunnel (under construction) – 2 x 6,500 m
- Gümüşhane, Pirahmet-Kelkit, Pekün (Ünlüpınar) Tunnel (under construction) – 2 x 6,350 m
- Gümüşhane-Bayburt, Vauk T2 Tunnel (under construction) – 2 x 5,950 m
- Gümüşhane, İkisu-Şiran, Tersun Tunnel (under construction) – 2 x 5,500 m
- Çankırı (Ilgaz) - Kastamonu, Ilgaz-2 Tunnel (under construction) – 2 x 5,330 m
- Kastamonu, İnebolu-Küre, T4 Tunnel (under construction) – 2 x 5,277 m
- Erzincan, Refahiye-İliç, Sünebeli Tunnel (under construction) – 2 x 5,242 m
- Ardahan, Posof-Damal, Ilgar (Ulgar) Tunnel (under construction) – 2 x 4,962 m
- Erzurum(Çat)-Bingöl(Karlıova), Çirişli Tunnel (under construction) – 2 x 4,750 m
- Tokat-Sivas(Yıldızeli), Çamlıbel Tunnel (under construction) – 2 x 4,735 m
- Bartın, Çakraz-Kurucaşile, Karaman (T4) Tunnel (under construction) – 2 x 4,630 m
- Hakkari, Yüksekova-Yeniköprü, T2 Tunnel (under construction) – 2 x 4,570 m
- Erzurum, Tortum-Narman, Kireçli-Şehitler (Kutumar) Tunnel (under construction) – 2 x 4,375 m
- Sivas, Zara-Suşehri, Geminbeli (Gemin) Tunnel (under construction) – 2 x 4,294 m
- İstanbul, Dolmabahçe-Levazım Tunnel (under construction) – 2 x 3,900 m
- Kastamonu, Küre-Seydiler, Uzunöz (T2) Tunnel (under construction) – 2 x 3,690 m
- Burdur-Çeltikçi, Çeltikçi Beli (Çeltikçi) Tunnel (under construction) – 2 x 3,500 m
- Erzurum(Olur)-Artvin(Ardanuç), Olur-Ardanuç Tunnel (under construction) – 1 x 3,490 m
- Muğla(Seydikemer)-Burdur(Söğüt), Karabel Tunnel (under construction) – 2 x 3,363 m
- Karaman-Mersin(Mut), Sertavul Tunnel (under construction) – 2 x 3,290 m
- Rize, İyidere-İkizdere, İkizdere-1 Tunnel (under construction) – 2 x 3,265 m
- Gaziantep Beltway, Dülük Tunnel (under construction) – 2 x 3,250 m
- Bartın, Çakraz-Kurucaşile, Tekkeönü (T5) Tunnel (under construction) – 2 x 3,125 m
- Kastamonu, Küre-Seydiler, T1 Tunnel (under construction) – 2 x 2,696 m
- Çanakkale, Eceabat-Gelibolu, T5 (Ilgardere) Tunnel (under construction) – 1 x 2,558 m
- İzmir, Buca Onat Tunnel (under construction) – 2 x 2,543 m
- Zonguldak, Göbü-Filyos, T5 Tunnel (under construction) – 2 x 2,520 m
- Antalya-Burdur, Çubukbeli (Çubuk) Tunnel (under construction) – 2 x 2,200 m
- Zonguldak, Filyos-Saltukova, T1 Tunnel (under construction) – 2 x 2,200 m
- Kastamonu, İnebolu-Küre, T3 Tunnel (under construction) – 2 x 2,060 m
- Zonguldak, Göbü-Filyos, T4 Tunnel (under construction) – 2 x 2,045 m
- Trabzon, Değirmendere Tunnel (under construction) – 2 x 1,970 m
- Zonguldak, Kilimli-Çatalağzı, T7 Tunnel (under construction) – 2 x 1,910 m
- Konya, Taşkent-Çetmi, Çetmi Tunnel (under construction) – 1 x 1,770 m
- Ordu Ring Road, T2 (Akçatepe-2) Tunnel (under construction) – 2 x 1,740 m
- Zonguldak, Muslu-Göbü, T6 Tunnel (under construction) – 2 x 1,700 m
- Gümüşhane-Bayburt, Vauk T1 Tunnel (under construction) – 2 x 1,650 m
- Sivas(Divriği)-Malatya(Arapgir), Sarıçiçek-1 Tunnel (under construction) – 1 x 1,585 m
- Erzincan, Refahiye-İliç, Gümüşakar Tunnel (under construction) – 2 x 1,580 m
- Tokat-Niksar Tunnel (under construction) – 2 x 1,440 m
- Antalya(Alanya), Dim-1 Tunnel (under construction) – 2 x 1,389 m
- Bitlis, Tatvan Bypass Road, T2 Tunnel (under construction) – 2 x 1,270 m
- Bitlis, Tatvan Bypass Road, T1 Tunnel (under construction) – 2 x 1,236 m
- Sivas(Divriği)-Malatya(Arapgir), Sarıçiçek-2 Tunnel (under construction) – 1 x 1,215 m
- Ordu Ring Road, Terzili Tunnel (under construction) – 2 x 1,180 m
- Rize, İyidere-İkizdere, İkizdere-2 Tunnel (under construction) – 2 x 1,160 m
- Adana, Kozan-Mansurlu, T1 Cut-Cover Tunnel (under construction) – 1 x 985 m
- Muğla, Bodrum(Ortakent)-Yalıkavak, Yalıkavak (Türkmen) Tunnel (under construction) – 2 x 950 m
- Ordu Ring Road, T3 (Turnasuyu) Tunnel (under construction) – 2 x 816 m
- Antalya, Kemer-Kumluca, Sarıören Tunnel (under construction) - 2 x 670 m
- Zonguldak, Kilimli-Çatalağzı, T8 Tunnel (under construction) – 2 x 660 m
- Kastamonu, İnebolu-Küre, T5 Tunnel (under construction) – 2 x 620 m
- Gümüşhane-Kelkit, Yeniköy Tunnel (under construction) – 2 x 580 m
- Konya, Taşkent-Çetmi, Karagedik Tunnel (under construction) – 1 x 555 m
- Çanakkale, Eceabat-Gelibolu, T4 (Cennetköy) Tunnel (under construction) – 1 x 503 m
- Çorum, Bayat-İskilip, Bayat Cut-Cover Tunnel (under construction) – 1 x 450 m
- Ordu Ring Road, T1 (Akçatepe-1) Tunnel (under construction) – 2 x 440 m
- Zonguldak, Göbü-Filyos, T2 Tunnel (under construction) – 2 x 440 m
- Konya, Taşkent-Çetmi, Afşar Tunnel (under construction) – 1 x 440 m
- Zonguldak, Göbü-Filyos, T3 Tunnel (under construction) – 2 x 400 m
- Niğde Downtown Tunnel (under construction) – 1 x 370 m
- İstanbul, Şile-Ağva, T3 Tunnel (under construction) – 2 x 335 m
- Konya, Taşkent-Çetmi, Balcılar Tunnel (under construction) – 1 x 300 m
- İstanbul, Şile-Ağva, T4 Tunnel (under construction) – 2 x 267 m
- Rize, Hemşin-Çamlıhemşin T2 Tunnel (under construction) – 1 x 260 m
- Antalya(Alanya), Dim-2 Tunnel (under construction) – 2 x 205 m
- Rize, Hemşin-Çamlıhemşin T1 Tunnel (under construction) – 1 x 190 m

== Road tunnels (projected) ==
- Zonguldak Beltway, Gökgöl-Ilıksu Tunnel (projected) – 2 x 13,000 m
- Van, Gevaş-Bahçesaray Tunnel (projected) – 1 x 13,000 m
- Ardahan-Artvin(Şavşat), Sahara Tunnel (projected) – 2 x 12,976 m
- Erzurum-Tekman, Palandöken Tunnel (projected) – 2 x 12,155 m
- Trabzon(Çaykara)-Bayburt(Aydıntepe), Soğanlı (Soğanlıdağ) Tunnel (projected) 2 x 11,220 m
- Antalya, Manavgat-Akseki, Ahmetler Tunnel (projected) – 2 x 10,585 m
- Erzurum-İspir, Kavaklıdere Tunnel (projected) – 2 x 10,000 m
- Erzincan-Refahiye, Sakaltutan Tunnel (projected) – 2 x 8,780 m
- Antalya, Finike-Demre T1 Tunnel (projected) – 2 x 7,910 m
- Kayseri(Tomarza)-Adana(Tufanbeyli), Berçin (Dede Beli) Tunnel (projected) – 2 x 6,845 m
- Sivas(İmranlı)-Erzincan(Refahiye), Kızıldağ Tunnel (projected) – 2 x 6,600 m
- Great Istanbul Tunnel, European Side Two Layered Tunnel (projected) – 2 x 6,500 m
- Bitlis(Tatvan)-Van(Gevaş), Yelkenli Tunnel (projected) – 2 x 6,250 m
- Giresun, Dereli-Şebinkarahisar, Pınarlar Tunnel (projected) – 1 x 6,011 m
- Gümüşhane(Kelkit)-Erzincan, Pöske (Ahmediye) Tunnel (projected) – 2 x 6,000 m
- Kütahya(Domaniç)-Bursa(İnegöl), Hayme Ana (Kocadağ/Kocayayla) Tunnel (projected) – 2 x 6,000 m
- Artvin, Borçka, Macahel (Camili) Tunnel (projected) – 1 x 5,990 m
- Ağrı(Doğubeyazıt)-Van(Çaldıran), Tendürek Tunnel (projected) – 2 x 5,500 m
- Giresun Ring Road, Gülyalı-Keşap T16 Tunnel (projected) –2 x 5,387 m
- Antalya, Manavgat-Akseki, Karpuzçay-2 Tunnel (projected) – 2 x 4,920 m
- Afyonkarahisar, İscehisar-Bayat, Köroğlubeli Tunnel (projected) – 2 x 4,825 m
- Giresun Ring Road, Gülyalı-Keşap T19 Tunnel (projected) – 2 x 4,652 m
- Erzurum-Pasinler, Nenehatun Tunnel (projected) – 2 x 4,600 m
- Great Istanbul Tunnel, Asian Side Two Layered Tunnel (projected) – 2 x 4,400 m
- Bolu(Mudurnu)-Sakarya(Akyazı), Hodan (T2) Tunnel (projected) – 2 x 4,370 m
- Sivas(Gürün)-Kayseri(Pınarbaşı), Mazıkıran Tunnel (projected) – 2 x 4,200 m
- Fatsa Beltway, T1 Tunnel (projected) – 2 x 4,060 m
- Gümüşhane(Kürtün)-Trabzon(Tonya), T4 Tunnel (projected) – 1 x 3,630 m
- Kastamonu-Tosya, Tosya Tunnel (projected) – 2 x 3,625 m
- Antalya, Manavgat-Akseki, Karpuzçay-1 Tunnel (projected) – 2 x 3,565 m
- Antalya, Alanya-Gazipaşa, Kargıcak-Yeşilöz Tunnels, T1 (Kargıcak) Tunnel (projected) – 2 x 3,540 m
- Giresun Ring Road, Gülyalı-Keşap T13 Tunnel (projected) – 2 x 3,456 m
- Ardahan(Posof), Gümüşkavak Tunnel (projected) – 2 x 3,395 m
- İstanbul, Levazım-Akatlar Tunnel (projected) – 2 x 3,360 m
- Antalya, Kaş-Kalkan, Pınarbaşı Tunnel (projected) – 2 x 3,330 m
- Antalya(Akseki)-Konya(Seydişehir), Tınaztepe Tunnel (projected) – 2 x 3,300 m
- Fatsa Beltway, T3 Tunnel (projected) – 2 x 3,090 m
- Giresun Ring Road, Gülyalı-Keşap T20 Tunnel (projected) – 2 x 3,085 m
- İstanbul, Levazım-Zincirlidere Tunnel (projected) – 2 x 2,940 m
- Balıkesir(Bigadiç)-Kütahya(Simav), Demirci-Düvertepe Tunnels, T2 Tunnel (projected) – 2 x 2,874 m
- Trabzon(Çaykara)-Bayburt(Aydıntepe), Karaçam Tunnel (projected) 2 x 2,870 m
- Bolu(Mudurnu)-Sakarya(Akyazı), Dokurcun (T7) Tunnel (projected) – 2 x 2,860 m
- Antalya, Manavgat-Akseki, Beydiğin (T1) Tunnel (projected) – 2 x 2,820 m
- Rize, Hemşin-Çamlıhemşin T4 Tunnel (projected) – 1 x 2554 m
- Konya Beltway, Seydişehir-Beyşehir, T2 Tunnel (projected) – 2 x 2,500 m
- Giresun Ring Road, Gülyalı-Keşap T15 Tunnel (projected) – 2 x 2,426 m
- Giresun Ring Road, Gülyalı-Keşap T8 Tunnel (projected) – 2 x 2,405 m
- Rize, Hemşin-Çamlıhemşin T5 Tunnel (projected) – 1 x 2232 m
- Giresun Ring Road, Gülyalı-Keşap T3 Tunnel (projected) – 2 x 2,164 m
- Trabzon(Çaykara)-Bayburt(Aydıntepe), Köknar Tunnel (projected) 2 x 1,990 m
- Balıkesir(Bigadiç)-Kütahya(Simav), Demirci-Düvertepe Tunnels, T4 Tunnel (projected) – 2 x 1,932 m
- Antalya, Kaş-Kalkan, Çağlarca Tunnel (projected) – 2 x 1,920 m
- Konya Beltway, Hospital-Kırankaya, T5 Tunnel (projected) – 2 x 1,910 m
- Giresun Ring Road, Gülyalı-Keşap T2 Tunnel (projected) – 2 x 1,865 m
- Ankara, Ulus Cut-Cover Tunnel (projected) – 2 x 1,860 m
- Giresun Ring Road, Gülyalı-Keşap T4 Tunnel (projected) – 2 x 1,749 m
- Antalya, Alanya-Gazipaşa, Kargıcak-Yeşilöz Tunnels, T2 (İsbatlı) Tunnel (projected) – 2 x 1,700 m
- Giresun Ring Road, Gülyalı-Keşap T7 Tunnel (projected) – 2 x 1,672 m
- Antalya, Alanya-Gazipaşa, Kargıcak-Yeşilöz Tunnels, T3 (Demirtaş) Tunnel (projected) – 2 x 1,640 m
- Balıkesir(Bigadiç)-Kütahya(Simav), Demirci-Düvertepe Tunnels, T1 Tunnel (projected) – 2 x 1,592 m
- Antalya, Demre-Kaş, T2 Tunnel (projected) – 2 x 1,590 m
- Giresun Ring Road, Gülyalı-Keşap T17 Tunnel (projected) – 2 x 1,575 m
- Hakkari-Ördekli Tunnels, T1 (projected) – 1 x 1,525 m
- Gümüşhane-Köse, Mount Köse Tunnel (projected) – 1 x 1,500 m
- Mersin(Tarsus)-Adana(Pozantı), Şehitler Tunnel (projected) – 1 x 1,500 m
- Balıkesir(Bigadiç)-Kütahya(Simav), Demirci-Düvertepe Tunnels, T3 Tunnel (projected) – 2 x 1,458 m
- Muğla, Fethiye-Dalaman, Gökçeovacık (North Göcek) Tunnel (projected) – 2 x 1,440 m
- Giresun Ring Road, Gülyalı-Keşap T14 Tunnel (projected) – 2 x 1,375 m
- Fatsa Beltway, T8 Tunnel (projected) – 2 x 1,370 m
- Antalya, Demre-Kaş, T3 Tunnel (projected) – 2 x 1,345 m
- İstanbul(Ağva)-Kocaeli(Kandıra)-Sakarya(Kaynarca) Highway, Tunnel-2 (Kandıra-Avdan) (projected) – 2 x 1,345 m
- Fatsa Beltway, T2 Tunnel (projected) – 2 x 1,310 m
- Giresun Ring Road, Gülyalı-Keşap T6 Tunnel (projected) – 2 x 1,280 m
- Antalya, Demre-Kaş, T4 Tunnel (projected) – 2 x 1,270 m
- Giresun Ring Road, Gülyalı-Keşap T5 Tunnel (projected) – 2 x 1,267 m
- Ardahan, Posof-Türkgözü, Eminbey Tunnel (projected) – 2 x 1,200 m
- Balıkesir(Bigadiç)-Kütahya(Simav), Demirci-Düvertepe Tunnels, T6 Tunnel (projected) – 2 x 1,196 m
- Çanakkale, Eceabat-Kilitbahir, Kilitbahir Tunnel (projected) – 1 x 1,179 m
- Giresun Ring Road, Gülyalı-Keşap T11 Tunnel (projected) – 2 x 1,135 m
- Giresun Ring Road, Gülyalı-Keşap T9 Tunnel (projected) – 2 x 1,108 m
- Fatsa Beltway, T5 Tunnel (projected) – 2 x 1,040 m
- Denizli Beltway, Çamlık Tunnel (projected) – 2 x 1,000 m
- Giresun Ring Road, Gülyalı-Keşap T18 Tunnel (projected) – 2 x 970 m
- Bolu(Mudurnu)-Sakarya(Akyazı), Hisar (T4) Tunnel (projected) – 2 x 970 m
- Bolu(Mudurnu)-Sakarya(Akyazı), Akyar (T5) Tunnel (projected) – 2 x 965 m
- Kahramanmaraş, Elbistan-Ekinözü, Belan Tunnel (projected) – 1 x 960 m
- Giresun Ring Road, Gülyalı-Keşap T21 Tunnel (projected) – 2 x 953 m
- Konya Beltway, Hospital-Kırankaya, T6 Tunnel (projected) – 2 x 900 m
- Bolu, Mudurnu Bypass Road, Mudurnu Tunnel (projected) – 2 x 896 m
- İstanbul(Ağva)-Kocaeli(Kandıra)-Sakarya(Kaynarca) Highway, Tunnel-1 (Kandıra-Yağcılar) (projected) – 2 x 870 m
- Istanbul, Haliç Subsea Tunnel (projected) – 2 x 850 m
- Konya Beltway, Seydişehir-Beyşehir, T3 Tunnel (projected) – 2 x 790 m
- Trabzon Bypass Road, Gölçayır-2 Tunnel (projected) – 2 x 744 m
- Hakkari-Ördekli Tunnels, T4 (projected) – 1 x 730 m
- Konya Beltway, Sille-İmar1, T4 Tunnel (projected) – 2 x 720 m
- Konya Beltway, Çayırbağ-Seydişehir, T1 Tunnel (projected) – 2 x 705 m
- Giresun Ring Road, Gülyalı-Keşap T1 Tunnel (projected) – 2 x 670 m
- Rize, Hemşin-Çamlıhemşin T3 Tunnel (projected) – 1 x 662 m
- Antalya(Gazipaşa)-Karaman(Ermenek), Şahinler Tunnel (projected) – 1 x 640 m
- Antalya, Manavgat-Akseki, Kızıldağ (T2) Tunnel (projected) – 2 x 620 m
- Fatsa Beltway, T7 Tunnel (projected) – 2 x 590 m
- Bolu(Mudurnu)-Sakarya(Akyazı), Topçamlığı (T3) Tunnel (projected) – 2 x 500 m
- Gümüşhane(Kürtün)-Trabzon(Tonya), T3 Tunnel (projected) – 1 x 480 m
- Hakkari-Ördekli Tunnels, T2 (projected) – 1 x 480 m
- Gümüşhane-Kelkit, Pirahmet Tunnel (projected) – 2 x 463 m
- Balıkesir(Bigadiç)-Kütahya(Simav), Demirci-Düvertepe Tunnels, T5 Tunnel (projected) – 2 x 459 m
- Hakkari-Ördekli Tunnels, T3 (projected) – 1 x 450 m
- Trabzon Bypass Road, Gölçayır-1 Tunnel (projected) – 2 x 436 m
- Antalya, Demre-Kaş, Cut-Cover (Hoyran) Tunnel (projected) – 2 x 400 m
- Bolu(Mudurnu)-Sakarya(Akyazı), Tavşansuyu (T6) Tunnel (projected) – 2 x 395 m
- Giresun Ring Road, Gülyalı-Keşap T12 Tunnel (projected) – 2 x 388 m
- Kayseri, Şehit Tümgeneral Aydoğan Aydın Tunnel (projected) – 2 x 375 m
- Ardahan(Posof), Binbaşı Eminbey Cut-Cover Tunnel (projected) – 2 x 350 m
- Gümüşhane(Kürtün)-Trabzon(Tonya), T1 Tunnel (projected) – 1 x 300 m
- Gümüşhane(Kürtün)-Trabzon(Tonya), T2 Tunnel (projected) – 1 x 260 m
- Antalya, Kaş-Kalkan, Çukurbağ Tunnel (projected) – 2 x 250 m
- Trabzon Bypass Road, Çukurçayır-2 Tunnel (projected) – 2 x 219 m
- Bolu(Mudurnu)-Sakarya(Akyazı), Allıbelen (T1) Tunnel (projected) – 2 x 200 m
- Fatsa Beltway, T4 Tunnel (projected) – 2 x 190 m
- Fatsa Beltway, T6 Tunnel (projected) – 2 x 190 m
- Balıkesir, İvrindi-Havran, Evciler Tunnel (projected) – 2 x 171 m
- Giresun Ring Road, Gülyalı-Keşap T10 Tunnel (projected) – 2 x 90 m
- Bolu(Mudurnu)-Sakarya(Akyazı), Mudurnu-Akyazı Cut-Cover Tunnel (projected) – 2 x 57 m

== Inactive road tunnels ==
- Antalya-Beldibi, Akyarlar Tunnel (inactive) – 1 x 324 m
- Artvin-Yusufeli, Oruçlu Tunnel – 1 x 300 m
- İstanbul, Beylerbeyi Palace Tunnel (inactive) – 1 x 150 m
- Antalya-Beldibi, Çamdağ Tunnel (inactive) – 1 x 130 m

== Road-rail tunnels ==
- Great Istanbul Tunnel, Bosphorus Subsea Three Layered Tunnel (projected) – 3 x 4,300 m
- İzmir Ring Road, İZKARAY Subsea Road-Rail Tunnel (projected) – 3 x 1,797 m

== Motorway tunnels ==
- KMO 5. Section, Kocaeli T2 Motorway Tunnel – 2 x 4,159 m
- İstanbul Habibler-Hasdal, Cebeci Motorway Tunnel – 2 x 4,005 m
- Bursa-Yalova, Orhangazi (Samanlı) Motorway Tunnel – 2 x 3,591 m
- Bolu-Düzce(Kaynaşlı), Mount Bolu Motorway Tunnel – 2 x 3,125 m
- İzmir(Belevi)-Aydın(Germencik), Selatin Motorway Tunnel – 2 x 3,043 m
- Osmaniye(Bahçe), Kızlaç Motorway Tunnel – 2 x 2,860 m
- KMO 5. Section, Kocaeli T4 Motorway Tunnel - 2 x 2,150 m
- İstanbul, Çatalca-1 Motorway Tunnel - 2 x 2,145 m
- İzmir, Bayraklı-2 Motorway Tunnel – 2 x 1,876 m
- İzmir, Belkahve Motorway Tunnel – 2 x 1,653 m
- KMO 5. Section, Kocaeli T5 Motorway Tunnel – 2 x 1,475 m
- KMO 5. Section, Kocaeli T1 Motorway Tunnel – 2 x 1,405 m
- Bursa, Selçukgazi Motorway Tunnel – 2 x 1,303 m
- Gaziantep(Nurdağı), Aslanlı Motorway Tunnel – 2 x 1,230 m
- Kocaeli, Korutepe Motorway Tunnel – 2 x 1,088 m
- Niğde-Adana, Kırkgeçit-1 Motorway Tunnel – 2 x 958 m
- İzmir, Menemen-Çandarlı, Buruncuk Motorway Tunnel – 2 x 946 m
- Niğde-Adana, Kırkgeçit-6 Motorway Tunnel – 2 x 855 m
- İstanbul, Riva Motorway Tunnel – 2 x 782 m
- İstanbul, Çamlık Motorway Tunnel – 2 x 653 m
- Niğde-Adana, Kırkgeçit-5 Motorway Tunnel – 2 x 652 m
- Kocaeli, Gültepe Motorway Tunnel – 2 x 639 m
- Niğde-Adana, Kırkgeçit-4 Motorway Tunnel – 2 x 630 m
- Osmaniye(Bahçe), Ayran Motorway Tunnel – 2 x 596 m
- İstanbul, Çatalca-2 Motorway Tunnel – 2 x 593 m
- Niğde-Adana, Kırkgeçit-2 Motorway Tunnel - 2 x 584 m
- Niğde-Adana, Kırkgeçit-7 Motorway Tunnel – 2 x 534 m
- Bursa(Gürsu), İğdir Motorway Tunnel – 2 x 518 m
- Adana(Pozantı), Çakıt Motorway Tunnel – 2 x 497 m
- Kocaeli, İzmit West Motorway Tunnel – 2 x 435 m
- Osmaniye(Bahçe), Taşoluk Motorway Tunnel – 2 x 376 m
- KMO 5. Section, Kocaeli T3 Motorway Tunnel – 2 x 371 m
- İzmir, Bayraklı-1 Motorway Tunnel – 2 x 320 m
- İstanbul, Harp Akademileri Motorway Tunnel – 2 x 315 m
- Adana, Fehmi Özeltürkay (Mahfesığmaz) Cut-Cover Motorway Tunnel – 2 x 300 m
- Niğde-Adana, Kırkgeçit-3 Motorway Tunnel – 2 x 286 m
- Kocaeli, Hereke Motorway Tunnel – 2 x 285 m
- Kocaeli, Diliskelesi (Dilovası/Dilderesi) Motorway Tunnel – 2 x 220 m
- Adana, Gülek Motorway Tunnel – 2 x 200 m
- Hatay, İskenderun Motorway Tunnel – 2 x 200 m

== Motorway tunnels (under construction) ==
- Hatay, Dörtyol-Hassa, Amanos Tunnel (under construction) – 2 x 18,800 m
- İskenderun-Antakya Motorway, Belen T1 Motorway Tunnel (under construction) – 2 x 810 m
- İskenderun-Antakya Motorway, Belen T2 Motorway Tunnel (under construction) – 2 x 8,580 m
- Çeşmeli-Kızkalesi Motorway T1 Motorway Tunnel (under construction) – 2 x 793 m
- Çeşmeli-Kızkalesi Motorway T2 Motorway Tunnel (under construction) – 2 x 4,409 m
- Çeşmeli-Kızkalesi Motorway T3 Motorway Tunnel (under construction) – 2 x 658 m
- Çeşmeli-Kızkalesi Motorway T4 Motorway Tunnel (under construction) – 2 x 156 m
- Çeşmeli-Kızkalesi Motorway T5 Motorway Tunnel (under construction) – 2 x 800 m
- Çeşmeli-Kızkalesi Motorway T6 Motorway Tunnel (under construction) – 2 x 2,592 m
- Çeşmeli-Kızkalesi Motorway T7 Motorway Tunnel (under construction) – 2 x 814 m
- Ankara-Samsun Motorway, Elmadağ-Yahşihan, T1 Motorway Tunnel (under construction) – 2 x 1,280 m
- Ankara-Samsun Motorway, Elmadağ-Yahşihan, T2 Motorway Tunnel (under construction) – 2 x 1,255 m
- Ankara-Samsun Motorway, Elmadağ-Yahşihan, T3 Motorway Tunnel (under construction) – 2 x 475 m
- Ankara-Samsun Motorway, Elmadağ-Yahşihan, T4 Motorway Tunnel (under construction) – 2 x 878 m

== Motorway tunnels (projected) ==
- Yalova-İzmit Motorway, Yalova-Elmalık, T1 Motorway Tunnel (projected) – 2 x 942 m
- Yalova-İzmit Motorway, Yalova-Elmalık, T2 Motorway Tunnel (projected) – 2 x 1,045 m
- Yalova-İzmit Motorway, Çukurköy-Gölcük, T1 Motorway Tunnel (projected) – 2 x 480 m
- Yalova-İzmit Motorway, Çukurköy-Gölcük, T2 Motorway Tunnel (projected) – 2 x 880 m
- Yalova-İzmit Motorway, Çukurköy-Gölcük, T3 Motorway Tunnel (projected) – 2 x 1,560 m
- Yalova-İzmit Motorway, Çukurköy-Gölcük, T4 Motorway Tunnel (projected) – 2 x 3,730 m
- Yalova-İzmit Motorway, Gölcük-Bahçecik, T5 Motorway Tunnel (projected) – 2 x 830 m
- Yalova-İzmit Motorway, Bahçecik-Karatepe, T6 Motorway Tunnel (projected) – 2 x 3,155 m
- Kınalı-Balıkesir Motorway, Çorlu Cut-Cover T1 Motorway Tunnel (projected) – 2 x 500 m
- Kınalı-Balıkesir Motorway, Tekirdağ-Malkara, T2 Cut-Cover Motorway Tunnel (projected) – 2 x 500 m
- Kınalı-Balıkesir Motorway, Tekirdağ-Malkara, T1 Motorway Tunnel (projected) – 2 x 1,038 m
- Kınalı-Balıkesir Motorway, Lapseki-Çan, T2 Motorway Tunnel (projected) – 2 x 895 m
- Kınalı-Balıkesir Motorway, Lapseki-Çan, T3 Motorway Tunnel (projected) – 2 x 1,830 m
- Kınalı-Balıkesir Motorway, Çan-Yenice, T4 Motorway Tunnel (projected)– - 2 x 990 m
- Kınalı-Balıkesir Motorway, Yenice-Balya, T5 Motorway Tunnel (projected) – 2 x 2,045 m
- Ankara-Samsun Motorway, Merzifon-Havza, T5 Motorway Tunnel (projected) – 2 x 6,600 m
- Ankara-Samsun Motorway, Merzifon-Havza, T6 Motorway Tunnel (projected) – 2 x 855 m
- Ankara-Samsun Motorway, Havza-Samsun, T7 Motorway Tunnel (projected) – 2 x 2,965 m
- Ankara-Samsun Motorway, Havza-Samsun, T8 Motorway Tunnel (projected) – 2 x 565 m
- Ankara-Samsun Motorway, Havza-Samsun, T9 Motorway Tunnel (projected) – 2 x 1,935 m
- Bafra-Samsun-Ünye Motorway, Bafra-Samsun, T1 Motorway Tunnel (projected) – 2 x 1,240 m
- Bafra-Samsun-Ünye Motorway, Bafra-Samsun, T2 Motorway Tunnel (projected) – 2 x 3,540 m
- Bafra-Samsun-Ünye Motorway, Bafra-Samsun, T3 Motorway Tunnel (projected) – 2 x 480 m
- Bafra-Samsun-Ünye Motorway, Bafra-Samsun, T4 Motorway Tunnel (projected) – 2 x 1,600 m
- Bafra-Samsun-Ünye Motorway, Bafra-Samsun, T5 Motorway Tunnel (projected) – 2 x 1,300 m
- Bafra-Samsun-Ünye Motorway, Bafra-Samsun, T6 Motorway Tunnel (projected) – 2 x 1,000 m
- Bafra-Samsun-Ünye Motorway, Bafra-Samsun, T7 Motorway Tunnel (projected) – 2 x 1,000 m
- Bafra-Samsun-Ünye Motorway, Bafra-Samsun, T8 Motorway Tunnel (projected) – 2 x 1,320 m
- Bafra-Samsun-Ünye Motorway, Bafra-Samsun, T9 Motorway Tunnel (projected) – 2 x 2,360 m
- Bafra-Samsun-Ünye Motorway, Samsun-Ünye, T10 Motorway Tunnel (projected) – 2 x 440 m
- Bafra-Samsun-Ünye Motorway, Samsun-Ünye, T11 Motorway Tunnel (projected) – 2 x 2,360 m
- Bafra-Samsun-Ünye Motorway, Samsun-Ünye, T12 Motorway Tunnel (projected) – 2 x 4,400 m
- Bafra-Samsun-Ünye Motorway, Samsun-Ünye, T13 Motorway Tunnel (projected) – 2 x 5,540 m
- Bafra-Samsun-Ünye Motorway, Samsun-Ünye, T14 Motorway Tunnel (projected) – 2 x 440 m
- Bafra-Samsun-Ünye Motorway, Samsun-Ünye, T15 Motorway Tunnel (projected) – 2 x 380 m
- Bafra-Samsun-Ünye Motorway, Samsun-Ünye, T16 Motorway Tunnel (projected) – 2 x 1,320 m
- Afyon-Antalya Motorway, BurdurNorth-BurdurSouth, T1 (Burdur) Motorway Tunnel (projected) – 2 x 1,615 m
- Afyon-Antalya Motorway, BurdurNorth-BurdurSouth, T2 (MAKÜ) Motorway Tunnel (projected) – 2 x 1,585 m
- Afyon-Antalya Motorway, Burdur-Bucak, T3 Motorway Tunnel (projected) – 2 x 2,000 m
- Afyon-Antalya Motorway, Burdur-Bucak, T4 Motorway Tunnel (projected) – 2 x 865 m
- Afyon-Antalya Motorway, Burdur-Bucak, T5 Motorway Tunnel (projected) – 2 x 580 m
- Afyon-Antalya Motorway, Burdur-Bucak, T6 Motorway Tunnel (projected) – 2 x 1,145 m
- Afyon-Antalya Motorway, Burdur-Bucak, T7 Motorway Tunnel (projected) – 2 x 1,930 m
- Afyon-Antalya Motorway, Bucak-Antalya, T8 Motorway Tunnel (projected) – 2 x 1,185 m
- Afyon-Antalya Motorway, Bucak-Antalya, T9 Motorway Tunnel (projected) – 2 x 310 m
- Afyon-Antalya Motorway, Bucak-Antalya, T10 Motorway Tunnel (projected) – 2 x 1,855 m
- Afyon-Antalya Motorway, Bucak-Antalya, T11 Motorway Tunnel (projected) – 2 x 400 m
- Antalya-Alanya Motorway, Antalya-Taşağıl, T1 Motorway Tunnel (projected) – 2 x 1,070 m
- Antalya-Alanya Motorway, Antalya-Taşağıl, T2 Motorway Tunnel (projected) – 2 x 1,680 m
- Antalya-Alanya Motorway, Antalya-Taşağıl, T3 Motorway Tunnel (projected) – 2 x 1,080 m
- Antalya-Alanya Motorway, Antalya-Taşağıl, T4 Motorway Tunnel (projected) – 2 x 2,220 m
- Antalya-Alanya Motorway, Taşağıl-Manavgat, T5 Motorway Tunnel (projected) – 2 x 560 m
- Antalya-Alanya Motorway, Manavgat T6 Motorway Tunnel (projected) – 2 x 875 m
- Antalya-Alanya Motorway, Manavgat-Alarahan, T7 Motorway Tunnel (projected) – 2 x 805 m
- Antalya-Alanya Motorway, Alarahan-Konaklı, T8 Motorway Tunnel (projected) – 2 x 2,965 m
- Antalya-Alanya Motorway, Konaklı-Alanya, T9 Motorway Tunnel (projected) – 2 x 6,715 m
- Antalya-Alanya Motorway, Konaklı-Alanya, T10 Motorway Tunnel (projected) – 2 x 4,440 m
- Denizli-Burdur Motorway, Honaz-Çardak, T1 Motorway Tunnel (projected) – 2 x 770 m
- Denizli-Burdur Motorway, Çardak-Burdur, T2 Motorway Tunnel (projected) – 2 x 4,385 m
- Denizli-Burdur Motorway, Çardak-Burdur, T3 Motorway Tunnel (projected) – 2 x 3,115 m
- Denizli-Burdur Motorway, Burdur-Bucak, T4 Motorway Tunnel (projected) – 2 x 2,220 m
- Gerede-Gürbulak Motorway, Gerede-Merzifon Section, Gerede-Eskipazar, T1 Motorway Tunnel (projected) – 2 x 3,130 m
- Gerede-Gürbulak Motorway, Gerede-Merzifon Section, Gerede-Eskipazar, T2 Motorway Tunnel (projected) – 2 x 260 m
- Gerede-Gürbulak Motorway, Gerede-Merzifon Section, Eskipazar-Çerkeş, T3 Motorway Tunnel (projected) – 2 x 4,080 m
- Gerede-Gürbulak Motorway, Gerede-Merzifon Section, Eskipazar-Çerkeş, T4 Motorway Tunnel (projected) – 2 x 345 m
- Gerede-Gürbulak Motorway, Gerede-Merzifon Section, Kurşunlu-Ilgaz, T5 Motorway Tunnel (projected)– - 2 x 1,570 m
- Gerede-Gürbulak Motorway, Gerede-Merzifon Section, Ilgaz-Tosya, T6 Motorway Tunnel (projected) – 2 x 140 m
- Gerede-Gürbulak Motorway, Gerede-Merzifon Section, Ilgaz-Tosya, T7 Motorway Tunnel (projected) – 2 x 515 m
- Gerede-Gürbulak Motorway, Gerede-Merzifon Section, Ilgaz-Tosya, T8 Motorway Tunnel (projected) – 2 x 1,205 m
- Gerede-Gürbulak Motorway, Gerede-Merzifon Section, Ilgaz-Tosya, T9 Motorway Tunnel (projected) – 2 x 625 m
- Gerede-Gürbulak Motorway, Gerede-Merzifon Section, Ilgaz-Tosya, T10 Motorway Tunnel (projected) – 2 x 370 m
- Gerede-Gürbulak Motorway, Gerede-Merzifon Section, Kargı-Osmancık, T11 Motorway Tunnel (projected) – 2 x 1,000 m
- Gerede-Gürbulak Motorway, Gerede-Merzifon Section, Kargı-Osmancık, T12 Motorway Tunnel (projected) – 2 x 940 m
- Gerede-Gürbulak Motorway, Gerede-Merzifon Section, Kargı-Osmancık, T13 Motorway Tunnel (projected) – 2 x 650 m
- Gerede-Gürbulak Motorway, Gerede-Merzifon Section, Kargı-Osmancık, T14 Motorway Tunnel (projected) – 2 x 325 m
- Gerede-Gürbulak Motorway, Gerede-Merzifon Section, Kargı-Osmancık, T15 Motorway Tunnel (projected) – 2 x 915 m
- Gerede-Gürbulak Motorway, Gerede-Merzifon Section, Kargı-Osmancık, T16 Motorway Tunnel (projected) – 2 x 5,450 m
- Gerede-Gürbulak Motorway, Gerede-Merzifon Section, Kargı-Osmancık, T17 Motorway Tunnel (projected) – 2 x 2,805 m
- Gerede-Gürbulak Motorway, Gerede-Merzifon Section, Kargı-Osmancık, T18 Motorway Tunnel (projected) – 2 x 465 m
- Gerede-Gürbulak Motorway, Gerede-Merzifon Section, Kargı-Osmancık, T19 Motorway Tunnel (projected) – 2 x 870 m
- Gerede-Gürbulak Motorway, Gerede-Merzifon Section, Kargı-Osmancık, T20 Motorway Tunnel (projected) – 2 x 855 m
- Gerede-Gürbulak Motorway, Gerede-Merzifon Section, Kargı-Osmancık, T21 Motorway Tunnel (projected) – 2 x 3,795 m
- Gerede-Gürbulak Motorway, Gerede-Merzifon Section, Kargı-Osmancık, T22 Motorway Tunnel (projected) – 2 x 2,515 m
- Gerede-Gürbulak Motorway, Gerede-Merzifon Section, Kargı-Osmancık, T23 Motorway Tunnel (projected) – 2 x 4,035 m
- Gerede-Gürbulak Motorway, Merzifon-Koyulhisar Section, Amasya T1 Motorway Tunnel (projected) – 2 x 472 m
- Gerede-Gürbulak Motorway, Merzifon-Koyulhisar Section, Amasya T2 Motorway Tunnel (projected) – 2 x 3,091 m
- Gerede-Gürbulak Motorway, Merzifon-Koyulhisar Section, Amasya T3 Motorway Tunnel (projected) – 2 x 730 m
- Gerede-Gürbulak Motorway, Merzifon-Koyulhisar Section, Amasya T4 Motorway Tunnel (projected) – 2 x 304 m
- Gerede-Gürbulak Motorway, Merzifon-Koyulhisar Section, Amasya T5 Motorway Tunnel (projected) – 2 x 1,281 m
- Gerede-Gürbulak Motorway, Merzifon-Koyulhisar Section, Turhal T6 Motorway Tunnel (projected) – 2 x 1,221 m
- Gerede-Gürbulak Motorway, Merzifon-Koyulhisar Section, Turhal T7 Motorway Tunnel (projected) – 2 x 1,202 m
- Gerede-Gürbulak Motorway, Merzifon-Koyulhisar Section, Turhal T8 Motorway Tunnel (projected) – 2 x 2,500 m
- Gerede-Gürbulak Motorway, Merzifon-Koyulhisar Section, Turhal T9 Motorway Tunnel (projected) – 2 x 368 m
- Gerede-Gürbulak Motorway, Merzifon-Koyulhisar Section, Turhal T10 Motorway Tunnel (projected) – 2 x 2,113 m
- Gerede-Gürbulak Motorway, Merzifon-Koyulhisar Section, Turhal T11 Motorway Tunnel (projected) – 2 x 3,710 m
- Gerede-Gürbulak Motorway, Merzifon-Koyulhisar Section, Tokat T12 Motorway Tunnel (projected) – 2 x 3,217 m
- Gerede-Gürbulak Motorway, Merzifon-Koyulhisar Section, Tokat T13 Motorway Tunnel (projected) – 2 x 1,036 m
- Gerede-Gürbulak Motorway, Merzifon-Koyulhisar Section, Tokat T14 Motorway Tunnel (projected) – 2 x 5,525 m
- Gerede-Gürbulak Motorway, Merzifon-Koyulhisar Section, Almus T15 Motorway Tunnel (projected) – 2 x 3,160 m
- Gerede-Gürbulak Motorway, Merzifon-Koyulhisar Section, Almus T16 Motorway Tunnel (projected) – 2 x 2,119 m
- Gerede-Gürbulak Motorway, Merzifon-Koyulhisar Section, Almus T17 Motorway Tunnel (projected) – 2 x 2,697 m
- Gerede-Gürbulak Motorway, Merzifon-Koyulhisar Section, Almus T18 Motorway Tunnel (projected) – 2 x 4,048 m
- Gerede-Gürbulak Motorway, Merzifon-Koyulhisar Section, Reşadiye T19 Motorway Tunnel (projected) – 2 x 799 m
- Gerede-Gürbulak Motorway, Merzifon-Koyulhisar Section, Reşadiye T20 Motorway Tunnel (projected) – 2 x 473 m
- Gerede-Gürbulak Motorway, Merzifon-Koyulhisar Section, Reşadiye T21 Motorway Tunnel (projected) – 2 x 363 m
- Gerede-Gürbulak Motorway, Merzifon-Koyulhisar Section, Reşadiye T22 Motorway Tunnel (projected) – 2 x 762 m
- Gerede-Gürbulak Motorway, Merzifon-Koyulhisar Section, Reşadiye T23 Motorway Tunnel (projected) – 2 x 323 m
- Gerede-Gürbulak Motorway, Merzifon-Koyulhisar Section, Reşadiye T24 Motorway Tunnel (projected) – 2 x 344 m
- Gerede-Gürbulak Motorway, Merzifon-Koyulhisar Section, Doğanşar T25 Motorway Tunnel (projected) – 2 x 7,788 m
- Gerede-Gürbulak Motorway, Merzifon-Koyulhisar Section, Koyulhisar T26 Motorway Tunnel (projected) – 2 x 1,520 m
- Gerede-Gürbulak Motorway, Merzifon-Koyulhisar Section, Koyulhisar T27 Motorway Tunnel (projected) – 2 x 849 m
- Gerede-Gürbulak Motorway, Merzifon-Koyulhisar Section, Koyulhisar T28 Motorway Tunnel (projected) – 2 x 706 m
- Gerede-Gürbulak Motorway, Merzifon-Koyulhisar Section, Koyulhisar T29 Motorway Tunnel (projected) – 2 x 849 m
- Gerede-Gürbulak Motorway, Merzifon-Koyulhisar Section, Koyulhisar T30 Motorway Tunnel (projected) – 2 x 1,583 m
- Gerede-Gürbulak Motorway, Koyulhisar-Pülümür Section, Koyulhisar-Suşehri, T1 Motorway Tunnel (projected) – 2 x 2,750 m
- Gerede-Gürbulak Motorway, Koyulhisar-Pülümür Section, Koyulhisar-Suşehri, T2 Motorway Tunnel (projected) – 2 x 4,550 m
- Gerede-Gürbulak Motorway, Koyulhisar-Pülümür Section, Koyulhisar-Suşehri, T3 Motorway Tunnel (projected) – 2 x 8,000 m
- Gerede-Gürbulak Motorway, Koyulhisar-Pülümür Section, Gölova-Sivas, T4 Motorway Tunnel (projected) – 2 x 1,600 m
- Gerede-Gürbulak Motorway, Koyulhisar-Pülümür Section, Gölova-Sivas, T5 Motorway Tunnel (projected) – 2 x 4,300 m
- Gerede-Gürbulak Motorway, Koyulhisar-Pülümür Section, Sivas-Refahiye, T6 Motorway Tunnel (projected) – 2 x 4,900 m
- Gerede-Gürbulak Motorway, Koyulhisar-Pülümür Section, Refahiye-Kemah, T7 Motorway Tunnel (projected) – 2 x 2,100 m
- Gerede-Gürbulak Motorway, Koyulhisar-Pülümür Section, Refahiye-Kemah, T8 Motorway Tunnel (projected) – 2 x 2,350 m
- Gerede-Gürbulak Motorway, Koyulhisar-Pülümür Section, Refahiye-Kemah, T9 Motorway Tunnel (projected) – 2 x 3,100 m
- Gerede-Gürbulak Motorway, Koyulhisar-Pülümür Section, Refahiye-Kemah, T10 Motorway Tunnel (projected) – 2 x 4,250 m
- Gerede-Gürbulak Motorway, Koyulhisar-Pülümür Section, Refahiye-Kemah, T11 Motorway Tunnel (projected) – 2 x 450 m
- Gerede-Gürbulak Motorway, Koyulhisar-Pülümür Section, Refahiye-Kemah, T12 Motorway Tunnel (projected) – 2 x 4,200 m
- Gerede-Gürbulak Motorway, Koyulhisar-Pülümür Section, Refahiye-Kemah, T13 Motorway Tunnel (projected) – 2 x 6,350 m
- Gerede-Gürbulak Motorway, Koyulhisar-Pülümür Section, Kemah-Erzincan, T14 Motorway Tunnel (projected) – 2 x 1,000 m
- Gerede-Gürbulak Motorway, Koyulhisar-Pülümür Section, Kemah-Erzincan, T15 Motorway Tunnel (projected) – 2 x 250 m
- Gerede-Gürbulak Motorway, Koyulhisar-Pülümür Section, Kemah-Erzincan, T16 Motorway Tunnel (projected) – 2 x 800 m
- Gerede-Gürbulak Motorway, Koyulhisar-Pülümür Section, Kemah-Erzincan, T17 Motorway Tunnel (projected) – 2 x 750 m
- Gerede-Gürbulak Motorway, Koyulhisar-Pülümür Section, Kemah-Erzincan, T18 Motorway Tunnel (projected) – 2 x 400 m
- Gerede-Gürbulak Motorway, Koyulhisar-Pülümür Section, Kemah-Erzincan, T19 Motorway Tunnel (projected) – 2 x 600 m
- Gerede-Gürbulak Motorway, Koyulhisar-Pülümür Section, Kemah-Erzincan, T20 Motorway Tunnel (projected) – 2 x 200 m
- Gerede-Gürbulak Motorway, Koyulhisar-Pülümür Section, Kemah-Erzincan, T21 Motorway Tunnel (projected) – 2 x 500 m
- Gerede-Gürbulak Motorway, Koyulhisar-Pülümür Section, Kemah-Erzincan, T22 Motorway Tunnel (projected) – 2 x 5,710 m
- Gerede-Gürbulak Motorway, Koyulhisar-Pülümür Section, Erzincan-Pülümür, T23 Motorway Tunnel (projected) – 2 x 7,960 m
- Gerede-Gürbulak Motorway, Koyulhisar-Pülümür Section, Erzincan-Pülümür, T24 Motorway Tunnel (projected) – 2 x 5,600 m
- Gerede-Gürbulak Motorway, Koyulhisar-Pülümür Section, Erzincan-Pülümür, T25 Motorway Tunnel (projected) – 2 x 3,020 m
- Gerede-Gürbulak Motorway, Pülümür-Horasan Section, Pülümür-Kargın, T1 Motorway Tunnel (projected) – 2 x 4,500 m
- Gerede-Gürbulak Motorway, Pülümür-Horasan Section, Tercan-Aşkale, T2 Motorway Tunnel (projected) – 2 x 4,000 m
- Gerede-Gürbulak Motorway, Pülümür-Horasan Section, Tercan-Aşkale, T3 Motorway Tunnel (projected) – 2 x 1,750 m
- Gerede-Gürbulak Motorway, Pülümür-Horasan Section, Tercan-Aşkale, T4 Motorway Tunnel (projected) – 2 x 4,400 m
- Gerede-Gürbulak Motorway, Pülümür-Horasan Section, Tercan-Aşkale, T5 Motorway Tunnel (projected) – 2 x 2,600 m
- Gerede-Gürbulak Motorway, Pülümür-Horasan Section, Tercan-Aşkale, T6 Motorway Tunnel (projected) – 2 x 1,500 m
- Gerede-Gürbulak Motorway, Pülümür-Horasan Section, Tercan-Aşkale, T7 Motorway Tunnel (projected) – 2 x 1,450 m
- Gerede-Gürbulak Motorway, Pülümür-Horasan Section, Tercan-Aşkale, T8 Motorway Tunnel (projected) – 2 x 5,350 m
- Gerede-Gürbulak Motorway, Pülümür-Horasan Section, Erzurum-Pasinler, T9 Motorway Tunnel (projected) – 2 x 5,700 m
- Gerede-Gürbulak Motorway, Horasan-Gürbulak Section, Horasan-Eleşkirt, T1 Motorway Tunnel (projected) – 2 x 1,600 m
- Ankara-İzmir Motorway, Sivrihisar T1 Motorway Tunnel (projected)– - 2 x 2,929 m
- Ankara-İzmir Motorway, Çifteler-Seyitgazi, T2 (Börüklü) Motorway Tunnel (projected) – 2 x 1,255
- Ankara-İzmir Motorway, Seyitgazi-Altıntaş, T3 Motorway Tunnel (projected) – 2 x 1,061 m
- Ankara-İzmir Motorway, Seyitgazi-Altıntaş, T4 Motorway Tunnel (projected) – 2 x 2,688 m
- Ankara-İzmir Motorway, Dumlupınar-Banaz, T5 Motorway Tunnel (projected) – 2 x 3,757 m
- Ankara-İzmir Motorway, Uşak-Kula, T6 Motorway Tunnel (projected) – 2 x 2,700 m
- Ankara-İzmir Motorway, Uşak-Kula, T7 Motorway Tunnel (projected) – 2 x 1,728 m
- Ankara-İzmir Motorway, Kula T8 Motorway Tunnel (projected) – 2 x 2,823 m
- Ankara-İzmir Motorway, Kula-Adala(Salihli), T9 Motorway Tunnel (projected) – 2 x 4,637 m
- Ankara-İzmir Motorway, Adala(Salihli)-Gölmarmara, T10 Motorway Tunnel (projected) – 2 x 3,069 m
- Ankara-İzmir Motorway, Gölmarmara-Ahmetli, T11 Motorway Tunnel (projected) – 2 x 2,770 m
- Ankara-İzmir Motorway, Ahmetli-Turgutlu, T12 Motorway Tunnel (projected) – 2 x 857 m
- İzmir 2. Ring Road, T1 Motorway Tunnel (projected) – 2 x 1,280 m
- İzmir 2. Ring Road, T2 Motorway Tunnel (projected) – 2 x 3,230 m
- İzmir 2. Ring Road, T3 Motorway Tunnel (projected) – 2 x 1,656 m
- İzmir 2. Ring Road, T4 Motorway Tunnel (projected) – 2 x 447 m
- İzmir 2. Ring Road, T5 Motorway Tunnel (projected) – 2 x 2,555 m
- İzmir 2. Ring Road, T6 Motorway Tunnel (projected) – 2 x 2,027 m
- İzmir 2. Ring Road, T7 Motorway Tunnel (projected) – 2 x 1,390 m
- İzmir 2. Ring Road, T8 Motorway Tunnel (projected) – 2 x 1,570 m
- İzmir 2. Ring Road, T9 Motorway Tunnel (projected) – 2 x 4,070 m
- İzmir 2. Ring Road, T10 Motorway Tunnel (projected) – 2 x 1,062 m
- İzmir 2. Ring Road, Cut-Cover Motorway Tunnel (projected) – 2 x 963 m
- Sivrihisar-Bursa Motorway, Bozüyük-Pekmezli, T1 Cut-Cover Motorway Tunnel (projected) – 2 x 670 m
- Sivrihisar-Bursa Motorway, Bozüyük-Pekmezli, T2 Motorway Tunnel (projected)– - 2 x 3,560 m
- Çeşmeli-Taşucu Motorway, Silifke Motorway Tunnel (projected) – 2 x 1,570 m
- Şanlıurfa-Habur Motorway, T1 Motorway Tunnel (projected) – 2 x 1,487 m
- Şanlıurfa-Habur Motorway, T2 Cut-Cover Motorway Tunnel (projected) – 2 x 890 m
- Bursa Northern Ring Road, Ovaaakça Motorway Tunnel (projected) – 2 x 2,144 m
- Bursa Northern Ring Road, Çağrışan Motorway Tunnel (projected) – 2 x 349 m
- Bursa Northern Ring Road, Bademli Motorway Tunnel (projected) – 2 x 670 m
- Adana Northern Ring Road, T1 Motorway Tunnel (projected) – 2 x 1,670 m
- Adana Northern Ring Road, T2 Motorway Tunnel (projected) – 2 x 690 m
- Adana Northern Ring Road, T3 Motorway Tunnel (projected) – 2 x 880 m
- Adana Northern Ring Road, T4 Motorway Tunnel (projected) – 2 x 350 m
- Adana Northern Ring Road, T5 (Toros) Motorway Tunnel (projected) – 2 x 12,090 m
- Adana Northern Ring Road, T6 Motorway Tunnel (projected) – 2 x 470 m
- Adana Northern Ring Road, T7 Motorway Tunnel (projected) – 2 x 600 m
- Adana Northern Ring Road, T8 Motorway Tunnel (projected) – 2 x 480 m
- Adana Northern Ring Road, T9 Motorway Tunnel (projected) – 2 x 2,380 m

== Railway tunnels ==
- Amanos Railway Tunnel (under construction) – 18,900 m
- Nurdağı Tunnel (under construction) – 10,200 m
- Ayaş Tunnel (under construction) – 10,064 m
- Doğançay HSR Tunnel (under construction) – 7,470 m
- Çayırhan HSR Tunnel – 7,110 m
- İnönü-Vezirhan HSR Tunnel (under construction) – 6,100 m
- Deliktaş Tunnel – 5,473 m
- Afyonkarahisar, Köroğlubeli HSR Tunnel (under construction) – 5,200 m
- İstanbul-Ankara HSR Tunnel-36 – 4,100 m
- İstanbul-Ankara HSR Tunnel-15 – 3,934 m
- İstanbul-Ankara HSR Tunnel-8 – 3,816 m
- Konya HSR Tunnel – 2,030 m
- İzmir, Şirinyer Rail Tunnel – 2,000 m
- Marmaray (subsea) – 1,800 m
- İstanbul, Karaköy Funicular Tunnel – 573 m

== Water tunnels ==
- Bolu, Gerede Water Tunnel – 1 x 31,592 m
- Hadimi Water Tunnel (under construction) – 1 x 18,136 m
- Şanlıurfa Irrigation Tunnels – 2 x 26,400 m
- Şanlıurfa, Suruç Water Tunnel – 1 x 17,185 m
- Blue Tunnel – 1 x 17,034 m
- Northern Cyprus Water Tunnel (under construction) – 1 x 5,700 m
- Bosporus Water Tunnel – 1 x 5,551 m
- Gaziantep(Nurdağı), Belpınar Water Tunnel – 1 x 5,450 m

== See also ==
- List of tunnels by location
- List of motorway tunnels in Turkey
