= Sarıyer–Çayırbaşı Tunnel =

Road tunnel in Istanbul, Turkey

Sarıyer–Çayırbaşı Tunnel Sarıyer–Çayırbaşı Tüneli
- Interactive map of Sarıyer–Çayırbaşı Tunnel; Sarıyer–Çayırbaşı Tüneli

Overview
- Location: Sarıyer – Çayırbaşı, Sarıyer (Istanbul, Turkey)

Operation
- Opened: 8 September 2012; 13 years ago
- Owner: Istanbul Metropolitan Municipality
- Traffic: automotive

Technical
- Length: 2,012 m (6,601 ft) (east bound); 2,012 m (6,601 ft) (west bound)
- No. of lanes: 2 × 2
- Operating speed: 70 km/h (43 mph)
- Tunnel clearance: 8 m (26 ft)
- Width: 12 m (39 ft)

Location of Sarıyer–Çayırbaşı Tunnel in Istanbul

The Sarıyer–Çayırbaşı Tunnel (Turkish: Sarıyer–Çayırbaşı Tüneli) is a twin-tube road tunnel under the northern suburbs of Istanbul, Turkey connecting Sarıyer district and Çayırbaşı neighborhood in the same district. The 2,012 m (1.250 mi) long tunnel was opened in 2012.

The tunnel is part of a project of the Istanbul Metropolitan Municipality to build seven tunnels for the "City of Seven Hills", which is the nickname of Istanbul. It was opened on 8 September 2012 as the third tunnel of this project following the Kağıthane–Piyalepaşa Tunnel and Dolmabahçe–Bomonti Tunnel. Its south entry is situated in Hacıosman Bayırı at Çayırbaşı neighborhood while the northern entry is located in Kilyos Street in Sarıyer. Each of the twin tubes of the tunnel is 12 m (39 ft) wide, 8 m (26 ft) high and 2,012 m (1.250 mi) long.
