= Göcek Tunnel =

Road tunnel in Muğla, Turkey

Göcek Tunnel Göcek Tüneli
- Interactive map of Göcek Tunnel; Göcek Tüneli

Overview
- Location: Fethiye, Muğla, Turkey
- Coordinates: 36°45′46.5″N 28°53′51.2″E
- Status: Operational
- Route: D.400
- Start: Göcek, Fethiye
- End: Dalaman

Operation
- Work began: 10 March 2004
- Opened: 9 September 2006
- Traffic: automotive
- Character: Twin-tube highway tunnel
- Toll: ₺7 (automobiles) ₺2,50 (motorcycles) ₺10 (2-axle vehicles with longer than 3.20 meters axle spacing) ₺14 (3-axle vehicles) ₺22 (4-axle and 5-axle vehicles)

Technical
- Length: 926 m
- No. of lanes: 2 × 2
- Operating speed: 50 km/h
- Tunnel clearance: 7.40 m
- Width: 12 m

Göcek Tüneli (Turkish: Göcek Tüneli) is a road tunnel in Dalaman, Muğla. The tunnel goes through D400 road. It takes its name from Göcek. It was opened on 9 September 2006, by the president of the term Recep Tayyip Erdoğan. The tunnel was built as a single tube in the first phase. In 2015, the second tube section was built by the state for 65 million liras in the then currency.
