= Dolmabahçe–Bomonti Tunnel =

Road tunnel in Istanbul, Turkey

Dolmabahçe–Bomonti Tunnel Dolmabahçe–Bomonti Tüneli
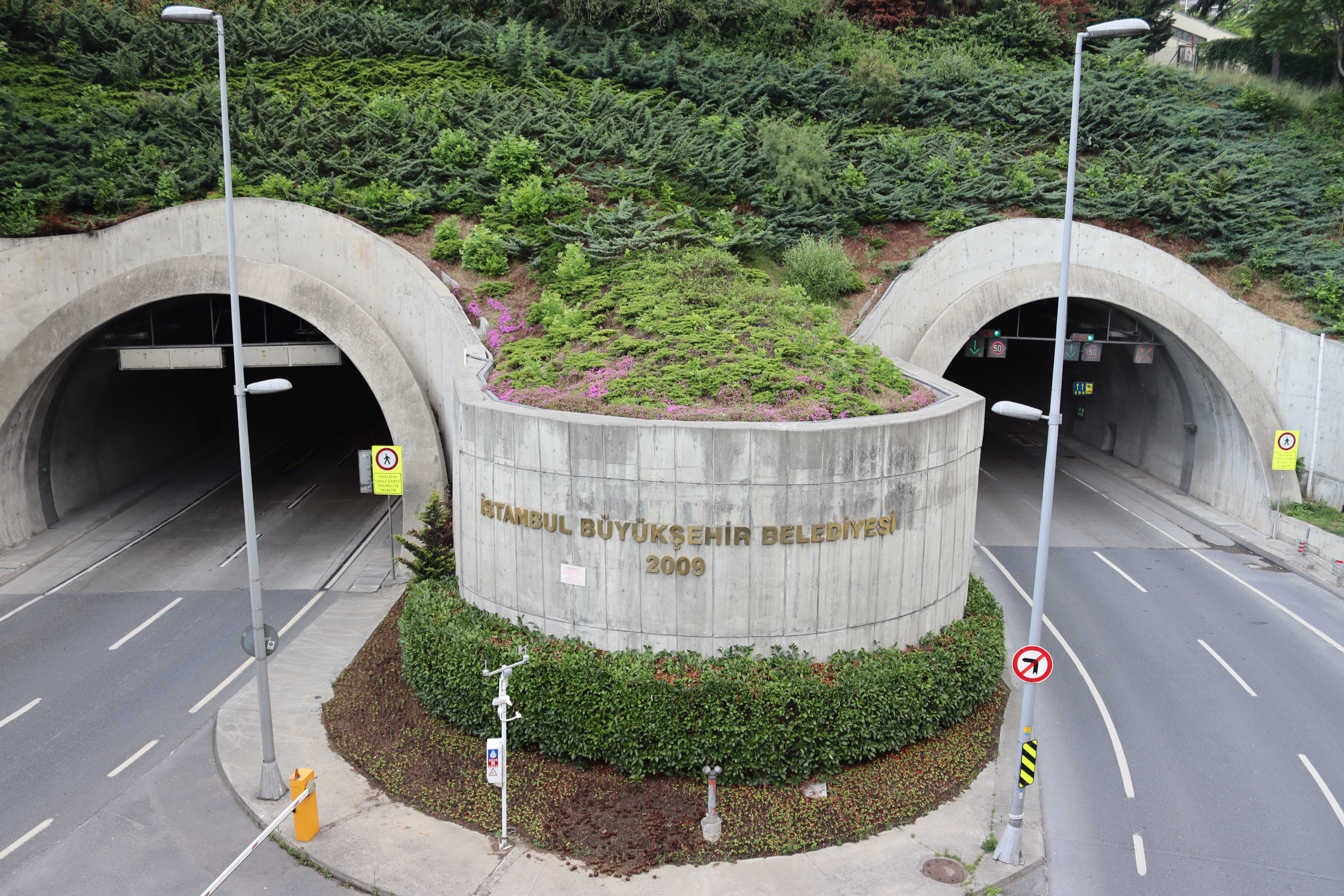
- Interactive map of Dolmabahçe–Bomonti Tunnel; Dolmabahçe–Bomonti Tüneli

Overview
- Location: Dolmabahçe, Beşiktaş – Bomonti, Şişli (Istanbul, Turkey)
- Coordinates: 41.04193°N 28.99298°E 41.05854°N 28.97642°E

Operation
- Work began: 2007
- Opened: 14 June 2010; 16 years ago
- Owner: Istanbul Metropolitan Municipality
- Traffic: Automotive

Technical
- Length: 2,360–2,390 m (7,740–7,840 ft)
- No. of lanes: 2x2
- Operating speed: 70 km/h (43 mph)

Location of Dolmabahçe–Bomonti Tunnel in Istanbul

The Dolmabahçe–Bomonti Tunnel (Turkish: Dolmabahçe–Bomonti Tüneli) is a twin-tube road tunnel under the inner city of Istanbul, Turkey connecting the neighborhood of Dolmabahçe in Beşiktaş district and Bomonti in Şişli district. Opened in 2010, it is 2,360–2,390 m (7,740–7,840 ft) long and under 40 m (130 ft) underground. The tunnel cost an estimated ₺248,700,000.

The tunnel was part of a project of the Istanbul Metropolitan Municipality to build seven tunnels for the "City of Seven Hills", the nickname of Istanbul. It was opened on 14 June 2010 as the second tunnel of this project following the Kağıthane–Piyalepaşa Tunnel after a construction time of three years. Its southeast entry is situated north of the Beşiktaş Stadium in Dolmabahçe. It runs under the neighborhoods Taksim and Feriköy, and the northwest entry is located in Bomonti. The two independent tubes with two lanes each are 2,360 m (1.47 mi) and 2,390 m (1.49 mi) long. The tunnel is linked with the Kağıthane–Piyalepaşa Tunnel over a connection road of 500–600 m (1,600–2,000 ft) between Bomonti and Piyalepaşa.

By using both tunnels, the driving time between Dolmabahçe and Kağıthane during rush hours drops from 45 to 5 minutes at a driving speed of about 70 km/h (43 mph).
