= Bayramca Tunnel =

Road tunnel in Turkey

Bayramca Tunnel Bayramca Tüneli
- Interactive map of Bayramca Tunnel; Bayramca Tüneli

Overview
- Location: Ünye, Ordu Province
- Coordinates: 41°06′51″N 37°16′58″E Location of Bayramca Tunnel in Turkey
- Status: Operational
- Route: D.010 E70

Operation
- Work began: 2007
- Constructed: S.T.Y. Construction Company
- Opened: 21 December 2013; 12 years ago
- Operator: General Directorate of Highways
- Traffic: automotive

Technical
- Length: 691 and 741 m (2,267 and 2,431 ft)
- No. of lanes: 2 x 2
- Operating speed: 80 km/h (50 mph)

Bayramca Tunnel (Turkish: Bayramca Tüneli), is a highway tunnel constructed in Ordu Province, northern Turkey.

Bayramca Tunnel is part of the Samsun-Ordu Highway D.010 E70 within the Black Sea Coastal Highway, of which construction was carried out by the Turkish S.T.Y. Construction Company. The 691 and 741 m (2,267 and 2,431 ft)-long twin-tube tunnel carrying two lanes of traffic in each direction. The Yunus Emre Tunnel follows the Bayramca Tunnel in direction Samsun.

The tunnel was opened to traffic on 21 December 2013 by Turkish Prime Minister Recep Tayyip Erdoğan.
