= Yunus Emre Tunnel =

Highway tunnel in northern Turkey

Yunus Emre Tunnel Yunus Emre Tüneli
- Interactive map of Yunus Emre Tunnel; Yunus Emre Tüneli

Overview
- Location: Ünye, Ordu Province
- Coordinates: 41°06′59″N 37°14′18″E Location of Yunus Emre Tunnel in Turkey
- Status: Operational
- Route: D.010 E70

Operation
- Work began: 2007
- Constructed: S.T.Y. Construction Company
- Opened: December 21, 2013; 12 years ago
- Operator: General Directorate of Highways
- Traffic: automotive

Technical
- Length: 1,996 and 1,980 m (6,549 and 6,496 ft)
- No. of lanes: 2 x 2
- Operating speed: 80 km/h (50 mph)

Yunus Emre Tunnel (Turkish: Yunus Emre Tüneli), is a highway tunnel constructed in Ordu Province, northern Turkey.

Yunus Emre Tunnel is part of the Samsun-Ordu Highway (D.010 and E70) within the Black Sea Coastal Highway, of which construction was carried out by the Turkish S.T.Y. Construction Company. The 1,996-and-1,980-metre-long (6,549 and 6,496 ft) twin-tube tunnel carries two lanes of traffic in each direction. The Bayramca Tunnel follows the Yunus Emre Tunnel in direction Ordu.

The tunnel was opened to traffic on December 21, 2013, by Turkish Prime Minister Recep Tayyip Erdoğan.
