= Kiliseburnu Tunnel =

Road tunnel in Turkey

Kiliseburnu Tunnel Kiliseburnu Tüneli
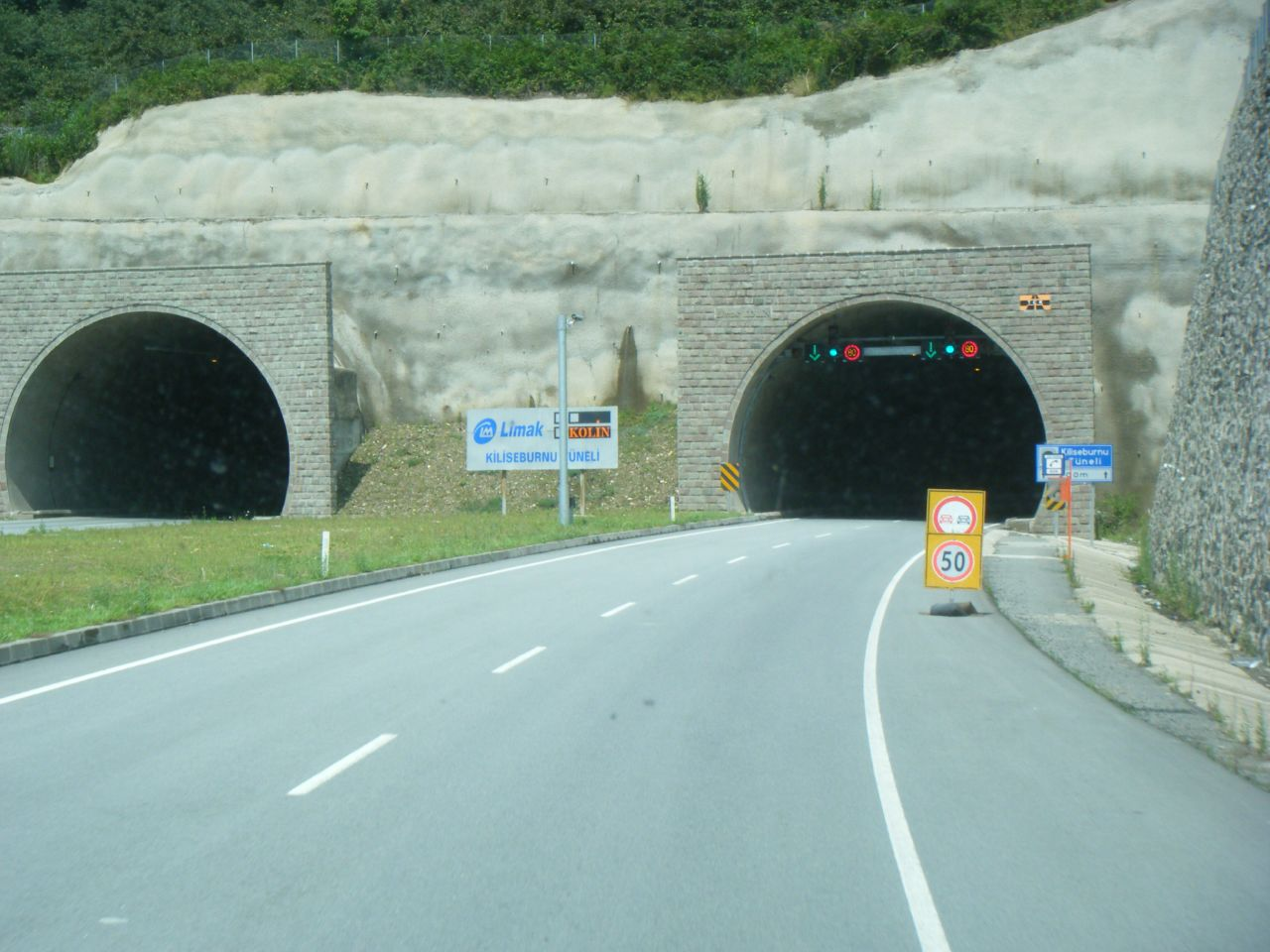
- Interactive map of Kiliseburnu Tunnel; Kiliseburnu Tüneli

Overview
- Location: Tirebolu, Giresun Province
- Coordinates: 40°59′54″N 38°47′45″E Location of Kiliseburnu Tunnel in Turkey
- Status: Operational
- Route: D.010 E70

Operation
- Work began: 2004
- Constructed: Projima Tunnel Construction Company
- Opened: April 7, 2007; 19 years ago
- Operator: General Directorate of Highways
- Traffic: automotive

Technical
- Length: 200 and 195 m (656 and 640 ft)
- No. of lanes: 2 x 2
- Operating speed: 80 km/h (50 mph)

Kiliseburnu Tunnel (Turkish: Kiliseburnu Tüneli), is a highway tunnel constructed in Giresun Province, northern Turkey.

Kiliseburnu Tunnel is part of the Giresun-Trabzon Highway D.010 E70 within the Black Sea Coastal Highway, of which construction was carried out by the Turkish Projima Tunnel Construction Company. The 200 and 195 m (656 and 640 ft)-long twin-tube tunnel carrying two lanes of traffic in each direction is flanked by 367–367 m (1,204–1,204 ft)-long Arıdurak Tunnel in the west and 2,175–2,151 m (7,136–7,057 ft)-long Tirebolu-1 Tunnel in the east on the same highway.

The tunnel was opened to traffic on April 7, 2007 by Turkish Prime Minister Recep Tayyip Erdoğan.
