= Erkenek Tunnel =

Road tunnel in Turkey

Erkenek Tunnel Erkenek Tüneli
- Interactive map of Erkenek Tunnel; Erkenek Tüneli

Overview
- Location: Erkenek, Doğanşehir, Malatya Province, Turkey
- Coordinates: 37.92589°N 37.87282°E Location of Erkenek Tunnel in Turkey.

- Route: D.850

Operation
- Work began: 2011
- Opened: 28 May 2017; 9 years ago
- Operator: General Directorate of Highways
- Traffic: automotive

Technical
- Length: 1,816 m (5,958 ft)

Erkenek Tunnel (Turkish: Erkenek Tüneli), is a road tunnel in Malatya province, eastern Turkey opened in 2017 connecting Eastern Anatolia region with the Mediterranean Region.

Erkenek Tunnel is situated on the highway D.850 between Doğanşehir in Malatya Province and Gölbaşı in Adıyaman Province, west of Erkenek village. It connects Eastern Anatolia with the Mediterranean Region bypassing the Erkenek Pass, which made the heavy truck traffic difficult during the winter season. It is a twin-tube tunnel with a length of 1,816 m (5,958 ft).

Construction of the tunnel began in 2011.As insufficient soil survey and boring works caused mass wasting and subsidence, it lasted six years due to additional ground reinforcement works. The cost of construction is ₺ 253 million (approx. US$72 million. The opening of the tunnel took place in presence of Minister of Transport, Maritime and Communication Ahmet Arslan, Minister of Customs and Trade Bülent Tüfenkci and some other high-ranked local officials on 28 May 2017.
