= Elceğiz Tunnel =

Tunnel in Kürtün, Gümüşhane, Turkey

Elceğiz Tunnel Elceğiz Tüneli
- Interactive map of Elceğiz Tunnel; Elceğiz Tüneli

Overview
- Location: Elceğiz, Kürtün, Gümüşhane Province, Turkey
- Coordinates: 40°43′10″N 39°01′59″E Location of Elceğiz Tunnel in Turkey
- Status: Operational
- Route: D.877

Operation
- Opened: 1998
- Operator: General Directorate of Highways
- Traffic: automotive
- Character: Single-tube road tunnel

Technical
- Length: 1,265 m (4,150 ft)
- No. of lanes: 2 x 1

The Elceğiz Tunnel (Turkish: Elceğiz Tüneli) is a road tunnel constructed on the Tirebolu–Gümüşhane state highway D.877 in Gümüşhane Province, northeastern Turkey. It was opened to traffic in 1998.

The 1,265 m (4,150 ft)-long single-tube tunnel carrying one lane of traffic in each direction is situated near Elceğiz village in Kürtün district. It is part of a series of 20 tunnels in various lengths in the Harşit River valley.
