= Honaz Tunnel =

Road tunnel in Denizli Province, Turkey

Honaz Tunnel Honaz Tüneli
- Interactive map of Honaz Tunnel; Honaz Tüneli

Overview
- Location: (Turkey) Denizli Province
- Coordinates: 37°45′04.7″N 29°12′30.2″E
- Status: Operational
- Route: D.585 D.320
- Start: Cankurtaran, Pamukkale
- End: Karateke, Honaz

Operation
- Work began: 2 November 2011
- Opened: 28 January 2023
- Owner: General Directorate of Highways
- Traffic: automotive
- Character: Twin-tube highway tunnel

Technical
- Length: 2,640 m (8,660 ft)
- No. of lanes: 2 x 2
- Operating speed: 80 km/h (50 mph)
- Tunnel clearance: 4.80 m (15.7 ft)

The Honaz Tunnel (Honaz Tüneli) is a road tunnel in Denizli Province, Turkey. It connects the state roads D.585 and D.320, passing through Mount Honaz. The tunnel was opened to traffic on 28 January 2023 by Turkish president Recep Tayyip Erdoğan.
