= Kızılcahamam–Çerkeş Tunnel =

Highway tunnel in Turkey

- Interactive map of Kızılcahamam–Çerkeş Tunnel

Overview
- Official name: Kızılcahamam–Çerkeş Tüneli
- Location: Kızılcahamam, Ankara – Çerkeş, Çankırı
- Coordinates: 40.68948°N 32.73438°E Location of the tunnel in Turkey
- Status: Operational

Operation
- Opened: 27 February 2021; 5 years ago
- Owner: General Directorate of Highways
- Traffic: automotive

Technical
- Length: 2,071 m (6,795 ft)

Kızılcahamam–Çerkeş Tunnel (Turkish: Kızılcahamam–Çerkeş Tüneli) is a highway tunnel between Kızılcahamam in Ankara Province and Çerkeş in Çankırı Province in Central Anatolia Region of Turkey.

The tunnel is 2,071 m (6,795 ft) long. It was opened to traffic on 27 February 2021. It will allow a much safer and comfortable journey, which is more difficult in harsh winter conditions in the high-elevated and sloping terrain. Through the tunnel, the distance shortens about 2.4 km (1.5 mi) and the travel time drops off from 15 minutes to 3 minutes.
