= Asarkayası Tunnel =

Road tunnel in Turkey

Asarkayası Tunnel Asarkayası Tüneli
- Interactive map of Asarkayası Tunnel; Asarkayası Tüneli

Overview
- Location: Perşembe, Ordu Province
- Coordinates: 40°59′09″N 37°46′48″E Location of Asarkayası Tunnel in Turkey
- Status: Operational
- Route: D.010 E70

Operation
- Work began: 1997
- Constructed: Nurol-Tekfen-Yüksel joint venture
- Opened: April 7, 2007; 19 years ago
- Operator: General Directorate of Highways
- Traffic: automotive

Technical
- Length: 310 and 314 m (1,017 and 1,030 ft)
- No. of lanes: 2 x 2
- Operating speed: 80 km/h (50 mph)

Asarkayası Tunnel (Turkish: Asarkayası Tüneli), is a highway tunnel constructed in Ordu Province, northern Turkey.

Asarkayası Tunnel is part of the Samsun-Ordu Highway D.010 E70 within the Black Sea Coastal Highway, of which construction was carried out by the Turkish Nurol-Tekfen-Yüksel joint venture. The 310 and 314 m (1,017 and 1,030 ft)-long twin-tube tunnel carrying two lanes of traffic in each direction is flanked by 3,805–3,825 m (12,484–12,549 ft)-long Ordu Nefise Akçelik Tunnel in the west and 3,313–3,308 m (10,869–10,853 ft)-long Boztepe Tunnel in the east on the same highway.

The tunnel was opened to traffic on April 7, 2007 by Turkish Prime Minister Recep Tayyip Erdoğan. Dangerous goods carriers are not permitted to use the tunnel.
