= Yenikent Tunnel =

Road tunnel in Turkey

Yenikent Tunnel Yenikent Tüneli
- Interactive map of Yenikent Tunnel; Yenikent Tüneli

Overview
- Location: Gerze, Sinop Province
- Coordinates: 41°44′14″N 35°15′28″E Location of Yenikent Tunnel in Turkey
- Status: Operational
- Route: D.010

Operation
- Constructed: Cengiz Construction Company
- Opened: 14 December 2012; 13 years ago
- Operator: General Directorate of Highways
- Traffic: automotive

Technical
- Length: 1,598 and 1,530 m (5,243 and 5,020 ft)
- No. of lanes: 2 x 2
- Operating speed: 80 km/h (50 mph)

Yenikent Tunnel (Turkish: Yenikent Tüneli), is a highway tunnel constructed in Sinop Province, northern Turkey.

Yenikent Tunnel is part of the Sinop-Samsun Highway D.010 within the Black Sea Coastal Highway, of which construction was carried out by the Turkish Cengiz Construction Company. The 1,598 and 1,530 m (5,243 and 5,020 ft)-long twin-tube tunnel carrying two lanes of traffic in each direction. The Gerze Tunnel follows the Yenikent Tunnel in direction Sinop.

The tunnel was opened to traffic on 14 December 2012 by Turkish Minister of Transport, Maritime and Communication Binali Yıldırım.
