= Boztepe Tunnel =

Road tunnel in Turkey

Boztepe Tunnel Boztepe Tüneli
- Location in Turkey

Overview
- Location: Altınordu, Ordu, Ordu Province
- Coordinates: 40.9743°N 37.8378°E
- Status: Operational
- Route: D.010 E70

Operation
- Work began: 15 July 2012; 14 years ago
- Constructed: Nurol-Yüksel-Özka–YDA joint venture
- Opened: 3 March 2019; 7 years ago
- Operator: General Directorate of Highways
- Traffic: automotive

Technical
- Length: 3,313 and 3,308 m (10,869 and 10,853 ft)
- No. of lanes: 2 x 2
- Operating speed: 80 km/h (50 mph)

Boztepe Tunnel (Turkish: Boztepe Tüneli), is a highway tunnel located in Ordu Province, in northern Turkey.

Boztepe Tunnel is a part of the Samsun-Ordu Highway D.010 E70 within the Black Sea Coastal Highway, whose construction was carried out by the Turkish Nurol-Yüksel-Özka-YDA joint venture. It is a twin-tube tunnel with two lanes of traffic in each direction, and its length is approximately 3,313 and 3,308 meters (10,869 and 10,853 ft). The tunnel is flanked by the Asarkayası Tunnel which is about 310–314 meters (1,017–1,030 ft) long, on the western side, and the Öceli Tunnel, which is approximately 2,004–2,034 meters (6,575–6,673 ft) long, on the eastern side. All of these tunnels are part of the same highway.

The Boztepe tunnel was officially opened to traffic on 3 March 2019 by Turkish President Recep Tayyip Erdoğan.
