= Dranaz Tunnel =

Turkish road tunnel

Dranaz Tunnel Dranaz Tüneli
- Interactive map of Dranaz Tunnel; Dranaz Tüneli

Overview
- Location: Sinop–Boyabat, Turkey
- Coordinates: 41°37′48″N 34°53′29″E Location of Dranaz Tunnel in Turkey
- Status: Operational
- Route: D.785

Operation
- Opened: 14 February 2009; 17 years ago
- Operator: General Directorate of Highways
- Traffic: automotive

Technical
- Length: 2,016 m (6,614 ft)
- No. of lanes: 2 x 1

The Dranaz Tunnel (Turkish: Dranaz Tüneli), officially Ahmet Muhip Dıranas Tunnel (Turkish: Ahmet Muhip Dıranas Tüneli) is a road tunnel constructed on the Sinop–Boyabat state highway D.785 in Sinop Province, northern Turkey.

It is constructed to enable an easy access from Black Sea Region to Central Anatolia Region bypassing Dranaz Pass on the high-elevated Küre Mountains, which run parallel to the Black Sea coast.

The excavation works at the tunnel were carried out from both sides. The breakthrough took place in July 2002 after 18 months of tunnelling. The 2,016 m (6,614 ft)-long tunnel carries one lane of traffic in each direction inside one tube. All the infrastructural installations for power supply, lighting, tunnel ventilation, signalling, fire fighting and automation, which are needed to meet high safety requirements due to heavy traffic in the undivided two-lane tunnel, were provided by Siemens. The Dranaz Tunnel was opened to traffic in presence of Prime minister Recep Tayyip Erdoğan on 14 February 2009.
