= Demirciköy Tunnel =

Highway tunnel in Sinop Province, Turkey

Demirciköy Tunnel Demirciköy Tüneli
- Interactive map of Demirciköy Tunnel; Demirciköy Tüneli

Overview
- Location: Sinop, Sinop Province
- Coordinates: 41°56′38″N 35°05′03″E Location of Demirciköy Tunnel in Turkey
- Status: Operational
- Route: D.010

Operation
- Constructed: Dağcan Construction and Trade Company Inc
- Opened: 26 March 2014; 12 years ago
- Operator: General Directorate of Highways
- Traffic: automotive

Technical
- Length: 1,680 and 1,680 m (5,510 and 5,510 ft)
- No. of lanes: 2 x 2
- Operating speed: 80 km/h (50 mph)

Demirciköy Tunnel (Turkish: Demirciköy Tüneli) is a highway tunnel constructed in Sinop Province, northern Turkey.

Demirciköy Tunnel is part of the Sinop-Samsun Highway D.010 within the Black Sea Coastal Highway, of which construction was carried out by the Turkish Dağcan Construction and Trade Company Inc. The 1,680 and 1,680 m (5,510 and 5,510 ft)-long twin-tube tunnel carrying two lanes of traffic in each direction is flanked by 1,285–1,285 m (4,216–4,216 ft)-long Çiftlik Tunnel in the north and 348–348 m (1,142–1,142 ft)-long Gerze Tunnel in the south on the same highway.

The tunnel was opened to traffic on 26 March 2014.
