= Çiftlik Tunnel =

Road tunnel in Turkey

Çiftlik Tunnel Çiftlik Tüneli
- Interactive map of Çiftlik Tunnel; Çiftlik Tüneli

Overview
- Location: Sinop, Sinop Province
- Coordinates: 41°57′33″N 35°05′18″E Location of Çiftlik Tunnel in Turkey
- Status: Operational
- Route: D.010

Operation
- Constructed: Dağcan Construction and Trade Company Inc
- Opened: 26 March 2014; 12 years ago
- Operator: General Directorate of Highways
- Traffic: automotive

Technical
- Length: 1,285 and 1,285 m (4,216 and 4,216 ft)
- No. of lanes: 2 x 2
- Operating speed: 80 km/h (50 mph)

Çiftlik Tunnel (Turkish: Çiftlik Tüneli), is a highway tunnel constructed in Sinop Province, northern Turkey.

Çiftlik Tunnel is part of the Sinop-Samsun Highway D.010 within the Black Sea Coastal Highway, of which construction was carried out by the Turkish Dağcan Construction and Trade Company Inc. The 1,285 and 1,285 m (4,216 and 4,216 ft)-long twin-tube tunnel carrying two lanes of traffic in each direction. The Demirciköy Tunnel follows the Çiftlik Tunnel in direction Samsun.

The tunnel was opened to traffic on 26 March 2014.
