= Salmankaş Tunnel =

Road tunnel in Turkey

Salmankaş Tunnel Salmankaş Tüneli
- Interactive map of Salmankaş Tunnel; Salmankaş Tüneli

Overview
- Location: Salmankaş Pass, Gümüşhane Province-Bayburt Province, Turkey
- Coordinates: 40°30′38″N 40°05′42″E
- Status: Operational
- Route: P.29-26 and P.69-75
- Start: 23 August 2012

Operation
- Constructed: as-yol Yapı A.Ş.
- Opened: December 20, 2019; 6 years ago
- Owner: General Directorate of Highways
- Traffic: automotive
- Character: Twin-tube tunnel

Technical
- Length: 4,150 m (13,620 ft)

Location of Salmankaş Tunnel in Turkey

The Salmankaş Tunnel (Turkish: Salmankaş Tüneli) is a road tunnel located on the province border of Gümüşhane and Bayburt connecting the provincial roads P.29-26 and P.69-75 on the route from Araklı, Trabzon via Dağbaşı, Trabzon to Uğrak, Bayburt in northeastern Turkey.

Situated on the Mount Salmankaş of Pontic Mountains, it is a 4,150 m (13,620 ft)-long twin-tube tunnel. The cost of the construction, which is carried out by as-yol Yapı A.Ş., is estimated to be ₺170 million.

It was built to bypass the Salmankaş Pass at 2,280 m (7,480 ft) elevation, which is on the ancient Silk Road, with extremely steep incline and to alleviate Black Sea Region's access to Eastern Anatolia Region. The tunnel will also eliminate the six-month-long traffic inaccessibility during the winter months due to harsh climatic conditions by heavy snow fall, icing and fog. It will shorten the route about 16 km (9.9 mi) resulting in a travel time reduction from 2–3.5 hours to 1.5 hours.

The groundbreaking ceremony was held in presence of Minister of Transport, Maritime and Communication Binali Yıldırım on 23 August 2012. For the construction of the tunnel the New Austrian Tunnelling method (NATM) is being applied. The breakthrough in the tunnel was achieved on 24 November 2013.

The tunnel was opened to traffic on December 20, 2019.
