= Gerze Tunnel =

Road tunnel in Turkey

Gerze Tunnel Gerze Tüneli
- Interactive map of Gerze Tunnel; Gerze Tüneli

Overview
- Location: Gerze, Sinop Province
- Coordinates: 41°47′22″N 35°11′27″E Location of Gerze Tunnel in Turkey
- Status: Operational
- Route: D.010

Operation
- Constructed: Cengiz Construction Company
- Opened: 26 March 2014; 12 years ago
- Operator: General Directorate of Highways
- Traffic: automotive

Technical
- Length: 348 and 348 m (1,142 and 1,142 ft)
- No. of lanes: 2 x 2
- Operating speed: 80 km/h (50 mph)

Gerze Tunnel (Turkish: Gerze Tüneli), is a highway tunnel constructed in Sinop Province, northern Turkey.

Gerze Tunnel is part of the Sinop-Samsun Highway D.010 within the Black Sea Coastal Highway, of which construction was carried out by the Turkish Cengiz Construction Company. The 348 and 348 m (1,142 and 1,142 ft)-long twin-tube tunnel carrying two lanes of traffic in each direction is flanked by 1,680–1,680 m (5,510–5,510 ft)-long Demirciköy Tunnel in the northwest and 1,598–1,530 m (5,243–5,020 ft)-long Yenikent Tunnel in the southeast on the same highway.

The tunnel was opened to traffic on 26 March 2014.
