= Great Istanbul Tunnel =

Under construction road/rail tunnel under the Bosphorus

Coordinates: 41°03′N 29°03′E

- Interactive map of Great Istanbul Tunnel

Overview
- Official name: Büyük İstanbul Tüneli
- Location: Istanbul, Turkey
- Status: Under construction
- Start: Gayrettepe, Şişli, Istanbul
- End: Küçüksu, Beykoz, Istanbul

Operation
- Work began: 2018
- Opens: 2028
- Owner: Ministry of Transportation, Maritime and Communication
- Traffic: Road-rail

Technical
- Length: 6.5 km (4.0 mi)

The Great Istanbul Tunnel (Turkish: Büyük İstanbul Tüneli) is a planned multi-use highway and railway undersea tunnel in Istanbul, Turkey to cross the Bosphorus strait connecting the Europe side and Asia side. It will be the third and the longest tunnel crossing the Bosphorus strait, at a length of 6.5 km, surpassing the Eurasia Tunnel at 5.4 km and the Marmaray Tunnel at 13.5 km.

== Project ==
The project was officially announced by Prime minister Ahmet Davutoğlu on 27 February 2015. The tunnel, 6.5 km (4.0 mi) in length and 18.80 m (61.7 ft) in diameter, will consist of three levels, two levels for road traffic and one level for metro lines. It will be 110 m (360 ft) under the sea level. Situated between Gayrettepe on the European side and Küçüksu on the Asian side, it will integrate the highways between the three airports of the city, Istanbul Atatürk Airport, Sabiha Gökçen Airport, Istanbul Airport, and the nine metro lines of the Istanbul Metro. The cost of the project will amount to US$3.5 billion. The financing of the construction will be on the build–operate–transfer basis.

== Construction ==
The RV Fugro Scout, a Singapore-flagged research/survey vessel of 83 m (272 ft) length and 20 m (66 ft) beam, started soil survey works in Bosphorus on 28 July 2017 in order to determine the exact tunnel route. Construction began in 2018, and was expected to be completed by 2023. Due to some issues in land acquisition, the project is now expected to be finished in 2028.

== See also ==
- Eurasia Tunnel, undersea road tunnel, crossing the Bosphorus and connecting the Asian and European sides of Istanbul.
- HızRay, proposed metro line by metropolitan municipality, which includes a Bosphorus crossing.
- Marmaray, undersea rail tunnel, crossing the Bosphorus and connecting the Asian and European sides of Istanbul.
