= Kağıthane–Piyalepaşa Tunnel =

Road tunnel in Istanbul, Turkey

Kağıthane–Piyalepaşa Tunnel Kağıthane–Piyalepaşa Tüneli
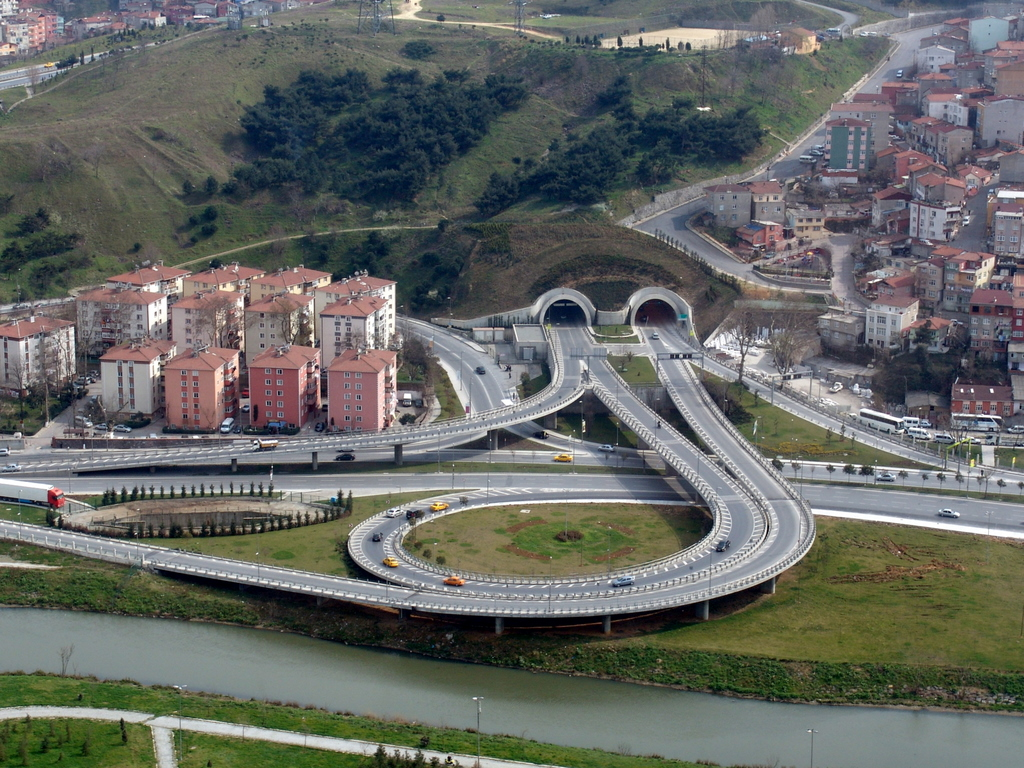
- Interactive map of Kağıthane–Piyalepaşa Tunnel; Kağıthane–Piyalepaşa Tüneli

Overview
- Location: Kağıthane – Piyalepaşa, Beyoğlu (Istanbul, Turkey)
- Coordinates: 41.06304°N 28.95501°E 41.05487°N 28.97060°E

Operation
- Work began: 2005
- Opened: 14 March 2009; 17 years ago
- Owner: Istanbul Metropolitan Municipality
- Traffic: automotive

Technical
- Length: 1,625 m (5,331 ft) (east bound); 1,625 m (5,331 ft) (west bound)
- No. of lanes: 2x2
- Operating speed: 70 km/h (43 mph)
- Tunnel clearance: 7.33 m (24.0 ft)
- Width: 11.80 m (38.7 ft)

Location of Kağıthane–Piyalepaşa Tunnel in Istanbul

The Kağıthane–Piyalepaşa Tunnel (Turkish: Kağıthane–Piyalepaşa Tüneli) is a twin-tube road tunnel under the inner city of Istanbul, Turkey connecting the Kağıthane district and Piyalepaşa Boulevard in Beyoğlu district. Opened in 2009, it is 1,625 m (5,331 ft) long.

The tunnel is part of a project of the Istanbul Metropolitan Municipality to build seven tunnels for the "City of Seven Hills", which is the nickname of Istanbul. It was opened on 14 March 2009 as the first tunnel of this project after a construction time of four years. Its southeast entry is situated on the Piyalepaşa Boulevard, which runs between the neighborhoods Okmeydanı and Kasımpaşa. The northwest entry is located in Kağıhane. The two independent tubes with two lanes each are 11.80 m (38.7 ft) wide, 7.33 m (24.0 ft) high and 1,625 m (1.010 mi) long.
