= Intercontinental and transoceanic fixed links =

Permanent road/rail connections between continents

A fixed link or fixed crossing is a permanent, unbroken road or rail connection across water that uses some combination of bridges, tunnels, and causeways and does not involve intermittent connections such as drawbridges or ferries. A bridge–tunnel combination is commonly used for major fixed links.

This is a list of proposed and actual transport links between continents and to offshore islands. See also list of bridge–tunnels for another list of fixed links including links across rivers, bays and lakes.

== History ==
=== Cosmopolitan Railway ===
In 1890 William Gilpin first proposed to connect all the continents by land via the Cosmopolitan Railway. Significant elements of that proposal, such as the English Channel Tunnel, have been constructed since that era. However, the improvement of the global shipping industry and advent of international air travel has reduced the demand for many intercontinental land connections.

== Existing or under construction ==
Name	Crossing	Termini		Opened	Notes
Channel Tunnel	Strait of Dover	Kent, England, United Kingdom	Pas-de-Calais, Hauts-de-France, France	1994	A cross channel tunnel was first proposed in 1802 and construction actually started in 1881 before being abandoned. Roll-on/roll-off ferry services provided links across the channel for vehicles. A road tunnel was proposed in 1979, but not considered viable. Construction of the Channel Tunnel started in 1988 and the tunnel opened in 1994. Automobiles and lorries/transport trucks are loaded onto the Eurotunnel Shuttle's enclosed railway cars (similar to auto rack/motorail railway cars) for the trip through the tunnel. A service road tunnel runs the entire length of the crossing, but is closed to general use and used only during emergencies and for maintenance. Cyclists – both amateur and professional – have crossed the channel via the tunnel on special occasions.
Crimean Bridge	Kerch Strait	Crimea	Krasnodar Krai, Russia	2018	The bridge complex provides for both vehicular traffic and for rail. During the Russian invasion of Ukraine, the bridge has been attacked or damaged on three occasions: 8 October 2022, 17 July 2023 and 12 August 2023. As of August 2023, the bridge reopened at a limited capacity.
Øresund Bridge	Øresund	Tårnby, Denmark	Malmö, Sweden	1999	
Great Belt Bridge	Great Belt	Slagelse, Denmark	Nyborg, Denmark	1998	
Fehmarn Belt fixed link	Fehmarn Belt	Lolland, Denmark	Fehmarn, Germany	2031	
Bosphorus Bridge	Bosporus	Istanbul, Turkey		1973	
Fatih Sultan Mehmet Bridge	Bosporus	Istanbul, Turkey		1988	
Marmaray Tunnel	Bosporus	Istanbul, Turkey		2013	
Yavuz Sultan Selim Bridge	Bosporus	Istanbul, Turkey		2016	
Eurasia Tunnel	Bosporus	Istanbul, Turkey		2016	
1915 Çanakkale Bridge	Dardanelles	Gelibolu District, Çanakkale Province, Turkey	Lapseki District, Çanakkale Province, Turkey	2022	
Suez Canal Bridge	Suez Canal	Ismailia Governorate, Egypt		2001	
Johor–Singapore Causeway	Straits of Johor	Johor, Malaysia	Singapore	1924	
Malaysia–Singapore Second Link	Straits of Johor	Johor, Malaysia	Singapore	1998	
Busan–Geoje Bridge		Busan, South Korea	Geoje, South Gyeongsang Province, South Korea	2010	
Hong Kong–Zhuhai–Macau Bridge	Pearl River Delta	Hong Kong	Zhuhai, Guangdong, China / Macau	2018	
King Fahd Causeway	Gulf of Bahrain	Eastern Province, Saudi Arabia	Northern Governorate, Bahrain	1986	
Seikan Tunnel	Tsugaru Strait	Aomori Prefecture, Japan	Hokkaido, Japan	1988	
Confederation Bridge	Northumberland Strait	Strait Shores, New Brunswick, Canada	Borden-Carleton, Prince Edward Island, Canada	1997	
Chesapeake Bay Bridge–Tunnel	Chesapeake Bay	Virginia Beach, Virginia, United States	Northampton County, Virginia, United States	1964	
Chacao Channel bridge	Chacao Channel	Ancud, Chile	Calbuco, Chile	2028	

== Proposed ==
Crossing	Termini		Notes
English Channel	England, United Kingdom	France	There have been proposals at various times for a second channel tunnel of some kind.
English Channel	Jersey	Manche, Normandy, France	In July 2009, the States of Jersey were considering the feasibility of building a 14-mile (23 km) tunnel between Jersey (a British Crown dependency) and France. There was a revival of the idea in 2018 and 2021. It was reported in the local media that a link between Jersey and the neighbouring island of Guernsey would cost £2.6 billion.
St George's Channel	Pembrokeshire, Wales, United Kingdom	County Wexford, Ireland	Main article: Proposed British Isles fixed sea link connections § Proposed fixed sea links between Great Britain and Ireland Various ferry services link Ireland to Britain and France. A number of options for an Irish Sea fixed crossing have been proposed over the years, but none are currently under serious consideration. Additionally, there was a short-lived proposal for an underground roundabout beneath the Isle of Man, connecting tunnels to Ireland, Scotland, and two to England. Another proposal was for an additional route from Scotland to the Isle of Man.
Irish Sea	Anglesey, Wales, United Kingdom	County Dublin, Ireland	
North Channel	Rhins of Galloway, Scotland, United Kingdom	County Down, Northern Ireland, United Kingdom	
North Channel	Kintyre, Scotland, United Kingdom	County Antrim, Northern Ireland, United Kingdom	
The Minch / Sea of the Hebrides	Highland, Scotland, United Kingdom	Outer Hebrides, Scotland, United Kingdom	
Baltic Sea	Falster, Denmark	Rostock, Mecklenburg-Vorpommern, Germany	Main article: Gedser–Rostock bridge
Baltic Sea	Bornholm, Denmark	Skåne County, Sweden	Main article: Bornholm Tunnel
Kvarken	Västerbotten County, Sweden	Ostrobothnia, Finland	Main article: Kvarken Bridge
Gulf of Finland	Uusimaa, Finland	Harju County, Estonia	Main article: Helsinki–Tallinn Tunnel
Suur Strait	Muhu, Saare County, Estonia	Lääneranna Parish, Pärnu County, Estonia	Considered by the Estonian government between 2020 and 2023.
Strait of Messina	Messina, Sicily, Italy	Reggio Calabria, Calabria, Italy	Main article: Strait of Messina Bridge
Piombino Channel	Elba, Tuscany, Italy	Piombino, Tuscany, Italy	There is a project to link Elba with the Italian mainland across the Piombino Channel with a 16-kilometre (9.9 mi) road tunnel. The feasibility project was launched by the Cacelli Partners Ltd of Riccardo Cacelli, in collaboration with the Adu London studio of the architect David Ulivagnoli.
	Palau, Sardinia, Italy	La Maddalena, Sardinia, Italy	
Strait of Bonifacio	Sardinia, Italy	Corsica, France	The has been interest from Hyperloop One in using Hyperloop to connect Sardinia and Corsica.
Adriatic Sea	Marche, Italy	Zadar County, Croatia	The idea was presented by the Roman architect Giorgio De Romanis, and also called for the creation of a special company "Il ponte sull'Adriatico Srl". The bridge would be suspended above the sea at a height of 30–70 metres (98–230 ft), and would also allow the laying of pipes for water, oil and gas, as well as the accommodation of telecommunication cables. The idea received the support of the ex-governor of the Marche, Gian Mario Spacca. Some sources considered the project as being more realistic than a bridge between Calabria and Sicily.
Strait of Otranto	Vlorë County, Albania	Lecce, Apulia, Italy	Main article: Vlora-Otranto Tunnel
Boknafjord	Bokn Municipality, Norway	Stavanger, Norway	Main article: Rogfast
Suðuroyarfjørður	Sandoy, Faroe Islands	Suðuroy, Faroe Islands	Main article: Suðuroyartunnilin
	Vestmannaeyjar, Iceland	Rangárþing eystra, Iceland	Main article: Vestmannaeyjagöng
	Mellieħa, Malta	Gozo, Malta	Main article: Malta–Gozo Tunnel
Strait of Gibraltar	Cádiz, Andalusia, Spain	Tangier-Tétouan-Al Hoceima, Morocco	Main article: Strait of Gibraltar Tunnel
Strait of Sicily	Sicily, Italy	Tunisia	Main article: Strait of Sicily Tunnel
Gulf of Aqaba	South Sinai Governorate, Egypt	Tabuk Province, Saudi Arabia	Main article: Saudi–Egypt Causeway A causeway faces considerable political hurdles as the disruption of Israeli shipping access to the Red Sea was seen as a casus belli by Israel ahead of the Six-Day War. There is a car ferry between Safaga, Egypt and Duba, Saudi Arabia. The two uninhabited islands in the strait (Tiran island and Sanafir island), which might be used for a bridge, tunnel or causeway, were disputed between Egypt and Saudi Arabia until President Abdel Fatah al-Sisi of Egypt officially ceded them to Saudi Arabia in 2016/2017. The potential construction of a fixed link was cited in some media reports as contributing to the cession.
Bab-el-Mandeb	Djibouti	Yemen	The Bridge of the Horns is a proposed construction project to build a bridge between the coasts of Djibouti and Yemen across the Bab-el-Mandeb, the strait between the Red Sea and Gulf of Aden. There are no ferry services on this route as of 2018.
Red Sea	Saudi Arabia	Eritrea	Saudi Arabia considers to develop a 440-kilometre (270 mi) tunnel across the Red Sea to link its industrial city of Jazan with Massawa's port in Eritrea. It had the support of Pakistan and the Chinese Belt and Road Initiative.
Zanzibar Channel	Unguja, Zanzibar, Tanzania	Dar es Salaam / Pwani Region, Tanzania	Main article: Zanzibar Bridge
Palk Strait	Ramanathapuram district, Tamil Nadu, India	Mannar District, Northern Province, Sri Lanka	Main article: Palk Strait Bridge
Malacca Strait	Johor, Malaysia	Riau, Indonesia	Main article: Malacca Strait Bridge The total length would be 39–40 kilometres (24–25 mi).
Singapore Strait	Singapore	Riau Islands, Indonesia	Main article: Singapore Strait crossing
Sunda Strait	Lampung, Sumatra, Indonesia	Banten, Java, Indonesia	Main article: Sunda Strait Bridge
Bali Strait	Bali, Indonesia	East Java, Java, Indonesia	Main article: Bali Strait Bridge
Qiongzhou Strait	Zhanjiang, Guangdong, China	Hainan, China	A road-rail bridge has been proposed.
Bohai Strait	Yantai, Shandong, China	Dalian, Liaoning, China	Main article: Bohai Strait tunnel project
Taiwan Strait	Fujian, China	Taiwan	Main article: Taiwan Strait Tunnel Project The Taiwan Strait Tunnel Project is a proposed undersea tunnel to connect Pingtan in the People's Republic of China to Hsinchu in northern Taiwan as part of the G3 Beijing–Taipei Expressway. First proposed in 1996, the project has since been subject to a number of academic discussions and feasibility studies, including by the China Railway Engineering Corporation. There exist cross strait ferries, both within outlying islands of Taiwan and between the PRC and Taiwan. The political status of Taiwan complicates any such proposal.
Yellow Sea	South Korea	Weihai, Shandong, China	The Korean government considered building underwater tunnels with China, the proposed route would be between Incheon and Weihai, being considerate to build an intermediary artificial island in the route of 341 kilometers. Other Korean cities, like Ongjin, Hwaseong and Pyeongtaek, are considered to be part of the routes to China. Also, is part of the Chinese comprehensive development plan for the Bohai area.
Jeju Strait	South Jeolla Province, South Korea	Jeju Province, South Korea	Main article: Jeju Undersea Tunnel
Korea Strait	Japan	South Korea	Main article: Japan–Korea Undersea Tunnel
La Pérouse Strait	Hokkaido, Japan	Sakhalin, Russia	Main article: Sakhalin–Hokkaido Tunnel
Strait of Tartary / Nevelskoy Strait	Sakhalin, Russia	Khabarovsk Krai, Russia	Main article: Sakhalin Tunnel
Hōyo Strait	Ōita, Ōita Prefecture, Japan	Ikata, Ehime Prefecture, Japan	Shikoku and Kyushu are the only adjacent major Japanese islands not directly connected by a fixed link. Road travel between the two is possible only via Honshu, a detour of up to 600 kilometres (370 mi). Since 1995, the prefectures have been jointly conducting research into the technical feasibility of bridges over the strait and conducting basic research into natural and social conditions, and in 1998, in the "Hoyo Kaikyo Bridge Survey Report" it was concluded that the bridge would be technically feasible. The bridge proposed in the report uses a four-span suspension bridge with a central tower height of 376 metres (1,234 ft), central span length of 3,000 metres (9,800 ft), and bridge length of about 8,400 metres (27,600 ft) as the main bridge, connecting the Toyo Strait with two bridges, the extension would be about 12.7 kilometres (7.9 mi). The total project cost is currently estimated to be about 1.3 trillion yen (US$12.1 billion). The Hoyo Kaikyo Route Promotion Council conducted a survey comparing various crossing technologies (bridges, tunnels) and modes of transportation (automobiles, railways) in 1997, and "Transportation method comparison study report" was published. According to the report, in the case of bridges, road bridges are technically possible, but due to the long span, it is difficult to use them as railway bridges and combined bridges.
Gulf of Bahrain	Qatar	Bahrain	Main article: Qatar–Bahrain Causeway
Masirah Channel	Mahout, Al Wusta Governorate, Oman	Masirah Island, Ash Sharqiyah South Governorate, Oman	
Bering Strait	Chukotka Autonomous Okrug, Russia	Alaska, United States	Main article: Bering Strait crossing
Torres Strait	Queensland, Australia	Western Province, Papua New Guinea	
Cook Strait	Wellington Region, New Zealand	Marlborough District, New Zealand	
Bass Strait	Victoria, Australia	Tasmania, Australia	In 2013, the Tasmanian government said that a tunnel "should not be discounted".
Backstairs Passage	Kangaroo Island, South Australia, Australia	Cape Jervis, South Australia, Australia	
Strait of Georgia	Vancouver Island, British Columbia, Canada	Greater Vancouver, British Columbia, Canada	
Strait of Georgia	Vancouver Island, British Columbia, Canada	Washington, United States	
Strait of Belle Isle	Newfoundland, Newfoundland and Labrador, Canada	Labrador, Newfoundland and Labrador, Canada	Main article: Newfoundland–Labrador fixed link
Straits of Florida	Key West, Florida, United States	Cuba	
	Florida, United States	Bahamas	
	Ceiba, Puerto Rico	Vieques, Puerto Rico	
	Sangre Grande, Trinidad and Tobago	Tobago, Trinidad and Tobago	
Gulf of Paria	Trinidad, Trinidad and Tobago	Venezuela	
Río de la Plata	Argentina	Uruguay	
Strait of Magellan	San Gregorio, Magallanes Province, Magallanes Region, Chile	Primavera, Tierra del Fuego Province, Magallanes Region, Chile	
Atlantic Ocean	North America	Europe	Main article: Transatlantic tunnel

=== Persian Gulf and Arabian Sea ===
Iran and Qatar (who will take most part of the project's financing) have plans for an underwater tunnel connecting the two countries, being planned to be the longest tunnel in the world (having 190 km). It would link the Iranian port of Bandar-e Deyr to an unspecified location in Qatar across the Persian Gulf in both road and railway sections; however, a road tunnel is not considered very feasible due to the long distance. It had the support of Iran's Ports and Maritime Organisation managing director, Ali Akbar Safaei, and Iranian President Ebrahim Raisi, who expect the creation of a joint Qatar-Iran committee with the Emir of Qatar, Tamim bin Hamad Al Thani. Also, it will create a straight and direct route between Saudi Arabia and Iran.

Iran proposed to build an overpass bridge over the strait of Hormuz that will link Iran economically to GCC countries and Yemen through 39 km road link between Oman's Musandam exclave and southern Iran. The idea was having the support of Iranian Ambassador to Oman Ali Akbar Sibeveih.

The Persian Gulf Bridge in Qeshm–Bandar Abbas (Iran) will be a 2.4 km (1.5 mi) long road-rail bridge, connecting Qeshm Island to mainland Iran, from the historic port of Laft to Pahal port in Bandar Abbas (Hormozgan Province). It was proposed to build an undersea tunnel instead of a bridge, but was rejected due to high costs.

The Saudis were exploring two options to build a 400 km tunnel or bridge to link Gwadar (in Pakistan) with Muscat (in Oman) at the mouth of Strait of Hormuz at one end. The objective was to bypass its trade routes (including for oil supplies) with Iran and Qatar, because of the Iran–Saudi Arabia proxy conflict, also to extend the Chinese Belt and Road Initiative.

A 1,200 miles (1,900 km) tunnel, carrying Maglev trains, is planned to connect India’s biggest city Mumbai and emirate Fujairah (United Arab Emirates) through the Arabian Sea in a high-speed railway line to transport passengers, tourists and workers in just 2 hours. It had the support of Abdullah Alshehhi, chief consultant of Abu Dhabi National Advisory Office (a Masdar City-based consultancy), and the Gulf Cooperation Council. It is considered the longest submarine tunnel project in the world and will have a depth of 15,000 feet below the surface of the Indian Ocean.

Also, Karachi (Pakistan) and Muscat (Oman) are also included future plans of train stations, making provision for a road to be constructed within the tunnel for cars and trucks as well as a floating hotel, shopping centres and fuel stations, featuring pipelines for oil and water. Expansion of the project might include the One Belt One Road Initiative, linking China to Pakistan economic corridor at Gwadar Port with UAE, through the Fujairah port to complement the Chinese silk road.

== See also ==
- Atlantropa
- Orkney tunnel
- Trans-Asian Railway
- List of transport megaprojects
- List of straits
