= KGS (electronic toll collection) =

Turkish toll collection system

KGS, acronym for Kartlı Geçiş Sistemi (literally: Pass System with Card), was an electronic toll collection system of contactless smart card type available on toll roads and toll bridges in Turkey. It was abolished on 1 February 2013. The system was adopted to avoid traffic congestion at toll plazas. An alternative to KGS is the OGS system of radio-frequency identification (RFID) transponder type implemented on at the same toll plazas initially.

The KGS was launched in January 2005, and was first installed on the toll bridges Bosphorus Bridge on O-1 and Fatih Sultan Mehmet Bridge on O-2 over the Istanbul Strait. The smart card system was later extended to the intercity motorways O-3, O-4, O-32, O-51 and O-52. The KGS was in use on all toll roads in the country alongside the OGS until it was replaced by HGS.

Developed by ASELSAN, the system is administrated by the General Directorate of Highways (Turkish: TC Karayolları Genel Müdürlüğü, KGM).

== Tolling ==
The contactless smart card, which has the dimensions of a credit card, can be obtained from the office of toll plazas, authorized major banks and mobile points of sales. There are two types of KGS card depending on how the charge on thecard is paid. NKGS (Nakit KGS) for cash payment and KKGS (Kredili KGS) for credit payment. Motorists, who have a bank account, can obtain the KGS card from the bank, which recharges it automatically when the amount on the KKGS card falls under a predefined minimum limıt. By NKGS, the card is recharged by cash payment only.

Both KGS cards are issued for a specific vehicle category. While KKGS is associated with a specific licence plate and can not be transferred without notice to the provider, the NKGS card may be used for any vehicle of its toll category issued. The card number and the vehicle category are printed visible on both KGS cards.

Unlike by OGS, which allows the motorist a 20% discount, KGS card requires full toll payment except for motorcyclists.

At the toll plaza, the vehicle has to drive to a toll booth on the KGS-only assigned lane. KGS-lanes are situated always rightside to the OGS-lanes, and they are designated at some distance before the toll plaza. The booth is marked with KGS-sign at the top. A flashing green light at the top signals its usability. Unlike at OGS-lanes, there are gate arms on the exit of KGS-lanes. There are two card readers at each booth in order to give comfort to the driver depending on the height of the driver cabin.

The vehicle has to stop at the toll booth shortly. The contactless smart card, brought close to the reader's antenna at a distance of about 5–10 cm (2.0–3.9 in), communicates with the reader through an induction technology at 13.56 MHz. Information such as the card number, the vehicle category and the charge amount, which are stored on the embedded chip of the KGS card, are transmitted to the toll collection system.

Vehicles are classified for toll purposes in six categories based on the wheelbase and the number of axles. If the number of axles of a vehicle is less than the maximum number of axles -because some axles of a truck are lifted up or a tractor is running without its trailer-, the integrated automated vehicle classification system changes the vehicle category read in to the actual one during the passage allowing a lower toll tariff. The bridge toll is fixed for each vehicle category, and is charged only once in eastward direction on the two bridges in Istanbul. The road toll is rated further depending on the distance driven between the entry and the exit of motorway for each vehicle category. For this reason, a signal has to be initiated on the KGS-lane by entering the motorway.

At the toll booth's reader, an electronic display summarizes the tolling process showing one of the following messages:

- KARTINIZI OKUTUNUZ (Get your card read): Before entering the KGS-lane.
- BAKİYE (Balance): For NKGS cards only the balance on the card.
- İŞLEM TAMAM, GÜLE GÜLE (Operation complete, Good bye): For both KGS cards. Three beeps sound and there is a green light.
- KART İPTAL EDİLDİ (Card revoked): Operation unsuccessful, a red light is lit and twice two beeps sound.
- GEÇERSİZ KART (Invalid card): Operation unsuccessful, a red light is lit and twice two beeps sound.
- YETERSİZ BAKİYE (Insufficient balance): Operation unsuccessful, a red light is lit and twice two beeps sound.
- ONAY SESİNİ DUYMADAN KARTI ÇEKMEYİN (Do not remove card before having heard the approval sound): When the operation can not be completed due to the removal of the card out of the proximity area.
- İŞLEM TAMAM, KARTA PARA YÜKLEYİN (Operation complete. Recharge card): If the balance on the NKGS card is insufficient for a next toll payment. Four beeps sounds.
- ÜCRET ve BORÇ (Toll and Credit): For NKGS card, when the vehicle category was improper and the card charge insufficient.

== Violation ==
If the tolling process is not successful, a lamp under the electronic message display at the KGS booth turns red for a short time, and the display shows the appropriate violation message. Further, the driver is warned by a loud electronic horn at the booth, and the vehicle is photographed as well for evidence.

In case of unmatched vehicle category, the card's account is charged with the actual category. However, the driver is warned by the booth horn, and the vehicle is photographed. Card's account is charged with additional fine in amount of ten maximum toll for each violation. Vehicle is blacklisted when this type of violation occurs more than twice.

Vehicle owners or drivers can query information about their violation online or at a call center. Payment of the fine within 15 days following the violation notice's receipt enables 25% discount according to Turkish law.

== Replacement of KGS by HGS ==
Compared to the OGS toll payment system, the KGS caused traffic congestion during rush hours on the dedicated lanes at the toll plazas, particularly on the toll bridges over Bosporus in Istanbul, because the vehicles have to stop short to pay at the KGS toll booth. For this reason, the KGS system was replaced with the new HGS system, which uses radio-frequency identification (RFID) technology. The HGS was launched on September 17, 2012, while the KGS was in use until December 31, 2012, at all toll plazas. However, one KGS lane at each toll bridge on Bosporus stood open until January 31, 2013.

== See also ==
- OGS, radio-frequency identification (RFID) transponder type electronic toll collecting system
- HGS RFID system that replaced it
