= KGS =

KGS or kgs can refer to:

- KGS (electronic toll collection), Turkey
- Kos Island International Airport, IATA airport code
- The Kansas Geological Survey
- The Kentucky Geological Survey
- The KGS Go Server
- Kingston Grammar School, London, UK
- King George School (Calgary, Alberta), Canada
- Kings Sutton railway station, England; National Rail station code
- Karachi Grammar School, Pakistan
- Kyrgyzstani som currency, ISO 4217 code
- Knots ground speed, in aviation
- Kilograms, the SI unit of mass
