= OGS (electronic toll collection) =

The OGS placard that indicates the supported toll booths

OGS (Turkish: Otomatik Geçiş Sistemi English: Automated Transit System) was an electronic toll collection system of RFID transponder type available on toll roads and toll bridges in Turkey. The system was adopted to avoid traffic congestion at toll plazas. The successor to OGS is the HGS system of RFID tag type implemented later on at the same toll plazas.

It was launched in 1998, and was first installed on the Fatih Sultan Mehmet Bridge at O-2 over Bosporus in Istanbul. The OGS was later extended to the intercity motorways O-3, O-4, O-32, O-51 and O-52 and the other toll bridge Bosphorus Bridge on O-1 over the Istanbul Strait. The system was administrated by the General Directorate of Highways (Turkish: TC Karayolları Genel Müdürlüğü, KGM).

OGS was retired on March 31, 2022 and HGS is now the sole way of electronic toll collection.

== Tolling ==
The radio transponder, also known as a tag, was obtained from the office of the toll plazas, authorized major banks, mobile points of sales and on the internet as well, after signing an agreement. The tag was issued for a specific licence plate and so for a specific vehicle category. It could not be transferred without notice to the provider. The tags slightly differed in size and form depending on the provider, and could be replaced within the guarantee period, which varied from three to five years. Before using OGS, the tag's account had to be credited.

The OGS system involved the fixing of the tag on the inside of the vehicle's windshield, mostly behind the rear-view mirror. However, on some car brands, the tag had to be attached on the inside base of the windshield. At the toll plaza, the vehicle had to drive to a toll booth on the OGS-only assigned lane. OGS lanes were always leftmost passing lanes, and they are designated at some distance before the toll plaza. However, there were also additional OGS booths on the right side of toll plazas dedicated to heavy vehicles. The booth was marked with an OGS-sign at the top. A flashing green light at the top signaled its usability. The battery-driven tag communicated with the reader device built into the toll collection equipment at the toll booth as the vehicle passes through. It was not required that the vehicle stop. However, a speed limit of 30 km/h (19 mph) was recommended to avoid accidents before the booth.

Vehicles are classified for toll purposes in five categories based on the wheelbase and the number of axles. If the number of axles of a vehicle is less than the maximum number of axles -because some axles of a truck are lifted up or a tractor is running without its trailer-, the integrated automated vehicle classification system changes the vehicle category read in to the actual one during the passage allowing a lower toll tariff. The bridge toll is fixed for each vehicle category, and is charged only once in eastward direction on the two bridges in Istanbul. The road toll is rated further depending on the distance driven between the entry and the exit of motorway for each vehicle category. For this reason, a signal has to be initiated on the OGS-lane by entering the motorway. OGS users benefit from 20% discount at all toll roads and bridges in Turkey.

The tag could sound in two different modes: One beep indicates that tolling was successful. Four consecutive beeps meant that there was insufficient credit on the tag's account. If the tag did not sound at the next three or four passes, it was most likely that either the tag is out of order or it was being used in an incorrect way. In this case, the tag had to be tested by the highway authority, since untolled passes more than ten times was absolutely not allowed.

At the toll booth's exit, an electronic display summarizes the tolling process showing one of the following 9 messages:
Actual message in Turkish	English translation	Explanation
GÜLE GÜLE	Good bye	Tolling was successful. Vehicle category and toll amount are shown also.
KREDİ AZ	Low credit	Amount of credit on the bank account that the tag is bound is low. Payment onto account is needed.
KAÇIŞ	Fleeing	Vehicle without tag or with unreadable tag. Refrain from further passes.
KARA LST	Blacklist	Tag on blacklist. Do not pass.
S. FARKLI	Different vehicle class	The class of the vehicle on the tag does not match the actual class. Do not pass.
U DÖNÜŞÜ	U-turn	Vehicle performed a U-turn by exiting the same toll station it entered. The vehicle is tolled at the maximum distance tariff.
GİRİŞ YOK	No entry found	The tag has no information about the entry toll station. Vehicle is tolled at the maximum distance tariff.
SÜRE DOLU	Driving time exceeded	Vehicle overstayed on the motorway. Vehicle is tolled at the maximum distance tariff.
TANIMSIZ	Undefined	Improper/undefined tag. Do not pass.

== Violation ==
In order to allow an uninterrupted passage, there are no gate arms at toll booths on OGS-lanes (except toll booths on Autobahn O-5). If the tolling process is not successful, a lamp under the electronic message display at the exit of the OGS booth turns yellow for a short time, and the display shows the message "CEZALI GEÇİŞ, KAÇIŞ" (Violation, escape) adding vehicle's category and the amount of fine. Further, the driver is warned by a loud electronic horn at the booth, and the vehicle is photographed as well for evidence.

In the case of an unmatched vehicle category, the tag's account is charged with the actual category. However, the driver is warned by the booth horn, and the vehicle is photographed. The tag's account is charged with an additional fine of the amount of double the maximum toll for each violation. The vehicle is blacklisted when this type of violation occurs more than ten times. Vehicles on the blacklist or vehicles without a tag or with another vehicle's tag are charged with a fine as high as eleven times the toll amount.

Vehicle owners or drivers can query information about their violation online or at a call center. Payment of the fine within 15 days following the violation notice's receipt enables 25% discount according to Turkish law.

== See also ==
- HGS, passive tag RFID toll collecting system (in use)
- KGS, smart card type electronic toll collecting system (defunct)
