= Bering Strait crossing =

Proposed bridge or tunnel connection between Russia and Alaska

Coordinates: 65°47′N 169°01′W

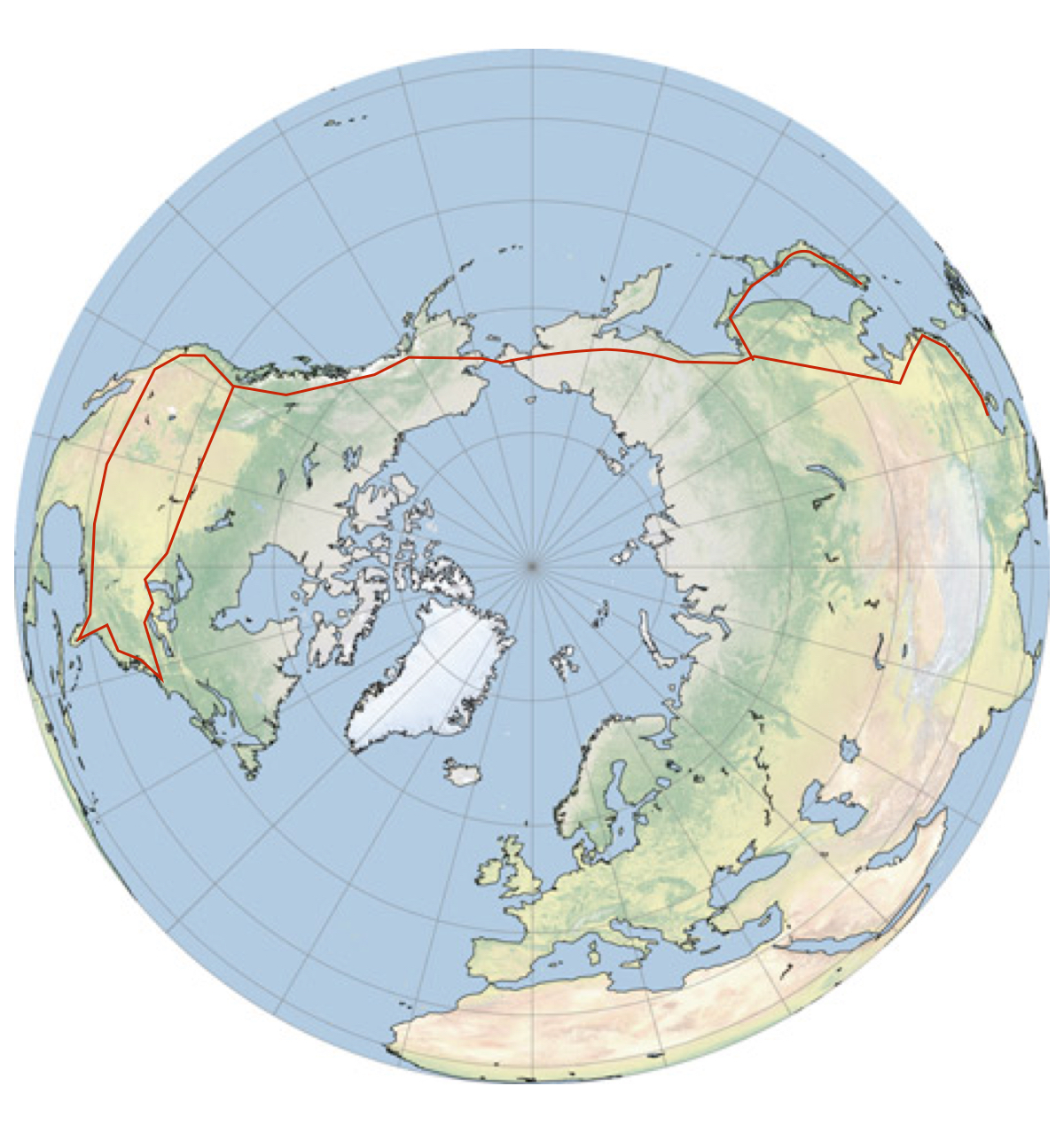
North Pole view of the Bering Strait

A Bering Strait crossing is a hypothetical bridge or tunnel that would span the relatively narrow and shallow Bering Strait between the Chukotka Peninsula in Russia and the Seward Peninsula in the U.S. state of Alaska. The crossing would provide a connection linking the Americas and Afro-Eurasia.

With the two Diomede Islands between the peninsulas, the Bering Strait could be spanned by a bridge or tunnel.

There have been several proposals for a Bering Strait crossing made by various individuals and media outlets. The names used for them include "The Intercontinental Peace Bridge" and "Eurasia–America Transport Link". Tunnel names have included "TKM–World Link", "AmerAsian Peace Tunnel", and InterBering. In April 2007, Russian government officials told the press that the Russian government would back a US$65 billion plan by a consortium of companies to construct a Bering Strait tunnel.

== History ==
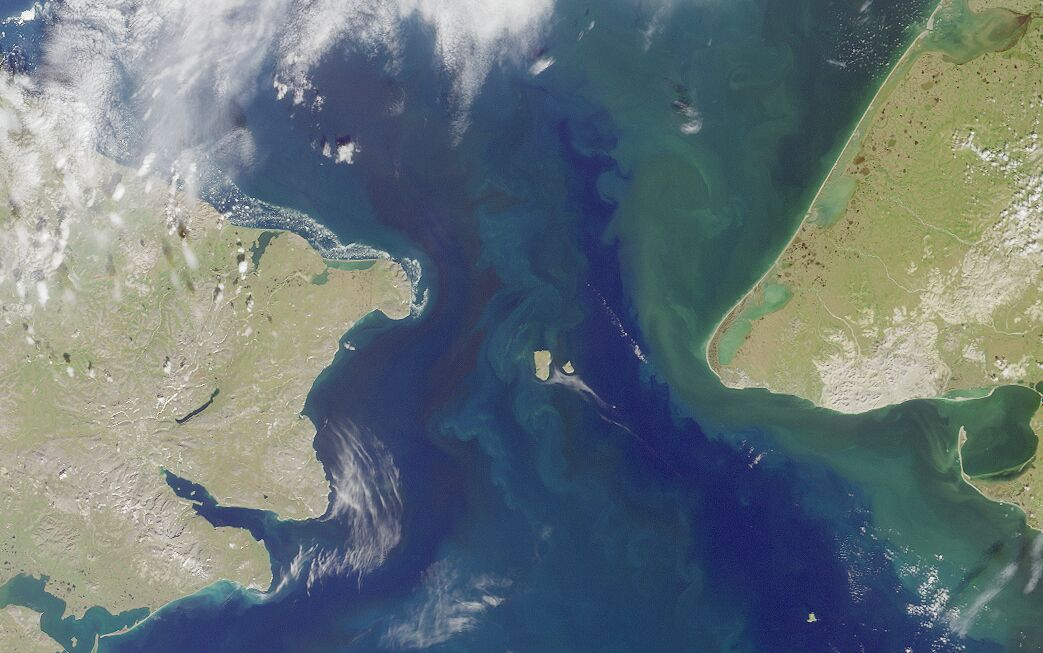
Satellite image of the Bering Strait. Cape Dezhnev, Russia, is on the left, the two Diomede Islands are in the middle, and Cape Prince of Wales, Alaska, is on the right.

=== 19th century ===
The concept of an overland connection crossing the Bering Strait goes back to the 19th century. William Gilpin, first governor of the Colorado Territory, envisaged a vast "Cosmopolitan Railway" in 1890 that would connect the entire world through a series of railways.

Two years later, Joseph Strauss, who went on to design over 400 bridges and then serve as the project engineer for the Golden Gate Bridge, put forward the first proposal for a Bering Strait rail bridge in his senior thesis. The project was presented to the government of the Russian Empire, but it was rejected.

=== 20th century ===
In 1904, a syndicate of American railroad magnates proposed (through a French spokesman) a Siberian–Alaskan railroad from Cape Prince of Wales in Alaska through a tunnel under the Bering Strait and across northeastern Siberia to Irkutsk via Cape Dezhnyov, Verkhnekolymsk, and Yakutsk (around 5,000 km [3,100 mi] of railroad to build, plus over 3,000 km [1,900 mi] in North America). The proposal was for a 90-year lease and exclusive mineral rights for 13 km (8 mi) on each side of the right-of-way. It was debated by officials and finally turned down on March 20, 1907.

Czar Nicholas II approved the American proposal in 1905 (only as a permission, not much financing from the Czar). Its cost was estimated at $65 million and $300 million, including all the railroads. These hopes were dashed with the outbreak of the Russian Revolution of 1905, followed by World War I.

There was a Nazi plan to create a wide-gauge railroad called the Breitspurbahn to connect the cities of Europe, India, China, and ultimately North America via the Bering Strait.

Interest was renewed during World War II with the completion in 1942–1943 of the Alaska Highway, linking the remote territory of Alaska with Canada and the continental United States. In 1942, the Foreign Policy Association envisioned the highway continuing to link with Nome near the Bering Strait, linked by highway to the railhead at Yakutsk, using an alternative sea-and-air ferry service across the Bering Strait. At the same time, the road on the Russian side was extended by building the 2,000-kilometer (1,200 mi) Kolyma Highway.

In 1958, engineer Tung-Yen Lin suggested the construction of a bridge across the Bering Strait "to foster commerce and understanding between the people of the United States and the Soviet Union." Ten years later, he organized the Inter-Continental Peace Bridge, Inc., a nonprofit institution organized to further this proposal. At that time, he made a feasibility study of a Bering Strait bridge and estimated the cost to be $1 billion for the 80 km (50 mi) span. In 1994, he updated the cost to more than $4 billion. Like Gilpin, Lin envisioned the project as a symbol of international cooperation and unity, and dubbed the project the Intercontinental Peace Bridge.

=== 21st century ===
According to a report in the Beijing Times in May 2014, Chinese transport experts had proposed building a roughly 10,000-kilometer (6,200 mi) high-speed rail line from northeast China to the United States. The project would include a tunnel under the Bering Strait and connect to the contiguous United States via Wales, Alaska, along the river to Fairbanks, Alaska, and along the Alaska Highway to Edmonton, Alberta, Canada.

Several American entrepreneurs have also advanced private-sector proposals, such as an Alaska-based limited-liability company, InterBering, founded in 2010 to lobby for a cross-straits connection, and a 2018 cryptocurrency offering to fund the construction of a tunnel.

In 2005, Sun Myung Moon of the Unification Church promoted a proposal to dig a transportation corridor beneath the Bering Strait as part of his envisioned International Peace Highway project. Neil Bush accompanied Moon but ultimately declined to supported the tunnel project.

== Strategic military concerns ==
Proposals to construct a strait crossing predate the 2022 Russian invasion of Ukraine and the Russo-Ukrainian war, which began in February 2014. Russia's actions have raised serious scepticism about its possible realization in the near future, especially regarding the proposed crossing's impact on the national security of the United States and Canada, considering that such a bridge or a tunnel would effectively enable Russian armed forces, paramilitary troops, spies, and saboteurs to gain a land bridge directly to North America. Even before the beginning of the Russian invasion of Ukraine, commentators on the proposed link have flagged strategic military concerns as a factor in any decision to build the crossing.

== Technical concerns ==
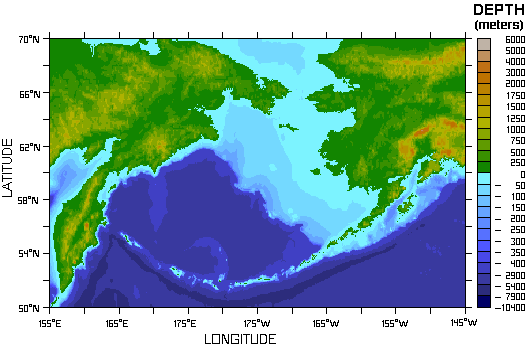
Bering Strait depth

=== Geologic faults ===
Several major geologic faults run through the Bering Strait region, although some are offshore, and their exact offshore extent is still debated. Key faults include the Kaltag and Bendeleben faults on land, and the Bering Fracture Zone offshore, which is the site of significant seismic activity and tectonic plate boundaries.

=== Distance ===
The straight distance between Russia and Alaska is 82.5 kilometers (51.3 mi). If the two parts are connected by building a bridge, or, even more likely, a series of bridges, while using the Diomede Islands as intermediate points, the length of the three separate bridges, spanning across water from one island to another, would be at least 36.0, 3.8, and 36.8 km (22.4, 2.4, and 22.9 mi), or 76.6 km (47.6 mi) in total.

=== Depth of water ===
The depth of the water is a minor problem, as the strait is no deeper than 55 meters (180 ft), comparable to the English Channel. The tides and currents in the area are not severe.

=== Weather-related challenges ===
==== Restrictions on construction work ====
The route is just south of the Arctic Circle, and the location has long, dark winters and extreme weather, including average winter lows of −20 °C (−4 °F) and temperatures approaching −50 °C (−58 °F) in cold snaps. This would mean that construction work would likely be restricted to five months of the year, around May to September, and centered during the summer.

==== Exposed steel ====
The extreme arctic weather also poses a significant challenge to exposed steel and other construction materials. In Lin's design, concrete covers all structures to simplify maintenance and to offer additional stiffening.

==== Ice floes ====
Although there are no icebergs in the Bering Strait, ice floes up to 1.8 meters (6 ft) thick are in constant motion during certain seasons, which could produce forces on the order of 44 meganewtons (9,900,000 pounds-force; 4,500 tonnes-force) on a pier.

=== Tundra in the surrounding regions ===
Roads on either side of the strait would need to be constructed in a way that enables them to cross extensive areas of tundra unhindered, requiring either an unpaved road or another solution to avoid the obstructing effects of permafrost.

== Likely route and expenses ==
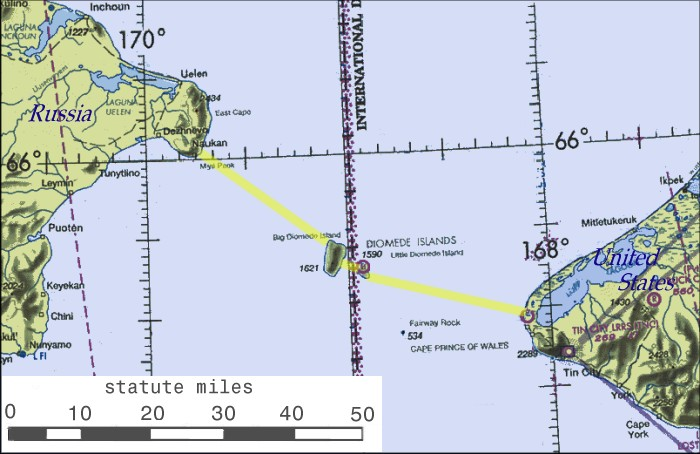
Place for the bridge, showing the Siberian ghost town of Naukan as its western terminus.

=== Bridge option ===
If the bridge is chosen over the tunnel as a type of fixed-link crossing, the most technically and economically feasible option would be to connect Wales, Alaska, to a location south of Uelen. In this case, predictions suggest that the link would likely not consist of a single, uninterrupted bridge but would rather be divided into several bridges that would be interconnected with each other by the Diomede Islands, located in the middle of the Bering Strait.

In 1994, Lin estimated the cost of a bridge to be "a few billion" dollars. The roads and railways on each side were estimated to cost $50 billion. Lin contrasted this cost to petroleum resources "worth trillions". Discovery Channel's Extreme Engineering estimates the cost of a highway, electrified double-track high-speed rail, and pipelines at $105 billion (in 2007 US dollars), five times the original cost of the 1994 50-kilometer (31 mi) Channel Tunnel.

=== Connections to the rest of the world ===
This excludes the cost of new roads and railways to reach the bridge. Aside from the technical challenges of building two 40-kilometer (25 mi) bridges or a more than 80-kilometer (50 mi) tunnel across the strait, another major challenge is that, as of 2022, there is nothing on either side of the Bering Strait to connect the bridge to.

The Russian side of the strait, in particular, is severely lacking in infrastructure. No railways exist for over 2,800 kilometers (1,700 mi) in any direction from the strait. The nearest major connecting highway is the M56 Kolyma Highway, which is currently unpaved and around 2,000 kilometers (1,200 mi) from the strait. However, by 2042, the Anadyr Highway is expected to be completed, connecting Ola and Anadyr, which is only about 600 kilometers (370 mi) from the strait.

On the U.S. side, an estimated 1,200 kilometers (750 mi) of highways or railroads would have to be built around Norton Sound, through a pass along the Unalakleet River, and along the Yukon River to connect to Manley Hot Springs Road – in other words, a route similar to that of the Iditarod Trail Race. A project to connect Nome, 160 kilometers (100 mi) from the strait, to the rest of Alaska by a paved highway (part of Alaska Route 2) has been proposed by the Alaskan state government, although the very high cost ($2.3 to $2.7 billion, about $3 million per kilometer, or $5 million per mile) has so far prevented construction.

In 2016, the Alaskan road network was extended westwards by 80 kilometers (50 mi) to Tanana, 740 kilometers (460 mi) from the strait, by building a relatively simple road. The Alaska Department of Transportation & Public Facilities project was supported by local indigenous groups such as the Tanana Tribal Council.

==== Track gauge ====
Russia uses a different track gauge from the US and Canada — colors indicate different gauges in use by country.

Another complicating factor is the different track gauges in use. Mainline rail in the US, Canada, China, and the Koreas uses a standard gauge of 1,435 mm (4 ft 8 1/2 in). Russia uses the slightly broader Russian gauge of 1,520 mm (4 ft 11 27/32 in).
Solutions to this break of gauge include:

- To have all cargo in containers, which are fairly easily reloaded from one train to another. This is used on the increasingly popular China–Europe rail freight route, which has two breaks of gauge. It is possible to transfer a 60-container train in one hour.
- Another solution is variable gauge axles for locomotives and rolling stock, such as those made by Talgo. A gauge changer modifies the gauge of the wheels while the train traverses the GC equipment at a speed of 15 km/h (9.3 mph), which is about 4 seconds per railcar. This is faster than is possible with the transfer of ISO containers.

== The TKM–World Link ==
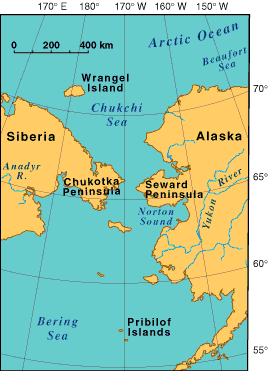
Map showing the proximity of the Chukchi Peninsula in Russia to the Seward Peninsula in the United States. The Diomede Islands between the two are not shown.

The TKM–World Link (Russian: ТрансКонтинентальная магистраль, English: Transcontinental Railway), also called ICL-World Link (Intercontinental link), was a planned 6,000-kilometer (3,700 mi) link between Siberia and Alaska to deliver oil, natural gas, electricity, and rail passengers to the United States from Russia. Proposed in 2007, the plan included provisions to build a 103-kilometer (64 mi) tunnel under the Bering Strait, which, if built, would have been the longest rail tunnel in the world, surpassing the 60-kilometer (37 mi) Line 3 (Guangzhou Metro) tunnel. The tunnel was intended to be part of a railway joining Yakutsk, the capital of the Russian republic of Yakutia, and Komsomolsk-on-Amur, in the Russian Far East, with the western coast of Alaska. The Bering Strait tunnel was estimated to cost between $10 billion and $12 billion, while the entire project was estimated to cost $65 billion.

In 2008, Russian Prime Minister Vladimir Putin approved the plan to build a railway to the Bering Strait area, as part of a development plan to run until 2030. The more than 100-kilometer (60 mi) tunnel would have run under the Bering Strait between Chukotka, in the Russian far east, and Alaska. The cost was estimated as $66 billion.

In late August 2011, at a conference in Yakutsk in eastern Russia, the plan was backed by some of President Dmitry Medvedev's top officials, including Aleksandr Levinthal, the deputy federal representative for the Russian Far East. Supporters of the idea believed that it would be a faster, safer, and cheaper way to move freight around the world than container ships. They estimated it could carry about 3% of global freight and make about $7 billion a year. Shortly after, the Russian government approved the construction of the $65 billion Siberia-Alaska rail and tunnel across the Bering Strait.

Observers doubted that the rail link would be cheaper than transport by shipping, bearing in mind that the cost for rail transport from China to Europe is higher than by ship (except for expensive cargo where lead time is important).

In 2013, the Amur–Yakutsk Mainline connecting the Yakutsk railway (2,800 km or 1,700 mi from the strait) with the Trans-Siberian Railway was completed. However, this railway is meant for freight and is too tightly curved for high-speed passenger trains. Future projects include the Lena–Kamchatka Mainline and Kolyma–Anadyr highway. The Kolyma–Anadyr highway has started construction, but will be a narrow gravel road.

== US–Canada–Russia–China railway ==
In 2014, China was considering the construction of a US-Canada-Russia-China 350 km/h (220 mph) bullet train that would be 13.000 kilometers (8,078 miles) long and would include a 200-kilometer (120 mi) underwater tunnel crossing the Bering Strait, allowing passengers to travel between the United States and China in approximately two days.

Although the press was skeptical of the project, China's government-run media agency, China Daily, claimed that China possessed the necessary technology. It was unknown who was expected to pay for the construction, although China had, in multiple other construction projects, offered money and assistance to build and finance them; however, upon the projects' completion, it regularly demanded the return of the money through fees or rents.

== Trans-Eurasian Belt Development ==
In 2015, another possible collaboration between China and Russia was reported, part of the Trans-Eurasian Belt Development, a transportation corridor across Siberia that would also include a road bridge with gas and oil pipelines between the easternmost point of Siberia and the westernmost point of Alaska. It would link London and New York by rail and superhighway via Russia if it were to go ahead.

China's Belt and Road Initiative has similar plans, so the project would work in parallel for both countries.

== See also ==
- Alaska-Alberta Railway Development Corporation
- Artificial island
- Beringia
- Cosmopolitan Railway
- Eurasian Land Bridge
- Intercontinental and transoceanic fixed links
- Land reclamation
- List of straits
- Pan-American Highway
- Transportation in Alaska
- Transport in Russia
