= Cosmopolitan Railway =

Proposed global railroad network

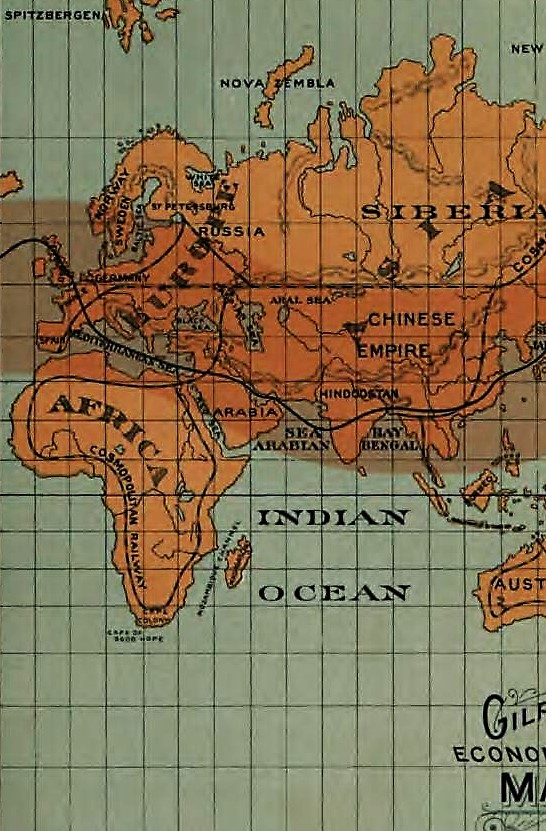
Part of an illustration from Gilpin's treatise

The Cosmopolitan Railway was a proposed global railroad network advocated by William Gilpin, formerly the first territorial governor of Colorado (1861–62), in his 1890 treatise Cosmopolitan Railway: Compacting and Fusing Together All the World's Continents. Gilpin named his capital city of Denver as the "railroad centre of the West".

== Components ==
Cosmopolitan Railway was one of the earliest documents envisioning a land route to Alaska, a vision that would first be realized (though not in the form of a railroad) in 1942, with the completion of the crude original version of the Alaska Highway. The document also proposed a bridge to Asia across the Bering Strait, a concept that has been dubbed the Intercontinental Peace Bridge, which would have been, and still would be, an enormously important link between the Eurasia-Africa and the Americas.

However, the formidable expense and difficulty of building such a bridge, and of building thousands of miles of new railroad through remote portions of Siberia, far northern North America, Africa, and other areas, have kept the plan as nothing more than a vision.

== See also ==
- Pan-American Highway
- Trans-Asian Railway
- Transcontinental railroad
- Intercontinental and transoceanic fixed links
