= Fatih Sultan Mehmet Bridge =

Suspension bridge in Istanbul, Turkey

Fatih Sultan Mehmet Bridge Fatih Sultan Mehmet Köprüsü
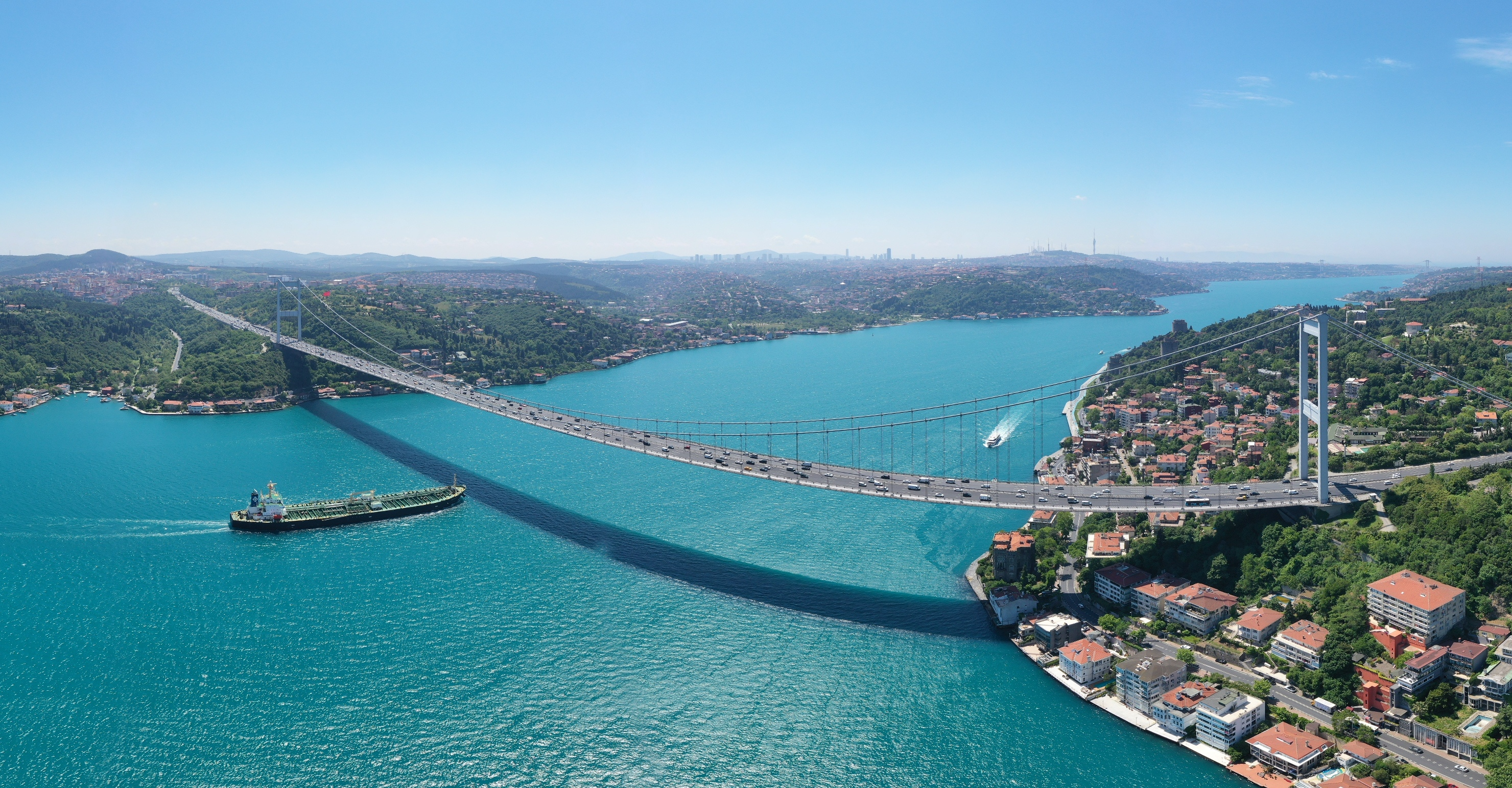
- Fatih Sultan Mehmet Bridge in Istanbul, connecting Europe and Asia
- Coordinates: 41.0913°N 29.062°E
- Carries: 8 lanes of O-2 (a part of the Trans-European Motorways)
- Crosses: Bosphorus strait
- Locale: Istanbul
- Official name: Fatih Sultan Mehmet Köprüsü
- Other name: Second Bosphorus Bridge
- Maintained by: Turkish State Highways

Characteristics
- Design: Suspension bridge
- Material: Steel
- Total length: 1,510 m (4,950 ft)
- Width: 39 m (128 ft)
- Height: 105 m (344 ft)
- Longest span: 1,090 m (3,580 ft)
- Clearance above: 64 m (210 ft)

History
- Designer: BOTEK Bosphorus Technical Consulting Corp. Freeman Fox & Partners
- Construction start: March 29, 1985
- Construction end: May 29, 1988
- Construction cost: US$380,000,000
- Opened: July 3, 1988

Statistics
- Toll: HGS

Location
- Interactive map of Fatih Sultan Mehmet Bridge

The Fatih Sultan Mehmet Bridge ("Sultan Mehmed the Conqueror Bridge"; Turkish: Fatih Sultan Mehmet Köprüsü, abbreviated as F.S.M. Köprüsü), also known as the Second Bosphorus Bridge (İkinci Köprü), is a bridge in Istanbul, Turkey spanning the Bosphorus Strait (Turkish: Boğaziçi). When completed in 1988, it was the 5th-longest suspension bridge span in the world.

The bridge is named after the 15th-century Ottoman Sultan Mehmed the Conqueror, who conquered the Byzantine capital, Constantinople (Istanbul), in 1453. It carries the European route E80, Asian Highway 1, Asian Highway 5 and Otoyol 2 highways.

Three other bridges that connect Europe and Asia are located in Turkey, which are named Yavuz Sultan Selim Bridge, 15 July Martyrs Bridge (formerly known as Bosphorus Bridge) and the 1915 Çanakkale Bridge.

== Location ==
The bridge is situated between Istanbul Hisarüstü (European side) and Kavacık (Asian side). It is a gravity-anchored suspension bridge with steel pylons and vertical hangers. The aerodynamic deck hangs on double vertical steel cables. It is 1,510 m long with a deck width of 39 m. The distance between the towers (main span) is 1,090 m and their height over the road level is 105 m. The clearance of the bridge from sea level is 64 m.

== Construction ==
The bridge was designed by Freeman Fox & Partners and BOTEK Bosphorus Technical Consulting Corp., who had previously designed the Bosphorus Bridge. An international consortium of three Japanese companies (including IHI Corporation and Mitsubishi Heavy Industries), one Italian (Impregilo) and one Turkish company (STFA) carried out the construction works. The bridge was completed on 29 May 1988, and later opened on 3 June 1988 by Prime Minister Turgut Özal, who drove his official car, becoming the first to cross. The cost of the bridge is estimated to be around US$130 million to 380 million.

== Transportation ==
The bridge is on the Trans-European Motorway between Edirne and Ankara. The highway bridge has eight lanes for vehicular traffic. Pedestrians are not allowed to use the bridge. Currently, around 150,000 vehicles pass daily in both directions; almost 70% are automobiles.

== Toll collection ==
Fatih Sultan Mehmet is a toll bridge, but payment is required only from vehicles traveling to Asia (as in the First Bosphorus Bridge, no payment is required while passing from Asia to Europe.) Since April 2008, cash payments are no longer accepted, having been replaced by a remote payment system. As of the OGS systems retirement on 31 March 2022, HGS is the only way to access the bridge.

A HGS sticker can be obtained at various stations before the toll plaza of highways and bridges.

As of 2024 the toll fee is 15 to 110 Turkish lira, depending on the type of vehicle.

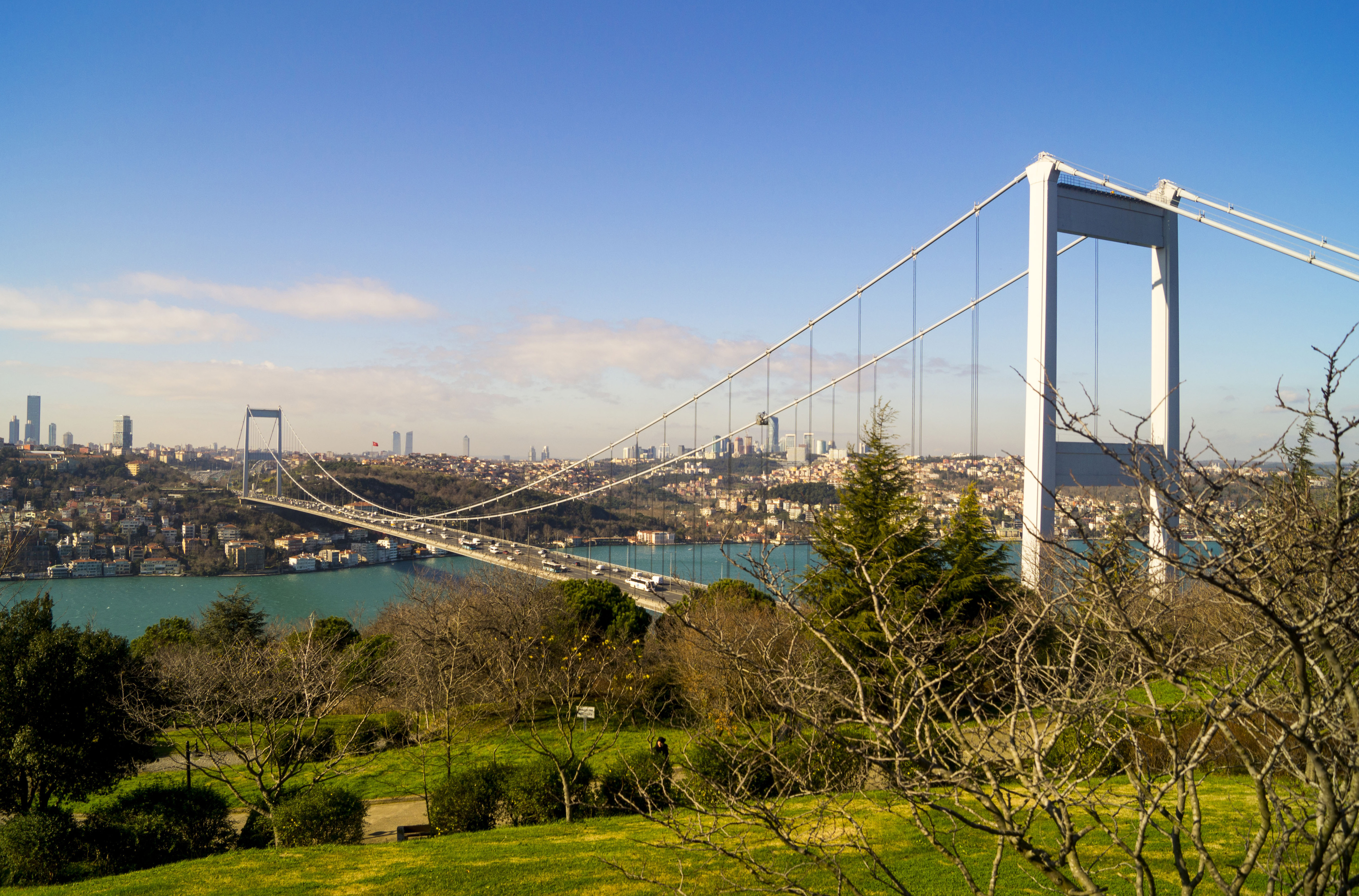
Fatih Sultan Mehmet Bridge and the skyscrapers of Levent (left) and Maslak (right) business districts

== See also ==
- Bosphorus Bridge
- Yavuz Sultan Selim Bridge
- Eurasia Tunnel, undersea tunnel, crossing the Bosphorus for vehicular traffic, opened in December 2016.
- Great Istanbul Tunnel, a proposed three-level road-rail undersea tunnel.
- 1915 Çanakkale Bridge, longest suspension bridge in the world in Çanakkale.
- Osman Gazi Bridge
- Marmaray, rail line connecting the Asian and European sides of Istanbul
- Public transport in Istanbul
- Rail transport in Turkey
- Turkish Straits
