= HGS (electronic toll collection) =

Electronic toll collection system in Turkey

The HGS sign used at booths

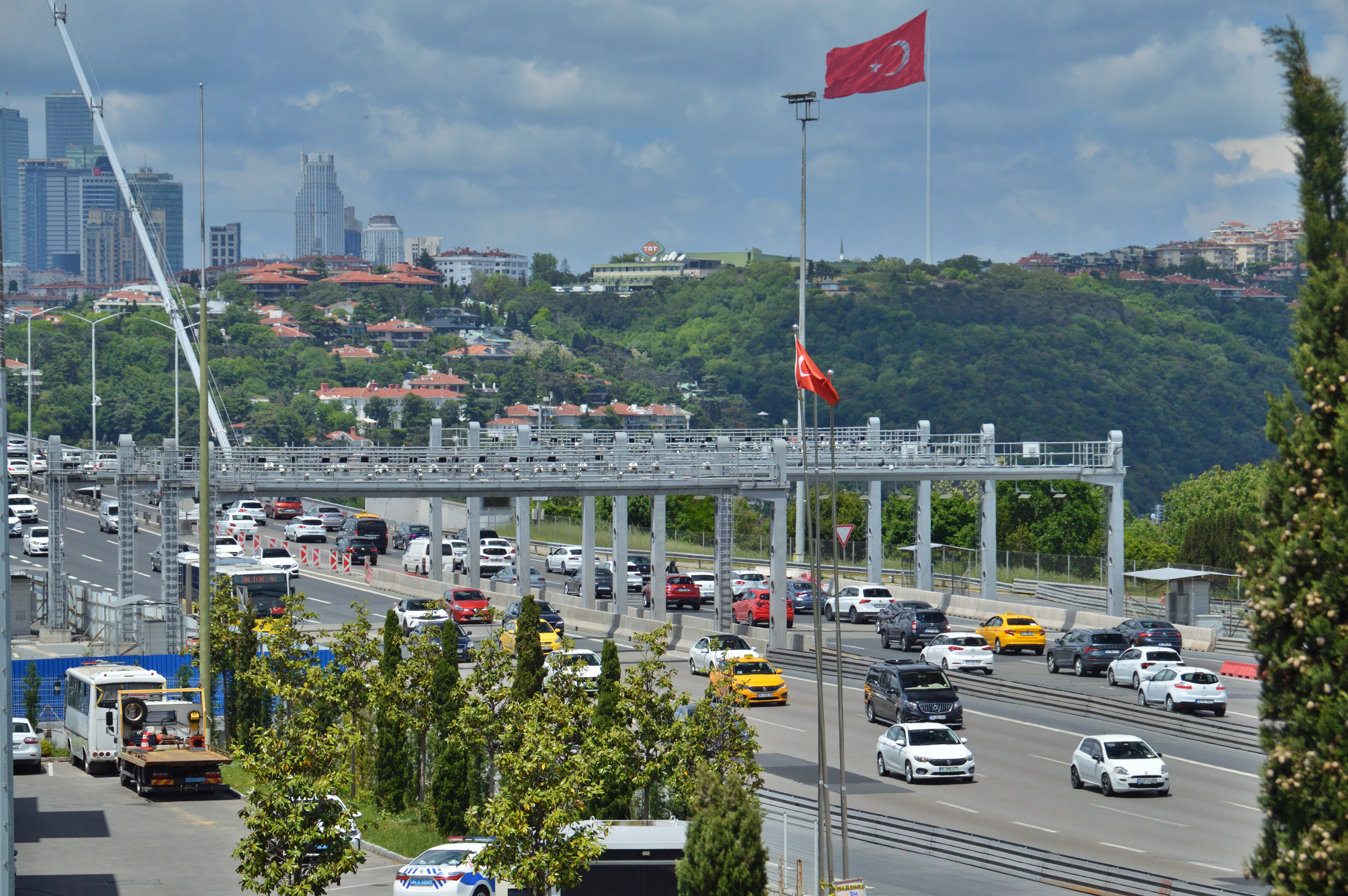
HGS sensors at the 15 July Martyrs Bridge in Istanbul.

HGS (Hızlı Geçiş Sistemi; English: Fast Pass System) is an electronic toll collection system of radio-frequency identification (RFID) transponder type available on toll roads and toll bridges in Turkey. It is obtainable in a sticker or card form. Payment is handled by antenna on the toll booth, which collect money from the account associated with the tag. Additionally, smart cameras are used to detect the license plate and class of the vehicle. Despite these features, HGS is more cost-efficient compared to the OGS system.

It was implemented in September 17, 2012 to replace the slow KGS which needed drivers to stop at the booth to pay for the toll and caused congestion during rush hour. KGS was fully phased out by February 2013.

It was used alongside the OGS (electronic toll collection) system, although OGS was retired on March 31, 2022.

== HGS cards ==
The cards used for the HGS consists of two types, stickers and cards. The technology used in the system is passive RFID. It is an unpowered, thin chipped sticker which is fixed on the windshield of the car.

== Obtaining ==
HGS stickers or cards can be obtained through PTT locations or approved banks country wide. While applying for HGS, the user needs to present their registration and their identity card.

In Turkey, vehicles are classified in five classes at bridges and motorways. As of 2024, the fee for the sticker is ₺60 and the card is ₺85. The system initially required a minimum deposit of ₺30, but this was lifted after backlash in 2012.

Prices change depending on distance and vehicle class. Vehicle classes are listed on the table below.

Vehicle Class	Vehicles included in the class
I. Class Vehicles	Vehicles that have an axle distance of less than 3.20 meters
II. Class Vehicles	Vehicles that have an axle distance longer than 3.20 meters and have two axles
III. Class Vehicles	Vehicles that have three axles
IV. Class Vehicles	Vehicles that have four or five axles
V. Class Vehicles	Vehicles that have six or more axles
VI. Class Vehicles	Motorcycles

The system is able to detect disabled axles during passing and charges the card accordingly.

== Payment ==
The HGS system functions on a prepaid model, mandating users to maintain an adequate balance to cover entrance fees. Failure to do so within a 15-day window may lead to legal repercussions. Passages lacking the necessary balance incur a penalty fee four times the standard rate if the balance is not added to the account within the specified timeframe.

== See also ==
- OGS (electronic toll collection)
- KGS (electronic toll collection)
- International E-road network
- Asian Highway Network
- List of otoyol routes in Turkey
- General Directorate of Highways (Turkey)
- List of motorway tunnels in Turkey
- Transport in Turkey
- Otoyol
