= Persian Gulf Bridge =

Persian Gulf Bridge پل خلیج فارس
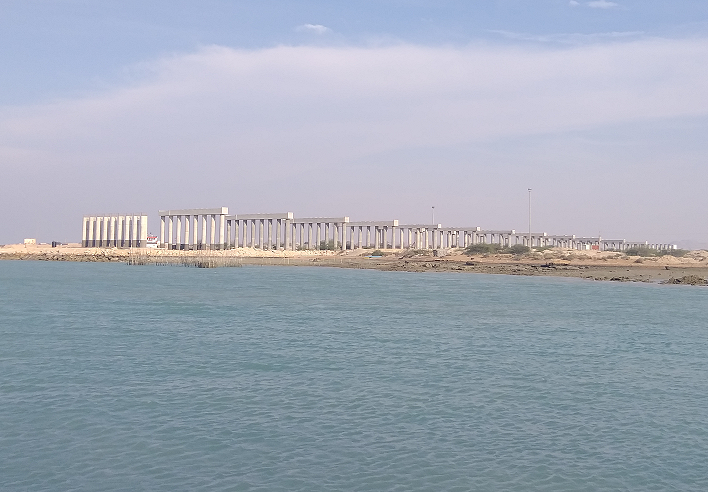
- construction project in April 2023
- Coordinates: 26°57′45″N 55°45′35″E
- Crosses: Persian Gulf
- Locale: Qeshm–Bandar Abbas, Iran
- Other name: Qeshm Bridge

Characteristics
- Total length: 3.4 km
- Width: 22 m

History
- Construction start: 14 March 2011
- Construction end: 2023/24
- Construction cost: €450 million

Location
- Interactive map of Persian Gulf Bridge

The Persian Gulf Bridge is a 2.4 km- (1.5 mi-) long road-rail bridge currently under construction, which will link Qeshm Island to Bandar Abbas on mainland Iran. The groundbreaking ceremony for the project was attended by the former President of Iran, Mahmoud Ahmadinejad on 14 March 2011. It will connect Qeshm Island from the historic port of Laft to Bandar Pol in Bandar Abbas in Hormozgan province. It is being built by an Iranian company at a cost of € 450 million. It will also connect Qeshm to the main transit corridor linking the Caspian port of Anzali to Bandar Abbas and Chabahar on the Gulf of Oman. Due to several delays caused by disputes and concerns raised by environmentalists, and also due to COVID-19 pandemic, the project was expected to be completed at least by 2016/17, but it is now expected to be completed by 2026.

== Significance ==
The project is vital to economic and industrial development of Qeshm, Iran's biggest island. The rail section will be used to transport 7 million metric tons of iron ore per year to produce 3.5 million tons of steel on the island. It will help to boost tourism in the island as well, by enhancing connectivity and boosting employment.

== Tunnel proposal ==
The project, however, was halted at the order of the former president, Mahmoud Ahmadinejad, who proposed to build an undersea tunnel instead of a bridge. The proposal was finally rejected because of high costs, advanced technology and potential risks involved. The bridge was finally approved and started construction in 2011.
