= Zanzibar Bridge =

Proposed bridge linking Zanzibar and mainland Tanzania

- Coordinates: 6.451°S 39.1969°E

Characteristics
- Total length: 50 kilometres (31 mi)

Location
- Interactive map of Zanzibar Bridge

The Zanzibar Bridge is a proposed bridge connecting Unguja, the main island of Zanzibar, with the Tanzanian mainland near Dar es Salaam.

== Background ==
There are no ground transport links between the Zanzibar archipelago and the rest of Tanzania, with transport options limited to flights and ferries. In 2011, the ferries MV Spice Islander I and MV Skagit sank with hundreds of lives lost.

Proposals for the bridge date back to 2020. If built, the bridge would be 50 kilometres (31 mi) long and by far the longest in Africa, eclipsing the 20.5 kilometres (12.7 mi) 6th October Bridge in Cairo, Egypt.

In May 2023, Geoffrey Kasekenya, deputy minister of Works and Transport, announced in Parliament that talks with China Overseas Engineering Group were in "advanced stages". At the time, the cost of the project was estimated at US$2.7 billion, funded as a public-private partnership with the assistance of the African Development Bank, and a target completion date of 2028.

As of 2025, the project has made "little progress" and the Tanzanian government has not indicated when construction would start.
