= Bosphorus Bridge =

Bridge spanning the Bosphorus strait in Istanbul, Turkey

Bosphorus Bridge 15 Temmuz Şehitler Köprüsü
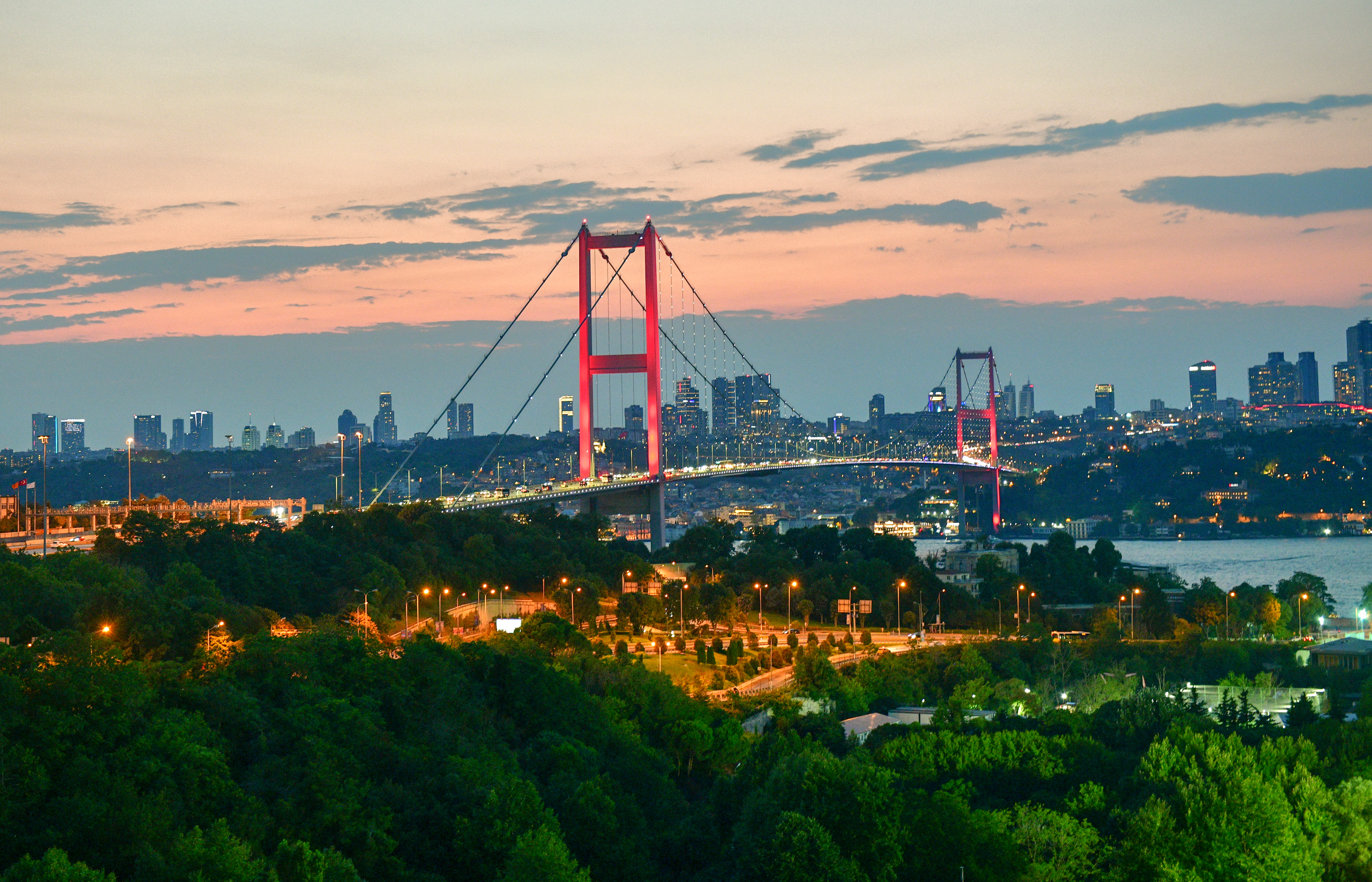
- The Bosphorus Bridge in Istanbul spans the Bosphorus strait and connects Europe and Asia
- Coordinates: 41°02′43″N 29°02′04″E
- Carries: 6 lanes of O-1
- Crosses: Bosphorus strait
- Locale: Istanbul
- Official name: 15 July Martyrs Bridge
- Other name: First Bridge
- Maintained by: General Directorate of Highways

Characteristics
- Design: Suspension bridge
- Material: Steel
- Total length: 1,560 m (5,118 ft)
- Width: 33.40 m (110 ft)
- Height: 165 m (541 ft)
- Longest span: 1,074 m (3,524 ft)
- Clearance below: 64 m (210 ft)

History
- Designer: Gilbert Roberts; William Brown; Michael Parsons
- Engineering design by: Freeman Fox & Partners; Enka Construction & Industry; Cleveland Bridge & Engineering Company; Hochtief AG
- Construction start: 20 February 1970
- Construction end: 1 June 1973
- Opened: 30 October 1973

Statistics
- Daily traffic: 200,000
- Toll: 47 Turkish lira (€1.25 as of 13 January 2025)

Location
- Interactive map of Bosphorus Bridge

The Bosphorus Bridge (Turkish: Boğaziçi Köprüsü), known officially as the 15 July Martyrs Bridge (Turkish: 15 Temmuz Şehitler Köprüsü) and colloquially as the First Bridge (Turkish: Birinci Köprü), is the oldest and southernmost of the three suspension bridges spanning the Bosphorus strait (Turkish: Boğaziçi) in Istanbul, Turkey, thus connecting Europe and Asia (alongside the Fatih Sultan Mehmet Bridge and Yavuz Sultan Selim Bridge). The bridge extends between Ortaköy (in Europe) and Beylerbeyi (in Asia).

It is a gravity-anchored suspension bridge with steel towers and inclined hangers. The aerodynamic deck hangs on steel cables. It is 1,560 m (5,118 ft) long with a deck width of 33.40 m (110 ft). The distance between the towers (main span) is 1,074 m (3,524 ft) and the total height of the towers is 165 m (541 ft). The clearance of the bridge from sea level is 64 m (210 ft).

Upon its completion in 1973, the Bosphorus Bridge had the fourth-longest suspension bridge span in the world, and the longest outside the United States (only the Verrazzano–Narrows Bridge, Golden Gate Bridge and Mackinac Bridge had a longer span in 1973). The Bosphorus Bridge remained the longest suspension bridge in Europe until the completion of the Humber Bridge in 1981, and the longest suspension bridge in Asia until the completion of the Fatih Sultan Mehmet Bridge (Second Bosphorus Bridge) in 1988 (which was surpassed by the Minami Bisan-Seto Bridge in 1989). Currently, the Bosphorus Bridge has the 45th-longest suspension bridge span in the world.

After a group of soldiers took control and partially closed off the bridge during the military coup d'état attempt on 15 July 2016, Prime Minister Binali Yıldırım announced on 25 July a cabinet decision that formally renamed the bridge as the 15 Temmuz Şehitler Köprüsü ("15 July Martyrs Bridge") in memory of those killed while resisting the attempted coup.

The Bosphorus Bridge is famous for its important transport routes, connecting parts of Europe to Turkey.

== Precedents and proposals ==
The idea of a bridge crossing the Bosphorus dates back to antiquity. The Greek writer Herodotus says in his Histories that, on the orders of Emperor Darius the Great of the Achaemenid Empire (522 BC–485 BC), Mandrocles of Samos once engineered a pontoon bridge across the Bosphorus, linking Asia to Europe; this bridge enabled Darius to pursue the fleeing Scythians as well as position his army in the Balkans to overwhelm Macedon. The first modern project for a permanent bridge across the Bosphorus was proposed to Sultan Abdul Hamid II of the Ottoman Empire by the Bosphorus Railroad Company in 1900, which included a rail link between the continents.

== Construction ==
The decision to build a bridge across the Bosphorus was taken in 1957 by Prime Minister Adnan Menderes. For the structural engineering work, a contract was signed with the British firm Freeman Fox & Partners in 1968. The bridge was designed by the British civil engineers Gilbert Roberts, William Brown and Michael Parsons, who also designed the Humber Bridge, Severn Bridge, and Forth Road Bridge. David B Steinman, an American engineer who had recently designed the Mackinac Bridge was also contracted, but died early on in the design process in 1960. Construction started in February 1970 and ceremonies were attended by President Cevdet Sunay and Prime Minister Süleyman Demirel. The bridge was built by the Turkish firm Enka Construction & Industry Co. along with the co-contractors Cleveland Bridge & Engineering Company (England) and Hochtief AG (Germany).

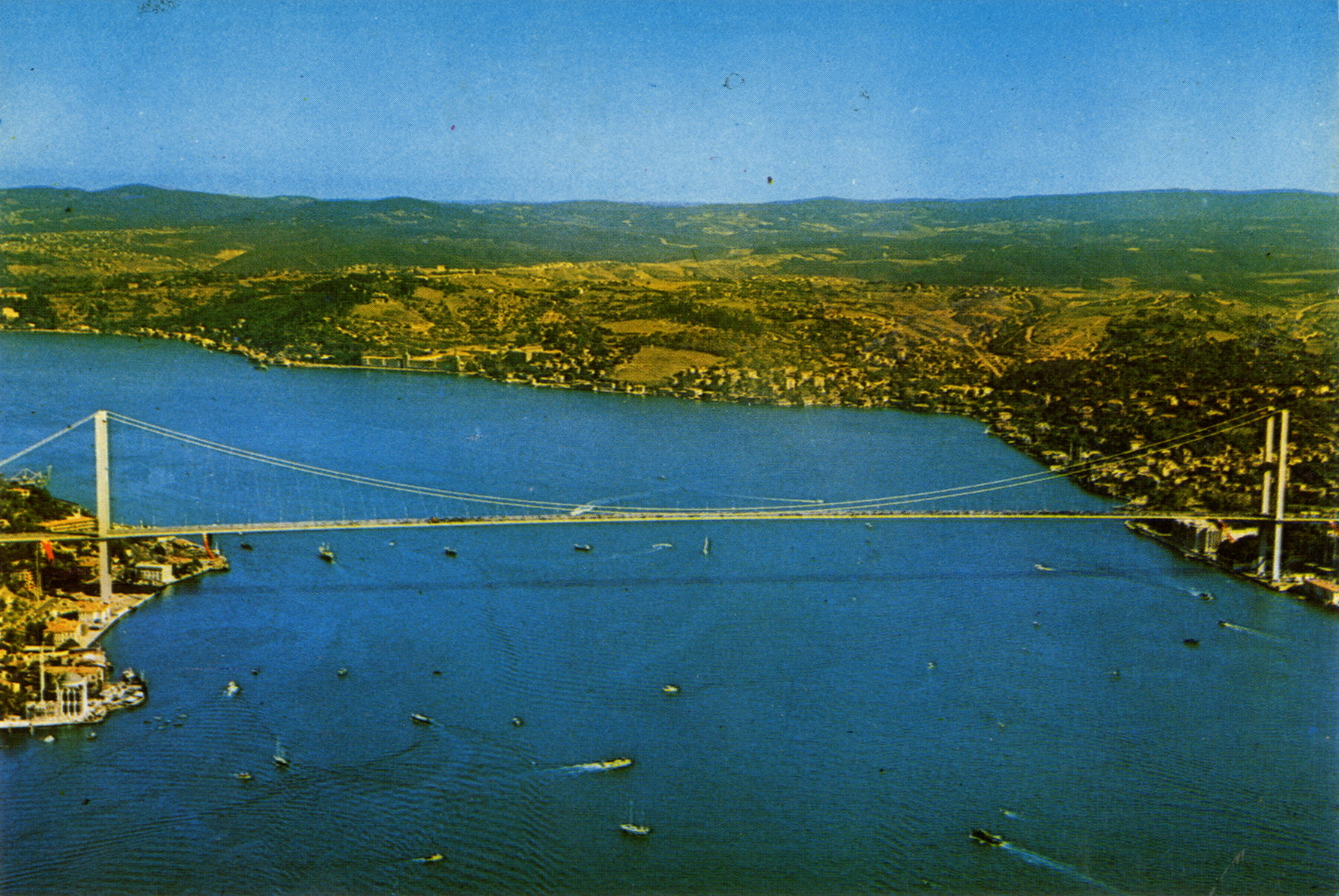
The Bosphorus Bridge in 1973

The bridge was completed on 30 October 1973, one day after the 50th anniversary of the founding of the Republic of Turkey, and opened by President Fahri Korutürk and Prime Minister Naim Talu. The cost of the bridge was US$200 million ($1.45 billion in 2025 dollars).

Upon the bridge's opening, it was often defined by the media as the first bridge between Asia and Europe since the pontoon bridge of Xerxes in 480 BC. That bridge, however, spanned the Hellespont (Dardanelles) strait to the southwest of the Bosphorus, across the Sea of Marmara, and was in fact the second pontoon bridge between Asia and Europe after an earlier one built by Darius the Great across the Bosphorus strait in 513 BC.

== Operation and tolls ==
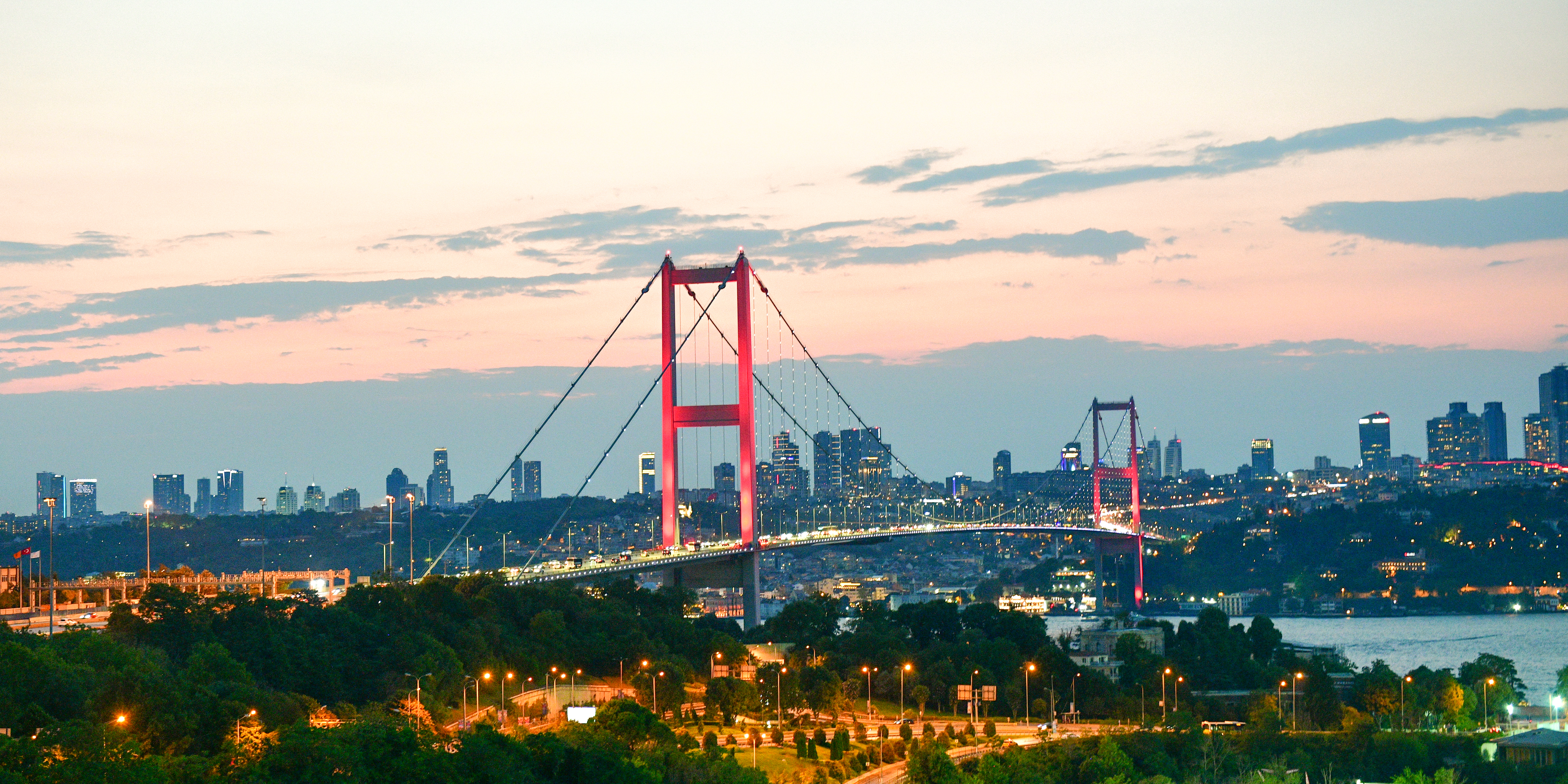
A view of the bridge at night

The bridge highway is eight lanes wide. Three standard lanes, one emergency lane and one pedestrian lane serve each direction. On weekday mornings, most commuter traffic flows westbound to Europe, so four of the six lanes run westbound and only two eastbound. Conversely, on weekday evenings, four lanes are dedicated to eastbound traffic and two lanes, to westbound traffic.

For the first three years, pedestrians could walk over the bridge, reaching it with elevators inside the towers on both sides. No pedestrians or commercial vehicles, such as trucks, are allowed to use the bridge today.

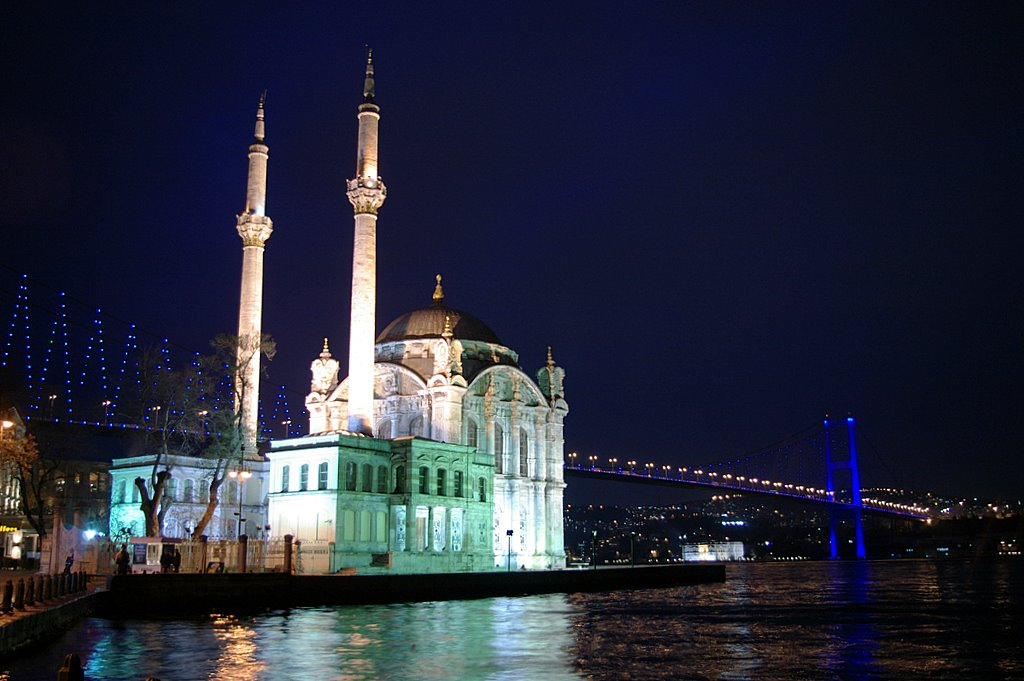
Ortaköy Mosque and the Bosphorus Bridge

Today, around 180,000 vehicles pass daily in both directions, with almost 85% being cars. On 29 December 1997, the one-billionth vehicle passed the bridge. Fully loaded, the bridge sags about 90 cm (35 in) in the middle of the span.

It is a toll bridge. Between 1973 and 2023 a toll was charged for passing from Europe to Asia, but not for passing in the reverse direction. Since January 1, 2023, a toll is charged for both directions.

Between 1999 and 2006, some of the toll booths (#9 - #13), which were located to the far left as motorists approached them, were unmanned and equipped only with a remote payment system (Turkish: OGS). In addition to the OGS system, another toll pay system with special contactless smart cards (Turkish: KGS) was installed at specific toll booths in 2005. Toll payments in cash were stopped on 3 April 2006.

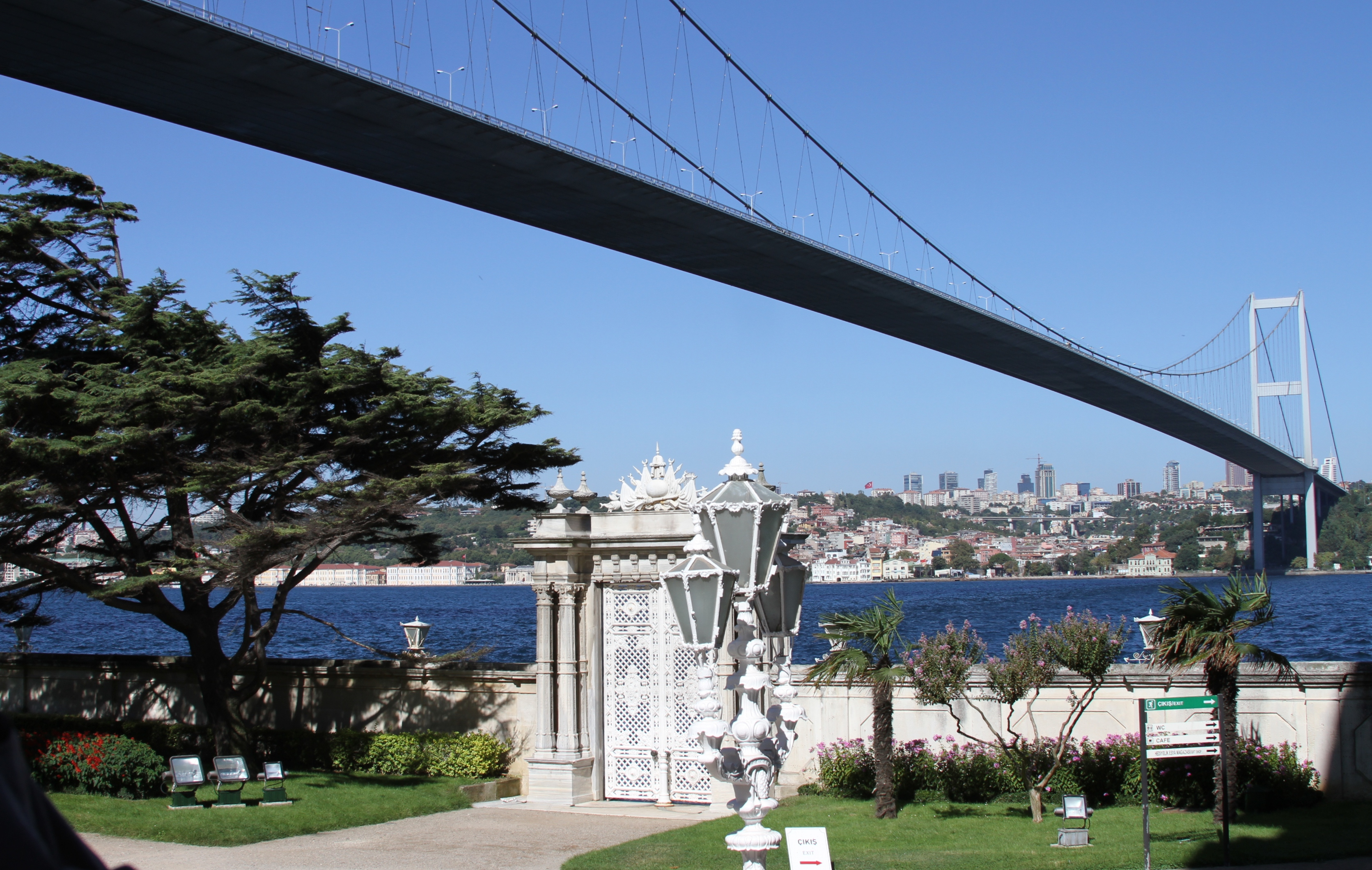
A view of the Bosphorus Bridge from Beylerbeyi Palace

Between 2006 and 2012, toll booths accepted only OGS or KGS. An OGS device or KGS card could be obtained at various stations before reaching the toll plazas of highways and bridges. In 2006, the toll was 3.00 TL or about $2.00.

Since April 2007, a computerised LED lighting system of changing colours and patterns, developed by Philips, illuminates the bridge at night.

On 17 September 2012, the KGS system on the Bosphorus Bridge was replaced by the new HGS system (Turkish: Hızlı Geçiş Sistemi), which also replaced the OGS system a decade later, on 31 March 2022. The HGS system requires a batteryless front window sticker with a passive radio-frequency identification (RFID) chip, whereas the older OGS system required a small RFID device with a battery that was stuck to the front window.

In 2017, the toll increased by nearly 50% from 4.75 to 7 TRY. After 21 months, in late 2019, the toll went up another 20% to 10.50 TRY. Tolls need to be increased almost every year to keep up with high producers' price inflation.

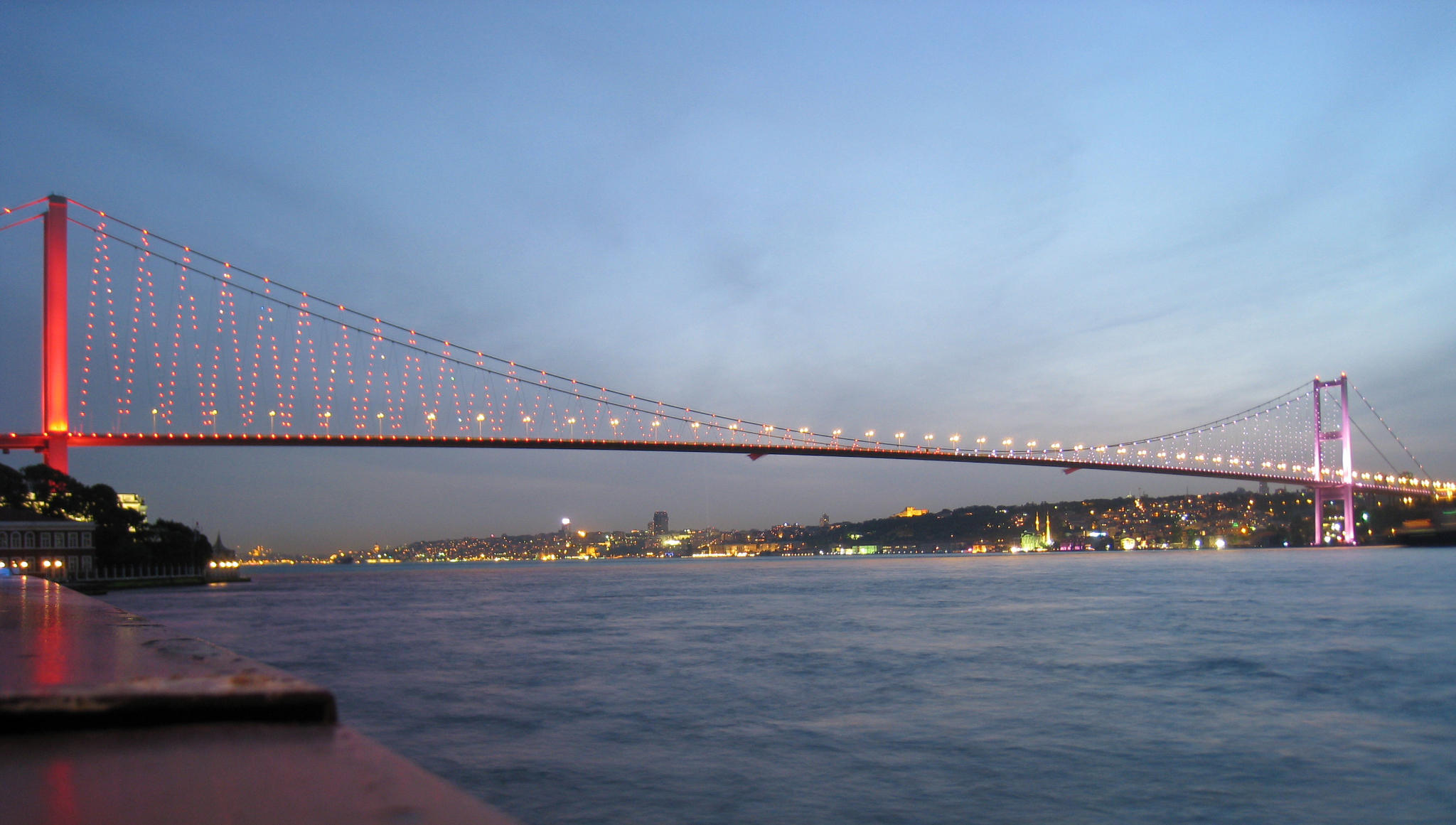
Since April 2007, a computerized LED lighting system, capable of changing colors and patterns, illuminates the bridge at night.

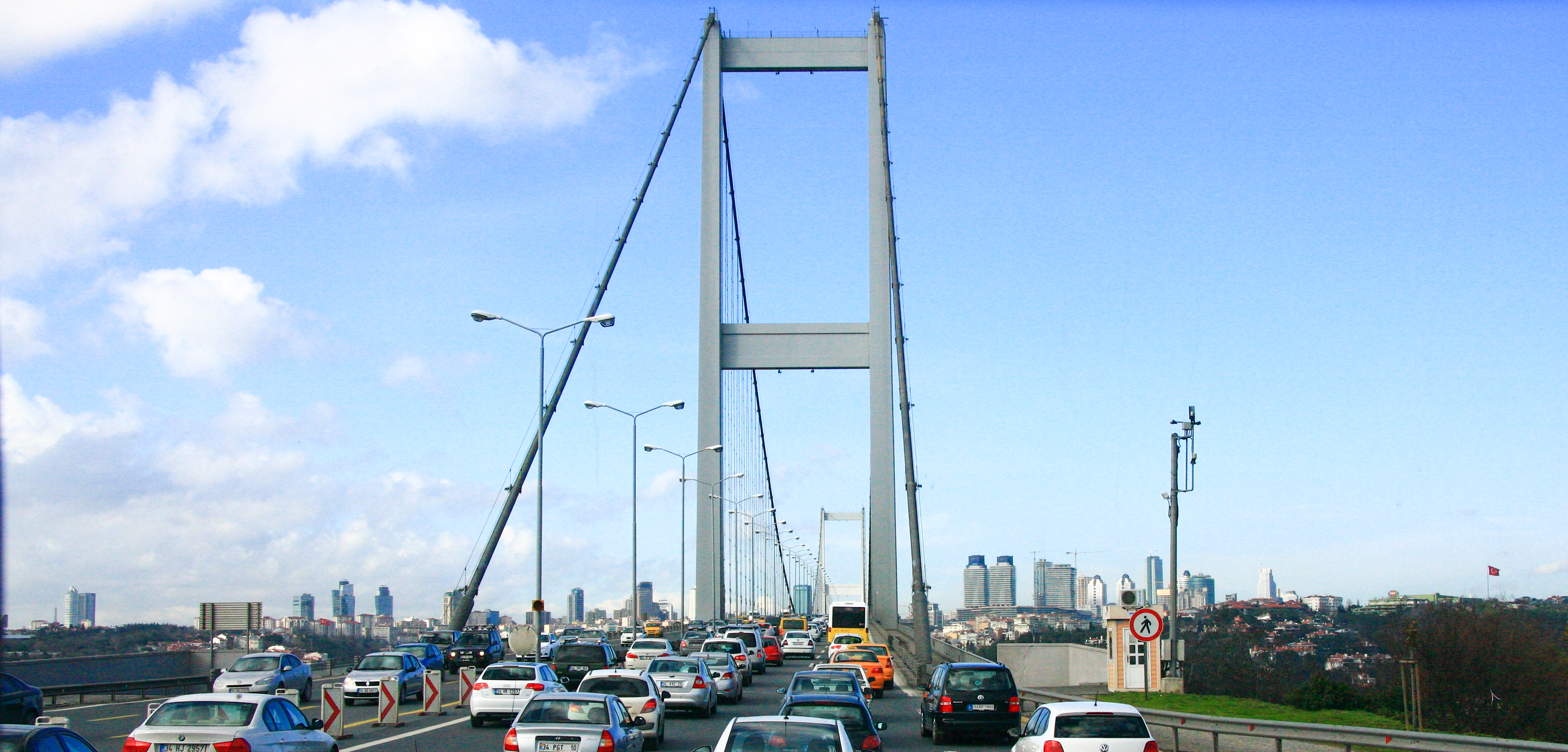
Daytime view of the Bosphorus Bridge

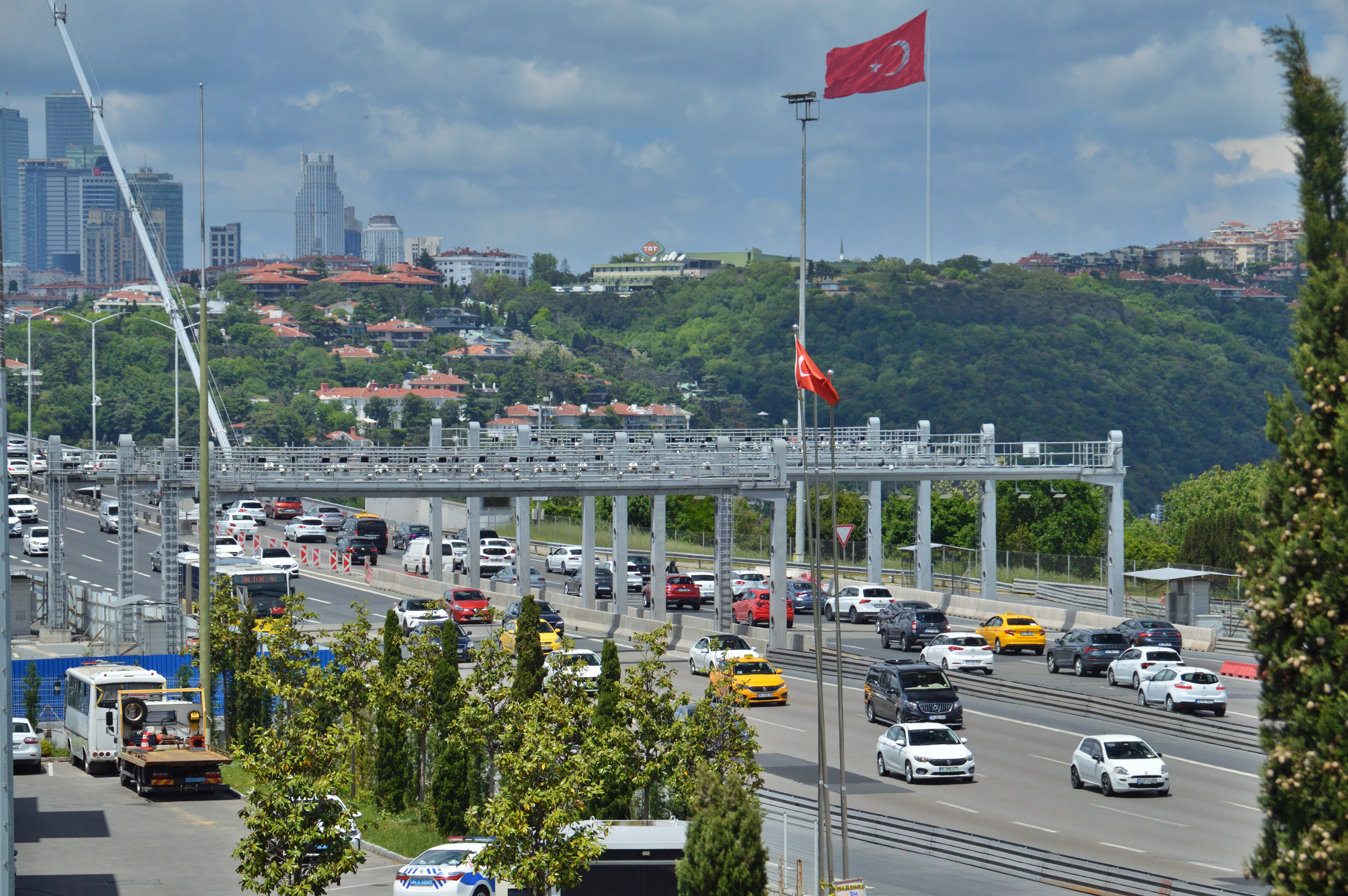
RFID tolls of the HGS system

== Notable events ==
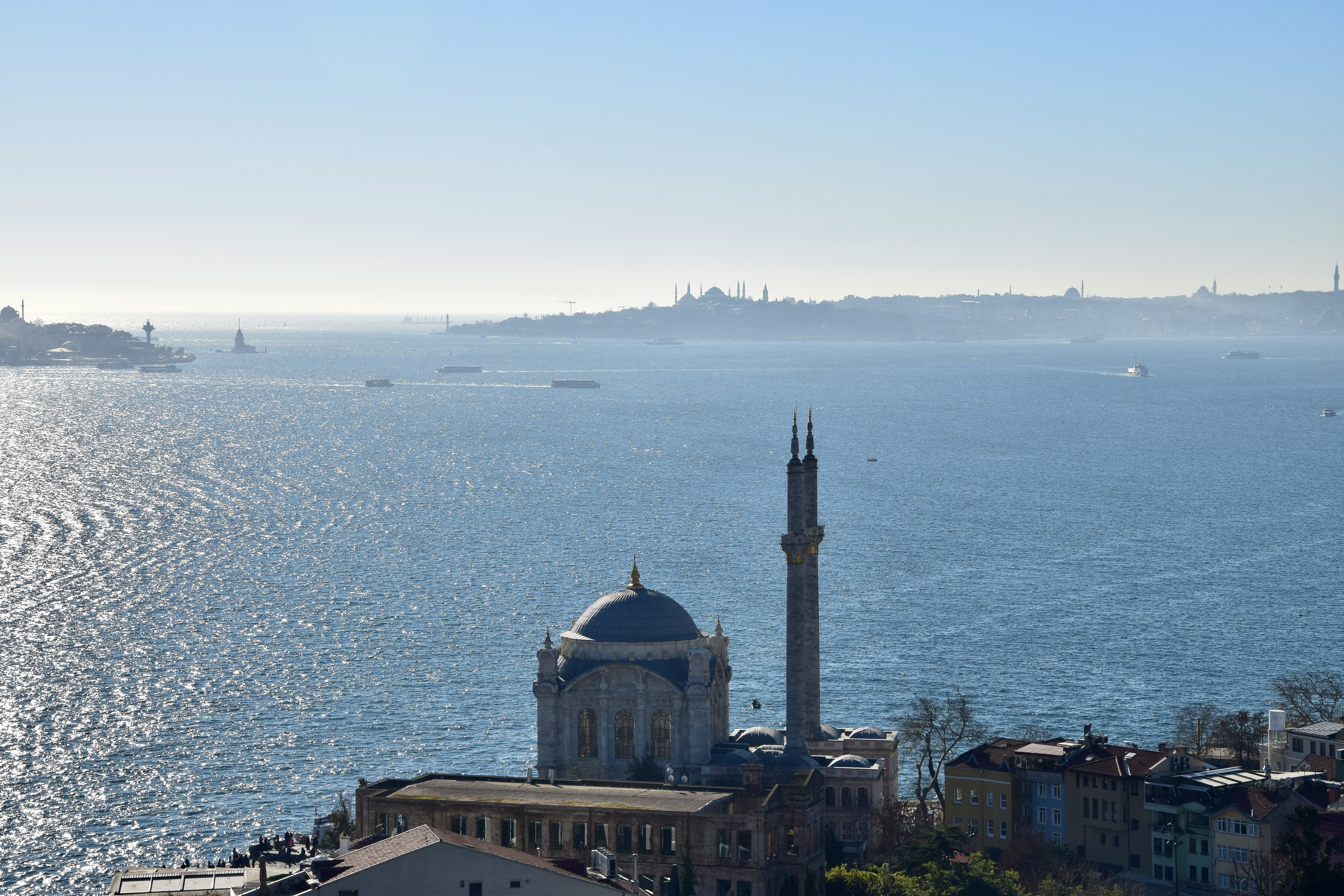
View of Ortaköy Mosque and the historical peninsula of Istanbul from the Bosphorus Bridge

The bridge was depicted on the reverse of the Turkish 1000 lira banknotes of 1978–1986.

Since 1979, every October, the annual Intercontinental Istanbul Eurasia Marathon crosses the bridge on its way from Asia to Europe. During the marathon, the bridge is closed to vehicular traffic.

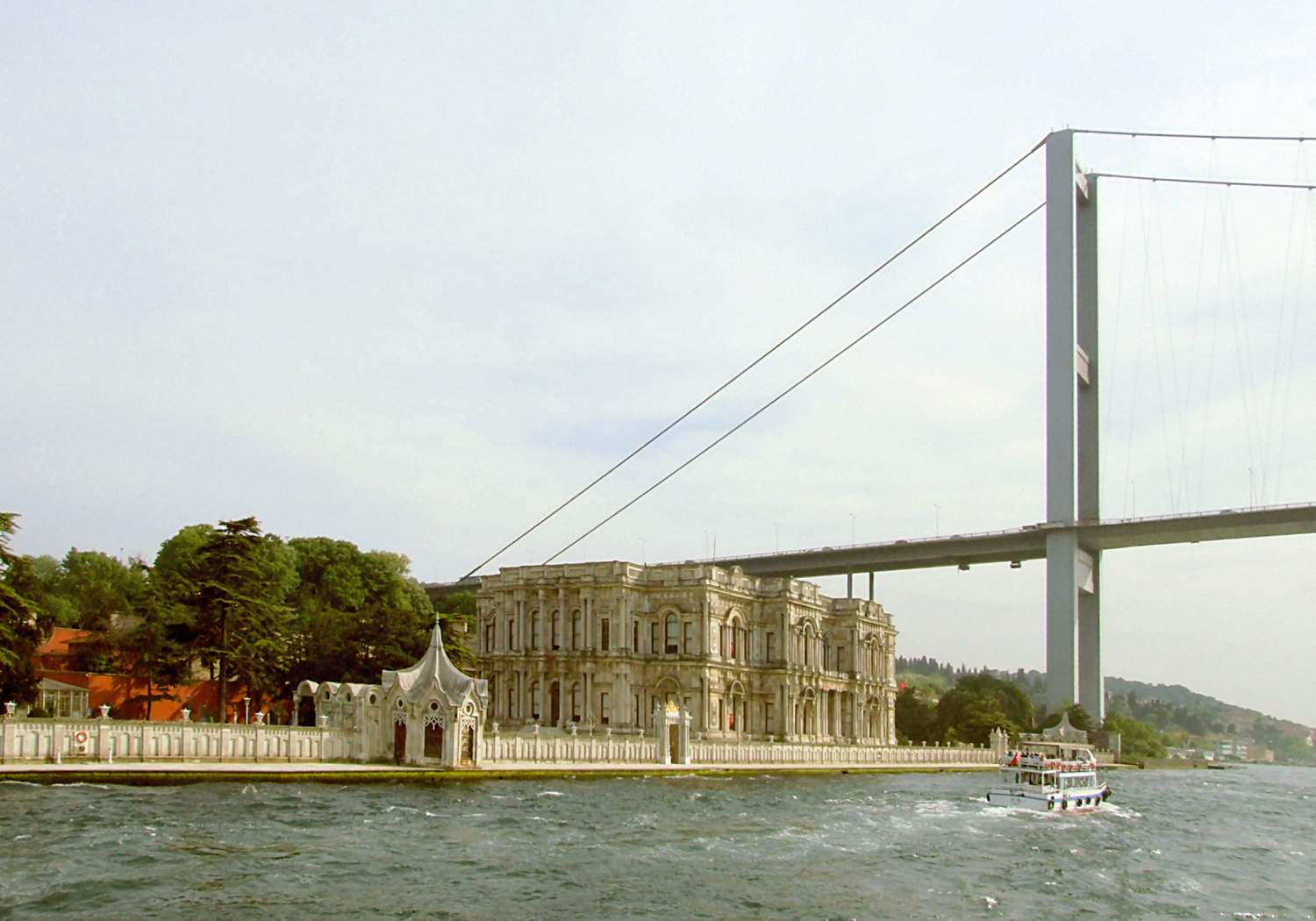
Beylerbeyi Palace and the Bosphorus Bridge

On 15 May 2005 at 07:00 local time, U.S. tennis star Venus Williams played a show game with Turkish player İpek Şenoğlu on the bridge, the first tennis match played on two continents. The event promoted the upcoming 2005 WTA İstanbul Cup and lasted five minutes. After the exhibition, they both threw a tennis ball into the Bosphorus.

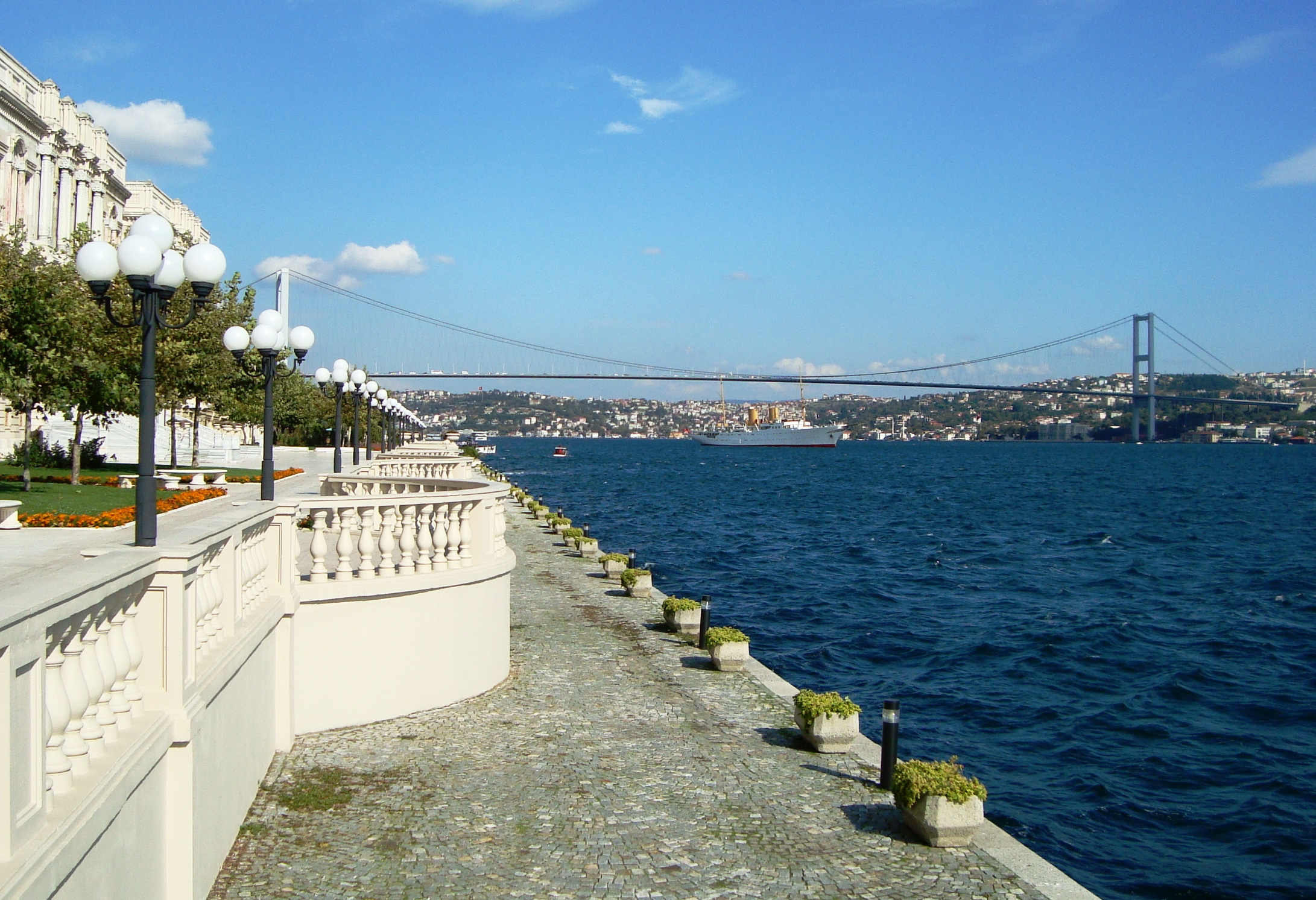
Çırağan Palace and the Bosphorus Bridge

On 17 July 2005 at 10:30 local time, British Formula One driver David Coulthard drove his Red Bull racing car across the bridge from the European side to the Asian side, then, after turning with a powerslide at the toll plaza, back to the European side for show. He parked his car in the garden of Dolmabahçe Palace where his ride had started. While crossing the bridge with his Formula 1 car, Coulthard was picked up by the automatic surveillance system and charged with a fine of 20 Euros because he passed through the toll booths without payment. His team agreed to pay for him.

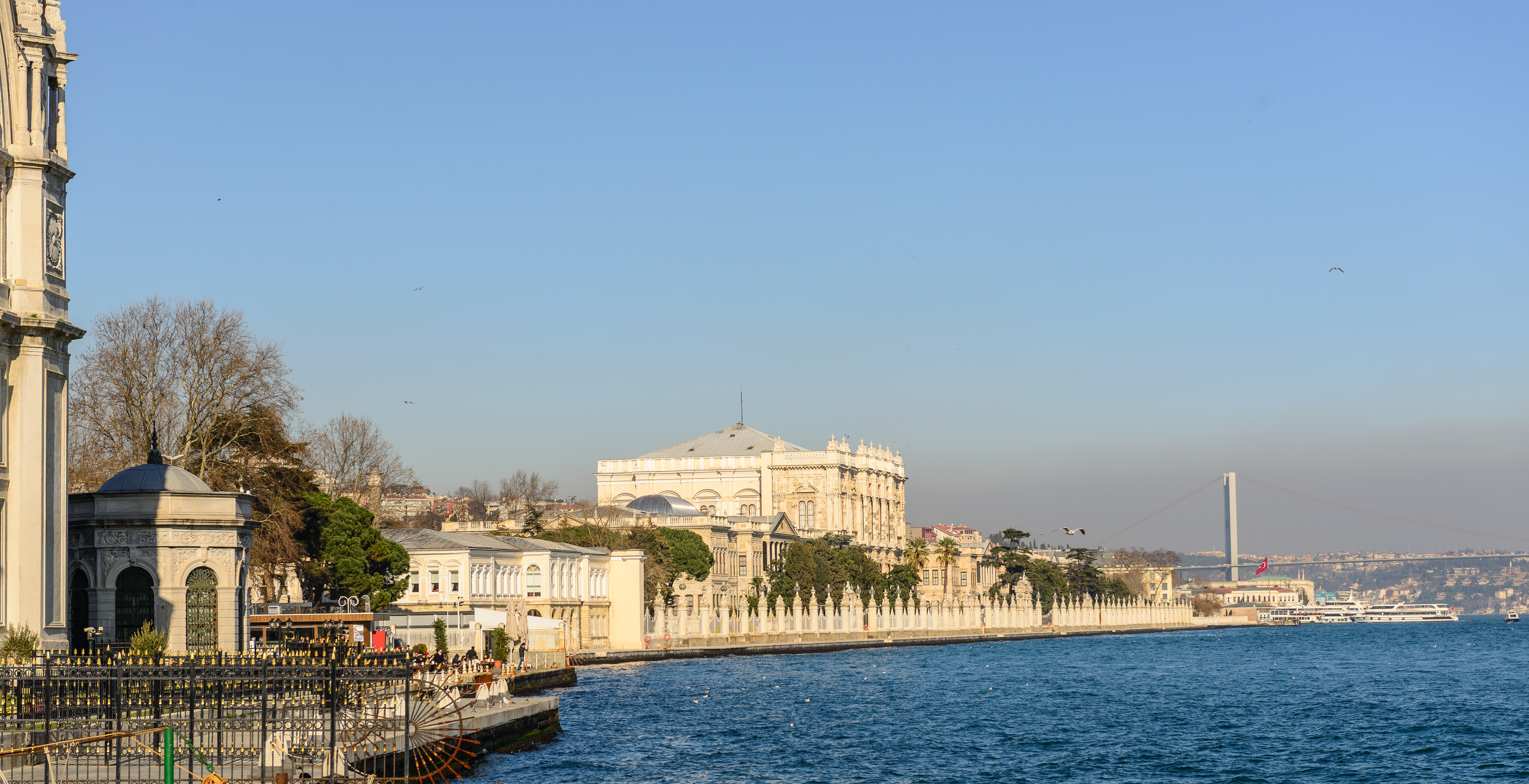
Dolmabahçe Palace and the Bosphorus Bridge

On 5 November 2013, World No. 1 golfer Tiger Woods, visiting for the 2013 Turkish Airlines Open golf tournament held between 7 and 10 November, was brought to the bridge by helicopter and made a couple of show shots on the bridge, hitting balls from the Asian side to the European side on one side of the bridge, which was closed to traffic for about one hour.

On 15 July 2016, the bridge was blocked by a rogue faction of the Turkish Armed Forces during a coup attempt. They is no proof that they arrested or killed civilians and police officers. The soldiers involved surrendered to police and to civilians the next day. Witnesses claimed the snipers that might have used non-military weapons did the shootings. On 25 July 2016, Binali Yıldırım, Turkey's last prime minister before a presidential system was adopted with a referendum in 2017, announced that the bridge would be renamed as the 15 Temmuz Şehitler Köprüsü (15 July Martyrs Bridge). In honor of the victims who were martyred while resisting the coup attempt, a monument, museum and mosque were built on a roadside hill near the Asian (Anatolian) end of the bridge.

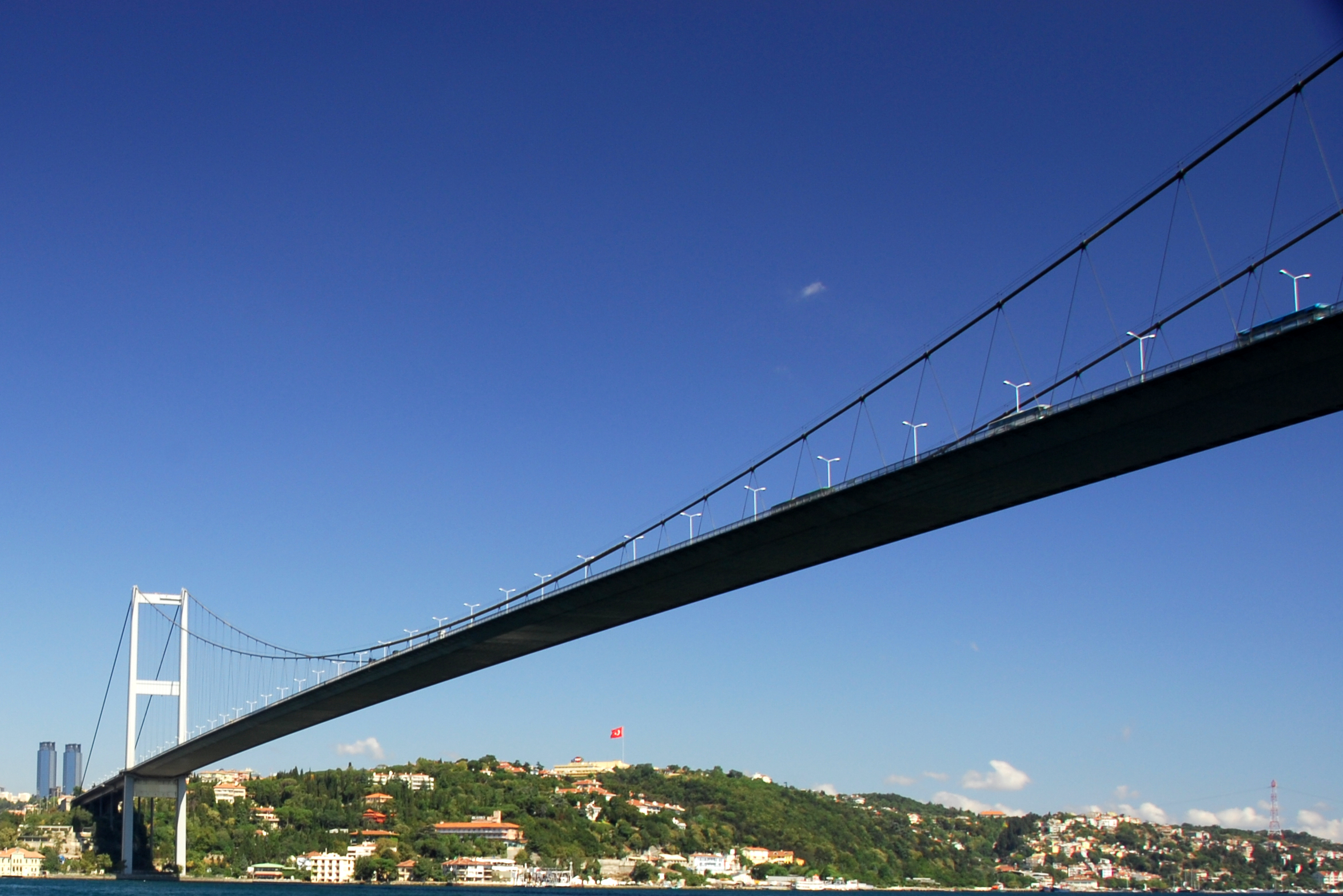
Daytime view of the bridge

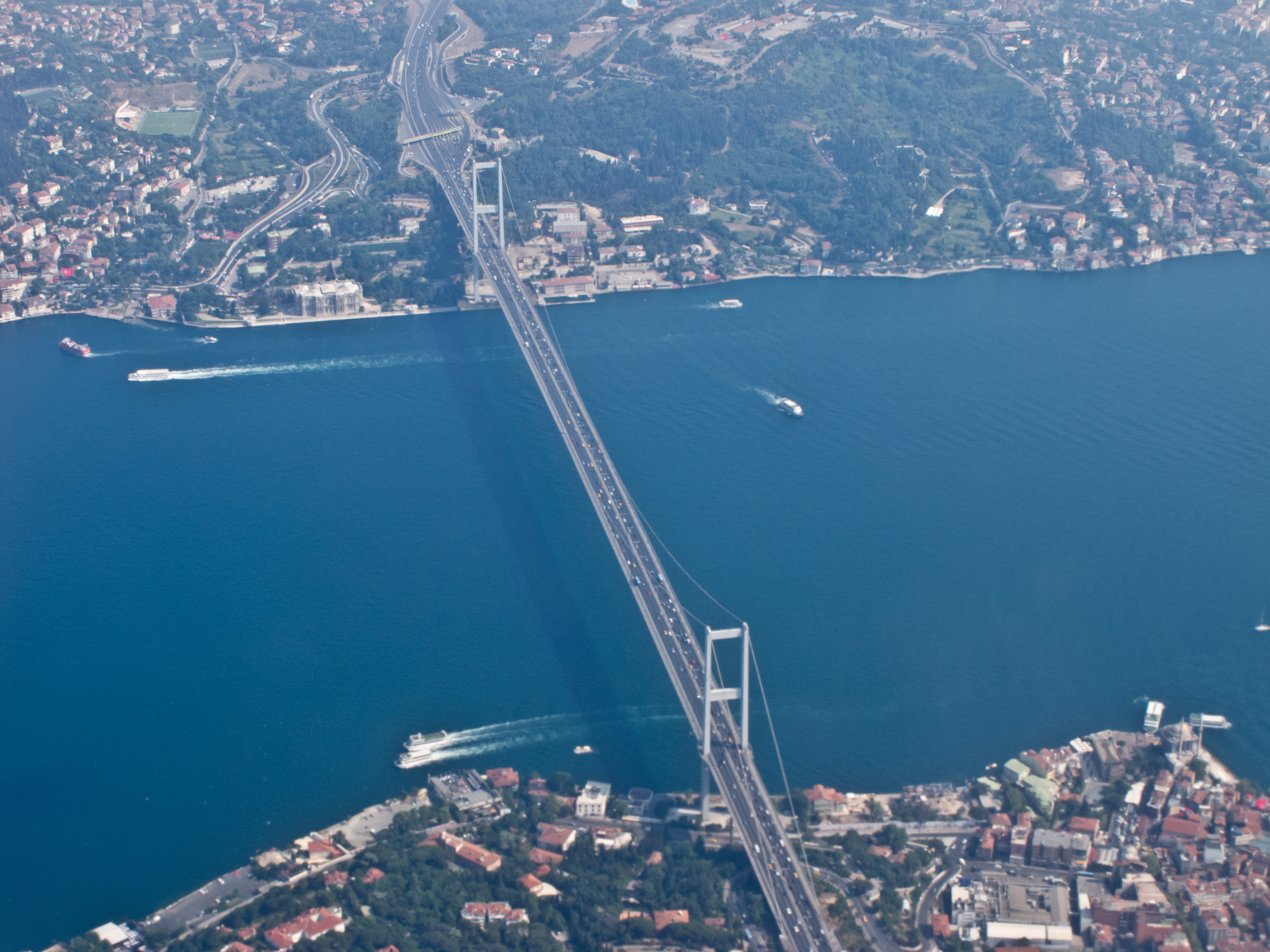
Aerial view of the bridge

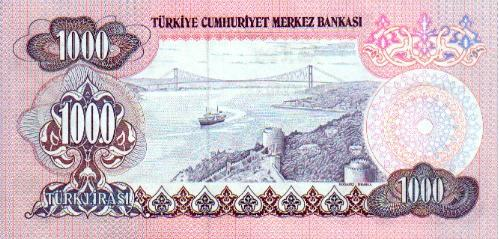
The bridge on the reverse of the 1000 lira banknote (1978–1986)

== See also ==
- Çanakkale 1915 Bridge
- Eurasia Tunnel, undersea tunnel, crossing the Bosphorus for vehicular traffic, opened in December 2016
- Fatih Sultan Mehmet Bridge
- Great Istanbul Tunnel, a proposed three-level road-rail undersea tunnel
- Marmaray, undersea rail tunnel connecting the Asian and European sides of Istanbul
- Osman Gazi Bridge
- Public transport in Istanbul
- Rail transport in Turkey
- Turkish Straits
- Yavuz Sultan Selim Bridge
