= General Directorate of Highways (Turkey) =

Turkish state agency in charge of public roads

General Directorate Of Highways
- Karayolları Genel Müdürlüğü

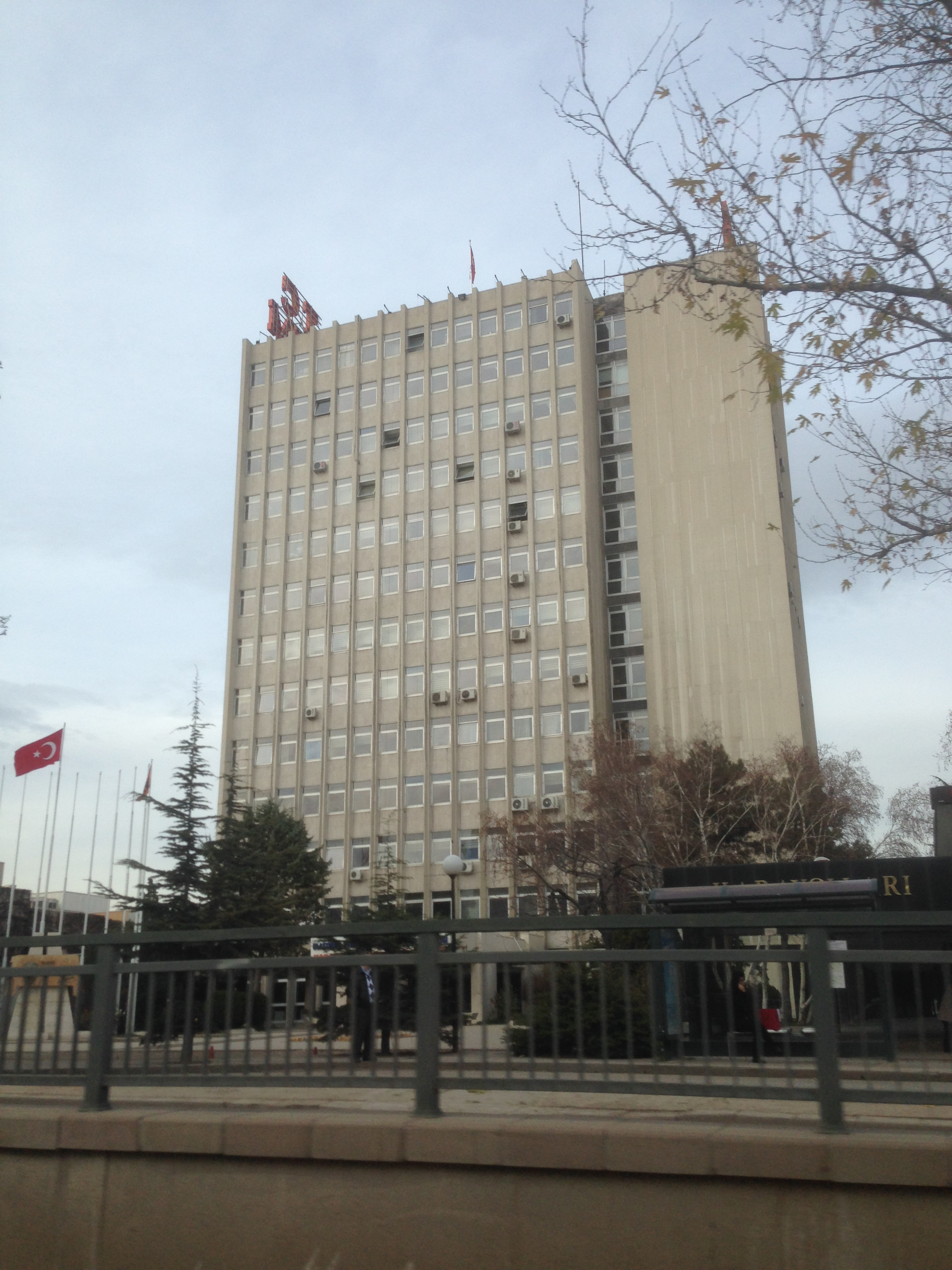
- KGM headquarters in Ankara

Agency overview
- Formed: March 1, 1950; 76 years ago
- Jurisdiction: Ministry of Transport and Infrastructure
- Headquarters: Ankara, Turkey; 39.91690°N 32.84137°E
- Employees: 27.175 (2021)
- Annual budget: 21 Billion ₺
- Agency executive: Ahmet Gülşen, Director-General
- Website: www.kgm.gov.tr/Sayfalar/KGM/SiteEng/Root/MainPageEnglish.aspx

The General Directorate Of Highways (Turkish: Karayolları Genel Müdürlüğü or KGM) is a state agency responsible for the construction and maintenance of all public roadways outside of cities and towns in Turkey. It was established on 1 March 1950, following the enactment of the International Highways Act in 1949. The agency operates as a subsidiary of the Ministry of Transport and Infrastructure.

With its 18 regional divisions across the country, the agency maintains a road network totaling 68,633 km, comprising 3,523 km (2,189 mi) of motorways (Turkish: Otoyol, prefixed by "O"), 30,974 km (19,246 mi) of state highways (Turkish: Devlet yolu, prefixed by "D"), and 34,136 km (21,211 mi) of provincial roads (Turkish: İl yolu, prefixed by the two-digit province code). This network includes related infrastructure such as bridges, viaducts, and tunnels.

The General Directorate of Highways (GDH) manages the toll plazas on toll roads and toll bridges, utilizing automated toll collection systems, including transponder-based OGS and RFID-based HGS.

== Divisions ==
- 1st — Istanbul Province, Northern Marmara Region
- 2nd — Izmir Province, Aegean Region
- 3rd — Konya Province, Aksaray, Afyonkarahisar, Ardahan
- 4th — Ankara Province, Kırıkkale, Eskişehir, Bolu, Düzce
- 5th — Mersin Province, Adana, Kahramanmaraş, Hatay, Osmaniye, Kilis
- 6th — Kayseri Province, Cappadocia, Yozgat, Kırşehir
- 7th — Samsun Province, Middle Black Sea Region
- 8th — Elazığ Province, Adıyaman, Bingöl, Malatya, Tunceli
- 9th — Diyarbakır Province, Southeastern Anatolia Region
- 10th — Trabzon Province, East Black Sea Region
- 11th — Van Province, Muş, Bitlis, Southern Ağrı
- 12th — Erzurum Province, Ağrı
- 13th — Antalya Province, Burdur, Isparta, eastern part of Muğla and southern part of Afyonkarahisar
- 14th — Bursa Province, Southern Marmara Region, Kütahya
- 15th — Kastamonu Province, West Black Sea Region
- 16th — Sivas Province, Erzincan
- 17th — Motorways in Istanbul, including Bosphorus Bridges
- 18th — Kars Province, with former districts Ardahan and Iğdır, formerly part of 12th

== See also ==
- Turkish State Railways
- TCDD Taşımacılık
- Turkish Airlines
- Transport in Turkey
- Turkish State Highway System
- High-speed rail in Turkey
- Rail transport in Turkey
- Otoyol
