= Rákóczi Museum, Tekirdağ =

Rákóczi Museum
- Rakoçi Müzesi
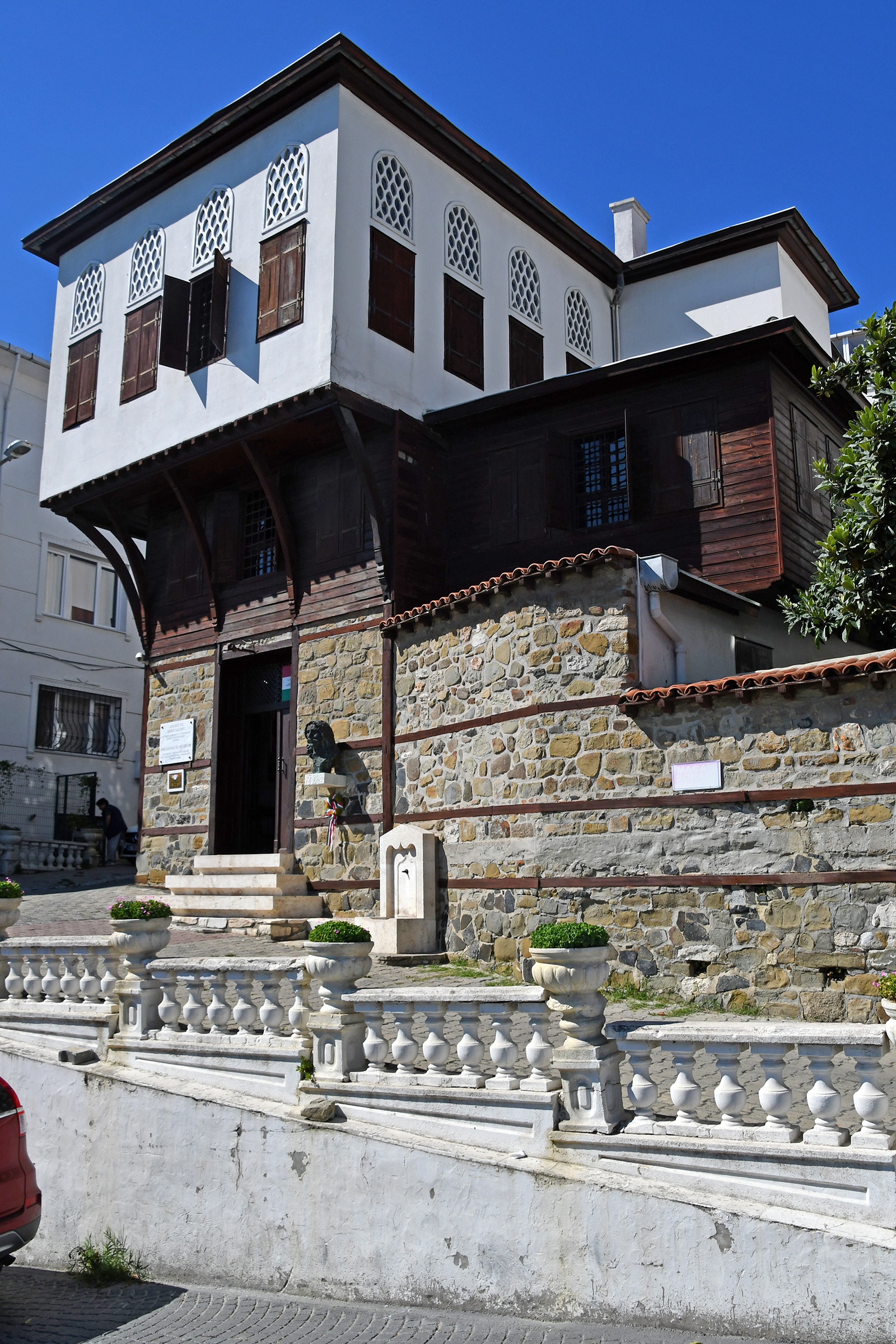
- Rákóczi Museum in Tekirdağ, Turkey.

- Location of Rákóczi Museum
- Established: September 25, 1982
- Location: Tekirdağ, Turkey
- Coordinates: 40.97407°N 27.50995°E
- Type: House museum
- Visitors: 6,500, among them 3,500 Magyars (2007)
- Director: Ali Kabul
- Website: www.rakoczimuzesi.com

The Rákóczi Museum (Turkish: Rakoçi Müzesi) also known as Rákóczi House (Rakoçi Evi), is a historic house museum in Tekirdağ, northwestern Turkey, which is a rebuilt 18th-century house devoted to the life and times of the Hungarian national hero, Francis II Rákóczi, who lived in this house in exile during his last years between 1720 and 1735. The house was transformed in 1982 into a museum after it was donated to the Hungarian State. Since then, it has become a place of national pilgrimage for Hungarians.

== History ==
Ferenc (Francis) II Rákóczi (1676–1735) was a Hungarian noble, the wealthiest landlord in the Kingdom of Hungary, and Prince of Transylvania, who led the first uprising between 1703 and 1711 against Austrian repression of the Habsburg monarchy. After having failed, he was forced into exile. He lived some years in Poland, then tried to find asylum in Britain and later in France without success. Rákóczi and his entourage finally landed in Gallipoli, Ottoman Empire in 1717 accepting an offer by Sultan Ahmet III (reigned 1703–1730), who sent a sailing ship to pick up them. After living in Edirne and Istanbul, he settled then in 1720 in Tekirdağ (Hungarian: Rodostó) moving into a house, which was assigned to him and where he lived until his death on April 8, 1735.

His followers, among them essayist Kelemen Mikes and many aristocrats, settled also in neighbouring streets of his house, making up a large Hungarian colony in Tekirdağ.

The remains of Rákóczi were transferred in 1906 from Istanbul to Kassa in Hungary (today Košice in Slovakia) together with his personal belongings from the house.

== Museum ==
The building is an 18th-century wooden house in typical Ottoman architectural style having ten rooms on three levels. It is situated on a small hill overlooking the Sea of Marmara. Before the construction of the coastal highway (D.110 / E84) in modern times, the house was closer to the sea.

The building was donated to the State of Hungary in the early 1980s, and was rebuilt after illustrations of the interior made by a Hungarian artist in 1906 as he travelled to Tekirdağ. The items on display are reproductions made precisely after their originals. Only a few items in the museum's inventory are original. The museum was officially opened to public on September 25, 1982. The museum, regarded as a cultural bridge between Turkey and Hungary, was restored again by the Hungarian government and re-opened in 2010.

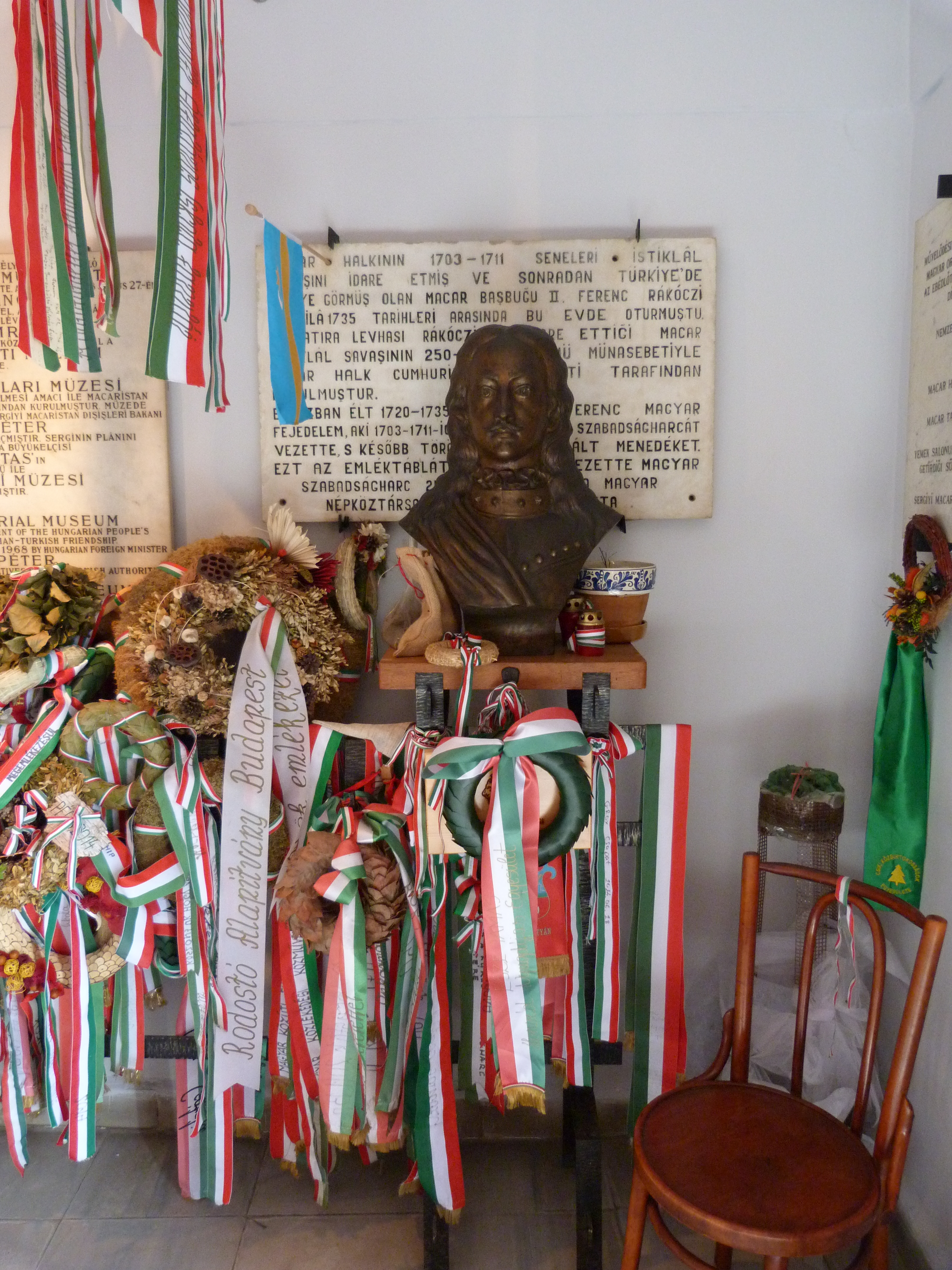
Bronze bust of Francis II Rákóczi.

There is a bronze bust of Rákóczi on the ground floor and of his chamberlain Kelemen Mikes at the basement. Oil painted portraits of Rákóczi's mother Ilona Zrínyi, his stepfather Imre Thököly and his aides decorate the walls. A banner with his family's coat of arms is also on exhibit. In the building, a kitchen, a pantry, an oriental toilet and a water well can be seen.

In the first floor, porcelain and ceramic items from Hungary, a wallet made of silver thread belonging to Rákóczi's mother are on display. Watercolors by the Hungarian painter Aladár Edivi Illés (1870–1958) showing old Tekirdağ landscape hang on the walls at this floor.

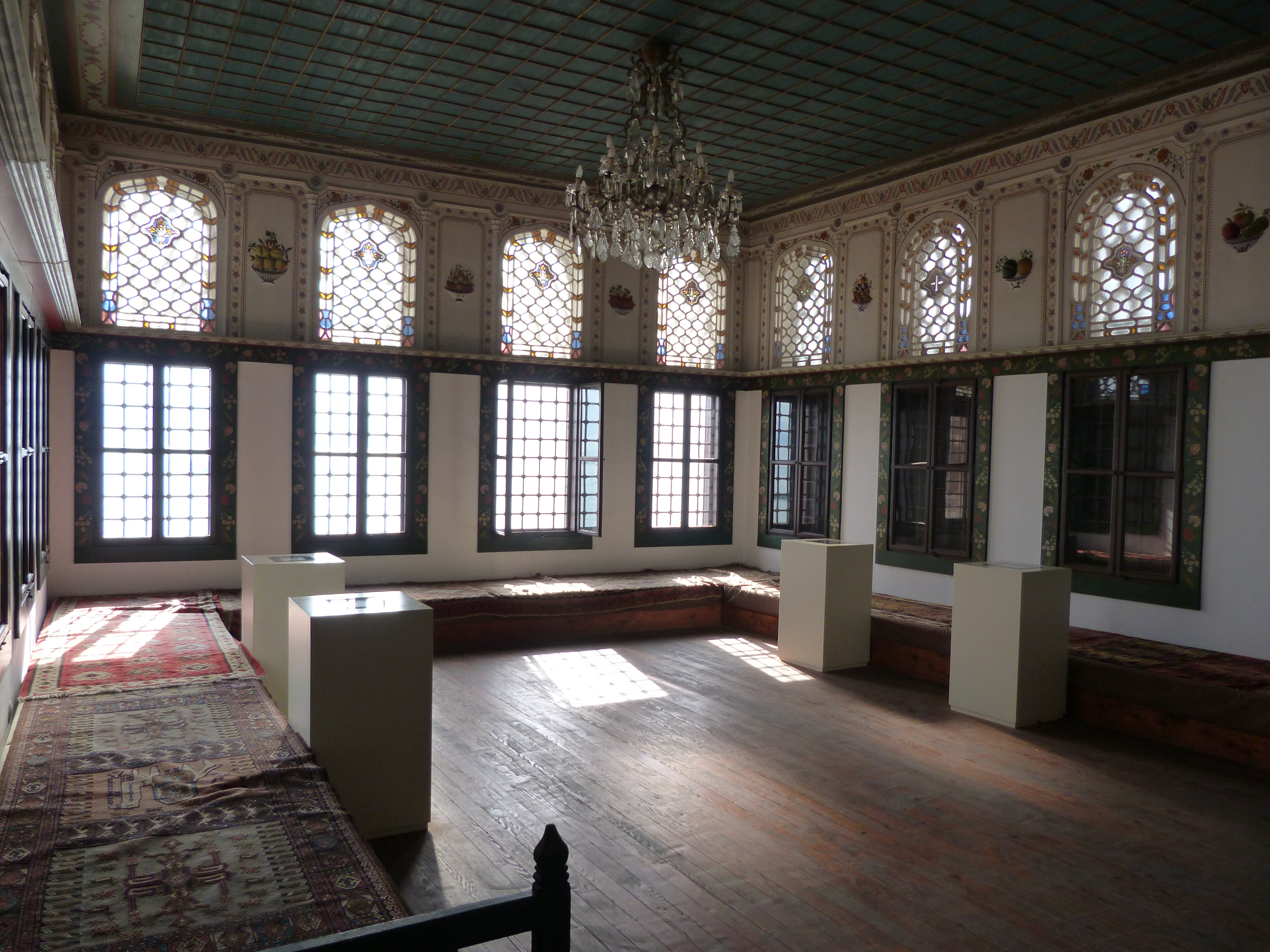
Reception room.

The finest room of the house is the reception room situated on the second floor. It is designed after a room, the prince had seen during his stay in Edirne and had liked much. The wooden ceiling is carved with ornaments of flowers and fruits. The windows of the room are of stained glass. The walls are painted with Hungarian folk motifs. A wooden chair made and decoratively carved by Rákóczi himself can be seen also in this room. The office of Kelemen Mikes is also on this floor. He wrote his Letters from Turkey in this room. His work, a collection of letters written to a fictional aunt describing the daily life of Rákóczi in a lovely way, was translated into Turkish and published by the Governor of Tekirdağ.

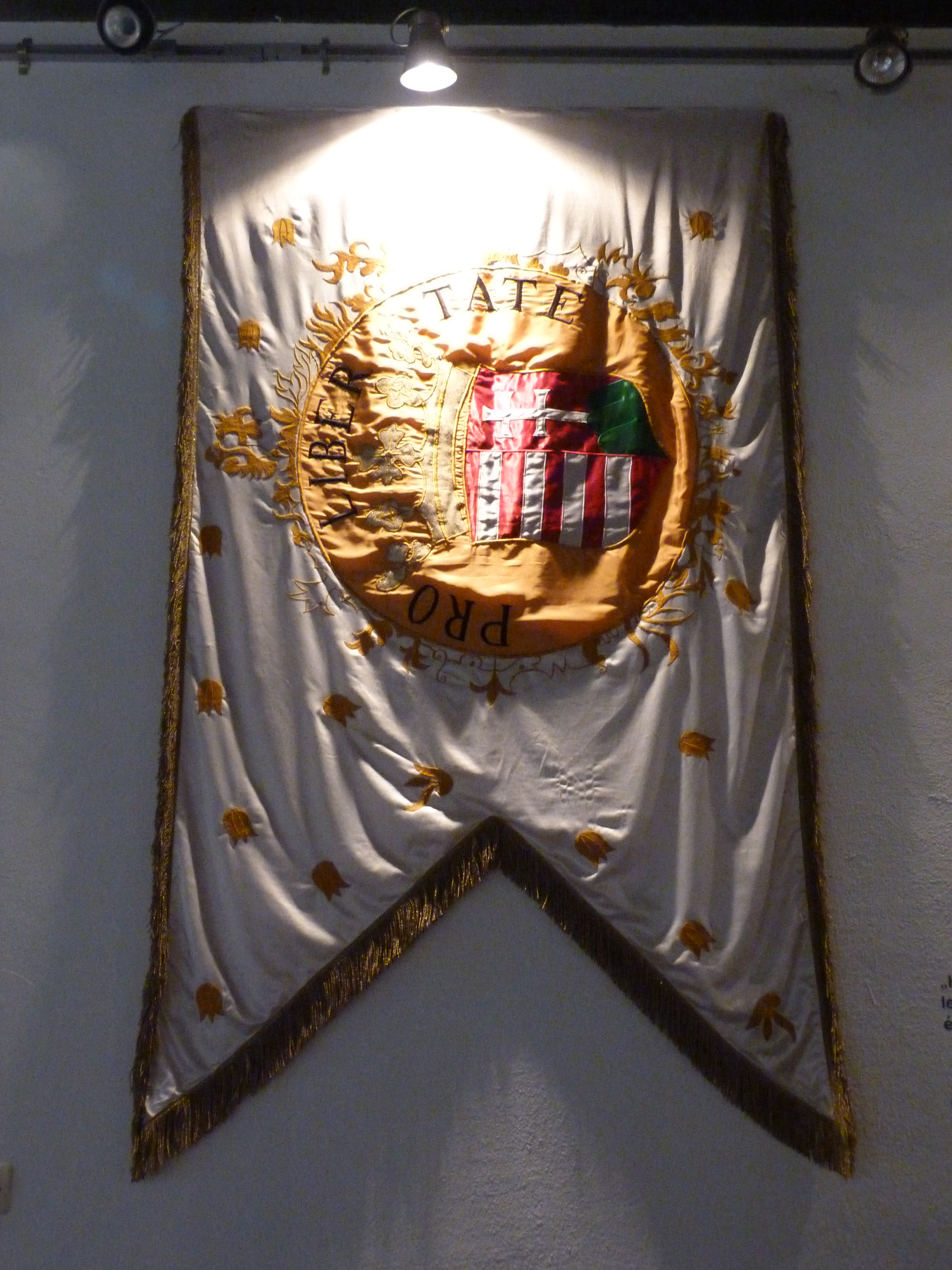
Historical banner with coat of arms.

In the museum, a banner and examples of the weapons used by the kuruc army are on exhibit.

In front of the house museum, a wooden gate carved in traditional Szekely style was erected in 2005. Tekirdağ hosts also a fountain built in memorial of Rákóczi.

In 2007, the Rákóczi Museum was visited by 6,500 people, 3,500 of them being Hungarians only. It is open everyday except on Mondays.

== Replica of the house ==
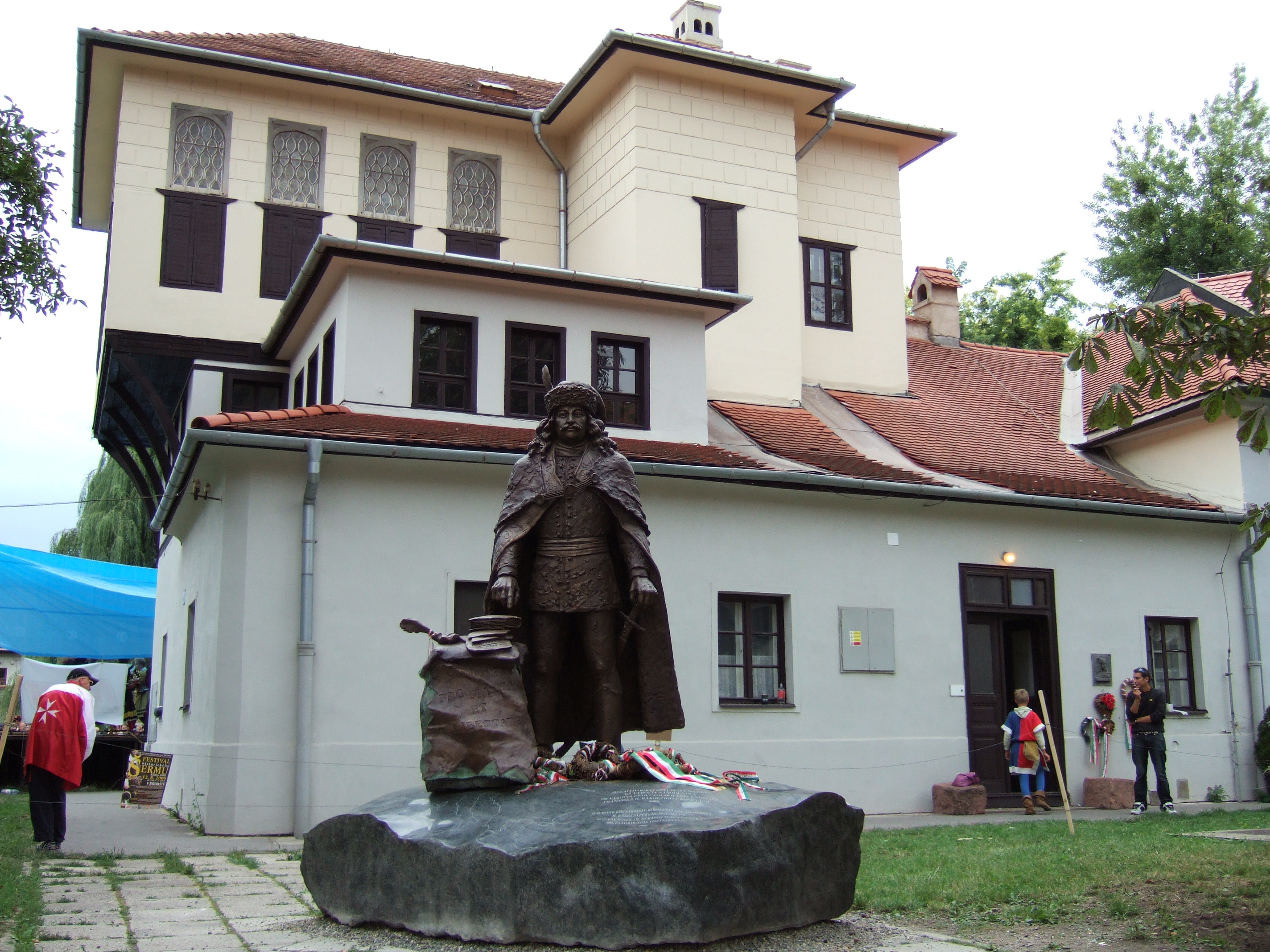
Rákóczi memorial house in Košice, Slovakia (a replica)

There is a Rákóczi memorial house in Košice, Slovakia, which is a replica of the building in Tekirdağ.
