= Tekirdağ Museum of Archaeology and Ethnography =

- Tekirdağ Arkeoloji ve Etnografya Müzesi
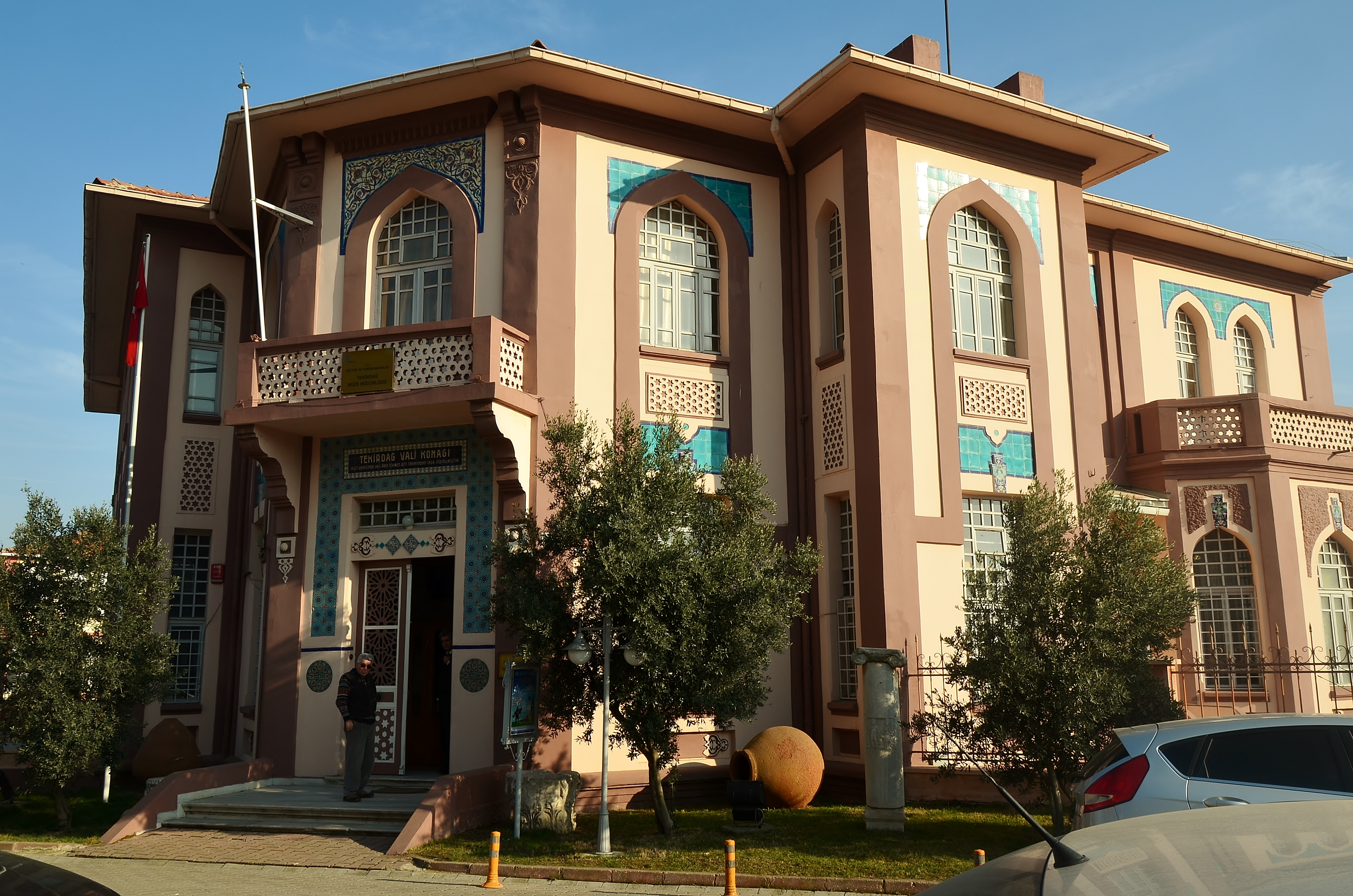
- Building of Tekirdağ Museum of Archaeology and Ethnography.

- Location of Tekirdağ Museum in Turkey
- Established: 1967; 59 years ago
- Location: Valikonağı Cad. 21, Tekirdağ
- Coordinates: 40°58′32.5″N 27°30′45″E
- Type: Archaeology museum, Ethnographic museum

Tekirdağ Museum of Archaeology and Ethnography (Turkish: Tekirdağ Arkeoloji ve Etnografya Müzesi), shortly Tekirdağ Museum, is a national museum in Tekirdağ, Turkey, exhibiting archaeological artifacts found in and around the province, as well as ethnographical items related to the region's cultural history.

Established in 1967, the museum was housed in a small building belonging to the Physical Education Administration. In 1976, the mansion of the Tekirdağ Province Governor (Turkish: Valikonağı) was assigned to the Ministry of Culture and Tourism for use as a museum. Tekirdağ Museum was opened to the public, in this building, on December 28, 1992.

The museum building has two main stories, in addition to a basement, a loft and a garden. Exhibitions are on display in a hall on the ground floor, in the loft and in the garden with five-level terraces. Archaeological finds from the Early Bronze Age (3000-2500 BCE), Late Bronze Age (2000-1200 BCE) and Early Iron Age (1400-1000 BCE), as well as from the Hellenistic, Ancient Roman, Byzantine and Ottoman periods are on display. The ethnographical section exhibits items used by the residents of the region during the Ottoman times and later, to give an example of their historic lifestyle.
