= Tekkebak Tunnel =

Road tunnel in Turkey

Tekkebak Tunnel Tekkebak Tüneli
- Interactive map of Tekkebak Tunnel; Tekkebak Tüneli

Overview
- Location: Fatsa, Ordu Province
- Coordinates: 40°59′44″N 37°39′05″E Location of Tekkebak Tunnel in Turkey
- Status: Operational
- Route: D.010 E70

Operation
- Work began: 1997
- Constructed: Nurol-Tekfen-Yüksel joint venture
- Opened: 7 April 2007; 19 years ago
- Operator: General Directorate of Highways
- Traffic: automotive

Technical
- Length: 170 and 135 m (558 and 443 ft)
- No. of lanes: 2 x 2
- Operating speed: 80 km/h (50 mph)

Tekkebak Tunnel (Turkish: Tekkebak Tüneli), is a highway tunnel constructed in Ordu Province, northern Turkey.

Tekkebak Tunnel is part of the Samsun-Ordu Highway D.010 E70 within the Black Sea Coastal Highway, of which construction was carried out by the Turkish Nurol-Tekfen-Yüksel joint venture. The 170 and 135 m (558 and 443 ft)-long twin-tube tunnel carrying two lanes of traffic in each direction is flanked by 261–257 m (856–843 ft)-long Kozbükü Tunnel in the west and 3,805–3,825 m (12,484–12,549 ft)-long Ordu Nefise Akçelik Tunnel (named in honour of the late female engineer Nefise Akçelik) in the east on the same highway.

The tunnel was opened to traffic on 7 April 2007 by Turkish Prime Minister Recep Tayyip Erdoğan. Dangerous goods carriers are not permitted to use the tunnel.
