= Kadıoğlu Tunnel =

Highway tunnel in Ordu Province, Northern Turkey

Kadıoğlu Tunnel Kadıoğlu Tüneli
- Interactive map of Kadıoğlu Tunnel; Kadıoğlu Tüneli

Overview
- Location: Fatsa, Ordu Province
- Coordinates: 40°59′45″N 37°38′14″E Location of Kadıoğlu Tunnel in Turkey
- Status: Operational
- Route: D.010 E70

Operation
- Work began: 1997
- Constructed: Nurol-Tekfen-Yüksel joint venture
- Opened: 7 April 2007; 19 years ago
- Operator: General Directorate of Highways
- Traffic: automotive

Technical
- Length: 116 and 150 m (381 and 492 ft)
- No. of lanes: 2 x 2
- Operating speed: 80 km/h (50 mph)

Kadıoğlu Tunnel (Turkish: Kadıoğlu Tüneli), is a highway tunnel constructed in Ordu Province, northern Turkey.

Kadıoğlu Tunnel is part of the Samsun-Ordu Highway D.010 E70 within the Black Sea Coastal Highway, of which construction was carried out by the Turkish Nurol-Tekfen-Yüksel joint venture. The 116 and 150 m (381 and 492 ft)-long twin-tube tunnel carrying two lanes of traffic in each direction. The Kozbükü Tunnel follows the Kadıoğlu Tunnel in direction Ordu.

The tunnel was opened to traffic on 7 April 2007 by Turkish Prime Minister Recep Tayyip Erdoğan. Dangerous goods carriers are not permitted to use the tunnel.
