= Tekirdağ =

City in Turkey

- City
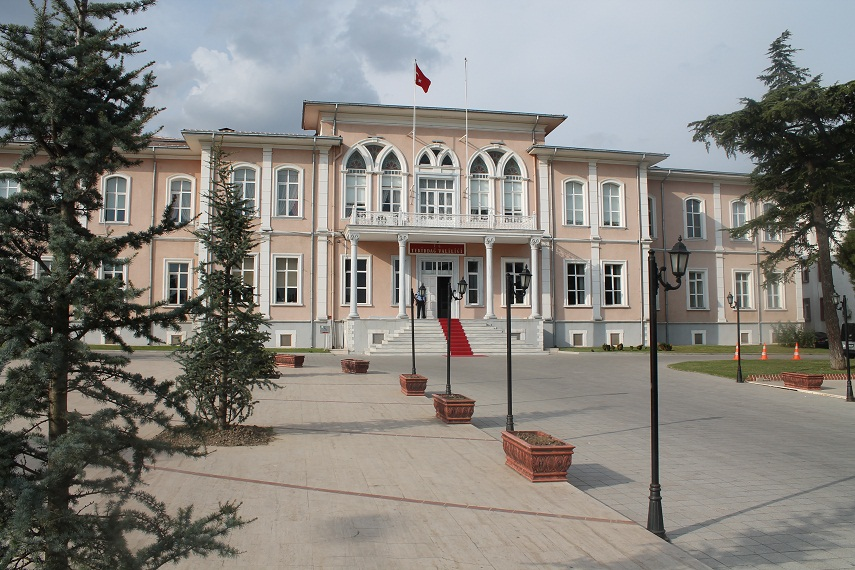
- Tekirdağ Governorship

- Emblem of Tekirdağ Metropolitan Municipality

- Location in Turkey Location in Turkey's Marmara Region Tekirdağ (Europe) Tekirdağ (Balkans)
- Coordinates: 40°58′40″N 27°30′55″E
- Country: Turkey
- Province: Tekirdağ

Government
  - Mayor: Candan Yüceer (CHP)
- Elevation: 37 m (121 ft)

Population (2022)
  - Urban: 186,421
- Time zone: UTC+3 (TRT)
- Postal code: 59xxx
- Website: www.tekirdag.bel.tr

Tekirdağ (pronounced [teˈciɾdaː]) known historically as Rhaedestus (Greek: Ῥαιδεστός), is a city in northwestern Turkey. It is the seat of Tekirdağ Province and Süleymanpaşa District. It is located on the north coast of the Sea of Marmara, in the region of East Thrace. The city forms the urban part of the Süleymanpaşa district, with a population of 186,421 in 2022.

Tekirdağ is a commercial centre with a harbour for agricultural products (the harbour is being expanded to accommodate a new rail link to the main freight line through Thrace). It is also home to Martas and the BOTAŞ Terminal, both of them important for trade activities in the Marmara Region. The town's best known product remains Tekirdağ rakı, although it is also known for its cherries which are celebrated with a festival every June.

The proximity of the Greek and Bulgarian borders means that there are honorary consulates for both countries in Tekirdağ.

Ferries from Tekirdağ sail to the nearby Marmara Islands during the summer.

The nearest airport is Tekirdağ Çorlu Airport (TEQ) although there are many more flights to Istanbul Airport (IST).

== Names and etymology ==
Tekirdağ was called Bisanthe or Bysanthe (Greek: Βισάνθη/Βυσάνθη), and also Rhaedestus (Ῥαιδεστός) in classical antiquity. The latter name was used until the Byzantine era, and transformed into Rodosçuk after it fell to the Ottomans in the 14th century (in western languages it is usually rendered as Rodosto). After the 18th century it was called Tekfurdağı, based on the Turkish word tekfur, meaning "Byzantine lord", and dağ meaning mountain. In time, the name mutated into the Turkish Tekirdağ, and this became the official name under the Turkish Republic. The historical name "Rhaedestos" (transcribed also as Raidestos) is still used in the Greek Orthodox ecclesiastical context (e.g. the Bishop of Raidestos, the Metropolitanate of Heraclia and Raidestos).

== History ==
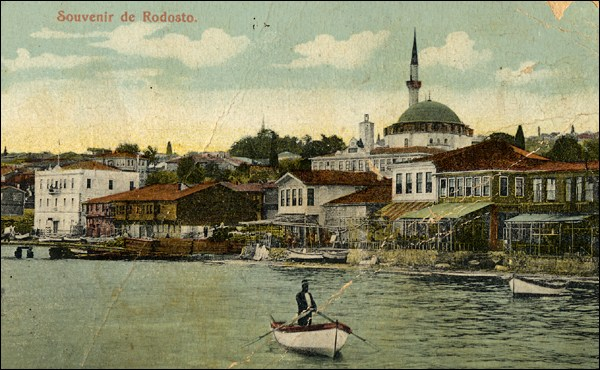
A postcard showing Rodosto (Tekirdağ) in the late 19th/early 20th centuries

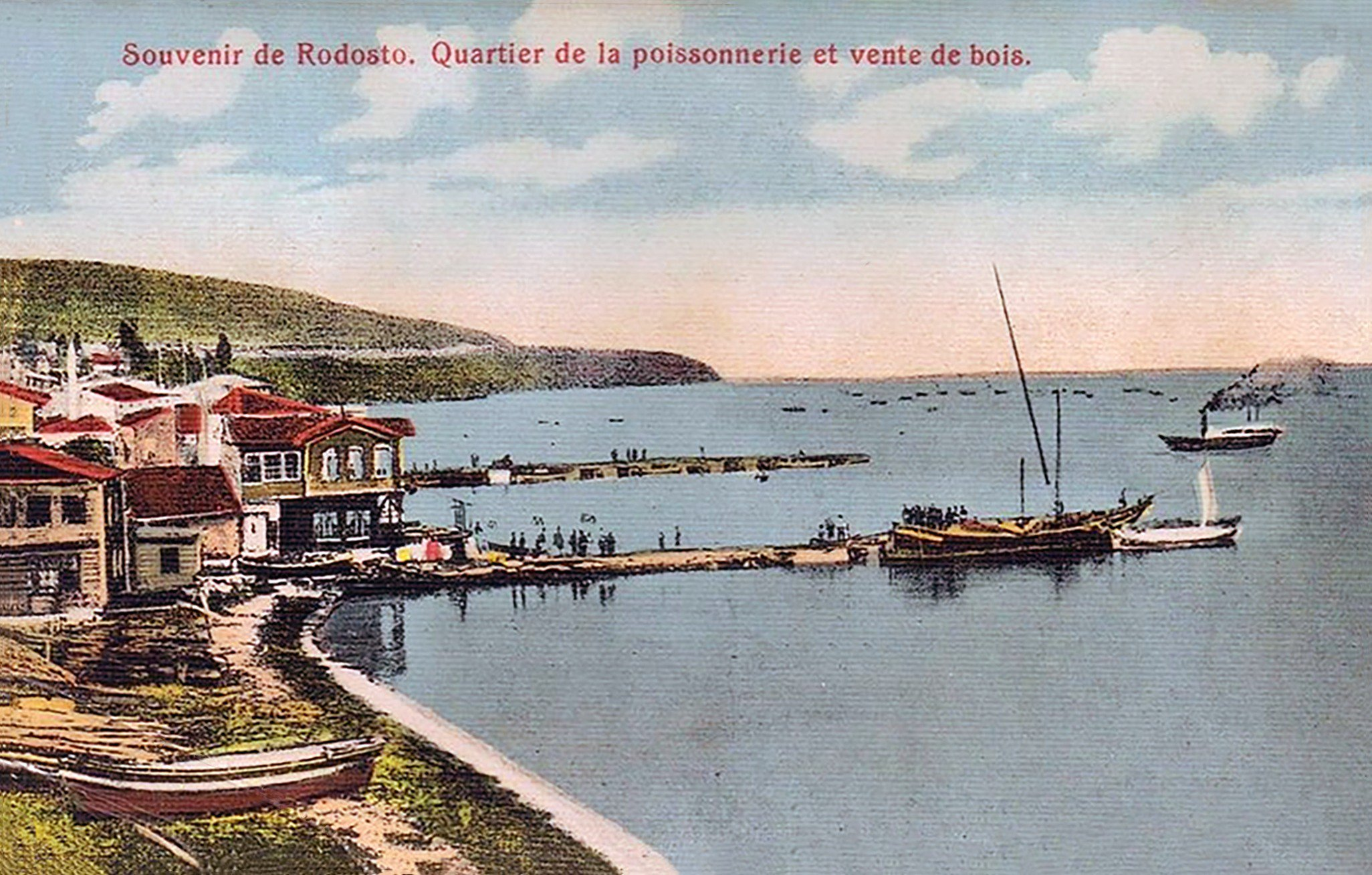
Picture of the port of Tekirdağ on a postcard, 1900s

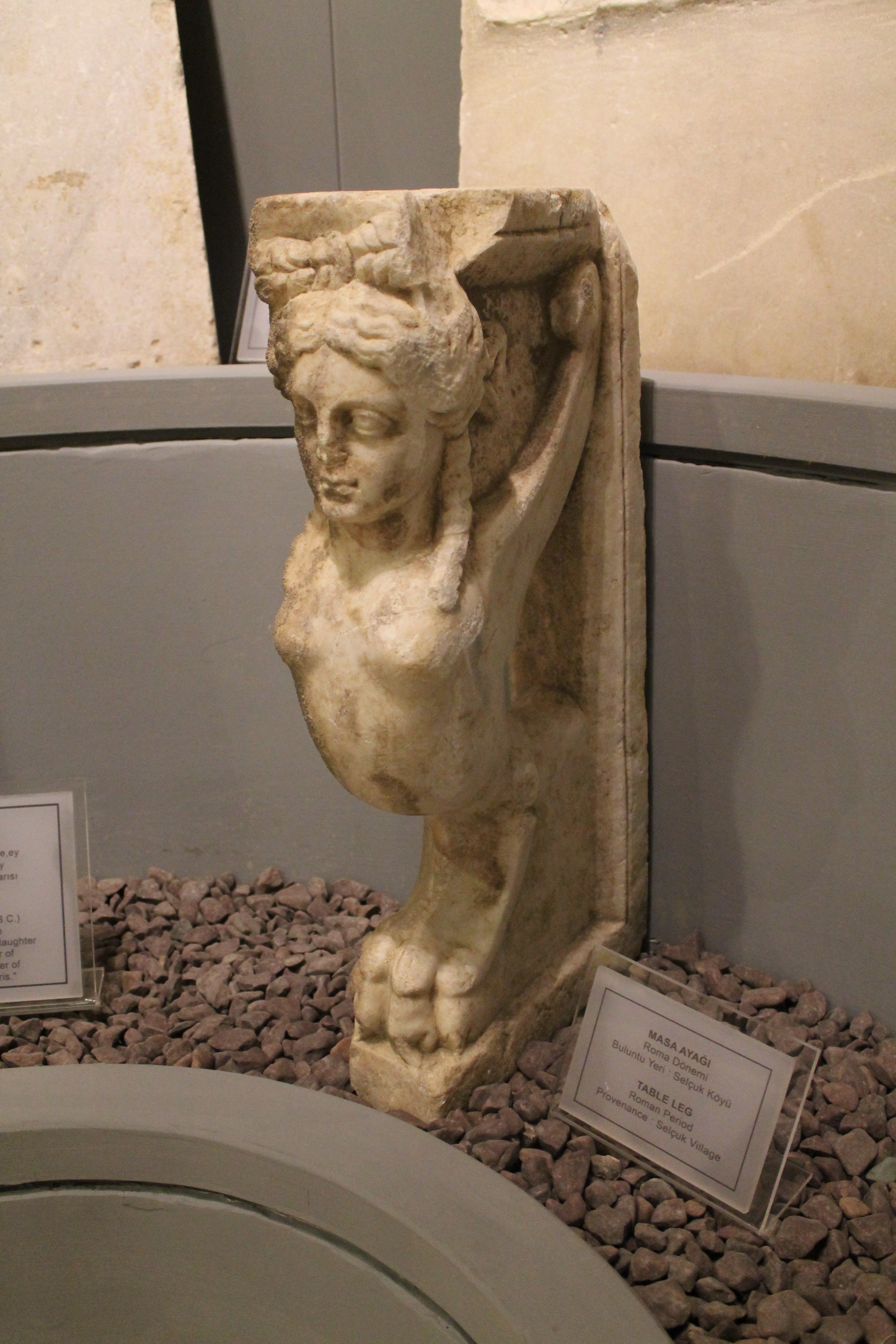
Sphinx table leg, Roman period in Tekirdağ Museum of Archaeology and Ethnography

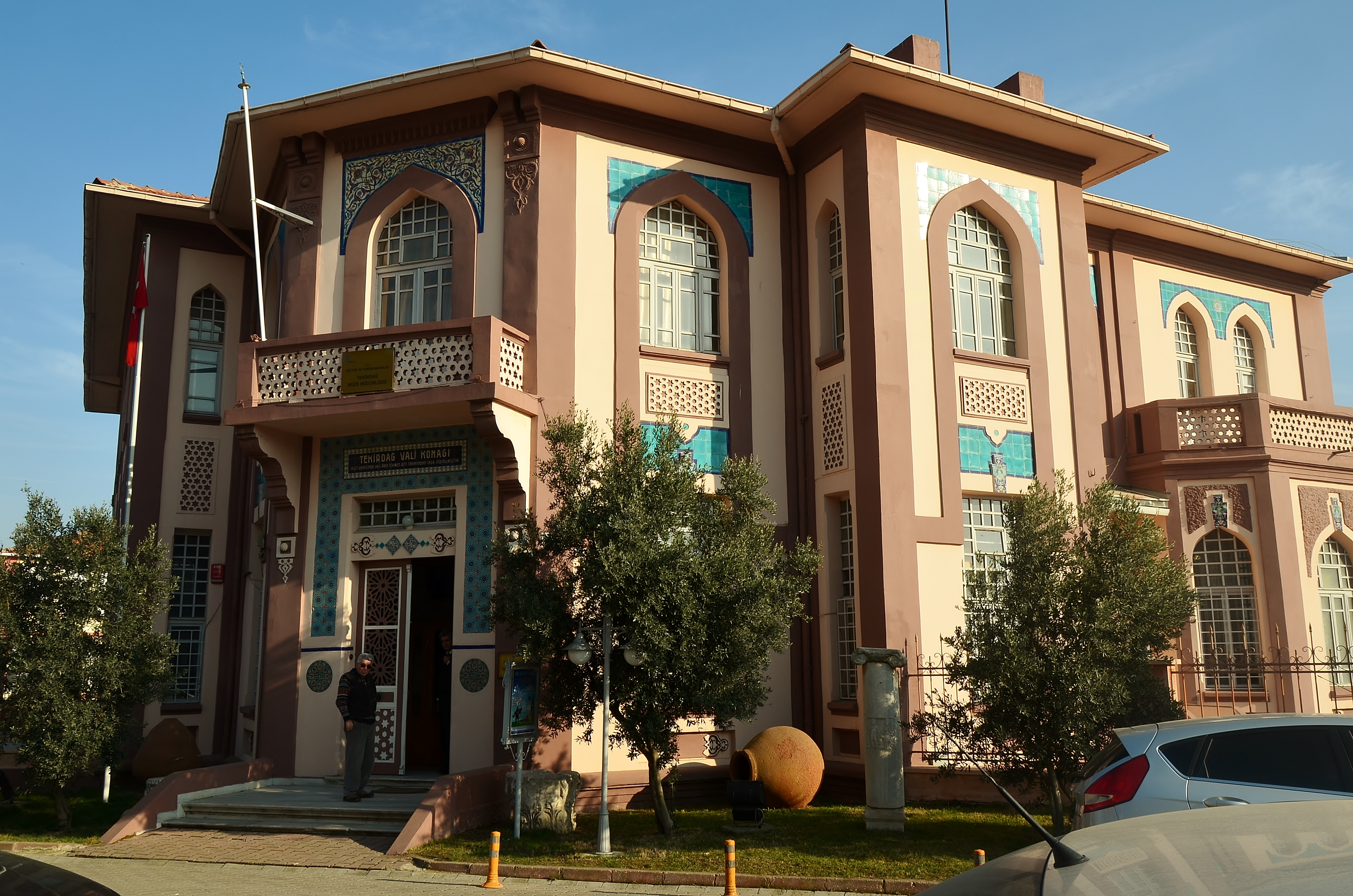
Tekirdağ Museum of Archaeology and Ethnography

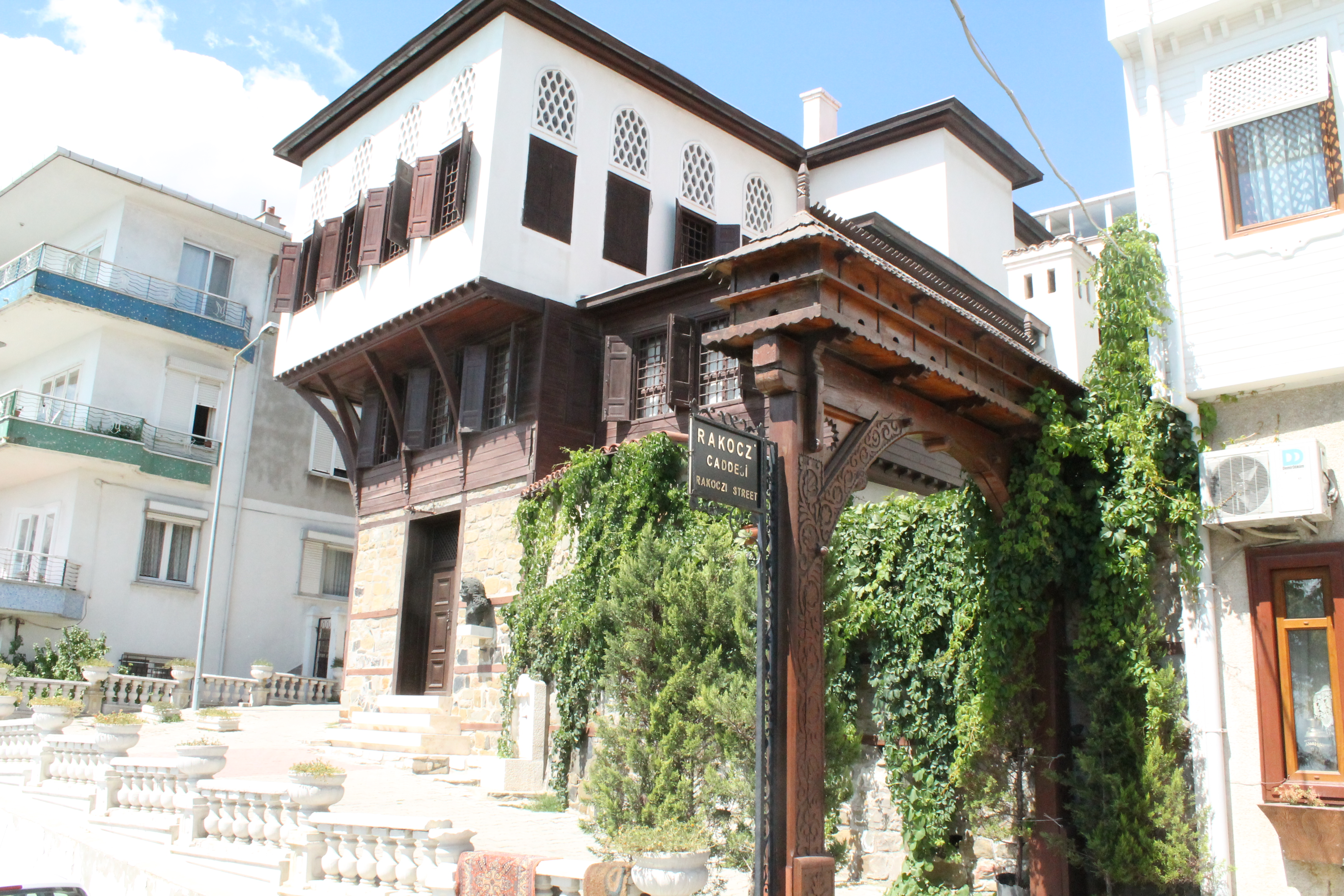
The memorial house of Francis II Rákóczi in Tekirdağ

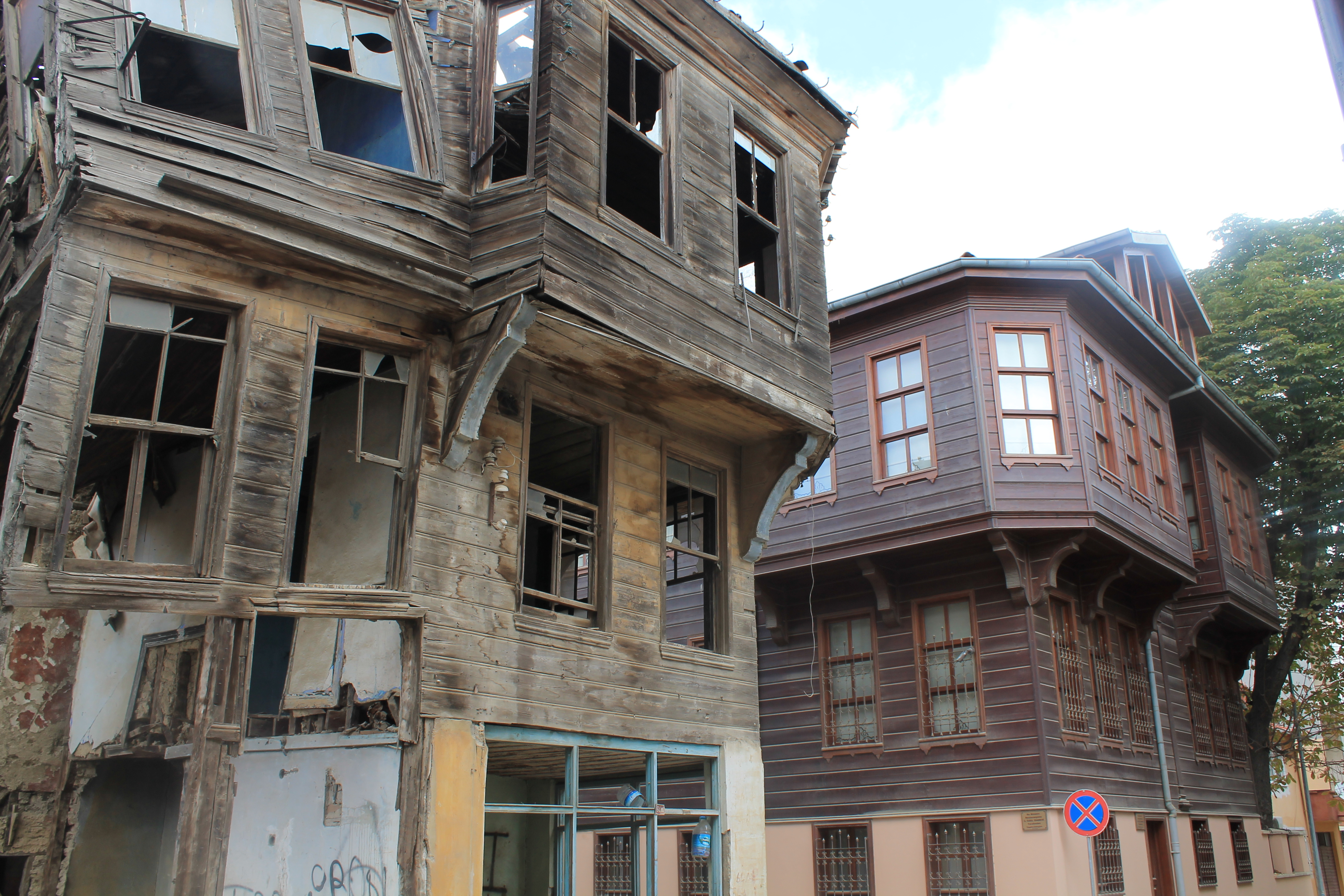
Historic Ottoman wooden houses.

The history of the city of Tekirdağ dates back to around 4000 BC. In Xenophon's Anabasis it is mentioned as part of the kingdom of the Thracian king Seuthes. It is also mentioned as Bisanthe by Herodotus (VII, 137). The city was a Samian colony.

Procopius chronicled the town's restoration by Justinian I in the 6th century AD. In 813 and again in 1206, after the Battle of Rodosto, it was sacked by the Bulgarians, but it continued to appear as a place of considerable importance in later Byzantine times. The 11th-century Byzantine historian Michael Attaleiates owned property in Raidestos which he described in his will. From 1204 to 1235 the town was ruled by the Venetians following the Latin occupation of Constantinople during the Fourth Crusade.

In the Ottoman period the city was successively a part of the Rumelia Eyalet, then of the Province of the Kapudan Pasha, the Silistra Eyalet, and Edirne Vilayet. After 1849, it became the seat of the Sanjak of Tekfürtaği.

=== Twentieth century ===
Tekirdağ was occupied twice by the Russian army: firstly, on 22 August 1829 during the Russo-Turkish War (1828–1829) and then on 1 February 1878 during the Russo-Turkish War (1877–1878). After these wars, the city returned to Ottoman rule.

In 1905, the city had a population of about 35,000, of whom about half were Greeks.

Tekirdağ was occupied by the Bulgarian army on 11 November 1912. The city was liberated on 13 July 1913.

Finally, Tekirdağ was occupied by the Greek army on 20 July 1920 during the Turkish War of Independence (1919–1922). After the signing of the Armistice of Mudanya, the city was given back to Turkey on 13 November 1922. Under the terms of the 1923 agreement for the Exchange of Greek Orthodox and Muslim Populations between the two countries, the Greek Christians of Tekirdağ were all forced to leave (founding the village of Nea Raidestos), their place taken by Muslim Turks from Greece.

In December 1934, a convoy of 1,583 Turkish speaking Muslims from Dobruja and Ada Kaleh settled in Tekirdağ.

For many years Tekirdağ served as a depot for the produce of Edirne province. However, its trade suffered badly when Alexandroupolis became the terminus of the railway up the river Maritsa.

=== Bishopric ===
Rhaedestus remains a titular see of the Roman Catholic Church. However, Roman Catholic Church activity has long ceased.

Catholic bishops

- Emmet Michael Walsh 8 September 1949 16 November 1952
- Manuel Alfonso de Carvalho 10 February 1953 17 June 1957
- Wilson Laus Schmidt 5 September 1957 18 May 1962
- Carlos Horacio Ponce de Léon 9 June 1962 28 April 1966

== Location ==
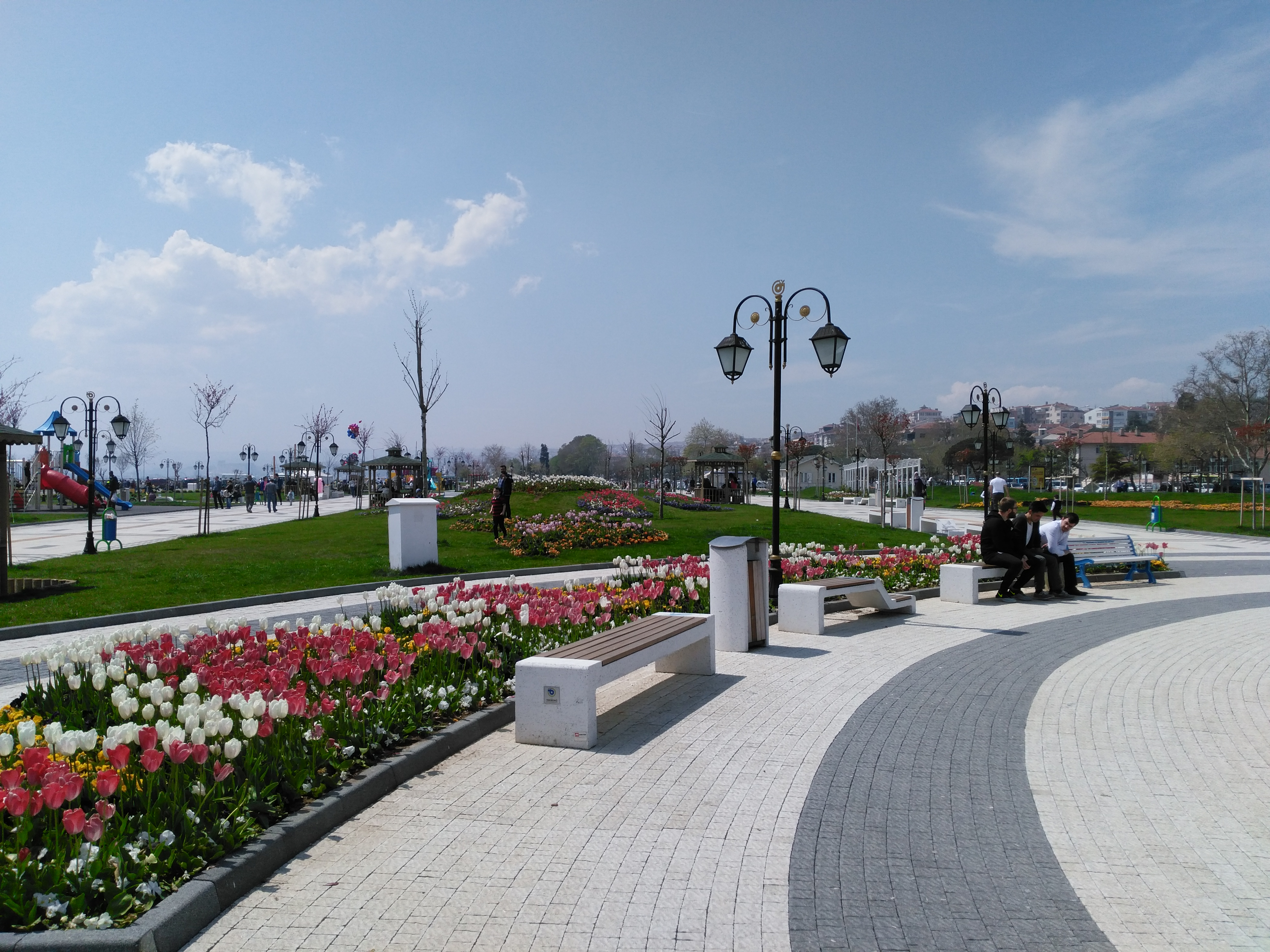
Süleymanpaşa park, Tekirdağ

Tekirdağ is situated on the northern coast of the Sea of Marmara, 135 kilometres (84 miles) west of Istanbul. Its picturesque bay is backed by the promontory of the mountain which gives its name to the city, Tekir Dağı (ancient Combos), a spur of about 2000 ft. that rises into the hilly plateau to the north. Between Tekirdağ and Şarköy is another mountain, Ganos Dağı.

== Climate ==
Tekirdağ has a Mediterranean climate (Köppen: Csa, Trewartha: Cs). Summers are hot and humid whilst winters are cool and wet. Snowfall is somewhat common, with a week or two of snow between the months of December and March.

Highest recorded temperature:40.2 °C (104.4 °F) on 27 June 2007
Lowest recorded temperature:−13.5 °C (7.7 °F) on 3 January 1942

Climate data for Tekirdağ (1991–2020, extremes 1940–2025)
Month	Jan	Feb	Mar	Apr	May	Jun	Jul	Aug	Sep	Oct	Nov	Dec	Year
Record high °C (°F)	23.9 (75.0)	24.7 (76.5)	28.7 (83.7)	34.3 (93.7)	33.8 (92.8)	40.2 (104.4)	38.4 (101.1)	39.4 (102.9)	39.7 (103.5)	35.1 (95.2)	28.2 (82.8)	23.5 (74.3)	40.2 (104.4)
Mean daily maximum °C (°F)	8.6 (47.5)	9.4 (48.9)	12.0 (53.6)	16.1 (61.0)	21.2 (70.2)	26.0 (78.8)	28.7 (83.7)	29.1 (84.4)	25.1 (77.2)	20.0 (68.0)	15.1 (59.2)	10.4 (50.7)	18.5 (65.3)
Daily mean °C (°F)	5.2 (41.4)	5.8 (42.4)	8.1 (46.6)	12.0 (53.6)	17.1 (62.8)	21.8 (71.2)	24.4 (75.9)	24.8 (76.6)	20.7 (69.3)	16.1 (61.0)	11.4 (52.5)	7.1 (44.8)	14.5 (58.1)
Mean daily minimum °C (°F)	2.4 (36.3)	2.8 (37.0)	4.8 (40.6)	8.4 (47.1)	13.1 (55.6)	17.4 (63.3)	19.8 (67.6)	20.5 (68.9)	16.7 (62.1)	12.7 (54.9)	8.2 (46.8)	4.2 (39.6)	10.9 (51.6)
Record low °C (°F)	−13.5 (7.7)	−13.3 (8.1)	−10.4 (13.3)	−1.2 (29.8)	2.7 (36.9)	8.6 (47.5)	10.9 (51.6)	11.0 (51.8)	3.7 (38.7)	−1.8 (28.8)	−7.8 (18.0)	−10.9 (12.4)	−13.5 (7.7)
Average precipitation mm (inches)	58.2 (2.29)	62.7 (2.47)	53.7 (2.11)	40.8 (1.61)	37.8 (1.49)	37.9 (1.49)	28.5 (1.12)	16.4 (0.65)	45.7 (1.80)	81.6 (3.21)	61.2 (2.41)	76.6 (3.02)	601.1 (23.67)
Average precipitation days	10.03	9.9	10.47	9.33	8.37	7.13	3.43	2.4	5.27	8.03	8.37	11.1	93.8
Average snowy days	3.96	3.46	1.42	0	0	0	0	0	0	0	0.25	2.71	11.8
Average relative humidity (%)	83.7	81.7	80.9	78.4	77.0	73.9	70.2	70.8	74.3	81.1	83.1	83.1	78.1
Mean monthly sunshine hours	84.5	97.6	137.9	180.2	231.2	263.1	296.8	269.9	205.6	144.0	99.6	75.2	2,058.4
Mean daily sunshine hours	2.7	3.5	4.4	6.0	7.5	8.8	9.6	8.7	6.9	4.6	3.3	2.5	5.7
Source 1: Turkish State Meteorological Service
Source 2: NOAA (humidity, sun 1991-2020), Meteomanz (snowy days 2000-2023)

== Economy ==
The city has a port area, divided into two main areas, the main city port operated by Ceyport, and the container port, 7.5 km south at Barbaros, operated at Asyaport.

== Tekirdağ today ==
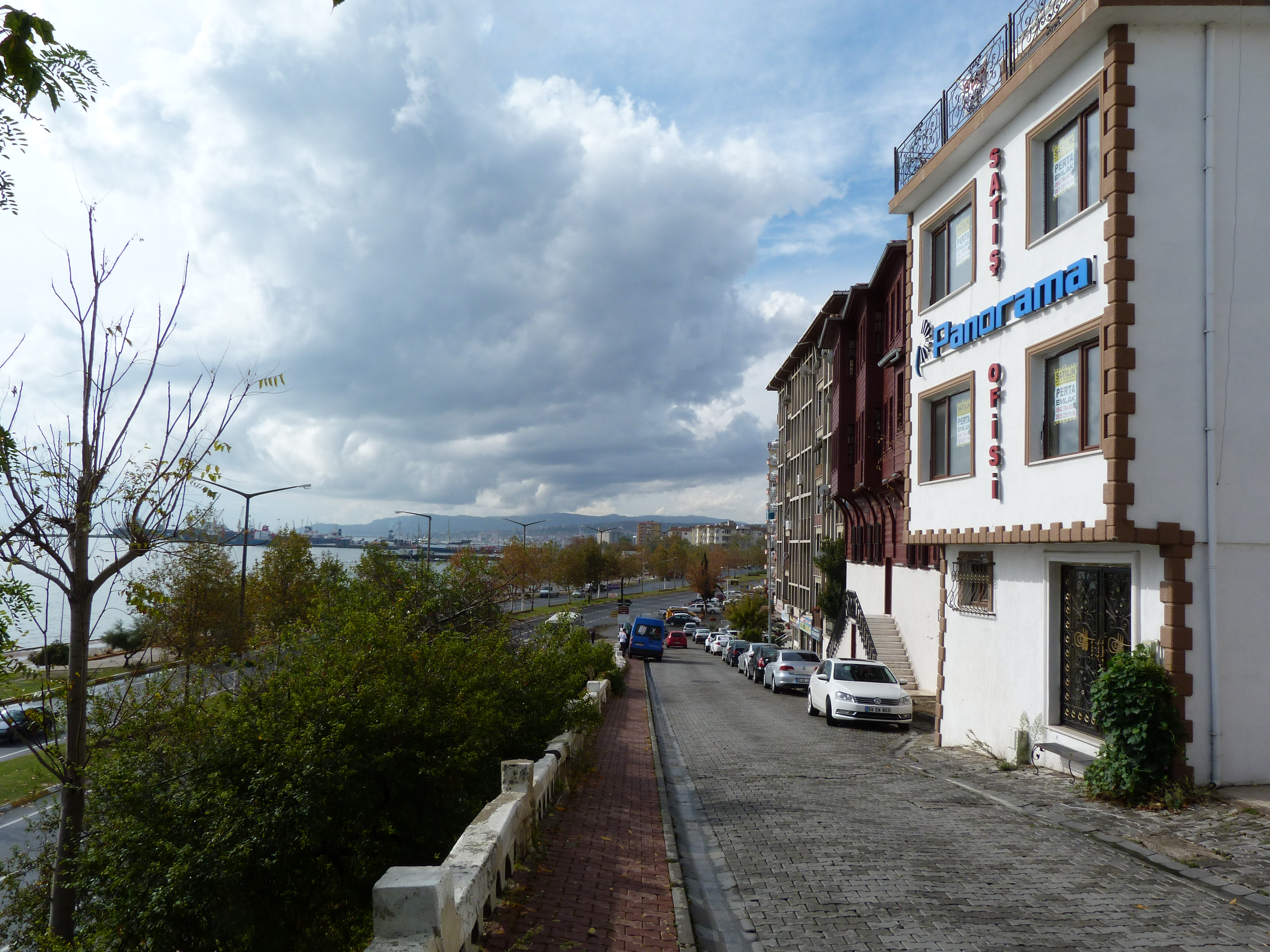
The memorial house of Francis II Rákóczi

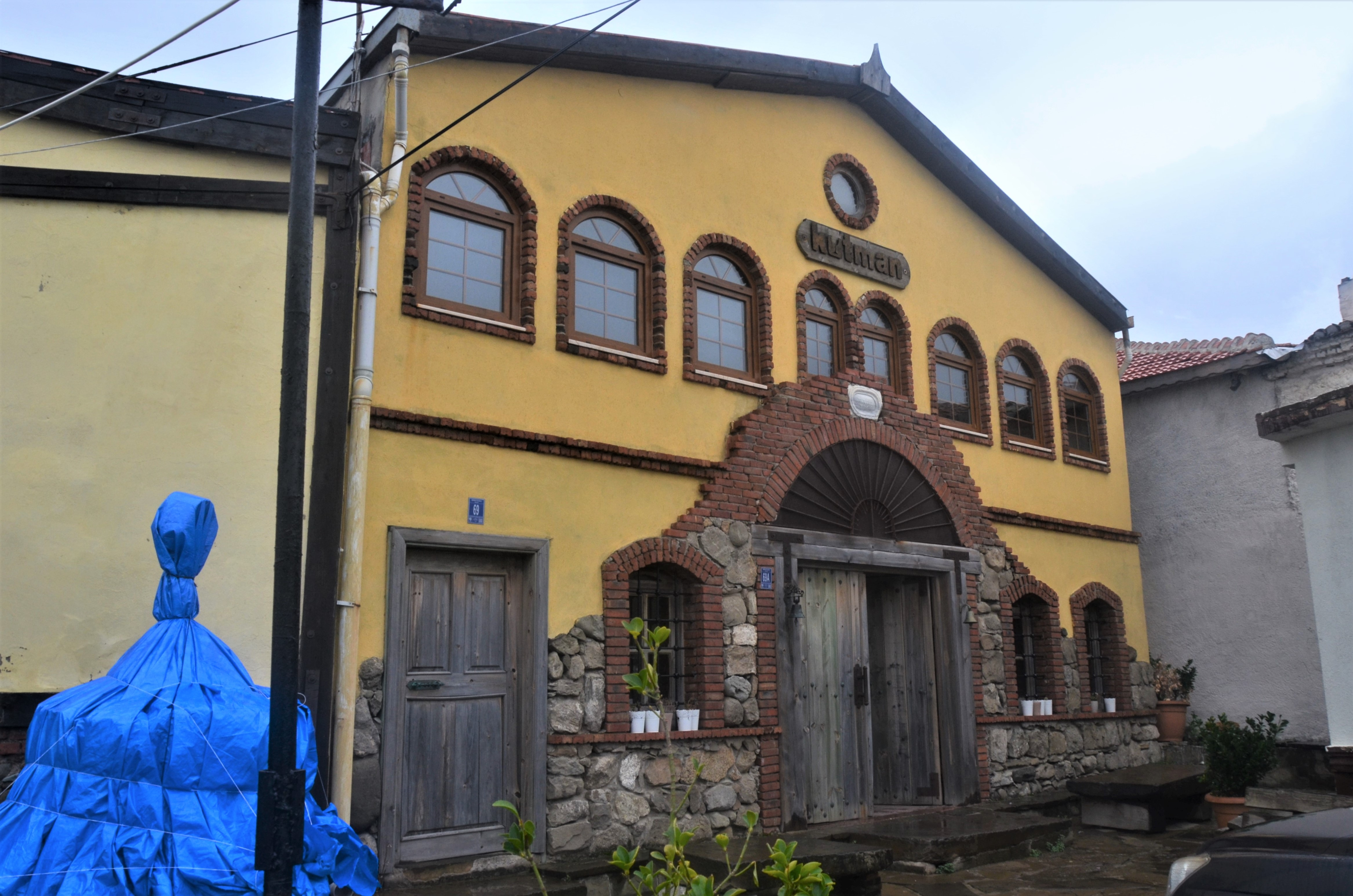
Kutman Wine Museum

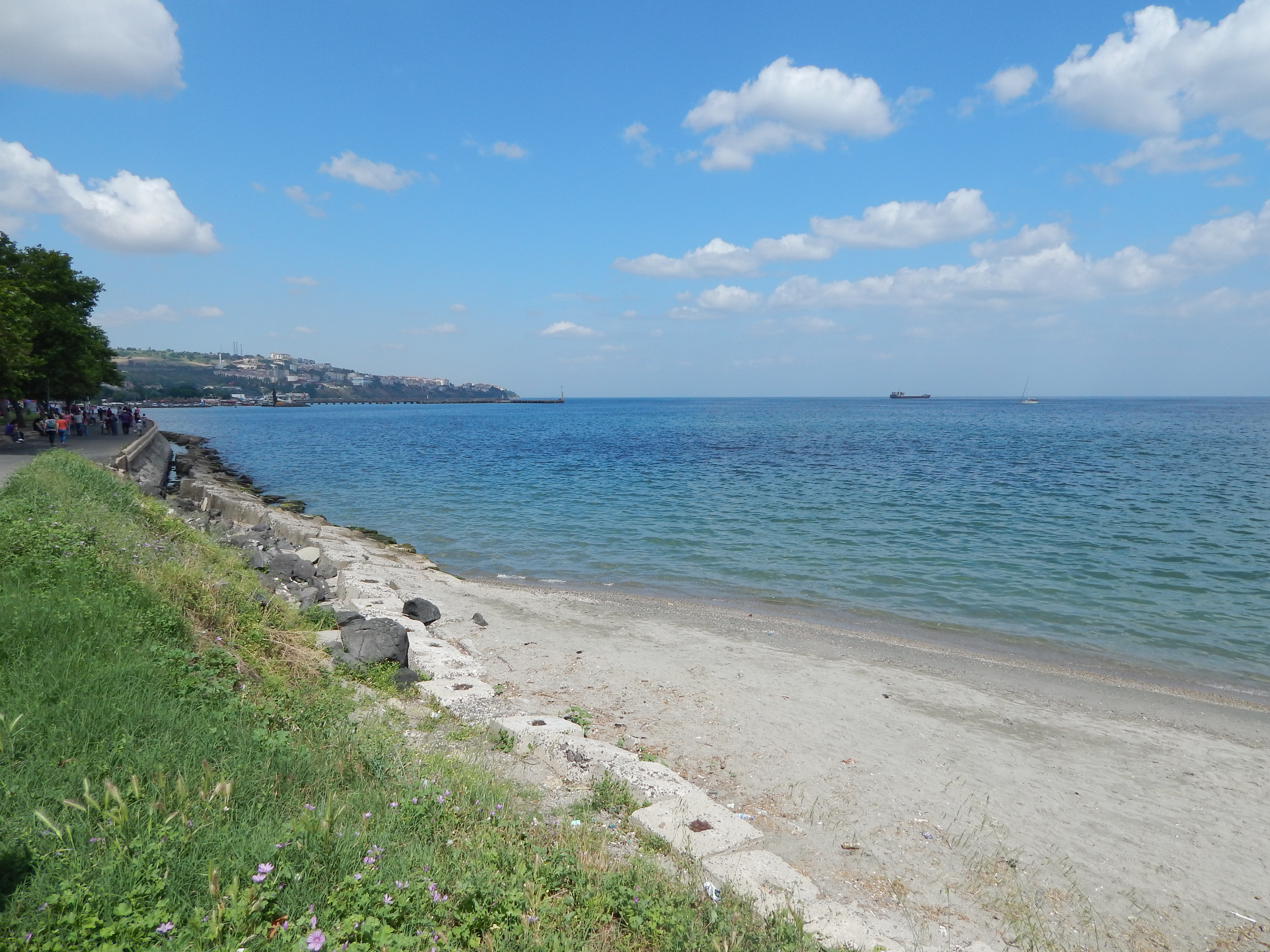
Tekirdağ coastline

The Tekirdağ area is the site of many holiday homes, as the city is only two hours drive from Istanbul via a new four-lane highway. The villages of Şarköy, Mürefte and Kumbağ are particularly popular with Turkish tourists. The Marmara Sea is polluted but there are still a number of public beaches near Tekirdağ, especially the Yeniçiftlik beaches.

Most Ottoman wooden buildings have been replaced by concrete apartment blocks although some are being restored or replaced with attractive replicas. Except for the Rüstem Paşa Camii, built by the Ottoman architect, Mimar Sinan, in the 16th century, and the narrow streets that help one imagine life in the Ottoman period, the city lacks antique charm. One reason to visit is the local delicacy, the small spicy cylindrical grilled meatballs called Tekirdağ köftesi, traditionally followed by courses of a sweet local cheese and semolina pudding.

The inland parts of Tekirdağ province offer fertile farmland suitable for winter wheat, sunflowers, cherries and grapes for wine-making.

Both the east–west highway (the Via Egnatia of Roman times) and the highway north toward Muratlı and Lüleburgaz are four lanes. There is a prison next to the rakı distillery and another north of the city on the road to Muratlı.

On the eastern edge of the city is the Namık Kemal University, founded in 2006, which has three faculties.

=== Tekirdağ rakı ===
This part of Turkey is well known for its high quality rakı. State-owned until the 1990s, the distilleries are now in private hands and the wine and rakı industries are undergoing a renewal despite being hampered by high taxation on alcohol.

== Attractions ==
=== In Tekirdağ ===
- The Rüstem Paşa Mosque, built by the Ottoman architect, Mimar Sinan, in 1553
- The Tekirdağ Museum of Archaeology and Ethnography contains archaeological artefacts found in and around the province, as well as ethnographical items used by the residents of the region.
- The Namık Kemal House Museum is devoted to the life and works of the Turkish nationalist poet Namık Kemal (1840–1888).
- The Rakoczi Museum is an 18th-century Turkish house, where the Hungarian national hero, Francis II Rákóczi lived during his exile from 1720 until his death in 1735. Today, it is the property of Hungary.
- Of all Turkey's many statues of Atatürk, the one in Tekirdağ town centre is the only one that was made exactly life-size.

=== Around Tekirdağ province ===
- The Kutman Wine Museum is at Mürefte in Şarköy

== Sport ==
The Tekirdağ Olympic Ice Skating Hall was opened at Süleymanpaşa district in 2018.

== Notable people ==
- Phaedimus of Bisanthe (3rd or 2nd century BC), ancient Greek poet
- Francis II Rákóczi (1676–1735), Hungarian prince and national hero
- Bekri Mustafa Pasha (1688–1698), Ottoman grand vizier
- Kelemen Mikes (1690–1761), Hungarian political figure and essayist
- Khachadour Paul Garabedian (1836–1881) was an Armenian-American officer in the United States Navy, considered the only soldier of Armenian heritage to have served in combat during the American Civil War.
- Cezayirli Gazi Hasan Pasha (1713–90)
- Namık Kemal (1840–1888), nationalist poet
- Memduh Şevket Esendal (1883–1952), writer
- Tekirdağlı Hüseyin Pehlivan, wrestling champion (1908–82)
- Solomon Maimon (Rabbi) (1918–2019), American Sephardic Rabbi
- Henri Verneuil (1920–2002), playwright and filmmaker
- Nefise Akçelik (1955–2003), civil engineer specializing in tunnel building
- Erhan Tabakoglu (born 1967), professor and rector of the Trakya University
- Rifat Karlova (born 1980), comedian and actor residing in Taiwan
- Emre Tetikel (born 1985), actor and novelist

== Twin towns – sister cities ==
Tekirdağ is twinned with:

- Bayreuth, Germany
- Kardzhali, Bulgaria
- Kecskemét, Hungary
- Sárospatak, Hungary
- Sliven, Bulgaria
- Techirghiol, Romania

== Namesakes ==
- Tekirdağ Province, which contains Tekirdağ
- TC-JGE, a Turkish Airlines Boeing 737-800 which crashed as Flight 1951 on 25 February 2009
- TC-JMJ, a Turkish Airlines Airbus A321

== Gallery ==
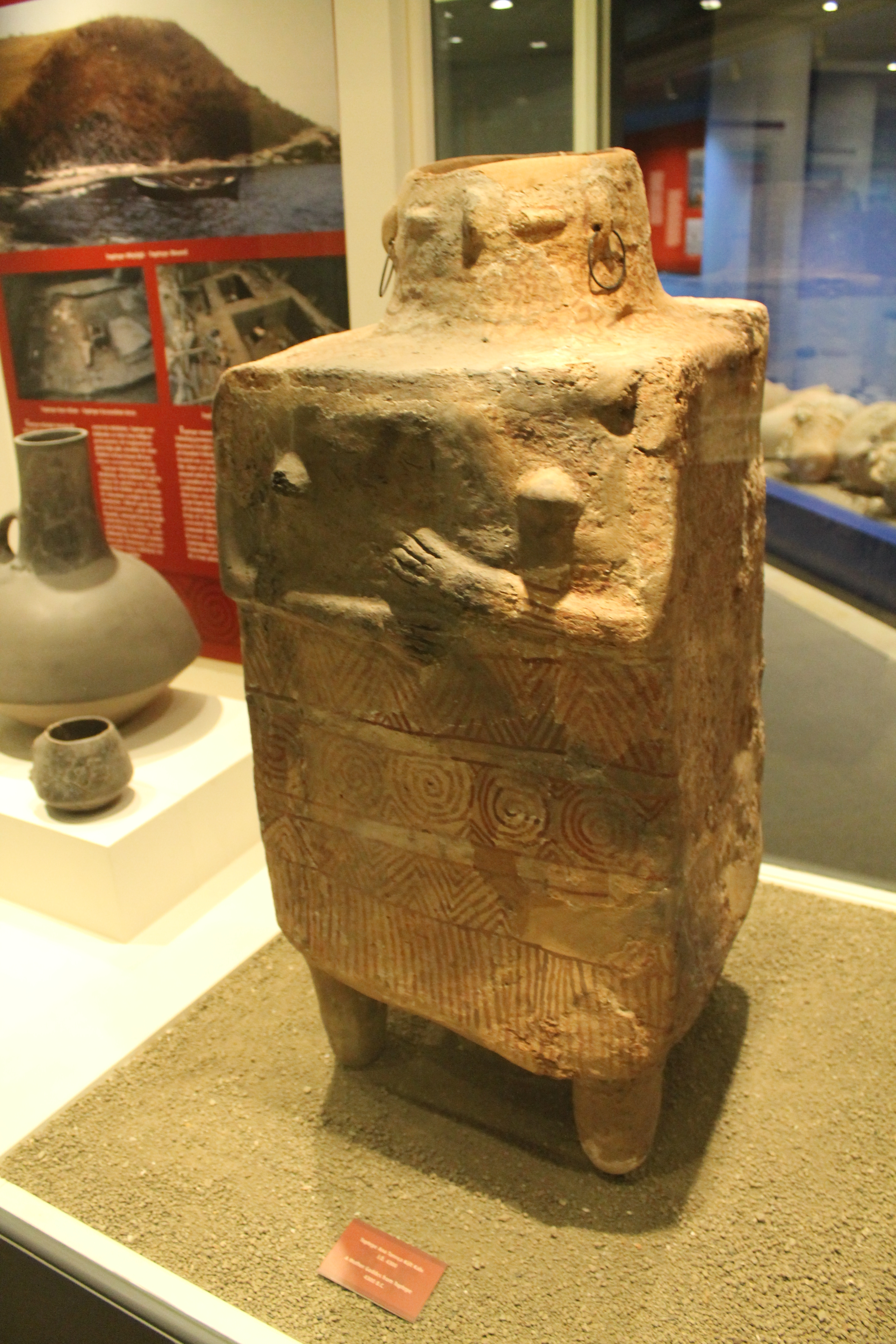
Mother goddess shaped pot (Tekirdağ Museum of Archaeology and Ethnography)

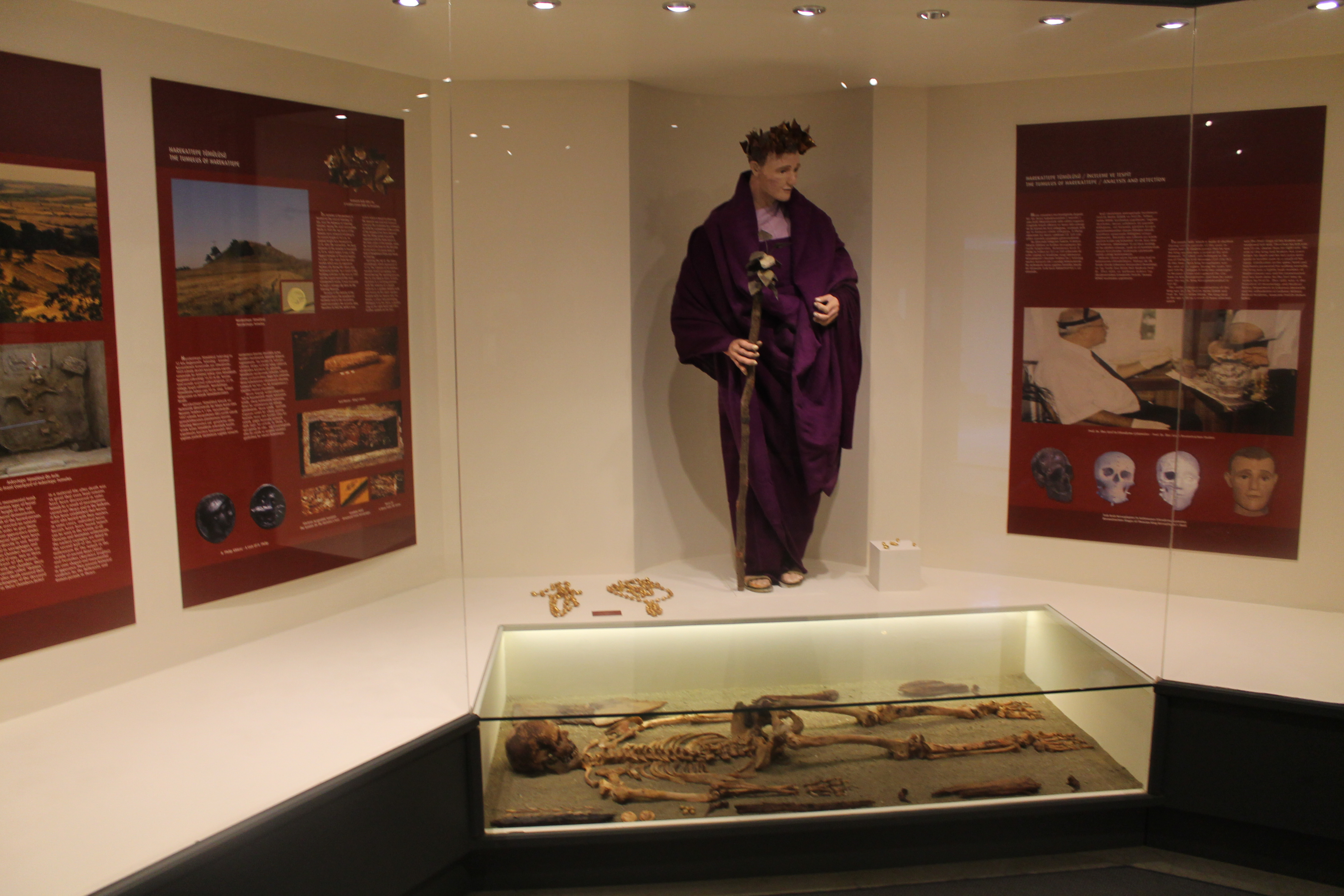
Thracian King Cersobleptes (Tekirdağ Museum of Archaeology and Ethnography)

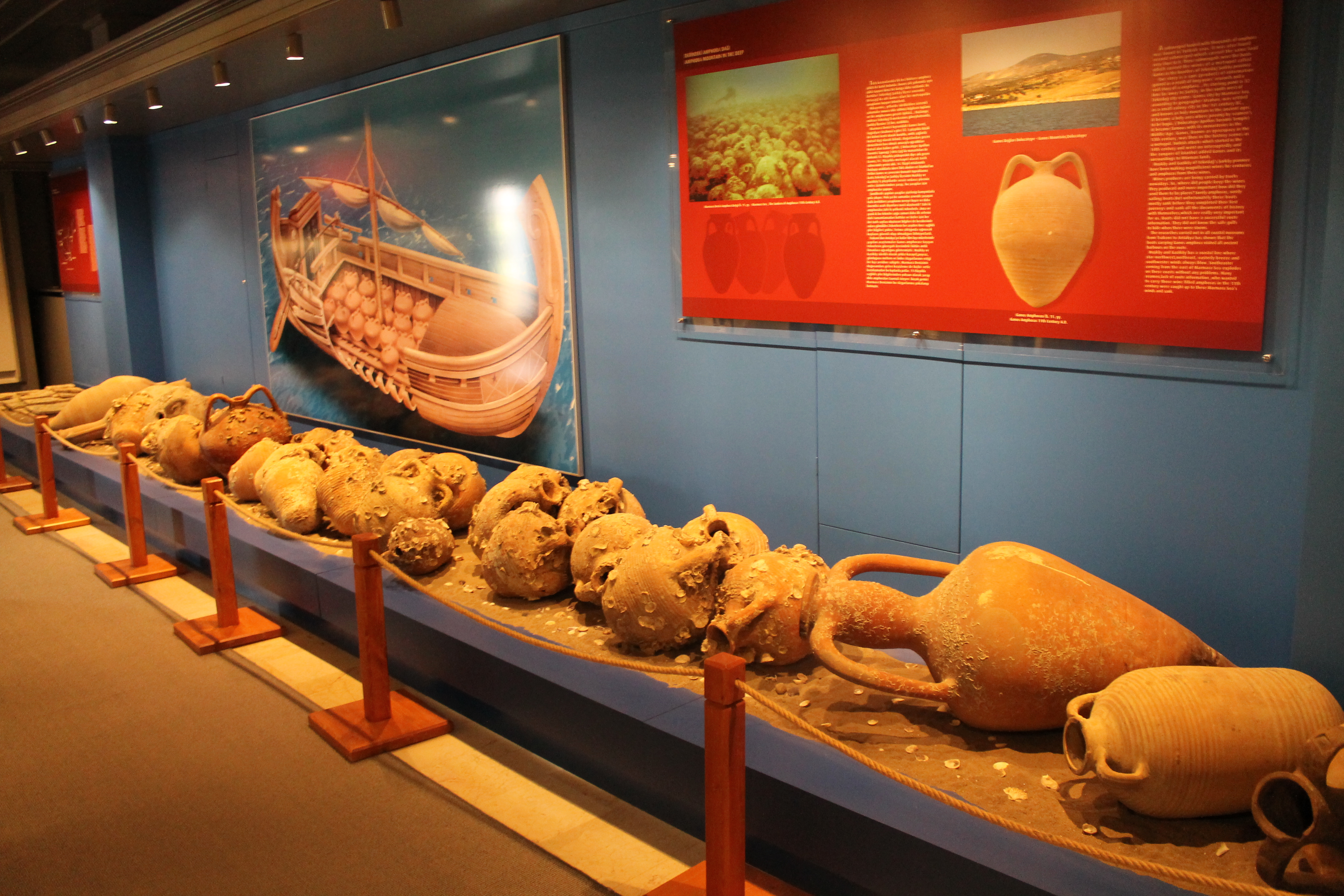
Amphoras (Tekirdağ Museum of Archaeology and Ethnography)

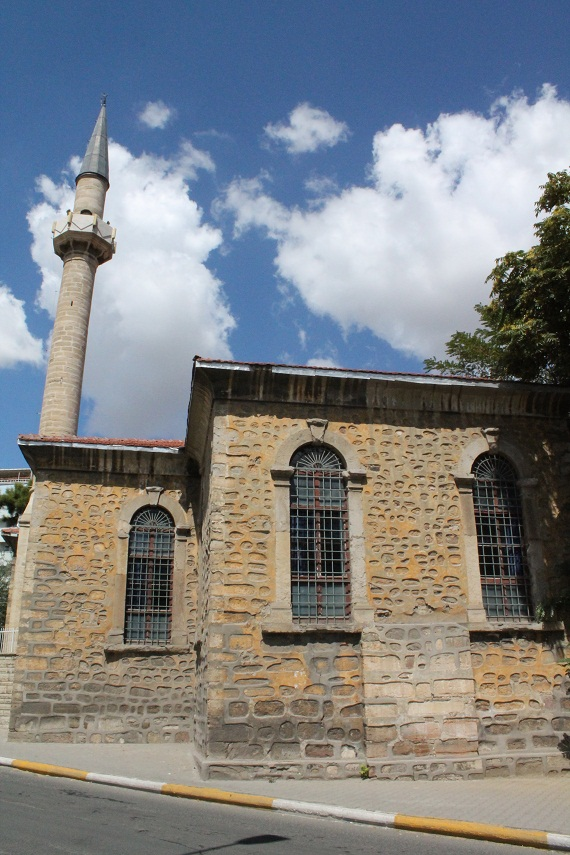
Orta Mosque (1855)

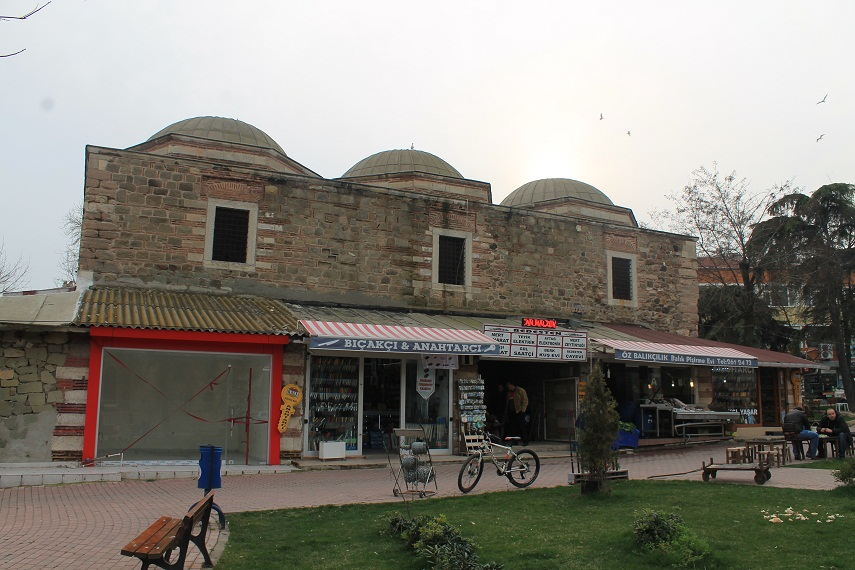
Bedesten (Ottoman Bazaar)

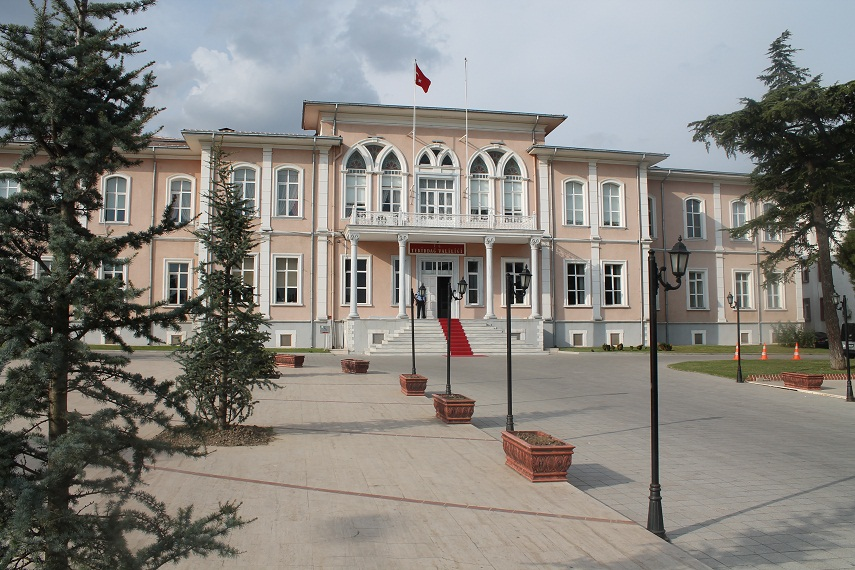
Provincial Government House

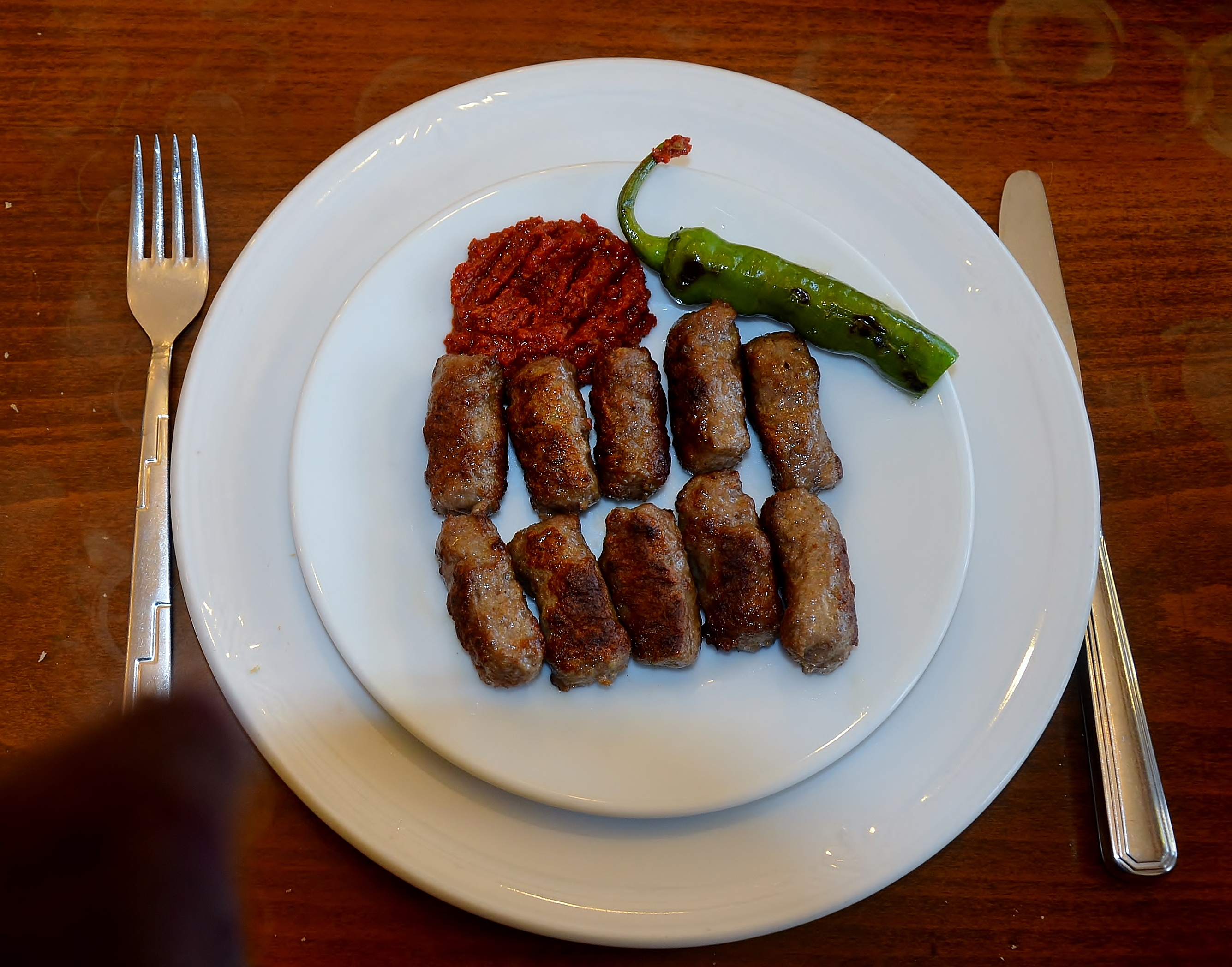
Tekirdağ Köfte, a local type of meatball

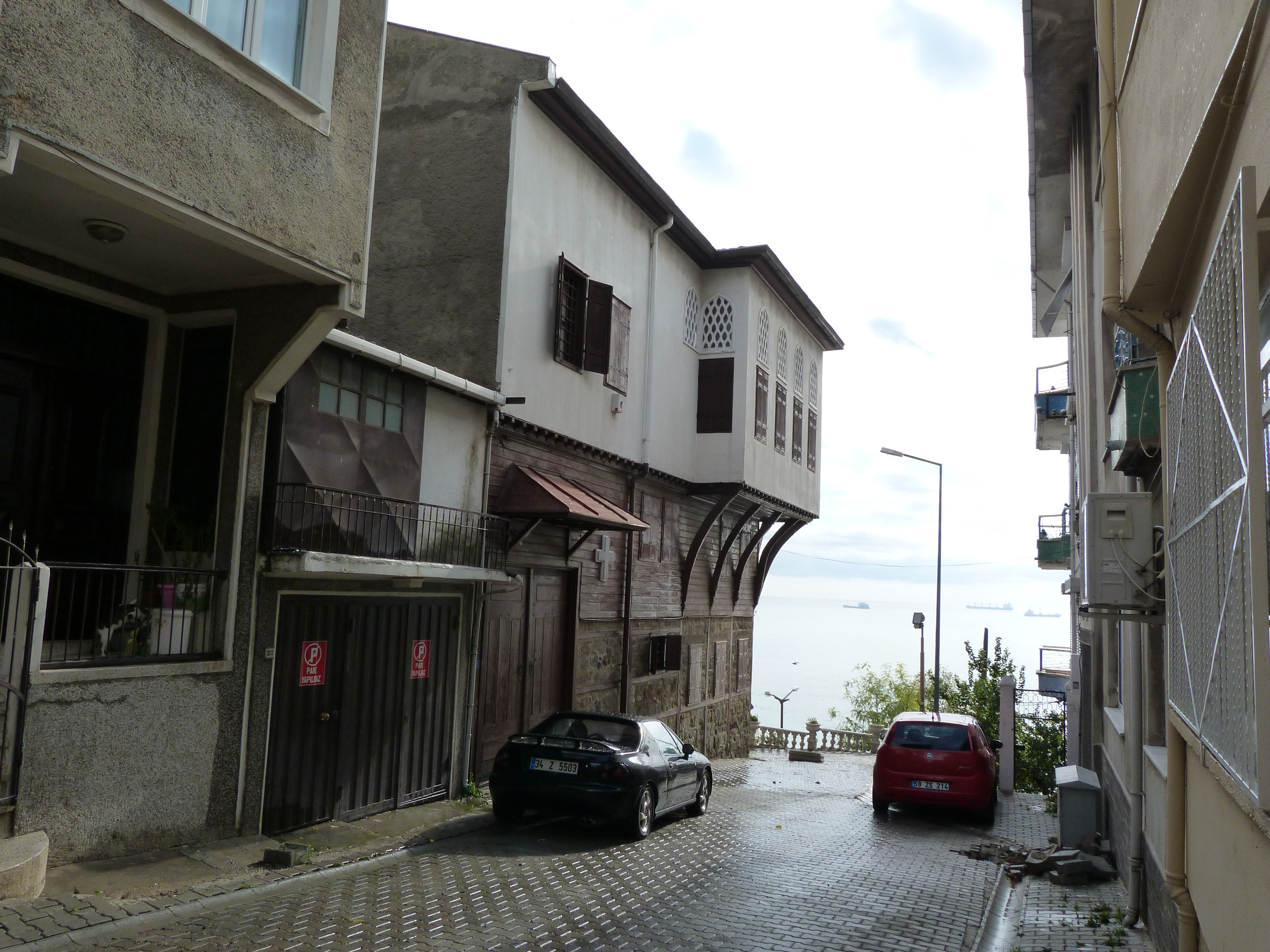
Street near the Rákóczi Museum

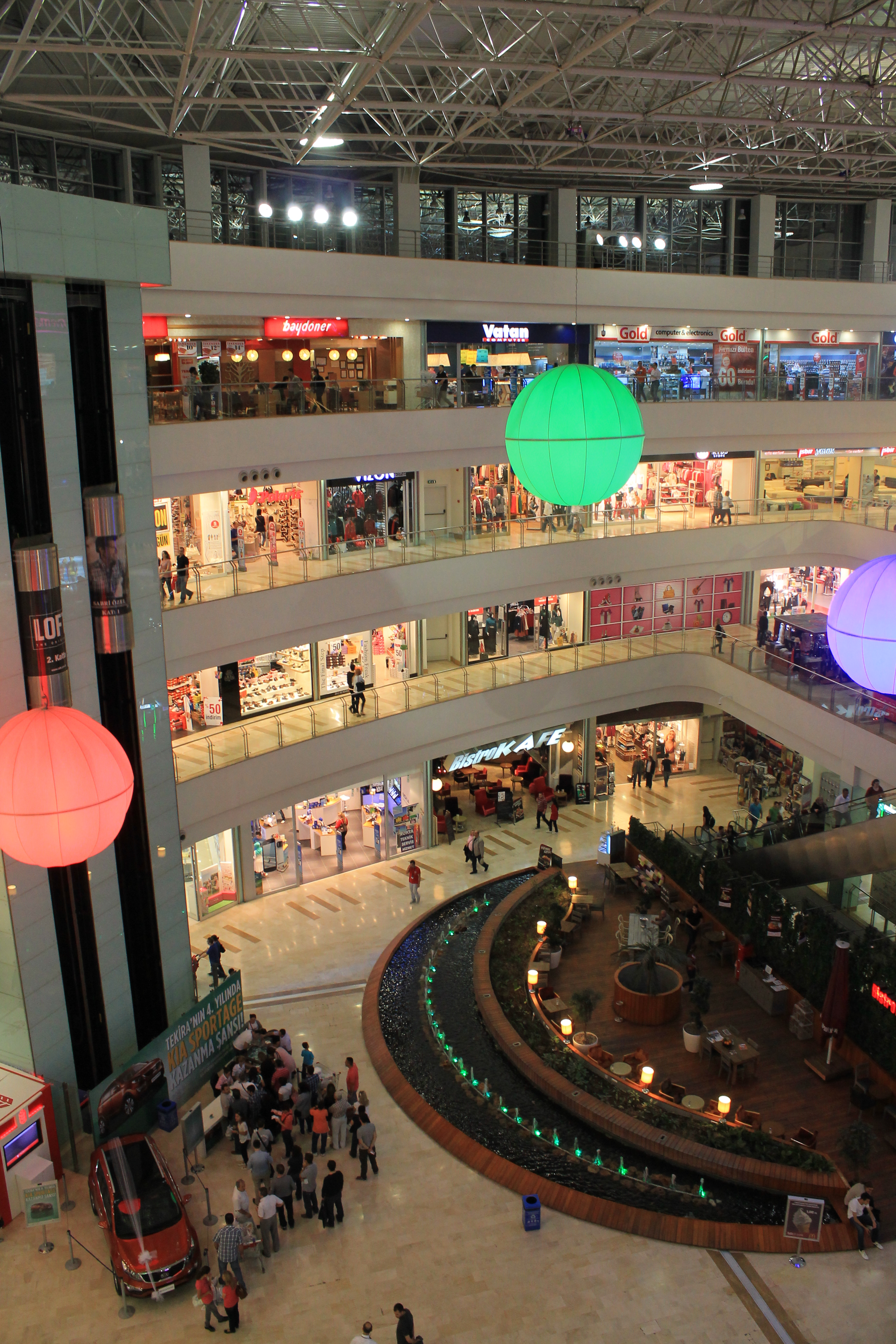
Tekira shopping mall

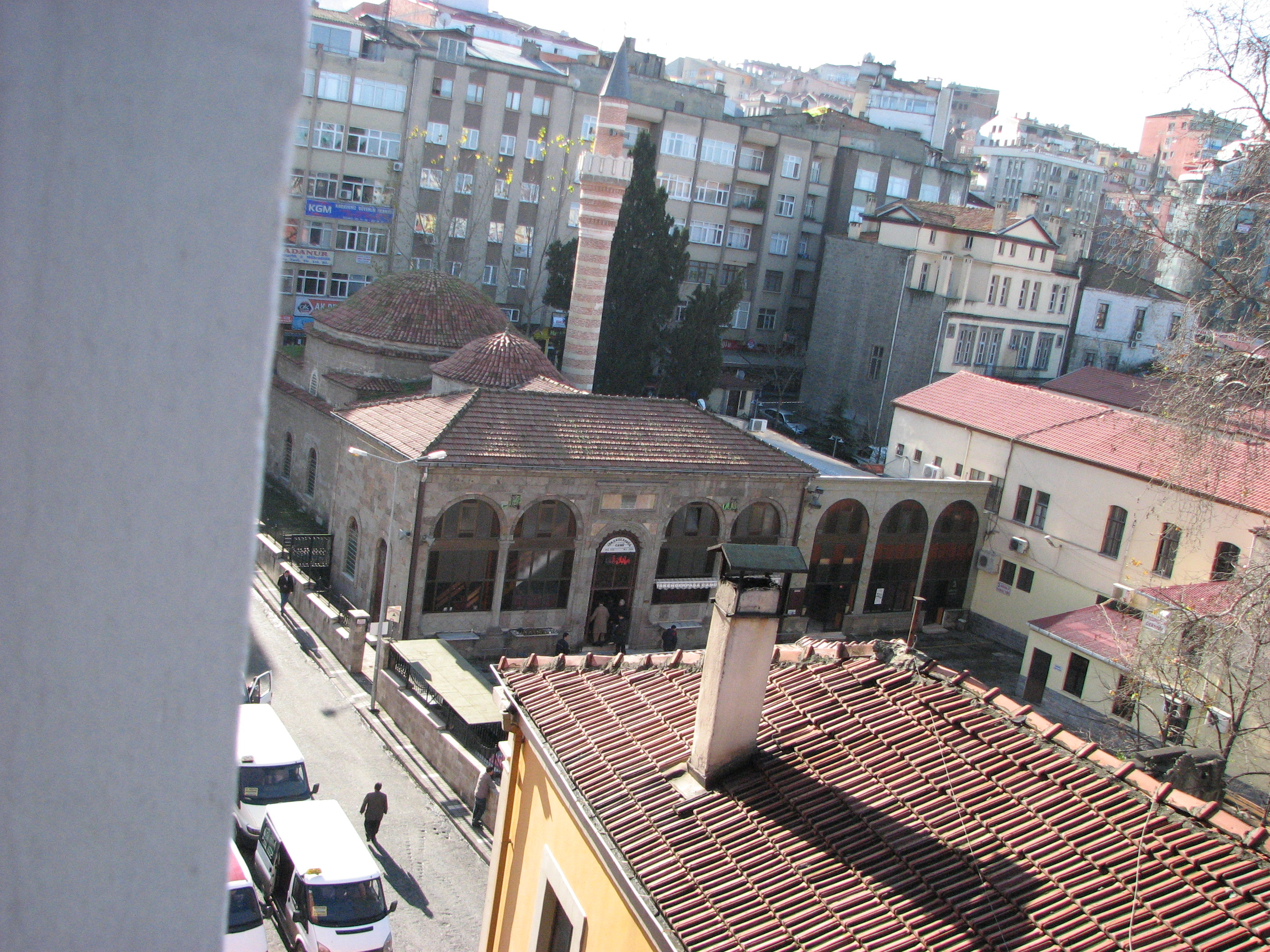
Usta Park Hotel, view towards city center

== See also ==
- Tsar Kaloyan of Bulgaria, destroyer of Rodosto in 1206.
- Turkish Airlines Flight 1951, A Boeing 737-800 that crashed. Named after this city.
