= Kozbükü Tunnel =

Highway tunnel in Ordu, Turkey

Kozbükü Tunnel Kozbükü Tüneli
- Interactive map of Kozbükü Tunnel; Kozbükü Tüneli

Overview
- Location: Fatsa, Ordu Province
- Coordinates: 40°59′40″N 37°38′38″E Location of Kozbükü Tunnel in Turkey
- Status: Operational
- Route: D.010 E70

Operation
- Work began: 1997
- Constructed: Nurol-Tekfen-Yüksel joint venture
- Opened: April 7, 2007; 19 years ago
- Operator: General Directorate of Highways
- Traffic: automotive

Technical
- Length: 261 and 257 m (856 and 843 ft)
- No. of lanes: 2 x 2
- Operating speed: 80 km/h (50 mph)

Kozbükü Tunnel (Turkish: Kozbükü Tüneli), is a highway tunnel constructed in Ordu Province, northern Turkey.

Kozbükü Tunnel is part of the Samsun-Ordu Highway D.010 E70 within the Black Sea Coastal Highway, of which construction was carried out by the Turkish Nurol-Tekfen-Yüksel joint venture. The 261 and 257 m (856 and 843 ft)-long twin-tube tunnel carrying two lanes of traffic in each direction is flanked by 116–150 m (381–492 ft)-long Kadıoğlu Tunnel in the west and 170–135 m (558–443 ft)-long Tekkebak Tunnel in the east on the same highway.

The tunnel was opened to traffic on April 7, 2007 by Turkish Prime Minister Recep Tayyip Erdoğan. Dangerous goods carriers are not permitted to use the tunnel.
