= Ordu Nefise Akçelik Tunnel =

Road tunnel in Ordu Province, Turkey

Ordu Nefise Akçelik Tunnel (Hapan Tunnel)
- Interactive map of Ordu Nefise Akçelik Tunnel (Hapan Tunnel)

Overview
- Location: Perşembe, Ordu Province
- Coordinates: 40.99052°N 37.68688°E Location of Ordu Nefise Akçelik Tunnel in Turkey

- Route: D.010 E70
- Start: Yarlı
- End: Kırlı

Operation
- Work began: 1997
- Constructed: Nurol-Tekfen-Yüksel joint venture
- Opened: April 7, 2007; 19 years ago
- Operator: General Directorate of Highways
- Traffic: automotive

Technical
- Length: 3,805 and 3,825 m (12,484 and 12,549 ft)
- No. of lanes: 2 x 2
- Operating speed: 80 km/h (50 mph)
- Max elevation: 220 m (720 ft)
- Min elevation: 220 m (720 ft)

Ordu Nefise Akçelik Tunnel (Turkish: Ordu Nefise Akçelik Tüneli), originally Hapan Tunnel, (Turkish: Hapan Tüneli) is a highway tunnel constructed in Ordu Province, northern Turkey. With its length of 3,825 m (12,549 ft), it was the country's longest tunnel at the time of its opening. The tunnel is named in honor of the Turkish female civil engineer and earth scientist Nefise Akçelik (1955-2003).

== Construction ==
Ordu Nefise Akçelik Tunnel is part of the Samsun-Ordu Highway D.010 E70 within the Black Sea Coastal Highway, the construction of which was carried out by the Turkish Nurol-Tekfen-Yüksel joint venture. The cost of the tunnel totalled to TL 361 million (approx. US$265 million as of 2007 exchange rate). The 3,805 and 3,825 m (12,484 and 12,549 ft)-long twin-tube tunnel carrying two lanes of traffic in each direction is flanked by 170–135 m (558–443 ft)-long Tekkebak Tunnel in the west and 310–314 m (1,017–1,030 ft)-long Asarkayası Tunnel in the east on the same highway. Traffic in the tunnel is controlled by 81 cameras at 16 different stations.

The tunnel crosses mountainous area between the settlements Yarlı and Kırlı in Perşembe district of Ordu Province at 220 m (720 ft) elevation. It allows a short cut of 15 km (9.3 mi) between the town Fatsa and the city of Ordu saving one and half hours driving time.

== Naming and opening to traffic ==
Originally, the tunnel was named Hapan Tunnel. Its name was changed to Nefise Akçelik (1955-2003) in honor of the female civil engineer and earth scientist, who, working at the General Directorate of Highways, contributed much to the construction of tunnels in Turkey. Finally, it was officially renamed Ordu Nefise Akçelik Tunnel in March 2007.

The tunnel was opened to traffic on April 7, 2007 by Turkish Prime Minister Recep Tayyip Erdoğan. Dangerous goods carriers are not permitted to use the tunnel.
