= Nefise Akçelik =

Turkish civil engineer (1955–2003)

- Born: 1955; Muratlı
- Died: 5 October 2003 (aged 47–48)
- Occupation: Civil Engineer

Nefise Akçelik (b. 1955, Muratlı - d. 5 October 2003) was a Turkish civil engineer who specialised in building tunnels. The Ordu Nefise Akçelik Tunnel is named in her honour.

== Early life and education ==
Akçelik was born in the Muratlı district of Tekirdağ in Turkey in 1955. She completed her secondary education at Erenköy Kız Lisesi’ the Erenköy Girls' High School in Istanbul.

Age 16, Akçelik enrolled in the civil engineering department of Karadeniz Teknik Üniversitesi (KTÜ) where she was the only female student in her department. Akçelik graduated from university in 1976 at the age of 20, having learned English and French as well as civil engineering.

In 1989, Akçelik earned a master's degree from the Department of Geotechnics in the Institute of Science at Gazi University in Ankara and received the title of technical chief.

== Career ==
In 1978, she started working at the General Directorate of Highways Technical Research Department, in the Ground Mechanics and Tunnels Branch Directorate. She was appointed as chief of tunnel and structures, then promoted to become deputy branch manager and branch manager.

Akçelik worked on over 200 tunnel and geotechnical projects in her career. She prepared specifications for tunnel projects, construction and road engineering services. Akçelik wrote two books on problems in tunnel construction and weak ground problems and precautions on highways and authored 21 articles which were published in national and international conference proceedings.

Akçelik spoke at the conference on the Use of Underground Structures organised by the International Tunneling and Underground Space Association in Istanbul in October 2002 and contributed to the organisation's international working groups.

She was known for helping to support other women engineers.

Nefise Akçelik retired in September 2003.

== Personal life ==
Nefise Akçelik, married her colleague İbrahim Ethem Akçelik in 1978. The couple had a daughter, Oya, in 1979 and a son, Oğuz, in 1989.

According to her husband, Akçelik was a socialist, anti-capitalist, anti-militarist and internationalist.

She died on October 5, 2003, of complications from cancer.

== Commemoration ==
The Hapan Tunnel, which Akçelik was involved in building but did not live to see completed was renamed the Ordu Nefise Akçelik Tunnel in her honour in 2007. The highway tunnel is in Ordu Province, northern Turkey. At a length of 3,825 m (12,549 ft), it was the country's longest tunnel at the time of its opening.

Nefise Akçelik was commemorated at the 31st International Tunneling and Underground Space Association World Tunneling Congress in 2005.
