= Rail transport in Tibet =

Rail transport in Tibet began with the opening of the Qinghai–Tibet railway on 1 July 2006. It is the highest railway line in the world. As of October 2025, there were four planned railway lines which will connect the Tibet Autonomous Region to the rest of China's national rail network.

== Background ==
The western regions of the People's Republic of China, including Tibet, have been one of the country's least connected economically to the rest of China. In 2024, Tibet's economic growth was 6% and was one of China's fastest growing regions. Additional infrastructure is expected to improve connections to South Asia and complement China's Belt and Road Initiative. Social and political reasons are also cited by critics for railway construction in Tibet.

== History ==
On 1 July 2006, the Qinghai–Tibet railway opened.

On 15 August 2014, the Lhasa–Shigatse railway was opened as a spur of the Qinghai–Tibet railway.

As of November 2020, the Sichuan–Tibet railway is expected to be completed in 2030.

On 25 June 2021, the Lhasa–Nyingchi railway began operation, a part of the Sichuan–Tibet railway.

As of May 2022, the Yunnan–Tibet railway is scheduled to be completed by 2030.

As of October 2025, the Xinjiang–Tibet railway was scheduled to begin construction in the following month.

== See also ==
- China–Nepal railway, a planned railway between Shigatse and Kathmandu
