= List of transport megaprojects =

This is a list of megaprojects within the transport sector. Take care in comparing the cost of projects from different times—even a few years apart—due to inflation; comparing nominal costs without taking this into account can be highly misleading. Note that inflation-calculated values are current as of 2025.

According to the Oxford Handbook of Megaproject Management in 2017, "Megaprojects are large-scale, complex ventures that typically cost $1 billion or more, take many years to develop and build, involve multiple public and private stakeholders, are transformational, and impact millions of people."

== Completed projects ==
Project	Description	Country	Location	Est. cost (USD billions)		Start of construction	Year of completion	Image	Notes
Project	Description	Country	Location	At or near time of completion	Adjusted for inflation	Start of construction	Year of completion	Image	Notes
Tokaido Shinkansen	High-speed rail	Japan	Taiheiyō Belt	1.06	8.4	1959	1964	Map of Tokaidō Shinkansen	Original segment of the first shinkansen line
Çanakkale 1915 Bridge	Bridge (road)	Turkey	Çanakkale	4	4.68	2017	2022		Spans two continents. Longest suspension bridge span in the world.
Sha Tin to Central Link	Rapid transit	Hong Kong	Hong Kong, From Tai Wai, New Territories to Admiralty, Hong Kong Island	11.6	14	2012	2022		HK$90.7 billion
La Línea Tunnel	Tunnel (road)	Colombia	Cordillera Central	0.27	0.33	2009	2020	Cross-section of the tunnel	
Thameslink Programme	Commuter rail upgrade	United Kingdom	Southeast England	8.97	10.98	2009	2020	Blackfriars Underground station work site	(GBP7bn)
Alaskan Way Viaduct replacement tunnel	Tunnel (road)	United States	Seattle	3.3	4.1	2013	2019		
MRT Yellow Line	Rapid Transit	Thailand	Bangkok Metropolian Region		1.68	2017	2023		As of now. No extension is planned
MRT Pink Line	Rapid Transit	Thailand	Bangkok Metropolian Region		1.6	2017	2025		Last extension in May 2025
Santiago Metro Line 3, Phase One and 2023 extension.	Rapid transit	Chile	Santiago	2.17	2.54	2012	2023		Combined cost of initial line and extension.
Santiago Metro Line 6	Rapid transit	Chile	Santiago	1.26	1.63	2014	2017	Map of Line 6	
Crimean Bridge	Bridge (rail/road)		Russia (one end is recognized internationally as being owned by Ukraine, but is de facto controlled by Russia)	3.7	4.7	2015	2019		
Hong Kong–Zhuhai–Macau Bridge	Bridge–tunnel	China	Hong Kong, (China) Zhuhai, and Macau	19.2	24.2	2009	2018		¥127 billion
New Tappan Zee Bridge	Bridge (road)	United States	South Nyack to Tarrytown, New York	3.98	5.02	2013	2018		
Tel Aviv–Jerusalem railway	Railway	Israel	Jerusalem, Israel	1.9–2.5	2.4–3.2	2001	2004 (first section); 2007 (second section); 2018 (final section)		NIS7-9 billion
Abuja Light Rail (phase 1 nearing completion)	Light Rail	Nigeria	Abuja	2.7	3.4	2007	2018	Abuja Rail Mass Transit	
Noord/Zuidlijn	Rapid transit line	Netherlands	Amsterdam	4.32	6.29	2002	2018	2011-05-12 Startschacht Damrak	(€3.1bn)
Klang Valley MRT Line 1	Rapid transit	Malaysia	Kuala Lumpur	11.7	16.2	2012	2017	MRT SBK Semantan station2	(MYR36B)
Ionia Odos	Highway	Greece	Western Greece	1.8	2.4	2007	2017		(€1.4bn)
Otoyol 5	Highway	Turkey	Istanbul to İzmir	7	8.7	2013	2019		Including Osman Gazi Bridge which has the 8th longest suspension bridge span in the world.
German Unification Transport Projects (Verkehrsprojekt Deutsche Einheit)	Transport project to achieve German unity	Germany	Germany	42	54.2	1991	2016 – continues expansion until 2020	Karte Verkehrsprojekte Deutsche Einheit	
AVE - Spain's high-speed railway network	High-speed rail	Spain	Spain	44	58.9	1992	2016 - continues expansion		40 billion euros
Yavuz Sultan Selim Bridge	Bridge (rail/road)	Turkey	Istanbul	2	2.7	2013	2016		World's fifth-tallest bridge of any type.
Evergreen Point Floating Bridge	Bridge (road)	United States	Seattle and Medina, Washington	4.56	5.99	2012	2016		
Eurasia Tunnel	Tunnel (undersea, road)	Turkey	Istanbul	1.3	1.7	2011	2016		Spans two continents.
Gotthard Base Tunnel	Tunnel (rail)	Switzerland	Swiss Alps	9.7	12.7	1999	2016		(CHF 9.56 billion)
World Trade Center Transportation Hub	Transit center and retail	United States	New York City	3.9	5.2	2006	2016		
Blanka tunnel complex	Tunnel (road)	Czechia	Prague	1.75	2.3	2006	2015		43bn Kč
Adler–Krasnaya Polyana road and railway	Highway and railway	Russia	Russia	9.4	12.6	2010	2014		
Budapest Metro Line 4	Rapid transit line	Hungary	Budapest	1.95	2.65	2004	2014		(HUF 452.5 bn)
Marina Coastal Expressway	Highway	Singapore	Singapore	3.4	4.6	2008	2013		(S$4.3 bn)
Marmaray Tunnel	Tunnel (undersea, rail)	Turkey	Istanbul	4.5	5.3	2004	2008(Phase I); 2013(Phase II)		Deepest immersed tube tunnel in the world.
Eastern span replacement of the San Francisco–Oakland Bay Bridge	Bridge (road)	United States	San Francisco Bay Area	6.5	8.8	2002	2013		
Russky Bridge	Bridge (road)	Russia	Vladivostok (Muravyov-Amursky Peninsula) and Russky Island	1.1	1.5	2008	2012		
Freeway Durango-Mazatlán and Baluarte Bridge	Highway and road bridge	Mexico	Durango – Sinaloa	1.46	2	2008	2012		
Jiaozhou Bay Bridge	Bridge (road)	China	Shandong	1.5	2.1	2007	2011		
Beijing–Shanghai high-speed railway	High-speed rail	China	Eastern China (Beijing to Shanghai, via Tianjin and Nanjing)	33.1	46.7	2008	2011		(RMB 220.9bn)
Clem Jones Tunnel	Tunnel (road)	Australia	Brisbane	3.3	4.7	2006	2010		
CBD and South East Light Rail	Light rail	Australia	Sydney	2.2	2.7	2015	2019		
Wuhan–Guangzhou high-speed railway	High-speed rail	China	China	17.1	24.9	2005	2009		(RMB 116.6bn)
Egnatia Odos	Highway	Greece	Northern Greece	8.4	12.2	1994	2009		(€5.9bn)
Incheon Bridge	Bridge (road)	South Korea	Incheon	2.12	3.1	2005	2009		(₩2.45 trillion; source listed that as being equivalent to US$2.12 billion)
Sound Transit '1 line' (initial segment)	Light rail	United States	Seattle metropolitan area	2.9	4.2	2003	2009		
Bologna–Florence high-speed railway	High-speed rail	Italy	Italy	7.8	11.2	1996	2009		(€5.89 billion)
Milan–Bologna high-speed railway	High-speed rail	Italy	Italy	9.2	13.2	1993	2008		(€6.92 billion)
Beijing–Tianjin intercity railway	High-speed rail	China	Beijing and Tianjin	2.34	3.4	2005	2008		
High Speed 1	High-speed rail	United Kingdom	South East England	13.7	20.5	1998	2007	Map overview of the rail's route	(£6.84 billion)
Lötschberg Base Tunnel (initial bore)	Tunnel (rail)	Switzerland	Swiss Alps	3.6	5.4	1999	2007		(CHF 4.3 billion)
Copenhagen Metro phase 1–3	Rapid transit	Denmark	Copenhagen	1.47	2.2	1996	2007		11,400,000,000 DKK
"Big Dig" Central Artery/Tunnel Project	Tunnel (road)	United States	Boston	22	32.3	1991	2007		14.6 billion USD; additional $7 billion in interest
Colorado T-REX Project (TRansportation EXpansion)	Highway & Light rail upgrade	United States	Denver	1.7	2.6	2001	2006		
Shanghai Maglev Train	High-speed rail, Maglev	China	Shanghai	1.4	2.3	2001	2004		
Red Line and Purple Line	Rapid transit	United States	Los Angeles	4.5	8	1986	2000		represents expenditure prior to the D Line Extension
Toei Ōedo Line	Rapid transit	Japan	Tokyo	8.68	15.8	1988	2000		(¥988.6 billion in 1999 yen values)
Jubilee Line Extension	Rapid transit line	United Kingdom	London	6.83	9.83	1993	1999		3.5 billion GBP US$6.83 billion is for 2010 prices
Honshu-Shikoku Bridge Project	Bridges 17 bridges connecting the islands of Honshū and Shikoku	Japan	Japan	48	87.1	1978	1999		4 trillion Yen
Øresund Bridge	Bridge–tunnel (rail/road)	Denmark, Sweden	Denmark - Sweden	5.7	10.3	1995	1999		(DKK30.1bn)
Great Belt Fixed Link	Bridge–tunnel (rail/road)	Denmark	Denmark	3.2	7.5	1988	1998		(DKK21.4bn)
Vasco da Gama Bridge	Bridge (road)	Portugal	Lisbon	1.3	2.6	1995	1998		(€897m / 180bn PTE)
Akashi-Kaikyō Bridge	Bridge (road)	Japan	Kobe	5	9.2	1988	1998		
Channel Tunnel	Tunnel (undersea, rail)		Strait of Dover, English Channel between the United Kingdom and France	15.4	30.3	1988	1994		(GBP9.5bn)
Interstate Highway System	Highway Network	United States	United States	114	641	1956	1992		425 billion in 2006 dollars 548 billion in 2021 dollars
Baikal–Amur Mainline	Railway	USSR (modern-day Russia)	Sovetskaya Gavan to Tayshet (modern-day Russia)	15	39.3	1974	1984		
Bay Area Rapid Transit	Rapid transit	United States	San Francisco Bay Area	1.586	7	1964	1976 - continues expansion		$12.2 billion adjusted for inflation
St. Lawrence Seaway	Canal system	United States, Canada	St Lawrence River and North American Great Lakes between the United States and Canada	0.470	4	1954	1959		
Caracas-La Guaira highway	Highway	Venezuela	Greater Caracas	0.06	0.6	1950	1953		
Trans-Siberian Railway	Railway	Russian Empire (modern-day Russia)	Moscow to Russian Far East (Vladivostok) (modern-day Russia)	0.770	15.7	1891	1916		
Panama Canal	Canal	Panama	Panama	0.375	8.9	1881	1914		
First transcontinental railroad	Railway	United States	Omaha, Nebraska, to Sacramento, California	0.1	2.1	1863	1869		$2.15 billion adjusted for inflation
Suez Canal	Canal	Khedivate of Egypt (modern-day Egypt)	Sinai Peninsula, Khedivate of Egypt (modern-day Egypt)	0.082	1.8	1859	1869		
Suez Canal expansion	Canal expansion	Egypt	Sinai Peninsula	8	10.6	2014	2015		
Washington Metro	Rapid transit	United States	Washington metropolitan area	9.4	16.3	1969	2001		
Silver Line	Rapid transit	United States	Northern Virginia	6	7	2009	2014 (Phase 1); 2022 (Phase 2)	WMATA Alstom 6000 Series On The Silver Line	While the Silver Line runs through Maryland and through Washington, D.C., the actual new sections of railway were all located in Northern Virginia.
Mid-Coast Extension of the Blue Line (San Diego Trolley)	Light rail	United States	San Diego	2.17	2.54	2016	2021		
Green Line Extension	Light rail	United States	Greater Boston	2.28	2.7	2012	2022	The new Lechmere station under construction in May 2020	
Highway Vespucio Oriente	Tunnel (road)	Chile	Santiago	1.1	1.3	2017	2022		
East Side Access project (including Grand Central Madison station)	Transit center, commuter rail	United States	New York City	11.1	13	2007	2023		The East Side Access project, including Grand Central Madison station, allows Long Island Rail Road service to Grand Central Terminal.
Taichung MRT	Rapid transit	Taiwan	Taichung	2.08	2.55	2009	2021		
Almaty Metro	Rapid transit	Kazakhstan	Almaty	1	1.4	1988 (was temporarily suspended as a result of the collapse of the Soviet Union)	2011		
Dubai Metro	Rapid transit	United Arab Emirates	Dubai	7.62	11.1	2006	2009		
Canada Line	Rapid transit	Canada	Greater Vancouver	1.79	2.61	2005	2009	Canada Line (sky blue) as part of the Metro Vancouver transit system in 2016	$2.05 billion CAD – set as the value for 2009, though estimate was originally made in 2006
Second Avenue Subway, Phase 1	Rapid transit	United States	New York City	4.4	5.8	2007	2017		Inflation is based on 2016, as the line opened on January 1 of 2017; construction was thus technically completed before then.
Silicon Valley BART extension, Phase I	Rapid transit	United States	San Francisco Bay Area	2.3	2.8	2012	2020		
Algiers Metro (original section of Line 1)	Rapid transit	Algeria	Algiers	1.2	1.7	1982 (was suspended for a time)	2011		
Changsha Metro, Line 2	Rapid transit	China	Changsha	1.8	2.3	2009	2014		
Doha Metro	Rapid transit	Qatar	Doha	36	44.7	2013	2019		
Mombasa–Nairobi Standard Gauge Railway	Railway	Kenya	Mombasa NairobiNaivasha	5.3	6.6	2013	2019		Original phase: $3.8bn and extension: 1.5bn
Edinburgh Trams	Light rail	United Kingdom	Edinburgh	1.72	2.3	2008	2014		(£1.043bn)
Padma Bridge	Bridge (rail/road)	Bangladesh	Padma River	3.6	4.2	2014	2022		
Woodrow Wilson Bridge	Bridge (Bascule)	United States	Washington metropolitan area	2.357	3.21	2000	2013		
Verrazzano–Narrows Bridge (original/upper deck)	Bridge (road)	United States	New York City	0.320	2.54	1959	1964		
AirTrain JFK	People mover	United States	New York City	1.9	3.2	1998	2003		While it does serve passengers within JFK, it was primarily built for transport between the airport and the city.
Taiwan High Speed Rail	High-speed rail	Taiwan	Taiwan	14.63	21.85	2000	2007		480.6 billion converted to USD in 2007 dollars is $14.63 billion.
Goethals Bridge (replacement)	Bridge (road)	United States	New York City and New Jersey	1.25	1.58	2014	2017 (New eastbound span); 2018 (New westbound span)		
Danyang-Kunshan Grand Bridge	Bridge (rail)	China	Shanghai and Nanjing	8.5	11.98	2006	2011 (construction ended in 2010; opened in 2011)		
Bolshaya Koltsevaya line	Rapid transit	Russia	Moscow	8.59	11.08	2011	2023		
Seikan Tunnel	Tunnel (undersea, rail)	Japan	Tsugaru Strait	8.58	20.1	1971	1988		
Rennes Metro Line B	Rapid transit	France	Rennes	1.405	1.64	2014	2022	Line B in green	€1.342 billion converted to USD based on average rate for 2022
Paris Métro Line 14 (original segment)	Rapid transit	France	Paris	1.2682	2.069	1993	2007		Inflation clock starting in 2004
Crossrail 1	Commuter rail, Rapid transit	United Kingdom	Greater London	23.0	26.9	2007	2023		A new 73m (117 km) railway line in England, serving London, Berkshire, Buckinghamshire & Essex. Core section opened May 24, 2022, full integration of routes and completion expected by May 2023.
Regional Connector	Light rail tunnel	United States	Downtown Los Angeles	1.8	2	2014	2023		
IRT Broadway–Seventh Avenue Line	Rapid transit	United States	New York City	0.06	1.51	1900	1908		
Lekki Port	Seaport	Nigeria	Lekki	1.5	1.6	2015	2023		
Ohio River Bridges Project	Bridges and interchange reconfiguration	United States	Louisville metropolitan area	2.3	2.78	2014	2017		A new motorway project near Louisville, Kentucky. Major works included two new bridges across the Ohio River; a short tunnel section; and reconstruction of interchange ramps.
Lagos Rail Mass Transit	Rapid transit, Commuter rail	Nigeria	Lagos	3.6	3.9	2009	2023 (Blue Line); 2024 (Red Line)		
Upgrades to Metro-North Railroad's Harmon Shop at Croton-on-Hudson	Improvements to a maintenance and operations hub	United States	Croton-on-Hudson, New York	1.1	1.16	2001	2024		
Milan Metro Line 4	Rapid transit	Italy	Milan	2.24	2.7	2014	2022 (Phase One); 2023 (Phase Two); 2024 (Phase Three)	Map of the M4 line	Roughly €1.9 billion as of April 2020.
Caltrain Modernization Program (CalMod)	Commuter rail	United States	San Francisco Bay Area	2.44	2.57	2017	2024		
Parramatta Light Rail, Stage 1	Light rail	Australia	Parramatta, New South Wales	1.94	2.04	2018	2024		
WestConnex	Tunnel (road)	Australia	Sydney	11.3	11.9	2015	2024		
Yaxi Expressway	Highway	China	Ya'an to Xichang	3.3	4.6	2007	2012		Unclear whether the $3.3 bn estimate was in 2007 dollars or 2012 dollars
Sydney Metro Northwest	Rapid transit	Australia	Sydney	5.2	6.5	2014	2019	Map of Sydney North Western Line and the City and South Western Line overlaid on top of the existing rail network	Extended south to the CBD in 2024 by Sydney Metro City & Southwest.
Cairo Metro Line 3, Phase 3	Rapid transit	Egypt	Cairo	2.6	3	2017	2024	Line 3 shown in green	Entire Line 3 costs more
Line 2 South Expansion	Light rail	Canada	Ottawa	3.5	3.6	2019	2024		4.72 billion CAD
Ho Chi Minh City Metro Line 1	Rapid transit	Vietnam	Ho Chi Minh City	2.5	2.5	2012	2024	Line 1 in red; remaining lines in planning stage or on hold	
Riyadh Metro	Rapid transit	Saudi Arabia	Riyadh	22.5 as of July 2013	31.2	2014	2024		There were disputes regarding at least $1 billion in 2022; as of January 2023, it is unclear if/how that affected the overall cost.
Qinghai–Tibet railway	Railway	China	Golmud to Lhasa	3.68	5.65	2001	2006		
Alaska Highway	Highway	United States, Canada	Dawson Creek to Delta Junction	0.13	2.03	1942	1942		
Chesapeake Bay Bridge–Tunnel	Bridge–tunnel	United States	Virginia	0.2	1.58	1960	1964		
Silver Line	Commuter rail	United States	Dallas	1.9	2.08	2020	2025		Also known as the "Cotton Belt Line"
K Line	Light rail	United States	Los Angeles	2.1	2.5	2014	2022 (first section); 2024 (rest of line)		
Trans-Amazonian Highway	Road	Brazil	North and Northeast Region of Brazil	1.5	8.7	1970	1972		
Great Carajás Project	Railway and Port	Brazil	Pará and Maranhão	2.9	5.2	1978	1986; 2018 (railway double-tracking)		
Intercounty Connector	Highway	United States	Maryland	2.4	3.3	2007	2014		
Line 6 Finch West	Light rail	Canada	Toronto	2.8	2.9	2016	2025		
Padma Bridge Rail Link Project	Rail	Bangladesh	Dhaka–Jessore	4.63	5.7	2018	2024	Padma Bridge	Part of Padma Bridge project.
Salesforce Transit Center	Transport hub	United States	San Francisco	2.32	2.93	2010	2018		
West Gate Tunnel	Tunnel (road)	Australia	Melbourne	7.4	7.8	2018	2025	The future location of an entrance to the West Gate Tunnel in Yarraville, Melbourne	
Gordie Howe International Bridge	Bridge (road)	Canada, United States	Windsor, Ontario to Detroit	4.6	4.7	2018	2026		
Metro Tunnel	Commuter rail tunnel	Australia	Melbourne	9.46	10.34	2015	2025	Map of the Metro Tunnel in blue and existing railway lines in grey	
Koralm Tunnel	Tunnel (rail)	Austria	Styria / Carinthia	6.2	7.6	2009	2025		
2 Line	Light rail line	United States	Eastside King County, Washington	3.7	3.9	2016	2026		
Valley Metro Rail: South Central Extension	Light rail	United States	Phoenix, Arizona	1.35	1.48	2019	2025		
Thessaloniki Metro	Rapid transit	Greece	Thessaloniki	3.24	4.3	2006	2024 (Line 1) 2026 (Line 2)		
City Rail Link	Commuter rail	New Zealand	Auckland	3.4		2015	2026		(NZD$5.5bn)

== Partially completed and open ==
Project	Description	Country	Location	Est. cost (in billions USD) at or near time of completion	Est. cost (in billions USD), adjusted for inflation	Start of construction	Year of completion	Image	Notes
Sydney Metro City & Southwest	Rapid transit	Australia	Sydney	14.5	15.3	2017	Completed 2024 (City) Expected Late 2025 (Southwest)		Extends Sydney Metro Northwest from Chatswood to Bankstown via the CBD
O-Train Line 1	Light rail	Canada	Ottawa	5.1	6.3	2013	Completed; 2019 (stage 1); Expected; 2026 (stage 2)		$2.1 billion + $4.66 billion CA$
Lusail Tram	Light rail	Qatar	Lusail	2.7 as of 2014	3.6	2016	Completed 2022 (First part of orange line) Expected Unclear timeline for rest of lines/stations		
Hyderabad Metro	Rapid transit	India	Hyderabad	2.4 as of November 2017	3.1	2012	Completed 2018 (First stretch) 2020 (Second stretch) Expected Unclear timeline for rest of lines/stations		
Sukhumvit Line	Rapid Transit	Thailand	Bangkok Metropolian Region			1994	Completed 1999 (Original Plan) 2011 (Bearing extension) 2017-19 (Samut Prakan extension) 2019-20 (Khu Khot extension) Expected TBA		
Silom Line	Rapid Transit	Thailand	Bangkok			1994	Completed 1999 (Original Plan) 2009 (Wongwian Yai extension) 2013 (Bang Wa extension) Expected TBA		
MRT Blue Line	Rapid Transit	Thailand	Bangkok		>2.2	1996	Completed 2004 (Original Plan) 2016-17 (Northern extension) 2019 (Southern extension) 2019-20 (Northern extension) Expected TBA		
MRT Purple Line	Rapid Transit	Thailand	Bangkok Metropolian Region		4.36	2012	Complete 2016 (Phase 1) Expected 2027 (All stations)		
SRT Light Red Line	Rapid Transit	Thailand	Bangkok Metropolian Region		1.47	2010	Completed 2021 (Taling Chan to Central Terminal(Phase I)) Expected Phase II - VI(Under construction and Planned)		
SRT Dark Red Line	Rapid Transit	Thailand	Bangkok Metropolian Region		3.18	2010	Completed 2021 (Rangsit-Bang Sue(Phase I)) Expected Phase II-V (Planned) Phase VI-VII (Suggested)		
Airport Rail Link	Airport Rail Link	Thailand	Bangkok Metropolian Region			2005	Completed 2010 (Phaya Thai-Suvarnabhumi Airport) Expected TBA		
Trans-Sumatra Toll Road	Highway	Indonesia	Sumatra	33.2	38.9	2014	Completed; Several segments at varying times (2019–2022); Expected; 2023, 2024 (Remaining segments)		
Skyline	Rapid transit	United States	Oʻahu	12.4	14.5	2011	Completed; 2023 (Phase 1) 2025 (Phase 2); Expected; 2031 (Phase 3)		
El Insurgente	Commuter rail	Mexico	State of Mexico; Mexico City	2.8	3.4	2015	Completed; 2023 (Zinacantepec to Lerma); 2024 (Lerma to Santa Fe); Expected; 2026 (Santa Fe to Observatorio)		
Kınalı-Balıkesir Motorway	Highway	Turkey	Tekirdağ to Balıkesir	2	2.6	2017	Completed; 2023 (Malkara-Lapseki); Expected; 2025 (remaining phases)		
A-1 motorway	Highway	Montenegro	Montenegro	3.7	4	2015	Completed; 2023 (first 43 km section) Expected; 2024 (Andrijevica segment)		(2.77 billion €)
Réseau express métropolitain	Light rail, Rapid transit	Canada	Montreal	5.5	6.4	2018	Completed; 2023 (first segment) 2025 (second segment); Expected; 2027		67 km of rails, 26 stations, automated light metro. Cost estimated in June 2021 to be CA$6.9 billion.
Tel Aviv Light Rail	Light rail	Israel	Tel Aviv	5.8	6.8	2011	Completed; 2023 (Red Line) Expected; 2028		NIS18.8 billion
Sichuan–Tibet railway	Railway	China	Chengdu to Lhasa	49.61	49.61	2014	Completed; 2018 Chengdu - Ya'an segment 2021 (Nyingchi–Lhasa segment) Expected; 2030 (Full line)		
North–South Railway	Railway	Brazil	National	2.6	2.7	1987	Completed; 1996 (Main section) Expected; TBD (Northern and Southern extensions)		
Line 5 Eglinton	Light rail	Canada	Toronto	10.26	11.2	2010	Completed; 2026 (Main section) Expected; 2031 (Western extension)		
D Line Extension	Rapid transit	United States	Greater Los Angeles	9.5	11.1	2014 (Section 1); 2018 (Section 2); 2021 (Section 3)	Completed; 2026 (Section 1) Expected; 2027 (Sections 2 and 3)		
Hokkaido Shinkansen	High-speed rail	Japan	Hokkaido	22.11	24	2005	Completed; 2016 (Aomori to Hokuto) Expected; 2039 (Hokuto to Sapporo)		Not counting cost of Seikan Tunnel

== Under construction ==
Project	Description	Country	Location	Approximate cost (in billions USD)	Start of construction	Planned year of completion	Image	Notes
North East Link	Tunnel (road)	Australia	Melbourne	17.5	2020	2028		
Sydney Metro Western Sydney Airport	Rapid transit	Australia	Sydney	8	2022	2027		
Western Harbour Tunnel	Tunnel (road)	Australia	Sydney	5	2021	2028		
Sydney Metro West	Rapid transit	Australia	Sydney	17	2020	2032	Sydney Metro West geotechnical survey locations	
Purple Line	Light rail	United States	Maryland suburbs of Washington, D.C.	3.4	2017 (halted in 2020); resumed in 2022	2027	Map showing the Purple Line's intersection points with the Washington Metro	
Red and Purple Modernization Phase One Project	Rapid transit	United States	Chicago	2.1	2019	2025		
Fehmarn Belt Fixed Link	Tunnel (undersea, rail/road)	Denmark, Germany	Fehmarn to Lolland	8.75	2019	2031		
Lagos-Kano Standard Gauge Railway	Railway	Nigeria	From Lagos to Kano	8.3	2011	TBA		
Badagry Deep Sea Port	Seaport	Nigeria	Badagry	2.3	2024	TBA		
Fourth Mainland Bridge	Bridge (road)	Nigeria	Across the lagoon to connect Ikorodu and Lekki	4.2	2024	TBA		
California High-Speed Rail	High-speed rail	United States	California	80.3	2015	2033 (Phase I)	Locations of planned California High-Speed Rail route. Phase I: black; Phase II: dark blue. (The separate Brightline West system is shown in light blue.) Route is approximate in some places.	
China Pakistan Economic Corridor	Economic corridor	Pakistan, China	(Pakistan) Gwadar to (China) Kashgar	65	2015	2030		
Barcelona Metro line 9	Rapid transit line	Spain	Barcelona	26.3	2009	2027		(€19bn)
Santiago Metro Line 7	Rapid transit line	Chile	Santiago	2.5	2022	2027	Map of the line	
Cross River Rail	Commuter rail tunnel	Australia	Brisbane	4.7	2017	2026		AUD $6.3 billion
Suburban Rail Loop East	Rapid transit	Australia	Melbourne	21.8-25	2022	2035	The map of the Suburban Rail Loop East (Lime Green) placed on top of the Victorian Train Map post Metro Tunnel along with SRL North and SRL West (Grey and Purple)	Part of the proposed orbital Suburban Rail Loop line
NHDP/ Bharatmala	Highway upgrade	India	India	207.6 (total) (NHDP: 53.2, 79.5 in 2023) (Bharatmala: 132.4)	2000	2018: (NHDP) 2026: Bharatmala Phase I Phase II was set to start in 2024, but now is uncertain	NH 47 between Coimbatore and Salem in Tamil Nadu, India.	(INR 4.5 trillion).This project was partially completed by 2018 and was then subsumed under the Bharatmala project.
Agua Negra Tunnel	Tunnel (road)	Argentina, Chile	San Juan, Argentina, & (Chile) Coquimbo Region	1.5	2018	2027		
Fastracks	Light rail, Commuter rail	United States	Denver	6.5	2006	2044		
Grand Paris Express	Rapid transit	France	Île-de-France (Paris region)	48	2016	2030		4 new lines, 200 km, 72 new stations
Scarborough Subway Extension	Rapid transit	Canada	Toronto	3	2022	2029–2030		CA$3.982 billion, 3 stops, 7.8 km
Tehran-Shomal Freeway, 121 km	Highway	Iran	Tehran Province and Mazandaran Province	1.7	1996	2024? (sections 1,2, & 4 are already complete)		(HUF 452bn)
Stuttgart 21	Railway & Urban Development	Germany	Stuttgart	16.4	2010	2031		€14.5 billion
Birmingham Northern Beltline (I-422)	Highway	United States	Birmingham, Alabama	5.4	2014	2047		
Brenner Base Tunnel	Tunnel (rail)	Austria, Italy	(Austria) Innsbruck to (Italy) Franzensfeste	11	2008	2032		
Semmering Base Tunnel	Tunnel (rail)	Austria	Lower Austria / Styria	4.6	2012	2030		(€3.9 bn)
Mumbai–Ahmedabad high-speed rail corridor	High-speed rail	India	From Ahmedabad to Mumbai	20	2019	2026 (partial), 2027 (complete)		(₹1.6 lakh crore)
Sagarmala	Seaport	India	Coastal areas of India	80.9	2017	2035		(₹6.5 lakh crore, only counting current projects)
High Speed 2	High-speed rail	United Kingdom	England	106.4	2017	TBA		330 mi/530 km of High Speed track, 5 stations and West Coast Mainline integration
Lower Thames Crossing	Tunnel (road)	United Kingdom	England	13.4	2026	'Early-to-mid 2030s'		Designed to relieve the heavily-congested Dartford Crossing. Main construction works scheduled to begin in 2028.
Bogotá Metro (line 1)	Rapid transit	Colombia	Bogotá	4.5	2020	2028		
Brussels Metro line 3	Rapid transit	Belgium	Brussels	1.86	2020	2030		
Chūō Shinkansen	High-speed rail, Maglev	Japan	Japan	64.35 as of May 2021	2014	2036		
Tel Aviv Metro	Rapid transit	Israel	Tel Aviv metro area	39.4	2025	2032		
Panama Metro Line 3	Rapid transit line (monorail)	Panama	Panama City	2.7154	2021	2027		The Panamanian balboa is tied to the United States dollar.
Millennium Line Broadway Extension ("Broadway Subway Project")	Rapid transit	Canada	Vancouver	2.35	2021	2026	Map showing the extension along Broadway in relation to existing lines and surface streets	Cost estimated in May 2021 to be 2,830,000,000 Canadian dollars; in roughly May 2021, that was roughly equivalent to 2,350,000,000 United States dollars.
Penn Station Access	Commuter rail	United States	New York City and Westchester County, New York	2.87	2022	2027		
South Coast Rail	Commuter rail	United States	Southeastern Massachusetts	3.42	2019	2030		
Bangkok–Nong Khai high-speed railway	High-speed rail	Thailand	Thailand	4.65	2020	2030		179 billion baht as of October 2022
MRT Orange Line	Rapid Transit	Thailand	Bangkok	3.9	2017	2027		
Oslo Metro Line T6	Rapid transit line	Norway	Oslo and Bærum	1.6	2020	2027		Cost is as of January 2017
Lima Metro Line 2	Rapid transit	Peru	Lima	5.8	2014	2025	Line 2 in yellow	
Line 4 (Athens Metro)	Rapid transit	Greece	Athens	1.9	2021	2032		€1.6 billion
São Paulo Metro, Line 6	Rapid transit	Brazil	Greater São Paulo	2.6	Resumed in 2020	2027		
Toulouse Metro, Line C	Rapid transit	France	Toulouse Métropole	3.65	2022	2028	Metro Line C shown in green	€3.4 billion as of February 7, 2023
Abidjan Metro	Rapid transit	Ivory Coast	Abidjan	1.46	2022	2028		€1.36 billion as of December 20, 2022
Vienna U-Bahn, U2xU5 Project	Rapid transit	Austria	Vienna	2.5	2018	2030	Map of metro after project concludes in 2030	
Xiong'an–Xinzhou high-speed railway	High-speed rail	China	Xiong'an–Xinzhou	8.86	2022	2027		
Tanzania Standard Gauge Railway	Railway	Tanzania	Tanzania	At least 7.6	2017	Unclear (does vary based on phase)		
Portal Bridge replacement	Bridge (rail)	United States	New Jersey	1.5	2022	2025 (first line of track)	Bridge to be replaced	
Rogfast	Tunnel (road)	Norway	Rogaland	2.91	2018	2033		
Belgrade Metro	Rapid transit	Serbia	Belgrade	5.35	2021	2028		
Ontario Line	Rapid transit	Canada	Toronto	34	2022	2031		16 km, 15 stop line with at-grade, elevated and underground sections operated with driverless trains.
São Paulo Metro Line 2 extension	Rapid transit	Brazil	São Paulo	1.4	2020	2026		
Hamburg U5	Rapid transit	Germany	Hamburg	1.75	2022	2030	U5 shown in red and purple	
Project Connect	Public transit (Note: This plan includes multiple light rail lines, a new commuter rail line, and multiple bus rapid transit routes.)	United States	Austin, Texas	10.3 for the light rail components; unclear for the rest	2021	Unclear		Measure approved by Austin voters. Construction of at least one bus rapid transit corridor has begun; light rail construction has not begun.
Hampton Roads Bridge–Tunnel Expansion Project	Bridge–tunnel (road)	United States	Hampton Roads (Virginia)	3.9	2020	2027		
Frederick Douglass Tunnel	Tunnel (rail)	United States	Baltimore	6	2023	2033		Replacement for old Baltimore and Potomac Tunnel)
Brightline West	High-speed rail	United States	California and Nevada	12	2024	2028	Brightline West in yellow	
Gateway Program	Rail improvements, including bridges and tunnels	United States	New York City to New Jersey (Hudson River)	16.1	2023	2035		
Lena Bridge	Bridge (road)	Russia	Sakha Republic	1.53	2024	2028	Site of future bridge	
Xinjiang–Tibet railway	Railway	China	Hotan to Lhasa	62.02	2025	2035		
Anadyr Highway	Road	Russia	Magadan to Chukotka	4.86	2012	2042		
Cross Island Line	Rapid transit	Singapore	Nationwide	29.52	2023	2030		
Transnordestina Railway	Railway	Brazil	Northeast Region of Brazil	2.8	2006	2029 (proj.)		
West–East Integration Railway	Railway	Brazil	Bahia and Tocantins	1.0	2011	2027 (proj.)		
Gotthard Road Tunnel second bore	Tunnel (road)	Switzerland	Uri and Ticino	2.4	2021	2032		Project includes refurbishment of the existing tunnel.
Second Avenue Subway, Phase 2	Rapid transit	United States	New York City	6.39	2026	2032		

== Suspended or abandoned ==
Project	Description	Country	Location	Status (suspended or abandoned)	Approximate cost (in billions USD) and year of cost estimate	Start of construction	Year suspended	Image	Notes
Northern Latitudinal Railway	Railway	Russia	Labytnangi (Obskaya) - Korotchaevo	Suspended	3.03 (2018)	2018	2022		
Lavalin Skytrain	Rapid Transit	Thailand	Bangkok	Abandoned	-	-	-		Abandoned before construction
Hopewell Project	Rapid Transit	Thailand	Bangkok	Abandoned	3.2 (1990)	1990	1998		Some pillars can still be found in Bangkok
Staten Island Tunnel	Rapid Transit tunnel	United States	New York City	Abandoned	0.06 (1922)	1923	1925		
Access to the Region's Core	Commuter rail	United States	New York City and New Jersey	Abandoned	8.7 (2009)	2009	2010		
Eglinton West line	Rapid Transit	Canada	Toronto	Abandoned	0.74 (1994)	1994	1995		

== Proposed ==
Project	Description	Location	Approximate cost (in billions USD)	Proposed start of construction	Proposed year of completion	Notes
Great Istanbul Tunnel	Railway, Undersea tunnel	Istanbul, Turkey	4.34	TBD	TBD	After Marmaray and Eurasia Tunnels, it will be the third tunnel to connect Istanbul's sides.
HızRay	Railway, Undersea tunnel	Istanbul, Turkey	TBD	TBD	TBD	High-speed subway line including a fourth Bosphorus tunnel to connect Istanbul's sides along with the Great Tunnel.
Arctic Railway	Railway	Finland, Norway	3.43	TBD	TBD	A connecting line between Kirkenes port and the Finnish railway network.
Bridge of the Horns	Bridge (rail/road)	Djibouti, Yemen	20	TBD	TBD	A bridge across the Red Sea.
Crossrail 2	Railway, Commuter rail, Rapid transit	Greater London, United Kingdom	49.4	2023	2030s	A new railway line in England, serving London, Surrey & Hertfordshire to interlink with Crossrail (above).
Helsinki City Rail Loop	Commuter Rail	Finland	1.77	TBD	TBD	An underground rail loop in Helsinki.
Helsinki–Tallinn Tunnel	Railway, Undersea tunnel	Finland, Estonia	17.74	TBD	TBD	
Hordfast	Bridge (road)	Norway	2	TBD	TBD	
Irish Sea Bridge	Bridge (rail/road)	United Kingdom	20.55	TBD	TBD	A proposed bridge between Scotland and Northern Ireland, supported by the Johnson ministry.
Lentorata	Railway tunnel	Finland	6.16	2030	TBD	An airport rail link for Helsinki Airport.
Malacca Strait Bridge	Bridge (road)	Indonesia, Malaysia	14	TBD	TBD	A proposed 48 kilometer bridge over the Strait of Malacca.
MetroLink (Dublin)	Rapid transit	(Republic of Ireland) Greater Dublin Area, Ireland	10	2025	2031–2034	
MRT Silver Line	Rapid Transit	Thailand	2.75	TBD	2029	
MRT Brown Line	Rapid Transit	Thailand	1.52	TBD	2029	
MRL Grey Line	Rapid Transit	Thailand	0.82	TBD	TBD	
MRL Light Blue Line	Rapid Transit	Thailand	0.45	TBD	TBD	
Don Mueang-Suvarnabhumi-U-Tapao high-speed railway	High-speed rail	Thailand	6.8	TBD	2029	
Saudi–Egypt Causeway	Causeway	Saudi Arabia, Egypt	4	TBD	TBD	
Strait of Messina Bridge	Bridge (rail/road)	Italy	6.6	TBD	TBD	
Sunda Strait Bridge	Bridge (rail/road)	Indonesia	18.87	TBD	TBD	The project has been indefinitely postponed.
Singapore Strait crossing	Tunnel (undersea)	Singapore, Indonesia	TBD		TBD	A proposed tunnel between Singapore and Indonesia.
Qatar–Bahrain Causeway	Causeway	Qatar, Bahrain	5	TBD	TBD	
Texas Central Railway	High-speed rail	Texas, United States	5.9	TBD	TBD	Would operate between Dallas and Houston, with a stop in the Brazos Valley region
LinkUS	Rapid transit	Columbus, Ohio, United States	8.74	2024	2030	Cost includes three rapid-transit corridors set to open by 2030, and two more by 2050.
Interborough Express	Light rail	New York City, United States	5.5 (in 2027 dollars)	TBD	TBD	New light rail line, built largely along existing tracks, connecting Brooklyn and Queens. Still in planning stages.
Rio de Janeiro Light Rail Expansion	Light rail	Rio de Janeiro, Brazil	3	2023	2025 (at least first sections)	Would add 145.5 km (90.4 mi) to existing light rail network
Bagamoyo Port	Seaport	Bagamoyo, Tanzania	10	2023		
Valparaíso–Santiago rail replacement	Railway	Valparaíso and Santiago, Chile	1.32	2025	2030	
D2 Subway	Light rail	Dallas, United States	1.7-1.9	TBD	2028	
City Centre–Māngere Line	Light rail	New Zealand	8.7	TBD	TBD	In the detailed planning phase. Would connect Auckland Airport to the CBD, terminating at Wynyard Quarter
Interstate Bridge Replacement	Bridge (road/light rail)	Portland and Vancouver, United States	5-7.5	2026	2033	Replacement of existing bridge over Columbia River, also carrying light rail extension to Vancouver, Washington
Taiwan Strait Tunnel	Railway, Undersea tunnel	China, Taiwan	64.56	TBD	TBD	
Chesapeake Bay Bridge Replacement	Bridge (road)	Maryland, United States	7	2032	TBD	Replacement of existing bridges crossing the Chesapeake Bay
Strait of Gibraltar Tunnel	Tunnel (rail)	Spain, Morocco	9.2	2030	2040	Rail tunnel under Strait of Gibraltar, currently in planning phase
North–South express railway	High-speed rail	Vietnam	67	2026	2035	High-speed rail from Hanoi to Ho Chi Minh City
Sepulveda Transit Corridor	Rapid transit	Los Angeles, United States	24.2	TBD	2035	
Francis Scott Key Bridge replacement	Bridge (road)	Baltimore, United States	5.2	TBD	2030	Replacement for destroyed original bridge
Saudi Landbridge Project	Railway	Saudi Arabia	7	TBD	2030	Rail link from Jeddah to Riyadh
Northern Powerhouse Rail	High-speed rail & Urban renewal	United Kingdom	39	TBD	TBD	
K Line Northern Extension	Light rail	Los Angeles, United States	15	TBD	TBD	

== Airport projects ==
Airport	Primary market(s) served	Country	IATA Code	Type of project	Passengers (total)	Year completed	Est. cost (in billions USD) at or near time of completion	Est. cost (in billions USD), adjusted for inflation
Abu Dhabi International Airport	Abu Dhabi	United Arab Emirates	AUH	New airport	20,000,000	1982	6.8	19.2
Adolfo Suarez Madrid-Barajas International Airport Terminals 4 and 4S	Madrid	Spain	MAD	New terminals	57,891,340	2006	8.7	13.3
Al Maktoum International Airport	Dubai	United Arab Emirates	DWC	New airport	410,278 (expected: 260 million)	2010	32	46
Athens International Airport	Athens	Greece	ATH	New airport	16,225,885	2001	3	5.2
Auckland Airport	Auckland	New Zealand	AKL	New terminal, new runway		2028-2029 (expected)	2.4	
Bahrain International Airport expansion	Bahrain	Bahrain	BAH	New terminal		2021	1.1	1.3
Beijing Capital International Airport Terminal 3	Beijing	China	PEK	New terminal	50,000,000	2008	3.8	5.6
Beijing Daxing International Airport	Beijing	China	PKX	New airport	25,051,012	2019	17	21.5
Berlin Brandenburg Airport	Berlin	Germany	BER	New airport	28,000,000 (expected)	2020	10 (as of 2018)	
Central Transport Hub	Warsaw	Poland	N/A		≈45,000,000 (expected)	2027 (expected)	4.2-5.0 (expected, without rail component and road component)	
Changi Airport Terminal 3	Singapore	Singapore	SIN	New terminal	22,000,000	2008	1.4	2.1
Changi Airport Terminal 4	Singapore	Singapore	SIN	New terminal	65,628,000	2017	1	
Charles de Gaulle Airport	Paris	France	CDG	New airport	26,196,575 as of 2021	1973	0.27	1.5
Chengdu Tianfu International Airport	Chengdu	China	TFU	New airport	4,354,758 as of 2021	2021	10.8	12.6
Chennai greenfield airport, Parandur	Chennai	India	N/A	New airport	100,000,000 (expected)	Unclear	2.5 (₹20,000 crore)	
Ciudad Real Central Airport	Ciudad Real	Spain	CQM	New airport	Ceased operations in 2012 (expected: 10 million)	2009	1.41	
Comodoro Arturo Merino Benítez International Airport: International Terminal	Santiago	Chile	SCL	New terminal	30,000,000	2022	0.99	
Dallas Fort Worth International Airport	Dallas–Fort Worth metroplex	United States	DFW	New airport	62,465,756 as of 2021	1973	0.7	3.9
Dallas Fort Worth International Airport Terminal F; overhaul	Dallas–Fort Worth metroplex	United States	DFW	New terminal; terminal expansion; renovations		2028 or 2033 (expected)	4.8	
Denver International Airport	Denver	United States	DEN	New airport	50,167,485	1995	4.8	9.3
Don Mueang International Aitport	Bangkok	Thailand	DMK	New airport		1914	1	
Dubai International Airport Terminal 3	Dubai	United Arab Emirates	DXB	New terminal		2008	4.5	6.6
Felipe Ángeles International Airport	Mexico City	Mexico	NLU	New airport		2022	3.68	
George Bush Intercontinental Airport, international terminal construction	Houston	United States	IAH	Terminal redevelopment and/or expansion		Unclear	1.2 (as of October 2019)	
Guangzhou Baiyun International Airport	Guangzhou	China	CAN	New airport	59,732,147	2004	2.39	3.9
Hamad International Airport	Doha	Qatar	DOH	New airport		2014	15.5	20.7
Harry Reid International Airport (then McCarran International Airport), Terminal 3	Las Vegas	United States	LAS	New terminal		2012	2.4	3.3
Hazrat Shahjalal International Airport Terminal 3	Dhaka	Bangladesh	DAC	New terminal	Additional 12,000,000 (expected)	2025–2026 (expected)	2.53 (as of 2019)	
Hong Kong International Airport	Hong Kong		HKG	New airport	70,502,000	1998	20	36.8
Heathrow Airport Terminal 5	London	United Kingdom	LHR	New terminal	32,100,000 as of 2018	2008	7.9	11.6
Incheon International Airport	Seoul	South Korea	ICN	New airport	28,677,161	2001 (Phase 1) 2008 (Phase 2) 2017 (Phase 3)	5 (Phase 1) 2.6 (Phase 2) 3.54 (Phase 3)	8.7 (Phase 1) 3.8 (Phase 2) 4.6 (Phase 3)
Istanbul Airport	Istanbul	Turkey	IST	New airport	76,236,980	2018	29 (including side projects)	36.6
John F. Kennedy International Airport, (New) Terminal One	New York City	United States	JFK	New terminal		Expected: 2026 (Phase 1) 2030 (Full completion)	9.5	
John F. Kennedy International Airport, (New) Terminal 6	New York City	United States	JFK	New terminal		Expected: 2026 (Phase 1) 2028 (Full completion)	4.2 (Phase 1)	
Kansai International Airport	Osaka	Japan	KIX	New airport	27,987,564	1994	20 (as of 2008)	29.3 (starting inflation calculation in 2008)
Kansas City International Airport	Kansas City	United States	MCI	New terminal (replacement)		2023	1.5	
Kertajati International Airport	Majalengka Regency	Indonesia	KJT	New airport	29,000,000 (expected)	2018	15	18.9
King Abdulaziz International Airport	Jeddah	Saudi Arabia	JED	New airport	18,000,000	1981	7.2	
King Shaka International Airport	Durban	South Africa	DUR	New airport	7,500,000	2010	1	1.4
Kuala Lumpur International Airport	Kuala Lumpur	Malaysia	KUL	New airport	52,643,511	1998	3.5	
Kualanamu International Airport	Medan	Indonesia	KNO	New airport	12,245,116	2013	4.4	
Kuwait International Airport, Terminal 2	Kuwait City	Kuwait	KWI	New terminal	25,000,000 additional passengers (estimated)	2026 (expected)	5	
LaGuardia Airport	New York City	United States	LGA	Renovation	15,601,063	2025 (expected)	8	
Long Thanh International Airport	Ho Chi Minh City	Vietnam	N/A	New airport	100,000,000 (expected)	2025 (expected)	10	
Los Angeles International Airport	Los Angeles	United States	LAX	Renovation and expansion			14	
Louis Armstrong New Orleans International Airport (new terminal)	New Orleans	United States	MSY	New terminal		2019	1.3	1.6
Manchester Airport Transformation Programme	Manchester	United Kingdom	MAN	New terminal		2025 (expected)	1.6 (equivalent to £1.3 billion as of February 2023)	
Munich Airport	Munich	Germany	MUC	New airport		1992	5.17	10.64
Nashville International Airport, BNA Vision	Nashville, Tennessee	United States	BNA	Airport overhaul (Note: The project includes terminal lobby renovation, an international arrivals facility (including six new international gates and a new Customs and Border Protection area), a new tarmac terminal apron and taxilane expansion, an on-airport hotel and corresponding garage, a satellite concourse, the creation of Concourse D, multiple new terminal garages, and roadway updates to accommodate the changes.)		2024	1.5	
Nashville International Airport, New Horizon	Nashville, Tennessee	United States	BNA	Terminal expansion; other improvements (Note: The project includes expanding multiple concourses, as well as constructing a new air freight building, making terminal roadway improvements, and making baggage system handling improvements.)		2028 (expected)	1.4	
Navi Mumbai International Airport	Mumbai	India	NMU	New airport	60,000,000 (expected)	2025 (expected)	2	
New Islamabad International Airport	Islamabad	Pakistan	IBD	New airport	5,140,585	2018	3.91	4.9
New Lisbon Airport	Lisbon	Portugal	N/A		50,000,000 (expected)	2035 (expected)	4.5	
New Mexico City International Airport	Mexico City	Mexico			Ceased operations in 2018 (expected: 125 million)	2018	13	
Newark Liberty International Airport Terminal A	Newark, New Jersey; New York City	United States	EWR	Terminal replacement		2023	2.7	
Newark Liberty International Airport Terminal C	Newark, New Jersey; New York City	United States	EWR	Terminal renovation and expansion	33,399,207	2003	1.2	2
O'Hare International Airport	Chicago	United States	ORD	Expansion		2028 (expected)	8.7 (as of March 2019)	
Orlando International Airport, Terminal C	Orlando, Florida	United States	MCO	New terminal		2022	2.8	
Salt Lake City International Airport	Salt Lake City	United States	SLC	Renovation and expansion		2024 (expected)	4.1 (as of January 2020)	
Shenzhen Bao'an International Airport, replacement terminal	Shenzhen	China	SZX	Terminal replacement		2013	1.4	1.9
Shenzhen Bao'an International Airport, third runway	Shenzhen	China	SZX	New runway		2025 (expected)	1.76	
Suvarnabhumi Airport	Bangkok	Thailand	BKK	New airport	55,892,428	2006	3.8	5
Taoyuan International Airport Terminal 3	Taipei	Taiwan	TPE	New terminal		First stage: 2024 (expected)	3.13 (as of November 2022)	
Western Sydney Airport	Sydney	Australia	WSI (provisional)	New airport	10,000,000 (initially) 82,000,000 (by 2036)	2026 (expected)	3.3	
Jorge Chávez International Airport	Callao	Peru	LIM	New terminal and runway		2025 (expected)	2	
Hazrat Shahjalal International Airport Terminal 3	Dhaka	Bangladesh	DAC	New terminal		2019	2.3	

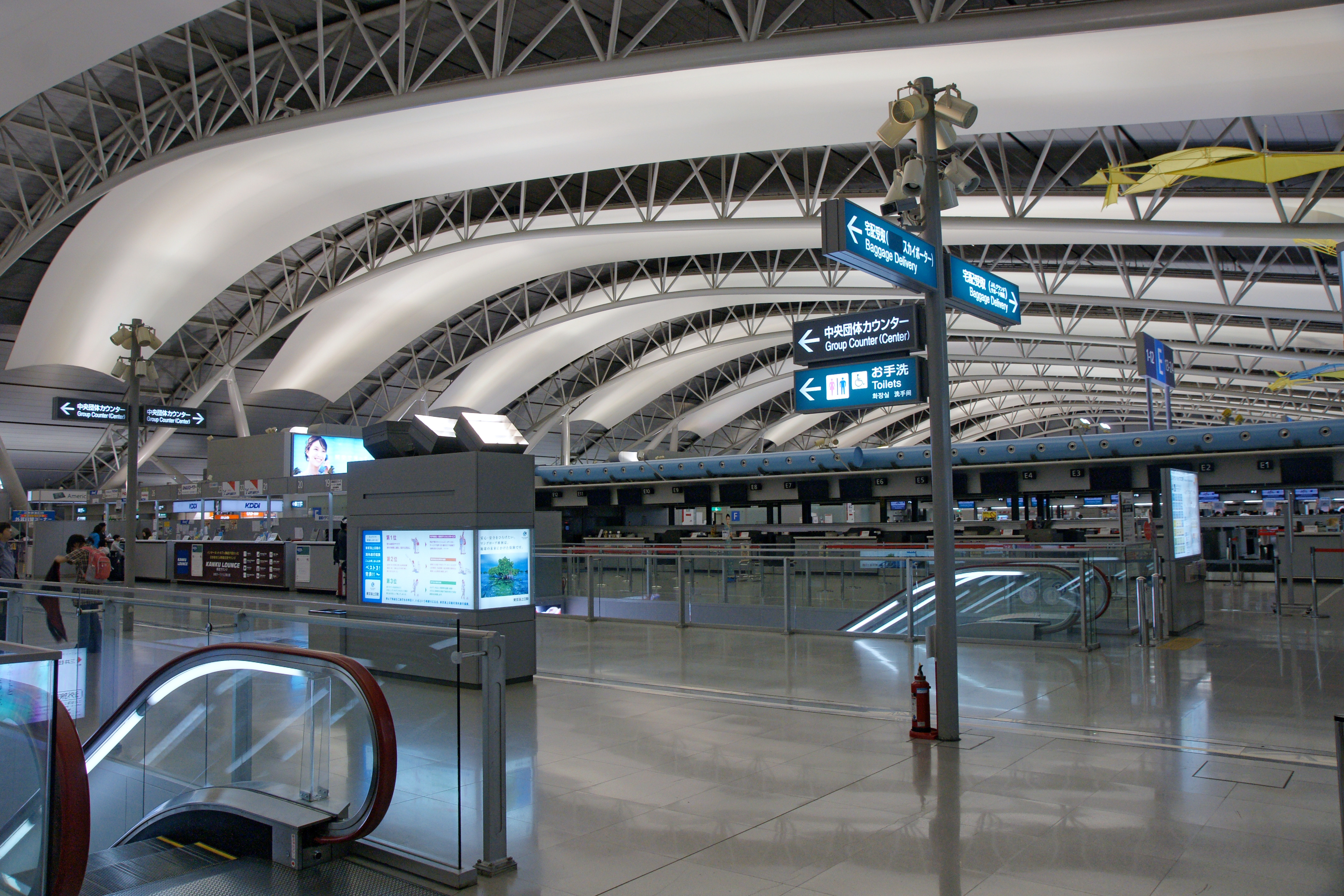
Kansai International Airport

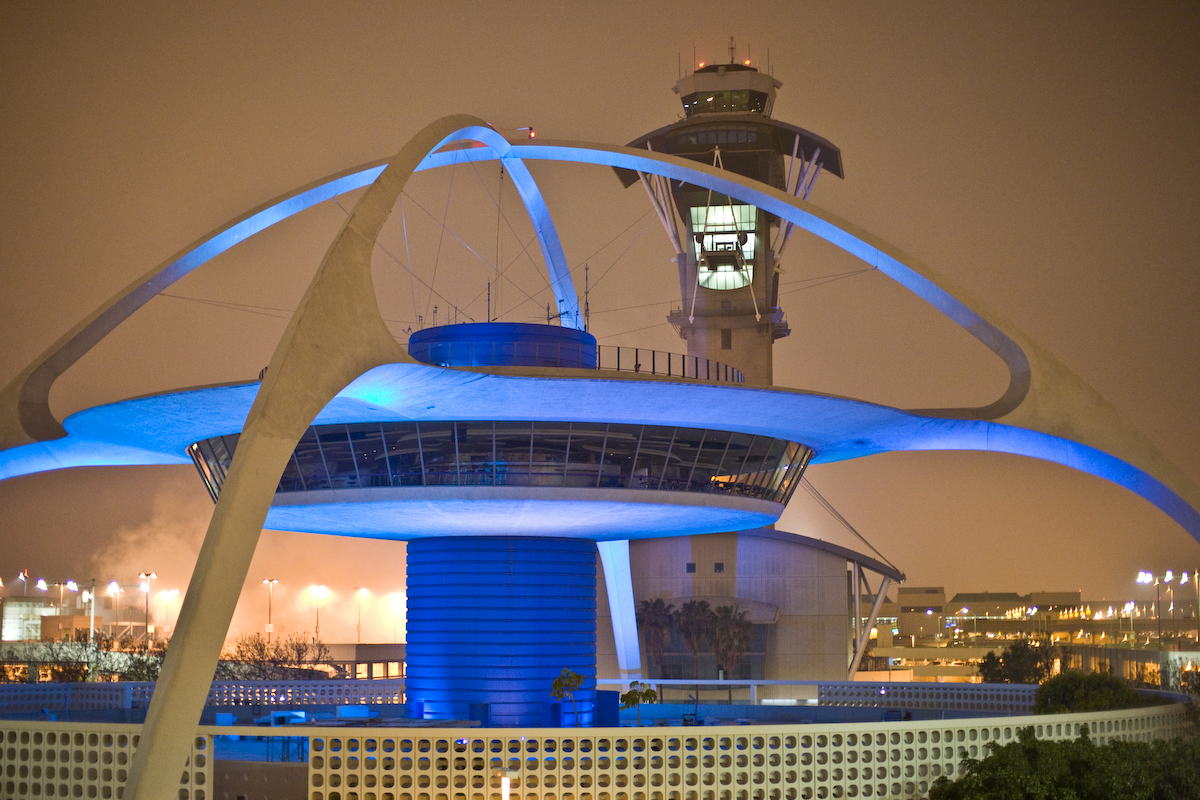
Los Angeles International Airport

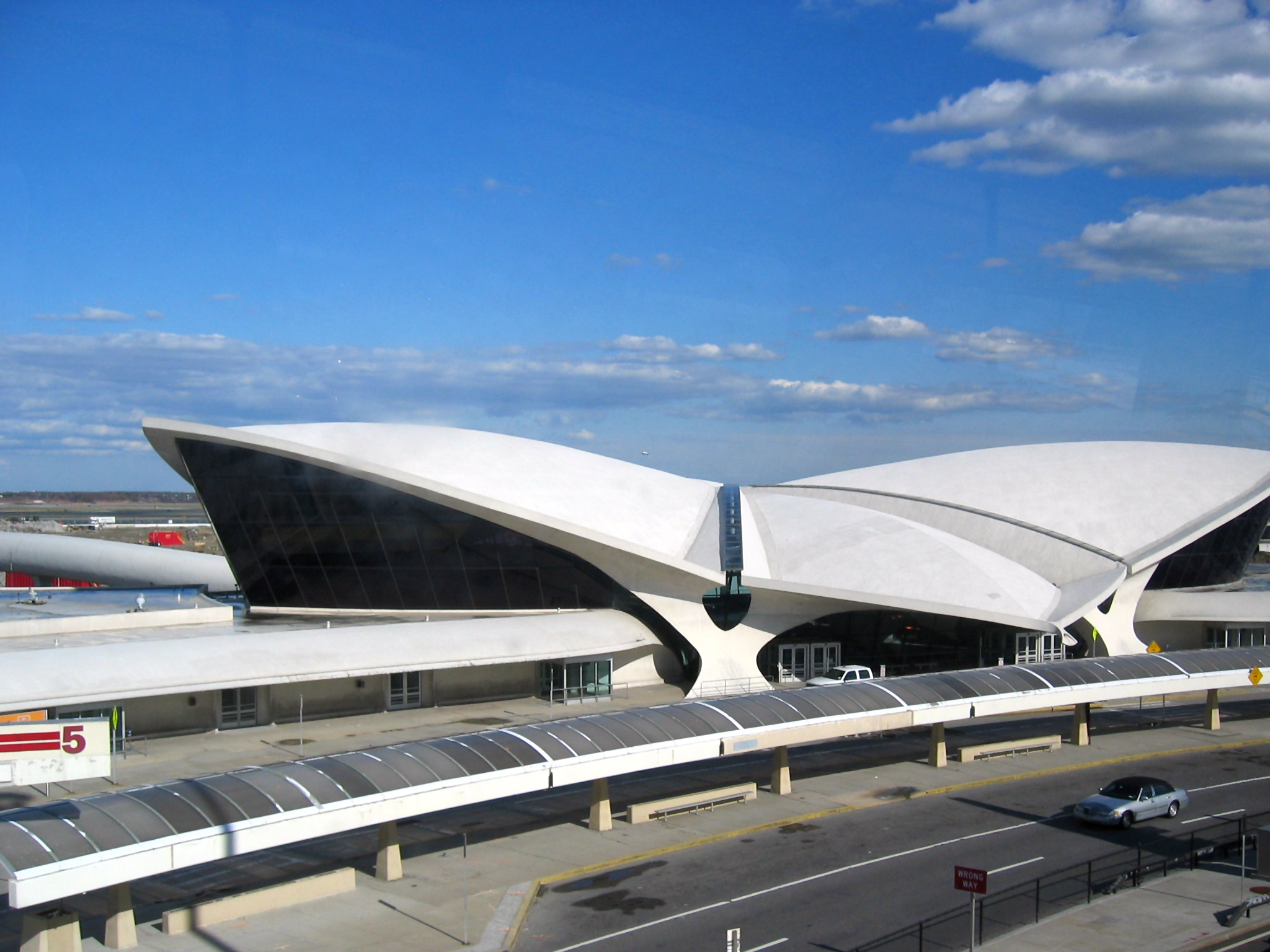
John F. Kennedy Airport

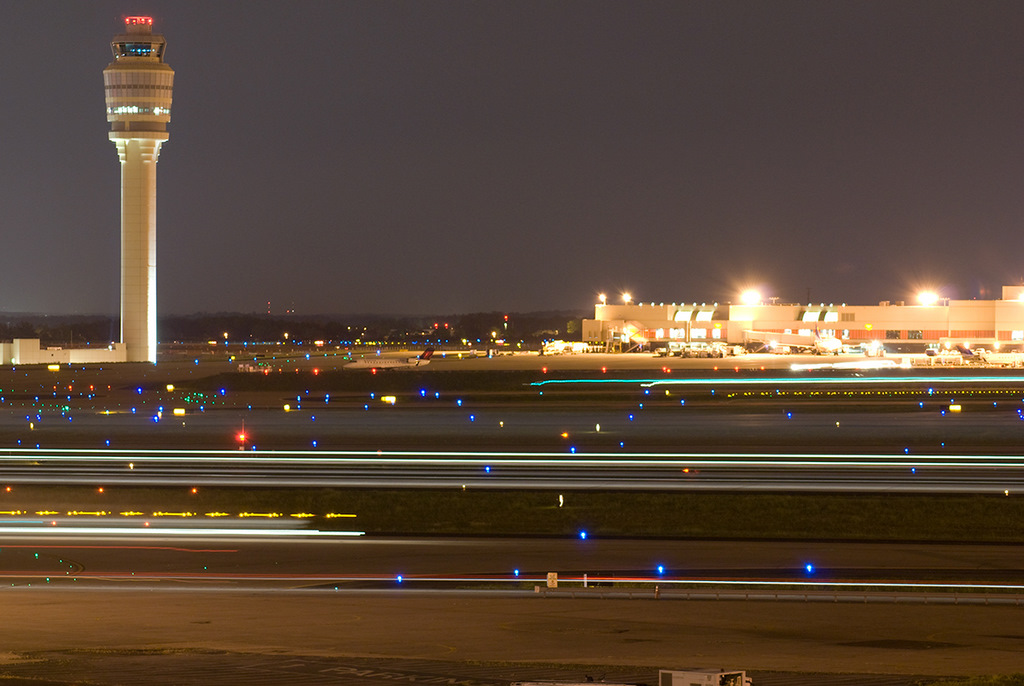
Hartsfield-Jackson Airport, the busiest in the world.

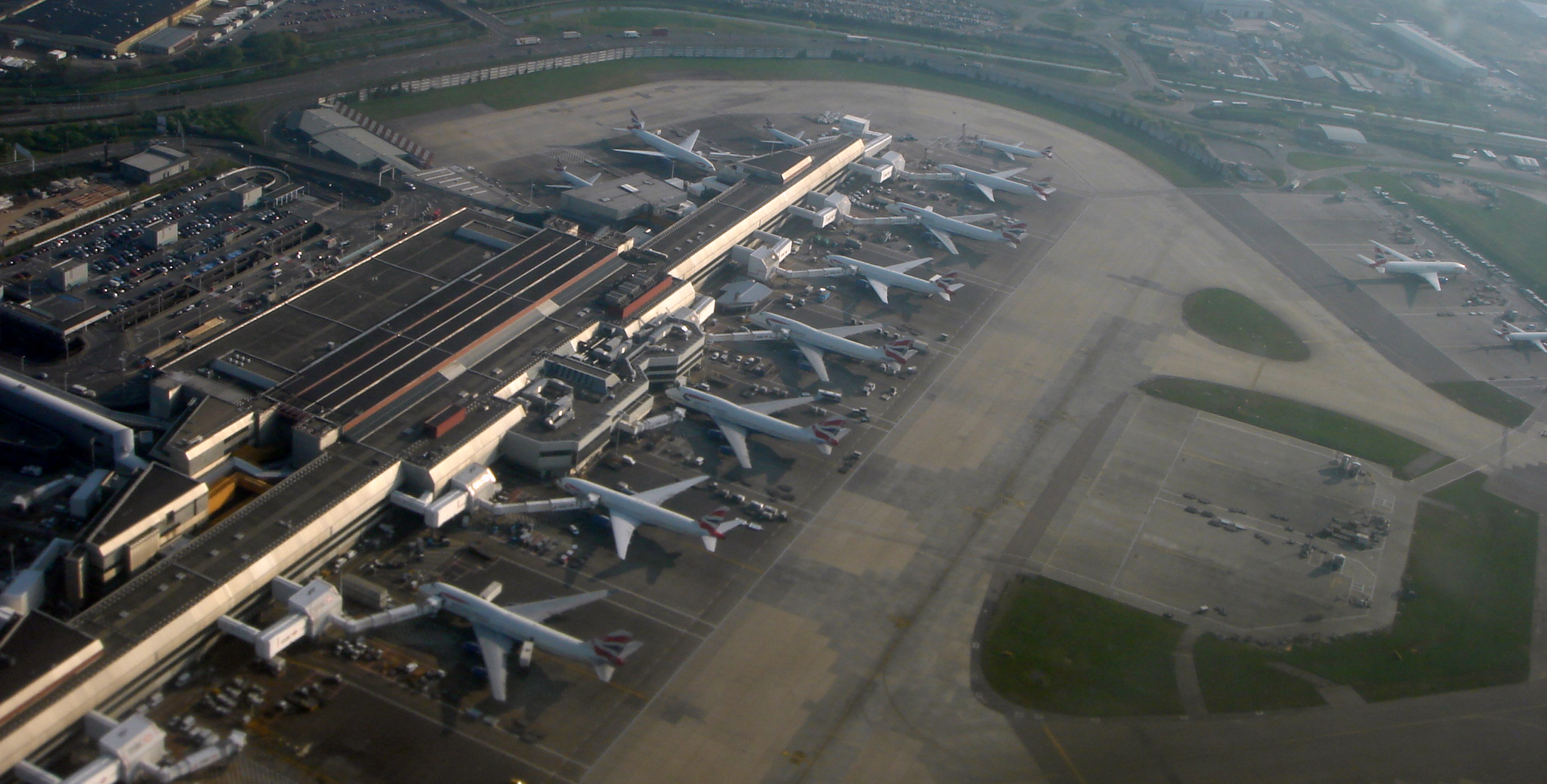
Heathrow Airport, London

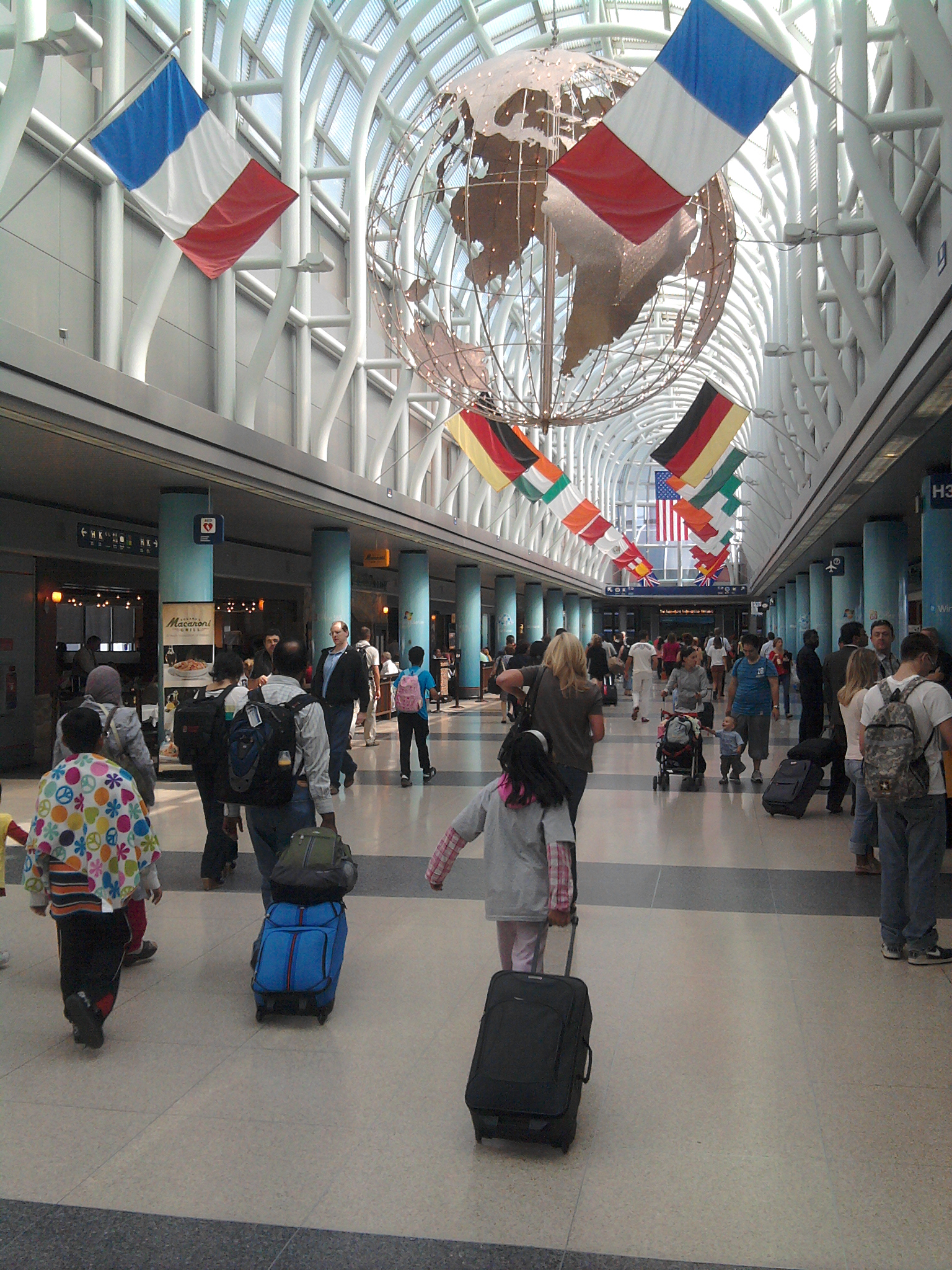
O'Hare Airport

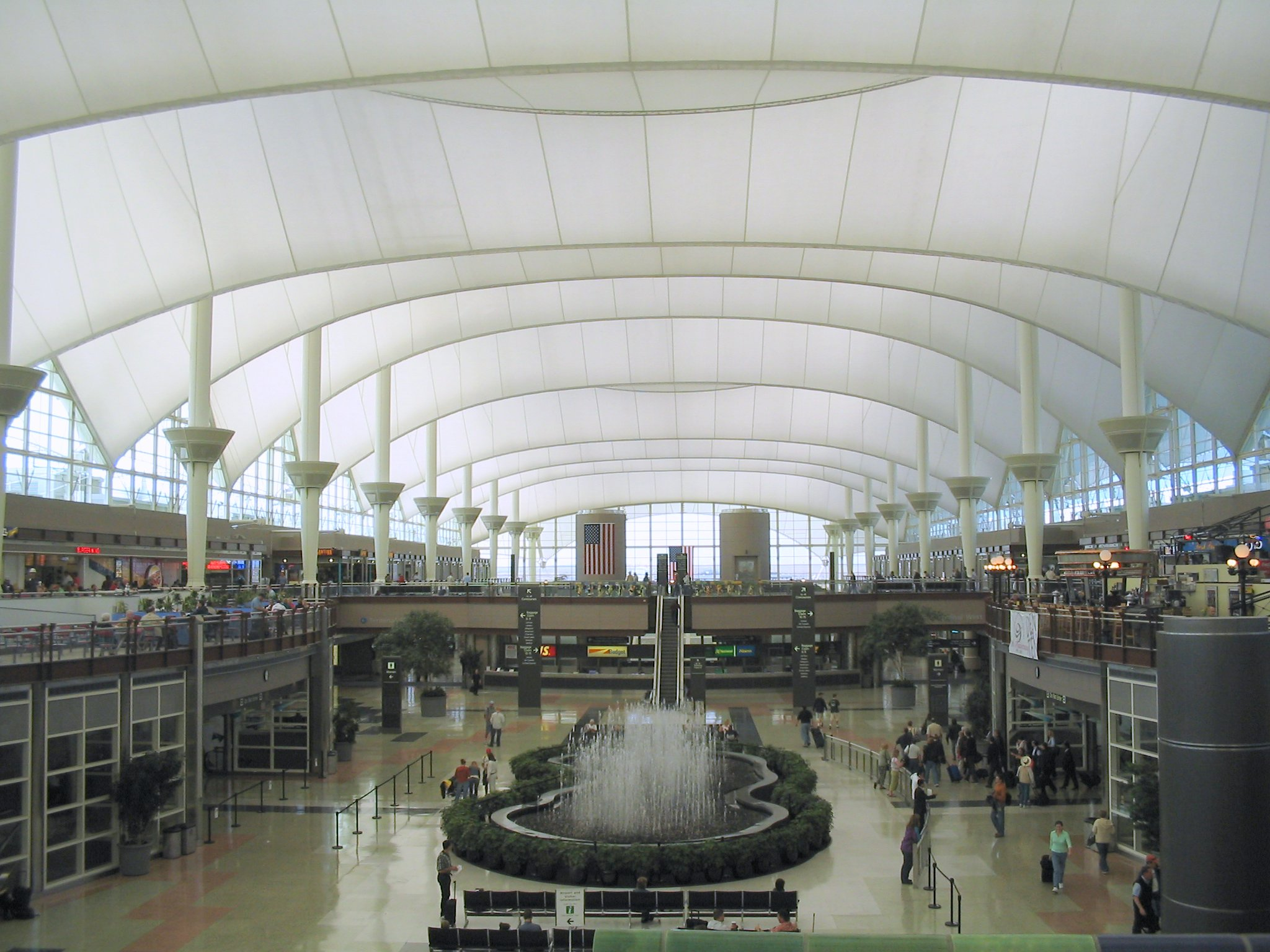
Denver International Airport

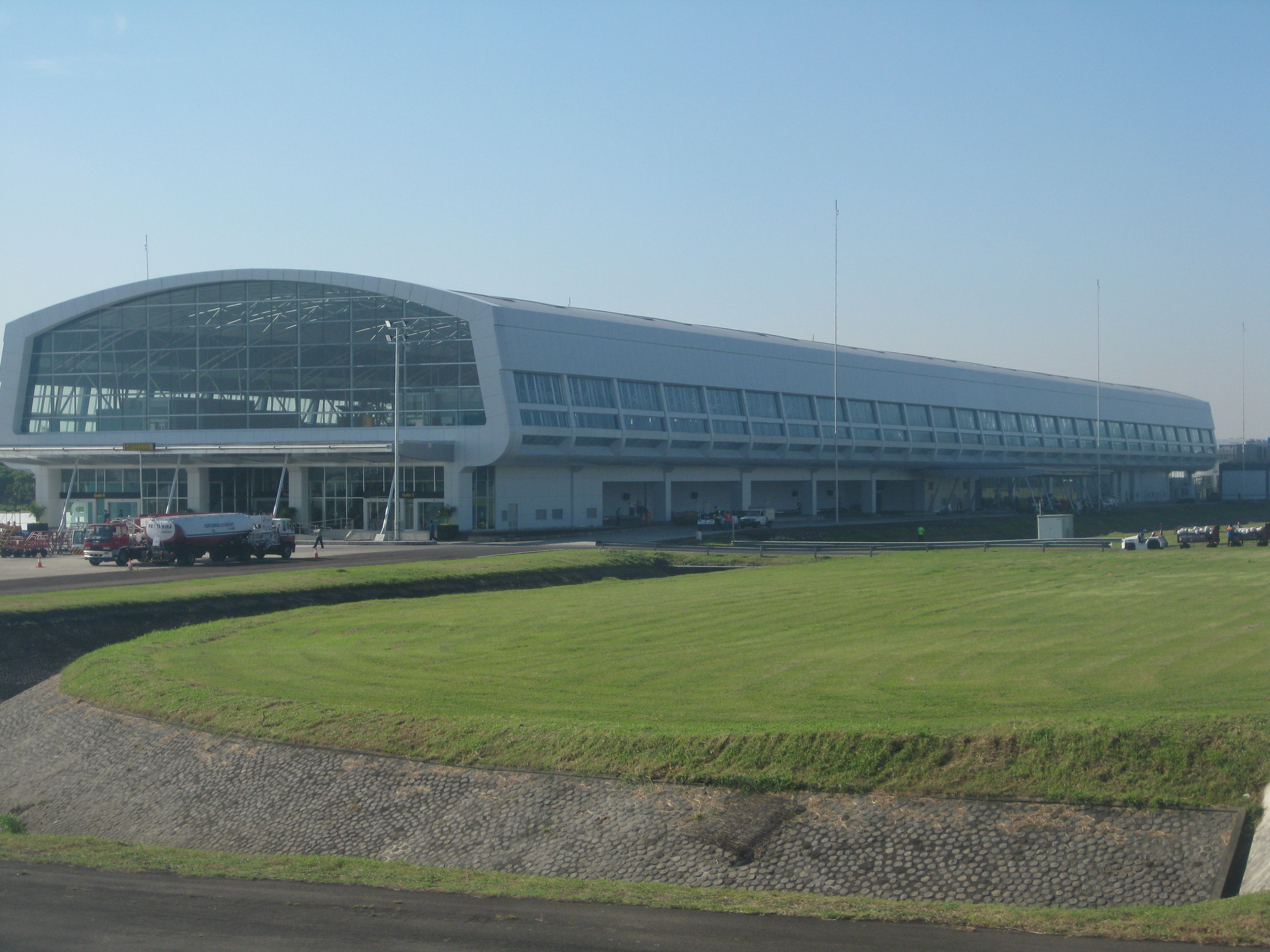
Terminal 3 at Soekarno-Hatta International Airport
