= Ngari Networking Project =

Chinese energy infrastructure project

The Ngari Networking Project (Chinese: 阿里联网工程), or HVDC Ngari, sometimes referred to as the Ngari-Central Tibet Grid Networking Project, is a 500 kV transmission and substation initiative that commenced operations on December 4, 2020.

== Project Chronology ==
The Ngari Networking Project, with a maximum altitude of 5,357 meters and an average altitude of 4,572 meters, presents an exceptionally harsh construction environment and perilous road conditions, rendering it the highest, most challenging, and most arduous 500 kV power transmission and substation project globally.

The project entails a total expenditure of 7.4 billion yuan, with building scheduled to commence in September 2019. The project commences at the Doling 220 kV substation in Samzhubzê, Shigatse City, and concludes at the 220 kV Barr substation in Gar County, Ngari Prefecture. It traverses 10 districts and counties across 2 prefectures and cities in Tibet, incorporating 6 new 500 kV and 220 kV substations, with an overall transmission line length of 1,689 kilometers. This is the fourth power transmission and transformation project in Tibet, following the Qinghai-Tibet, Sichuan-Tibet, and Central Tibet Networking Projects. The commissioning of the Ngari Power Interconnection Project concludes the era of isolated grid operation in the Ngari region, signifying the establishment of a cohesive 500 kV power grid at the subnational level in mainland China. Consequently, Tibet has entered a new phase of a unified power grid encompassing 7 cities and 74 counties (districts) in the area, which has significantly bolstered Tibet's energy development potential and economic growth capacity.
