= Central Tibet Networking Project =

Chinese energy infrastructure project

The Central Tibet Networking Project (Chinese: 藏中联网工程), or HVDC Central Tibet, encompasses the Central Tibet and Chamdo Grid Networking Project, along with the power supply initiative for the Lhasa to Nyingchi segment of the Sichuan–Tibet railway, commencing in Markam County of Chamdo City and concluding in Sangri County of Shannan, traversing ten districts and counties across three cities and regions. The project's overall investment amounts to around 16.2 billion RMB, encompassing 16 new and expanded substations of 110kV and above, along with 2,738 kilometers of new lines of 110kV and above. It finalized and was operational by 2018. The Central Tibet Networking Project integrates nearly 80,000 individuals from the Bomê County, Zayu County, and Mêdog County onto the primary grid, achieving comprehensive coverage of the main electricity grid in Nyingchi.

== Project History ==
In 2011 and 2014, Tibet finalized the Qinghai-Tibet Networking Project and the Sichuan-Tibet Networking Project, respectively, effectively addressing the power deficiency in central and eastern Tibet; however, the backbone network infrastructure of Tibet remained unconnected throughout the entire region.

In November 2018, the Central Tibet connectivity Project was finalized and integrated into the grid, achieving the connectivity of the Qinghai-Tibet Interconnection Project and the Sichuan-Tibet Interconnection Project. The completion of the central Tibet interconnection project signifies the preliminary establishment of the primary framework for the 500 kV grid in Tibet, ushering the Tibet power grid into the ultra-high voltage era. The Central Tibet Networking Project facilitates long-term access to a railroad traction station and effectively ensures the power supply requirements for the Sichuan–Tibet railway and Yunnan-Tibet railway.

This Project in the Tibet Autonomous Region was awarded the 2021 FIDIC Engineering Project Excellence Award.

== See also ==
- Qinghai-Tibet Networking Project
- Sichuan-Tibet Networking Project
- Ngari Networking Project
