= Lhasa Converter Station =

Converter station in Tibet, China

Coordinates: 29°52′39″N 91°11′44″E

Lhasa Converter Station (Chinese: 拉萨换流站, 拉萨±400千伏换流站) is the first ±400 kV converter station designed for high-altitude and cold-climate conditions. It is the largest of its kind, situated in Langtang Village, Lhünzhub County, Lhasa City, at an altitude of 3,825 meters. The station officially began operations on December 9, 2011, marking a significant milestone in addressing the power supply challenges faced by the Tibetan power grid at the time.

== History ==
The primary construction work was carried out by Hubei Power Transmission and Transformation Engineering Company (Chinese: 湖北省输变电工程公司), with construction commencing in September 2010. By October 2011, the Pole I and Pole II converters at the Lhasa Converter Station were successfully energized in a single attempt, marking the beginning of the system commissioning phase for the station.

Between 2011 and 2021, the Lhasa Converter Station achieved remarkable progress, evolving from a modest starting point to a major power hub. It transitioned from dependency on external assistance to fully independent operations and inspections. The station's transmission capacity grew from an initial 135 MW in 2011 to reaching full-load operation at 600 MW on December 15, 2018. The Lhasa Converter Station has been pivotal in resolving power shortages in winter and addressing electricity demands during summer in Tibet. By 2021, the station had transmitted a total of 5.894 billion kWh of electricity to the Golmud Converter Station, which is equivalent to replacing approximately 19 million tons of standard coal. Meanwhile, it had received 8.391 billion kWh of electricity from Golmud. This energy exchange has substantially contributed to the economic and ecological development of both the Qinghai-Tibet region, enhancing livelihoods and promoting sustainable growth.

On April 10, 2024, the State Council of the People's Republic of China officially approved the Qinghai-Tibet DC Phase II Expansion Project, which primarily involves expanding the Golmud Converter Station in Qinghai and the Lhasa Converter Station in Tibet. The project carries a total investment of RMB 2.603 billion, with RMB 1.301 billion allocated from the central budget, covering approximately 50% of the total cost. The project is expected to be fully completed and operational by 2025. Once in operation, the transmission capacity of the Qinghai-Tibet DC system will double from 600,000 kilowatts to 1.2 million kilowatts.

== See also ==
- List of HVDC projects
- Lhasa 500kV Transmission Project
- Golmud Converter Station
- Golmud CPV Solar Park
- Qinghai Golmud Solar Park
