= Xinjiang–Tibet railway =

Railway line in China

The Xinzang railway, Xinjiang–Xizang railway, or Xinjiang–Tibet railway (simplified Chinese: 新藏铁路; traditional Chinese: 新藏鐵路; pinyin: Xīnzàng Tiělù), is a proposed railway that connects Hotan, Xinjiang and Xigazê, Tibet. It is one of three planned railways to Tibet in the Mid-to-Long Term Railway Network Plan (revised in 2008), the other two are Chuanzang railway (Sichuan–Tibet) and Yunnan-Tibet railway (Yunnan–Tibet).

In February 2023, the government of Tibet Autonomous Region announced the first section, Shigatse to Pakhuktso, was to be scheduled to open in 2025. The second section will connect Pakhuktso to Hotan in Xinjiang by 2035. The railway is also planned to connect Nepal and India.

As of October 2025, the line was scheduled to begin construction in the following month.
