= Lhasa 500kV Transmission Project =

Chinese energy infrastructure project

The Lhasa 500kV transmission and substation project (Chinese: 拉萨500千伏输变电工程) begins at the Wokha 500kV substation in Sangri County, Shannan City, and extends to the Lhasa 500kV substation in Lhünzhub County, Lhasa City.

== Background ==
This project is part of the DC Phase II Expansion Project of the Qinghai-Tibet Networking Project (Chinese: 青藏联网工程直流二期扩建工程). The DC Phase II of the Qinghai-Tibet Interconnection Project was approved by National Development and Reform Commission in February 2024, with a total project investment of RMB 2.603 billion.

== Electricity Transmission ==
The route passes through Lhasa and Shannan cities and spans five districts and counties in 2024. The project is divided into seven bidding segments, comprising six line segments and one substation segment. As a key annual supply guarantee initiative of State Grid Tibet Power, the project will address the central Tibet power grid's load demand upon completion. It will also support surplus hydro-power transmission in central Tibet and the electrification of the Qinghai-Tibet Railway, contributing to the sustainable development of Tibet's society and economy.
