= Sichuan-Tibet Networking Project =

Chinese energy infrastructure project

The Sichuan-Tibet Networking Project (Chinese: 川藏联网工程), or Sichuan-Tibet Interconnection Project, formally referred to as the Sichuan-Tibet Interconnection Transmission and Transformation Project, HVDC Sichuan-Tibet, seeks to link the power grid of Chamdo in Tibet with that of Sichuan, thereby terminating the prolonged isolation of the Chamdo region and fundamentally addressing the critical electricity shortage and power deficiency in the southern areas of Chamdo and Garzê in Sichuan. The project spans over 1,500 kilometers, predominantly situated in high mountainous and uninhabited regions, with an average elevation of 3,850 meters and a maximum elevation of 4,980 meters, considered the most arduous power transmission endeavor in the world.

== Geography ==
In the southern region of Garzê Prefecture in Sichuan and the Chamdo area in Tibet, where the average elevation exceeds 3,500 meters, over 700,000 farmers and herdsmen lack reliable access to electricity. The Sichuan-Tibet Interconnection Project links the Tibet-Changdu power grid with the Sichuan power grid, situated on the "Three Rivers Nature Reserve" fault zone where the Jinsha, Nu, and Lancang Rivers converge, recognized as one of the most intricate geological formations and a region with extensive geologic hazards in the world. The project spans over 1,500 kilometers, predominantly traversing high mountains and uninhabited terrain, with an average altitude of 3,850 meters and a maximum altitude of 4,980 meters.

== Project History ==
In August 2013, the State Grid Corporation established the Sichuan-Tibet Interconnection Project Construction Command and stationed it in Batang to comprehensively execute the construction preparatory activities. In January 2014, the National Development and Reform Commission approved the engineering feasibility study program. The project encompasses 1009.2 kilometers of new 500kV transmission line from Xiangcheng to Batang to Chamdo, 512 kilometers of new 220kV transmission line from Chamdo to Yulong and from Chamdo to Batang County, along with the construction of two new 500kV substations in Batang and Chamdo, and two 220kV substations in Bangda and Yulong. The project's overall investment amounts to 6.63 billion yuan.

The Sichuan-Tibet connectivity project commenced on March 18, 2014. This is another significant electricity transmission and transformation initiative that crosses alpine and high-altitude regions following the Qinghai-Tibet Networking Project. On August 4, 2014, the Sichuan-Tibet Networking Project commenced wire erection, successfully across the Jinsha River five times, and on November 20, the commissioning ceremony for the Sichuan-Tibet Power Networking Project took place. Yu Zhengsheng, a member of the Politburo Standing Committee of the Chinese Communist Party and Chairman of the National Committee of the Chinese People's Political Consultative Conference (CPPCC), attended the ceremony in Beijing and declared the project's commencement of operations.

The Sichuan-Tibet Power Interconnection Project terminated the prolonged history of isolated network operation in the Chamdo region of Tibet and fundamentally address the power consumption issues of almost 500,000 residents in the area.

== See also ==
- Qinghai-Tibet Networking Project
- Central Tibet Networking Project
