= Yunnan–Tibet railway =

Planned railway line in China

The Yunnan-Tibet Railway (Chinese 滇藏铁路, Pinyin Diān-Zàng tiělù) is a railway line under construction connecting Kunming, capital of southwest China's Yunnan Province, with Lhasa, capital of Tibet Autonomous Region. It is one of three planned railways to Tibet in the Mid-to-Long Term Railway Network Plan (revised in 2008), the other two are the Chuanzang railway (Sichuan–Tibet) and the Xinjiang–Tibet railway.

Its total length will be 1,594.4 km. It will connect to the Sichuan–Tibet railway in Bomê (pinyin : Bōmì)

== See also ==
- Sichuan–Tibet railway
