= Sichuan–Tibet railway =

High-elevation railway line in China

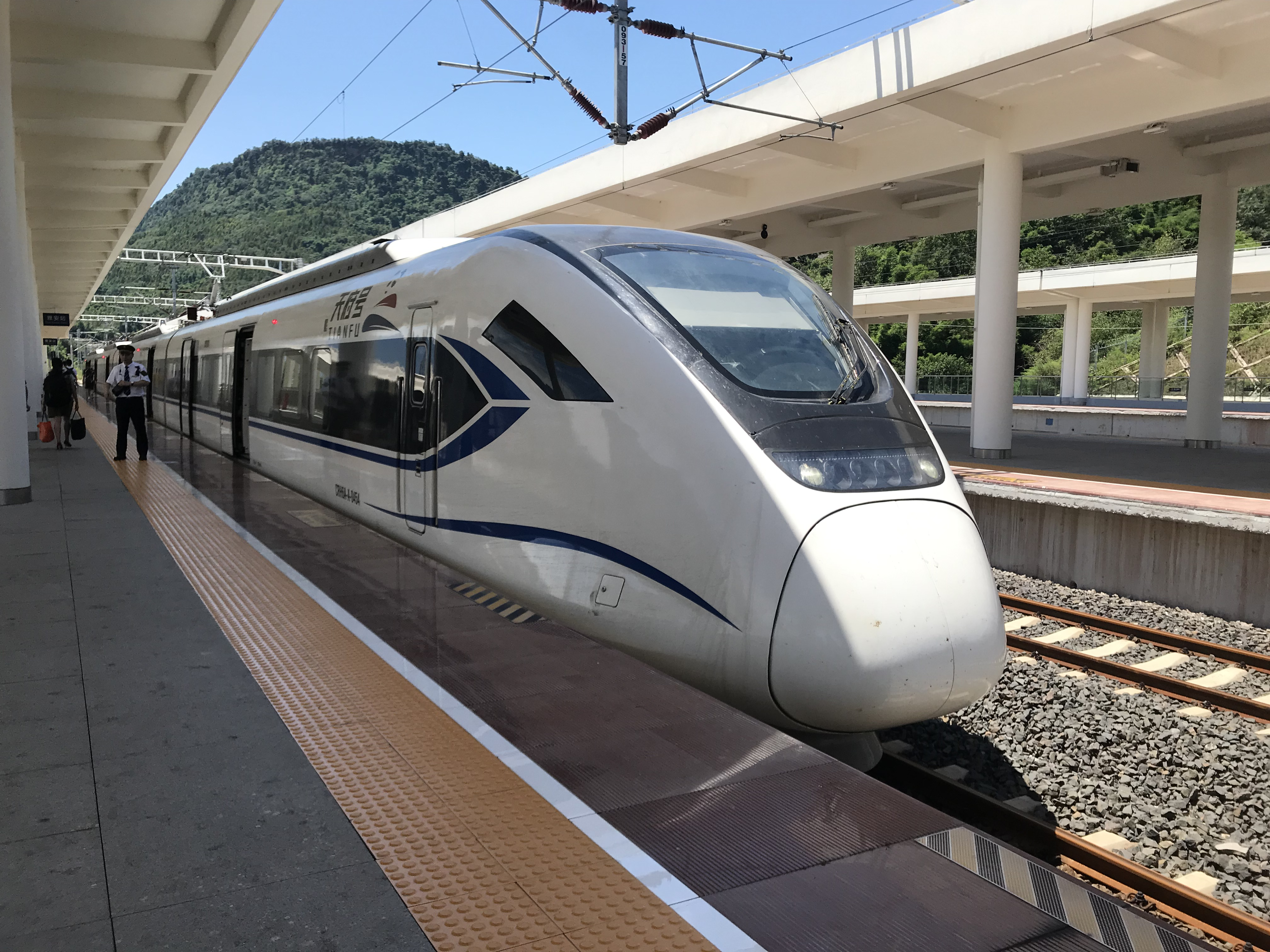
- D6622 at Ya'an Railway Station

Overview
- Status: Under construction (2014-2030)
- Locale: Sichuan; Tibet
- Termini: Chengdu West railway station; Lhasa railway station

Service
- Type: Higher-speed rail

History
- Planned opening: 2030 (expected for full line)
- Opened: 28 December 2018 (Chengdu–Ya'an segment); 25 June 2021 (Nyingchi–Lhasa segment)

Technical
- Line length: 1,629 km (1,012 mi)
- Number of tracks: 2
- Track gauge: 1,435 mm (4 ft 8 1/2 in) standard gauge
- Electrification: Yes
- Operating speed: 160km/h

The Sichuan–Tibet railway, Sichuan–Xizang railway or Chuanzang railway (simplified Chinese: 川藏铁路; traditional Chinese: 川藏鐵路; pinyin: Chuānzàng Tiělù) is a partially opened high-elevation and the National first-class trunk railway in China that will connect Chengdu, the capital of Sichuan province, and Lhasa, the capital of Tibet, when fully completed. The line will be 1,629 km (1,012 mi) long, and significantly cut travel time from Chengdu to Lhasa from 48 to 13 hours.

== History ==
The first segment to enter operation was from Chengdu–Ya'an on 28 December 2018. The second segment to enter operation, from Nyingchi–Lhasa, opened on 25 June 2021. It is the first electrified railway in the Tibet Autonomous Region, and the first higher-speed rail on the plateau. China high-speed railway service runs China Railway CR200J Fuxing series trainset on this line. The final Ya'an–Nyingchi segment is expected to complete in 2030.

== Construction ==
According to Chinese media, the Sichuan–Tibet railway is extremely difficult to construct. The railway has an elevation difference of 3,000 m (9,843 ft). The starting point in the Sichuan basin is at only 300 m (984 ft) altitude above sea level, while the terminus is located 3,000 m (9,843 ft) above sea level on the Tibetan Plateau. 90% of the railway runs at an altitude of more than 3,000 m (9,843 ft).

The Nyingchi segment alone runs through the Yarlung Tsangpo river valley 16 times, and required the construction of 47 tunnels and 121 bridges. One of the most challenging segments was the Milin tunnel with 10 km (6.2 mi) length. Milin tunnel lies down to 1,200 m (3,937 ft) below the top of a mountain range, and has an average altitude of 3,100 m (10,171 ft) asl., due to being situated on the Tibetan Plateau.

A 1,011 km (628 mi) long Ya'an–Nyingchi segment will have 72 tunnels with a total length of 851 km (529 mi) with multiple tunnels with a length of more than 30-kilometre (19 mi), of which the longest tunnel is the 42.5-kilometre-long (26.4 mi) Yigong Tunnel.

The railway is tunneled through areas with high-temperature earth-crust.

The total cost of the entire project is given with around 319.8 billion RMB.

== Segments ==
=== Chengdu–Ya'an segment ===
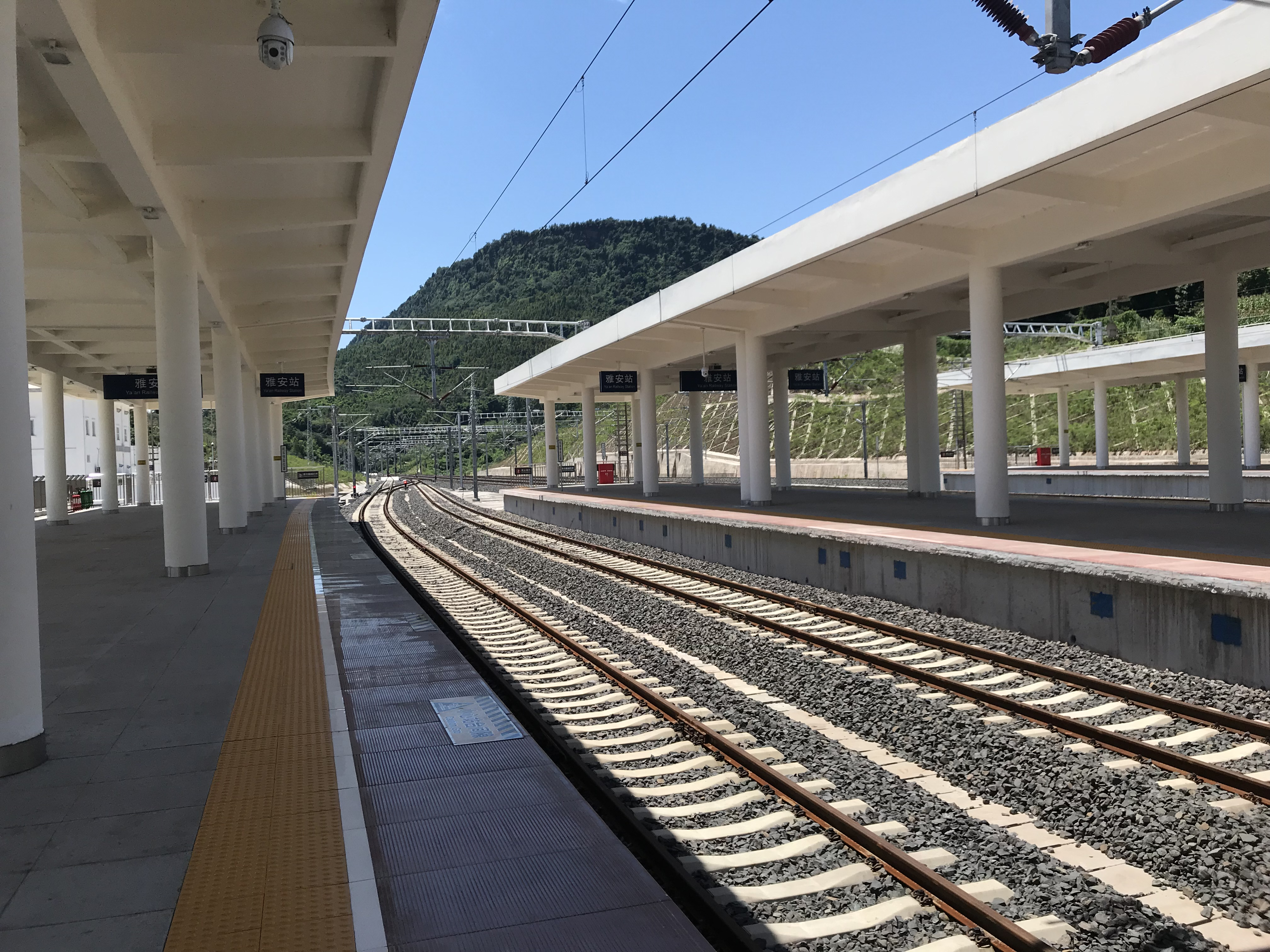
Sichuan-Tibet Railway Extension from Ya'an railway station

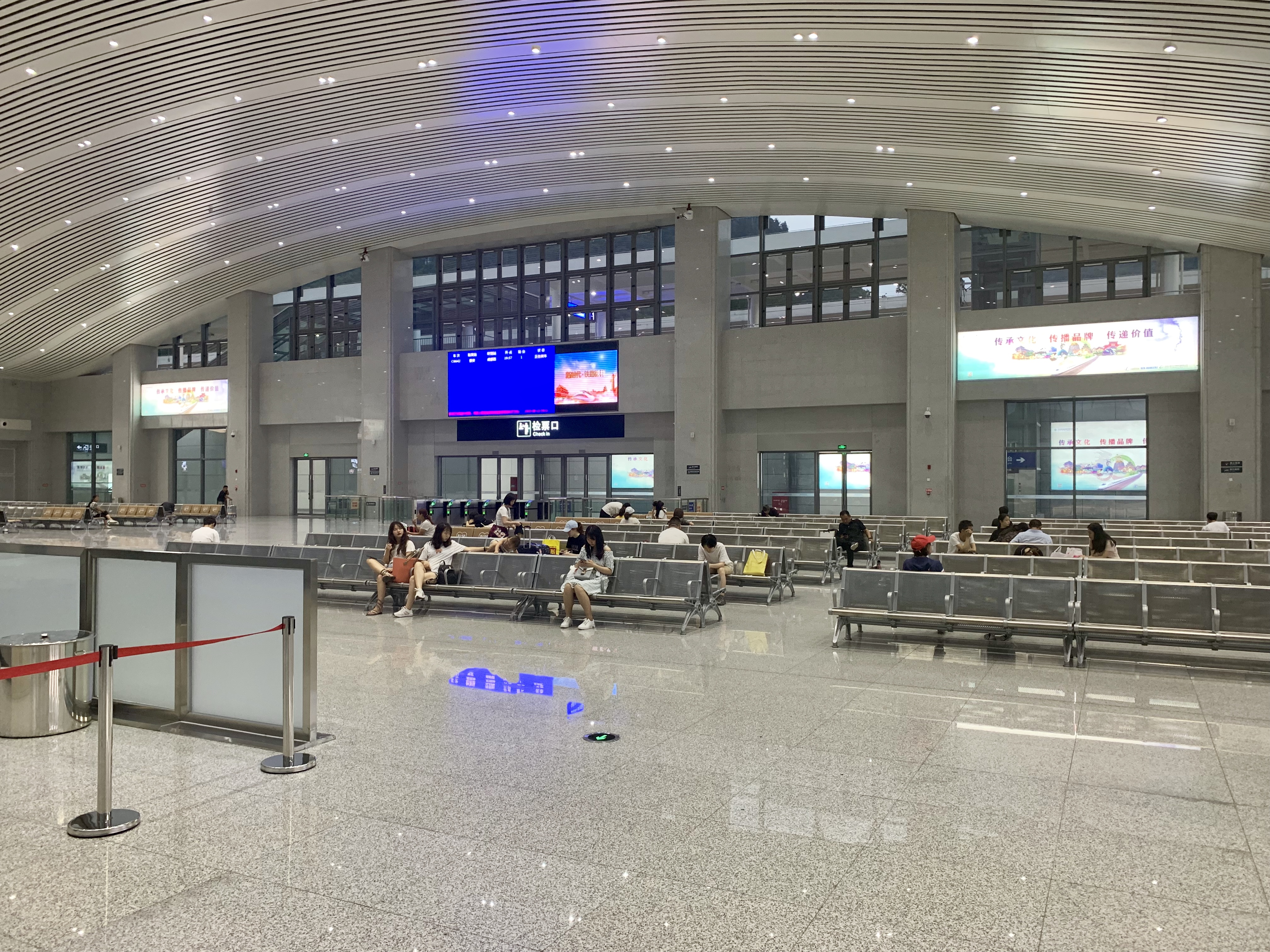
Ya'an railway station waiting lounge

The Chengdu to Ya'an segment is 140 km (87 mi) long and has a design speed of 200 km/h (124 mph). This section opened on 28 December 2018.

=== Ya'an–Nyingchi segment ===
The Ya'an to Nyingchi segment is 1,011 km (628 mi) and has a design speed of 120–200 km/h (75–124 mph). It traverses a seismically active region with difficult terrain and a fragile ecology, and is the most difficult part of the railway to construct. The segment's construction started on 8 November 2020 with construction expected to last until 2030.

=== Nyingchi–Lhasa segment ===
The Nyingchi to Lhasa segment has completed construction and has begun operations. The 435.48-kilometre-long (270.59 mi) segment has a design speed of 160 kilometres per hour (99 mph). Nyingchi segment includes 47 tunnels, 121 bridges and a 525 m (1,722 ft) long Zangmu Railway Bridge.

Construction began on 19 December 2014. Tracklaying completed in December 2020. This section opened on 25 June 2021.

On 25 June 2021, the segment began operations, with the first train leaving Lhasa for Nyingchi at 10.30 am. The railway reduces the travel time from Lhasa to Nyingchi from 5 hours to 3.5 hours and Shannan to Nyingchi from 6 hours to more than 2 hours compared to roads. Aside from passenger service, it is also capable of transporting 10 million tonnes of freight annually.

== Rolling stock ==
160 km/h (99 mph) services use the China Railway CR200J trainsets. The CR200J Plateau variant will serve the railway, a type of bi-mode locomotive specifically designed for plateau operations. 31 sets of train in a 12-car configuration are in service. A combination of diffusion and distributed oxygen systems are installed to help alleviate altitude sickness for passengers on the trip.

== Benefits ==
The railway will greatly reduce travel times and increase connectivity between Lhasa and the eastern cities of the country. Prior to the Sichuan–Tibet railway, one must travel via Golmud and Lanzhou to make this journey by rail. The line is a serious engineering challenge, and serves the purpose of integrating local communities, as well as the interior and coastal regions of China. The railway is also expected to have major positive impact on tourism in the western parts of the country.

== See also ==
- Qinghai–Tibet railway
- Lhasa–Shigatse railway
- Yunnan-Tibet railway
